= Siege of North Gaza =

2024 engagement in the Gaza Strip

- Part of the Israeli invasion of the Gaza Strip, and the insurgency in the North Gaza Strip during the Gaza war
Date	5 October 2024 – 19 January 2025 (3 months and 2 weeks)
Location	North Gaza Governorate, Gaza Strip, Palestine
Result	Ceasefire and Israeli withdrawal

Belligerents
Israel	Hamas Palestinian allies: Palestinian Islamic Jihad Al-Aqsa Martyrs' Brigades Popular Front for the Liberation of Palestine Democratic Front for the Liberation of Palestine Popular Resistance Committees Palestinian Mujahideen Movement

Units involved
Israel Defense Forces; Israeli Ground Forces; Southern Command; 162nd Division; 143rd Division; Central Command; 99th Division; 900th Brigade; Israeli Air Force	(Palestine) Palestinian Joint Operations Room; (Hamas) Al-Qassam Brigades; Al-Quds Brigades; Al-Aqsa Martyrs' Brigades; Abu Ali Mustafa Brigades; National Resistance Brigades; Al-Nasser Salah al-Deen Brigades; Mujahideen Brigades

Strength
(Israel) Unknown	(Hamas) 5,000 fighters

Casualties and losses
Per IDF: (Israel) 18+ soldiers killed or injured Per Hamas: (Israel) 2 Merkava tanks destroyed	Per IDF: (Palestine) 1,300+ fighters killed (Palestine) 1,750+ captured
- 3,700+ people killed or missing 10,000 people injured 20,000+ forcibly displaced

The siege of North Gaza was an engagement of the Gaza war in the North Gaza Governorate, Gaza Strip, between Israel and Hamas-led Palestinian forces. It began on 5 October 2024 when the Israel Defense Forces (IDF) reinvaded Jabalia and its refugee camp for the first time in months since earlier fighting.

The siege was reportedly part of Israel's "generals' plan" to force Palestinians out of northern Gaza by designating it a combat zone and issuing evacuation orders to civilians under threat of death. The IDF imposed a complete siege on northern Gaza, cutting it off from Gaza City by destroying most of the roads leading south and preventing the entry of aid. Evacuations were hindered, however, by Israeli bombardments and shootings of fleeing civilians, leaving many trapped. Human rights groups raised concerns of war crimes, and Israeli actions were characterized as ethnic cleansing and genocide. Israel attacked hospitals and medical infrastructure, as international bodies warned of disastrous conditions in Jabalia.

Israel's siege extended to Beit Lahia and Beit Hanoun, with officials stating no food had been allowed to enter either town or Jabalia. A senior COGAT official stated that aid delivery was being confined to Gaza City because there was "no population" remaining in Beit Lahia and Beit Hanoun.

A ceasefire between Israel and Hamas came into effect on 19 January 2025, with the IDF withdrawing from northern Gaza to a buffer zone along the Gaza Strip–Israel border on that same day.

== Background ==
Fighting between Palestinian militants and the IDF had taken place in Beit Hanoun and Jabalia since 27 October 2023 and 8 November 2023, respectively. The IDF also launched raids into Beit Lahia such as the Kamal Adwan Hospital sieges in December 2024 and May 2024.

The IDF encountered "significant resistance" during the fighting in Jabalia and ultimately failed to dismantle Hamas' presence in the city.

On 31 May 2024, the IDF withdrew from North Gaza, including both Beit Hanoun and Jabalia.

In the four months since the Israeli withdrawal, Hamas reportedly reconstituted itself in Jabalia and managed to recruit thousands of new fighters in the area. Hamas also planted explosives in almost all buildings in Jabalia, sometimes even causing the death of its own militants.

== Siege ==
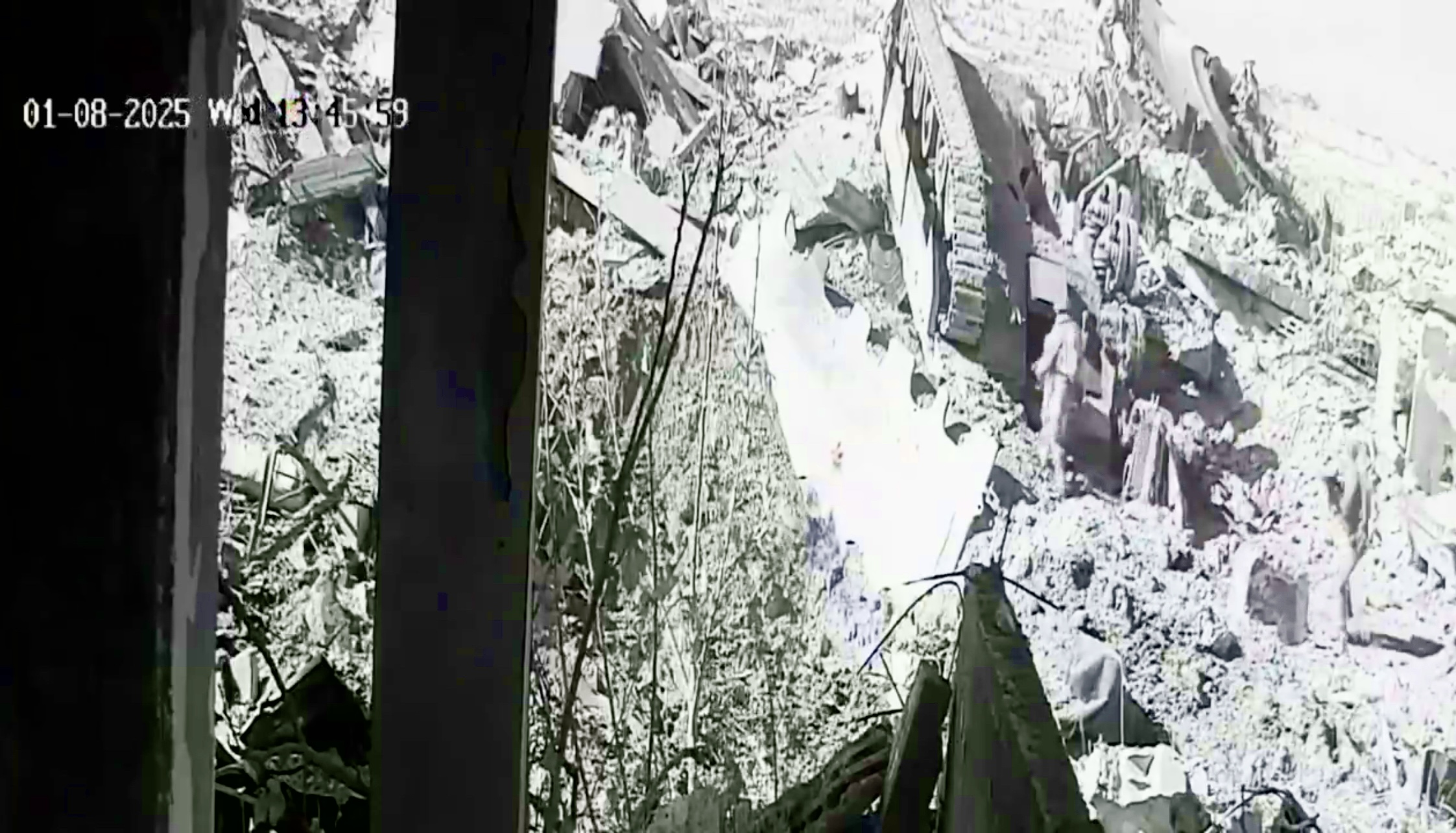
Israeli soldiers inspecting a Merkava that was destroyed by Hamas in Beit Hanoun

=== Jabalia ===
On the evening of 5 October, the IDF began its stated operation to dismantle Hamas control in Jabalia, with the Israeli Air Force launching strikes around the area while armored brigades encircled the Jabalia refugee camp.

The IDF advanced into Jabalia and were met by combined attacks from Hamas, Palestinian Islamic Jihad (PIJ), al-Aqsa Martyrs' Brigades, and the Popular Front for the Liberation of Palestine (PFLP). PIJ launched an attack on an Israeli command and control room belonging to forces attempting to penetrate the Jabalia refugee camp.

On 10 October, Hamas organized an ambush which destroyed an IDF mechanized infantry company of 12 vehicles east of the Jabalia camp. The IDF said that an Israeli airstrike on a Hamas command and control centre killed at least 12 Hamas and PIJ commanders.

On 13 October, Israeli prime minister Benjamin Netanyahu stated that the IDF had reached "the heart of Jabalia" and were dismantling Hamas strongholds there. The IDF also attacked a site from which PIJ had launched rockets at Ashkelon the previous day. On the other hand, Palestinian militant forces continued defensive operations in Jabalia with explosives and rockets.

On 17 October, the Israeli air forced bombed the Abu Hussein school. The IDF stated the shelter was a joint Hamas-PIJ "command and control centre" and that it killed 12 militants. The Gaza Health Ministry stated the school bombing killed at least 28 people, including multiple children, with one health official stating, "Civilians and children are being killed, burned under fire". On 18 October, Israel sent an additional army unit into Jabalia.

On 20 October, Ehsan Daxa, an Israeli army colonel who was the commander of the IDF's 401st Brigade in Jabalia, was killed in combat. He is considered to have been the highest-ranking officer to have died in ground combat since the start of the Gaza war.

On 22 October, Hamas said that its fighters detonated an explosive device targeting 12 Israeli soldiers in the Jabalia refugee camp, killing and wounding some of them.

On 17 November, Israeli media reported that that IDF soldiers preparing an ambush in southern Jabalia were themselves ambushed by Hamas fighters.

On 20 December, a Hamas fighter carried out a suicide bombing against an IDF position in the Jabalia camp.

On 30 December, Palestinian militants carried out a "relatively large attack" in multiple waves against IDF positions around the Jabalia camp.

=== Beit Lahia ===
On 11 October, clashes between the IDF and Hamas were reported to be taking place in Beit Lahia. Palestinian health officials stated on 27 October that Israeli strikes had killed at least 87 people. On 28 October, an Israeli attack on the Beit Lahia residential square reportedly killed 45 people, with more than 30 trapped under the rubble. After residents of Jabalia fled to Beit Lahia, the IDF then reportedly turned their attention to the town. Sam Rose, a UN official, stated, "People who fled to Beit Lahiya have themselves been bombed". Beit Lahia declared a state of emergency due to Israel's siege and attacks, stating, "We declare that the city is a disaster area due to the Israeli war of extermination and siege, and it has no food, water, hospitals, doctors, services, or communications".

Five people were reportedly killed by Israeli airstrikes in Beit Lahia on 1 November. Rescue teams were also attacked, with three members hit by a drone, while the civil defence stated an Israeli tank destroyed their only fire truck. At least twenty people were reportedly killed during an attack on 4 November, with video showing residents pulling bodies out of the rubble.

On 23 December, Hamas said that some of its fighters stormed an IDF position at a building in Beit Lahia and managed to free several Palestinians who had been detained inside.

=== Beit Hanoun ===
In Beit Hanoun, the IDF conducted bombings on the night of 11–12 November and targeted fleeing civilians with drones and sniper fire the next day. The IDF besieged some 130 families in a shelter in the city and forced them to leave at gunpoint.

Despite claiming to have "dismantled Hamas" in Beit Hanoun, Israeli forces who entered the abandoned city on 23 December were immediately ambushed by militants. The IDF acknowledged and incident where a combat vehicle in Beit Hanoun was targeted by anti-tank weapons, eliminating three soldiers.

On 28 December, Israeli forces previously in Rafah were redeployed to begin operating in Beit Hanoun. In another ambush whose details the IDF did not publicise, it acknowledged that three soldiers in Beit Hanoun were wounded and a West Bank settler in the IDF was eliminated.

On 4 January 2025, the IDF destroyed a major Hamas complex in Beit Hanoun.

On 8 January 3 Israel soldiers were killed after their tank hit a booby-trapped pit in Beit Hanoun. An IDF company commander and his deputy were killed in Beit Hanoun after Hamas militants fired an anti-tank missile at their vehicle on 6 January, and a further three Israeli soldiers were killed when Hamas detonated an IED under their vehicle and three more were seriously wounded on the 8th.

On 11 January, an Israeli patrol fell into an ambush in Beit Hanoun. A Merkava was hit by an IED explosion, killing all four of its occupants. The remaining soldiers were then attacked by Hamas militants who opened fire on them before withdrawing, wounding a further six.

== Evacuation and attacks on civilians ==
=== Generals' plan ===
On 6 October 2024, Israel designated all of the northern Gaza Strip as a combat zone and ordered the entire civilian population to evacuate. Both Israeli military analysts and the Al-Mezan Center for Human Rights alleged that this was the first stage of the "generals' plan", a policy proposed by former Israeli general Giora Eiland to force Palestinians out of Gaza on pain of death. The Israeli human rights organizations Gisha, B'Tselem, Physicians for Human Rights and Yesh Din stated there were "alarming signs" that Israel was implementing the plan. Three Israeli reserve soldiers in Gaza stated it was their understanding the general's plan was being practically implemented. The plan has been described by Hamas as genocidal. Others have described the plan as the ethnic cleansing of northern Gaza. The United Nations warned that Israel was not allowing food to enter northern Gaza or Jabalia.

On 7 October, the IDF issued evacuation orders for residents of Jabalia, Beit Hanoun, and Beit Lahia, instructing them to travel southwards to the al-Mawasi humanitarian zone. Following these evacuation orders was made more difficult by Israel's ongoing bombardment, as well as drones pursuing and shooting at individuals attempting to flee. Residents reported being trapped in Jabalia, with all roads blocked except the main highway leading out. However, they also stated quadcopters were firing at anyone attempting to leave, with one resident stating, "It’s like hell. We can’t get out."

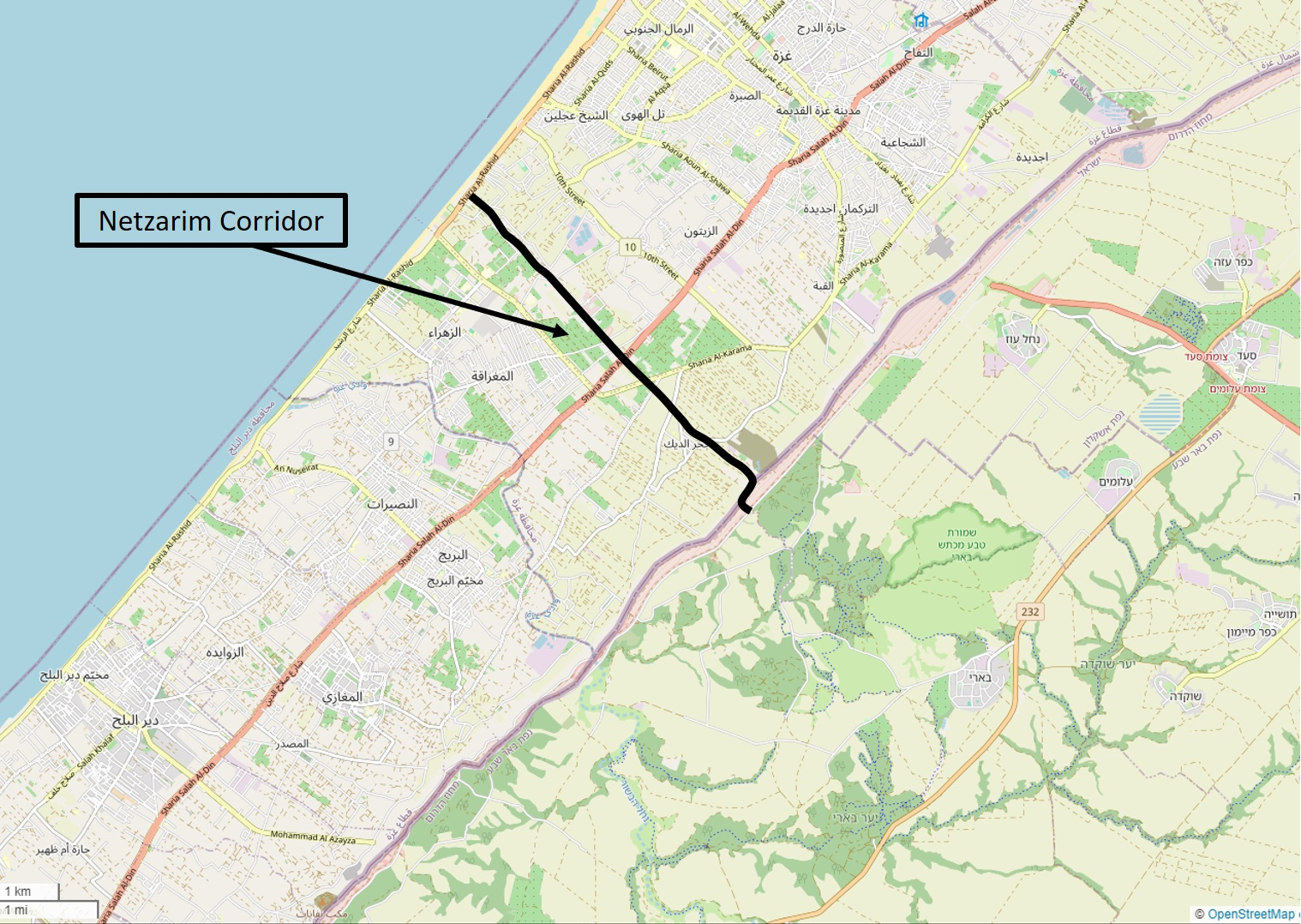
Approximate location of the Netzarim Corridor.

According to Israeli media, tens of thousands of Palestinians have passed through the IDF security crossing at the Netzarim Corridor to get to the southern Gaza Strip. On 7 October 2024, however, UN Spokesperson Stéphane Dujarric stated many people in northern Gaza were "trapped" in their homes and that "few families have crossed Wadi Gaza heading South". Doctors Without Borders stated at least five of their staff members were trapped in Jabalia, stating, "Nobody is allowed to get in or out; anyone who tries is getting shot". UNRWA head Philippe Lazzarini stated, "People attempting to flee are getting killed, their bodies left on the street".

Anas al-Sharif, a journalist on the ground, stated that possibly thousands of families were "trapped between tanks, their gunfire, and heavy artillery shelling". One woman stated she was forced from her home "at gunpoint" as tanks and heavily armed soldiers encircled her family, and that young men were separated for interrogation. Another woman stated that in Jabalia, a quadcopter told residents: "Don't think of north Gaza ever again." Israeli footage showed men separated at checkpoints in northern Gaza and possibly detained. The Israeli military released footage of Palestinians being rounded up near the besieged Indonesia Hospital, where they had been sheltering. Residents stated Israeli forced stormed shelters for displaced families and detained men, with footage showing men sitting next to a tank while others were led away by a soldier. The UN Human Rights Office stated it was concerned the men could be subject to arbitrary detainment and torture.

=== Targeting of civilians ===
Per the Palestinian Civil Defense, at least 17 people, including 9 children, were killed in the IDF's initial wave of airstrikes. One of those killed was journalist Hassan Hamad, who was reportedly deliberately targeted by Israel after receiving threats via messages and calls from Israeli officers, ordering him to stop his reporting. After an Israeli airstrike on 11 October that killed at least 22 Palestinians and wounded more than 90, Hamas made a statement the following day condemning what it described as the "Nazi occupation’s massacres" in Jabalia under United States protection. Journalists stated they were being directly targeted by the Israeli army, including Fadi Al Wahidi, who was reportedly shot in the neck by a sniper.

On 14 October, Al Jazeera Arabic reported the Israeli military was planting explosives in homes to demolish them. The same day, medics reported that Israeli forces fired on civilians waiting for flour at a food distribution centre, killing ten people and wounding dozens. On 16 October, the Gaza Civil Defense stated there were dozens of people trapped under the rubble, and some bodies were laying in the road unable to be rescued. Gaza's civil defence agency spokesman stated, "There are a number of pleas from families being bombed inside Jabalia camp... but it is difficult for our teams to reach the bombed sites". As a result, northern Gaza's head of emergency services stated, stray dogs were eating bodies in the street.

On 18 October, video from the Jabalia camp showed a double tap strike in which a 13-year-old boy was hit by an airstrike, and after a crowd gathered to help him, a second bomb fell, killing the thirteen-year-old and another boy and wounding 20 others. Al Jazeera Arabic reported a home had been demolished while a family was still inside it. Jabalia experienced a communications blackout, which disrupted rescue operations. The blackout was reportedly caused by damage to key infrastructure in Jabalia, including communication towers. Attack drones and ongoing bombings also prevented the civil defense from rescuing residents trapped under rubble. On 19 October 33 people were killed and more wounded by an Israeli airstrike on several houses near the Nassar junction. The entirety of the historic Block 2 area was reportedly destroyed by Israel, including homes and infrastructure. According to one woman, "The Israelis started shelling us with artillery, their drone and warplanes fired missiles, too. Then, they stormed the area with their tanks and opened fire randomly." At least 87 people were killed by an airstrike in Beit Lahia.

On 21 October 10 people were reportedly killed and 30 wounded by an Israeli attack at the Jabalia Preparatory School turned shelter. A paramedic fleeing the shelter stated that people were attempting to comply with an evacuation order when "suddenly there was shelling". On 23 October, civil defence teams stated they were attempting to rescue people buried under rubble by hand. The same day, three civil defense workers were wounded in a "targeted strike" by Israel, leading the agency to suspend operations in northern Gaza. Israeli forces also reportedly killed northern Gaza's chief of police. The civil defense reported 150 people were killed and injured in an airstrike on Jabalia's Block 7 on 24 October. Dozens were killed by Israeli strikes on residences in Beit Lahia on 26 October. As many as 93 people were killed by an Israeli airstrike on Beit Lahia on 29 October.

On 1 November 2024, the Gaza Government Media Office reported two Israeli airstrikes on residential buildings killed 84 people, including 50 children. The civil defense stated they were unable to reach the site and residents were attempting rescues. Women evacuating from Jabalia stated the Israeli army forced them into holes, where dust was thrown on them as an intimidation tactic.

Dr. Mounir al-Bursh, the director-general of the Gaza Health Ministry stated "entire families have disappeared" during Israel's siege and attack on northern Gaza. Residents were quoted as saying they were undergoing a genocide, with one reporter stating, "Families have been getting killed inside their homes in Jabalia."

== Humanitarian impacts ==
The true extent of the siege and attacks on northern Gaza are largely unknown, due to widespread communications blackouts, the lack of emergency services to rescue people buried under rubble, and Israeli attacks on and killing of Palestinian journalists documenting its actions. Gaza's civil defence agency, responsible for first responder and rescue services, stated on 24 October that it could no longer operate in northern Gaza due to threats from the Israeli military. On 1 November 2024, the acting UN humanitarian aid chief Joyce Msuya, the heads of UNICEF, the World Food Programme, and other UN agencies and aid groups warned that the entire population of northern Gaza was "at imminent risk of dying from disease, famine and violence". According to the UN Population Fund, an estimated 4,000 pregnant women remained trapped in northern Gaza.

On 4 November 2024, the head of the Gaza civil defense stated, "Medical teams, civil defence crews and hospitals in the northern region have been out of service for the 13th day in a row." By then, northern Gaza had no functioning ambulances operating in the area.

=== Humanitarian aid and supplies ===
UNRWA chief Philippe Lazzarini stated Israel was preventing medicine and food from entering northern Gaza. According to Farhan Haq, a UN deputy spokesperson, Israel had denied UN requests to deliver humanitarian aid to northern Gaza as many as 28 times between 6 and 20 October. According to UNOCHA, psychotropic medications were depleted in northern Gaza, as humanitarians reported that two water stations in the region had stopped operating, and a delivery of 23,000 litres of fuel had been denied. Oxfam stated that "the areas that are being depopulated right now have received nothing", in terms of humanitarian aid or supplies. An Oxfam official stated people in northern Gaza were starving to death, stating, "There is nothing. You are talking about tens of days that they are not receiving any supplies". Volker Türk, the UN's human rights chief, stated Israel was subjecting "an entire population" to siege and the risk of starvation. The Gaza Health Ministry stated that it had run out of coffins for the dead and had requested civilians to donate household fabrics.

On 1 November, the United States described Israel's allowances of aid into northern Gaza as "insufficient". On 4 November, the U.S. stated Israel had "failed to implement" their recommendations, and that it would "follow the law" if Israel did not comply by its deadline.

=== Hospitals and healthcare ===
During the siege, the Health Ministry stated Israel was "intensifying its targeting of the health system in the northern Gaza Strip". WHO's vaccination campaign to address Gaza's polio epidemic was delayed in northern Gaza due to the escalating violence and intense bombing. On 9 October, an Israeli airstrike killed at least 15 people inside Al-Yemen Al-Saeed Hospital in Jabalia, which has housed displaced families. Israel reportedly used a "double tap" bombing, injuring fifteen people in a family home, then targeted an ambulance arriving to help them, killing a doctor.

The Gaza Health Ministry stated Israel had besieged and was directly targeting the Indonesia Hospital, Kamal Adwan Hospital, and Al-Awda Hospital. More than 350 patients were reportedly trapped in the three hospitals, including pregnant women, people with chronic health conditions, and individuals needing surgeries. The Al Awda hospital stated Israeli strikes on the hospital and an ambulance had wounded several medical staff. In a statement, the director of Al-Awda Hospital stated, "Israeli forces are targeting everything that moves in northern Gaza".

==== Indonesia Hospital ====
The Indonesia Hospital's director stated, "Israeli tanks have completely surrounded the hospital, cut off electricity and shelled the hospital, targeting the second and third floors with artillery". Staff reported heavy gunfire directed at the hospital, with more than 40 patients injured. Two patients at Indonesia Hospital were reported to have died after the hospital lost electricity, as the UN stated the Indonesia Hospital was no longer operational. Indonesia Hospital's chief nurse stated the hospital's water supply had been cut, that operating the electric generator required permission from the IDF, and there was no food available for four consecutive days. On 21 October 2024, medics at Indonesia Hospital stated Israeli forces set a nearby school on fire, which spread to the hospital and shut down its power.

==== Kamal Adwan Hospital ====
On 25 October 2024, Israel launched a raid of Kamal Adwan Hospital. The Palestinian health ministry stated 600 patients, companions, and staff were trapped. The following day, the World Health Organization stated that while the hospital was still under siege, it had regained contact with its employees there, stating that four employees were injured, 44 health workers had been detained, and four ambulances were damaged. The Gaza Ministry of Health stated that Israeli forces had detained all male medical staff. On 27 October, Dr. Khalil Daqran stated only one medical staff remained in the entire hospital, and that Israeli forces had set parts of the hospital on fire, destroyed its entrances, and demolished walls. Before being detained, one doctor stated, "There is death in all types and forms in Kamal Adwan Hospital and North Gaza."

On 28 October, the IDF said that it captured 100 Hamas militants during the raid on Kamal Adwan Hospital. Both local medics and Hamas denied there was any militant presence at the hospital. Later that day, the IDF withdrew from the hospital. Following the raid, the Gaza Ministry of Health stated, "Two children have died in the intensive care unit after the hospital's generators failed and the oxygen station was targeted". The W.H.O. stated they had continued with patient evacuations, as Kamal Adwan's building was damaged, four ambulances were destroyed, and patients needed medical supplies, food, and water. The W.H.O. stated that it delivered medical aid to the hospital after the raid, but that an Israeli strike had destroyed it. Following continued bombing of the hospital on 4 November, the Gaza Ministry of Health stated, "It seems that a decision has been made to execute all the staff who refused to evacuate the hospital".

On 26 December, an Israeli attack killed 50 people in a building adjacent to the hospital that was housing the hospital staff and their families. The next day, 27 December, the Israeli army stormed the hospital, and hospital officials said Israeli troops set parts of the hospital on fire. The Israeli army forced all patients and staff to leave, and videos showed that Israel had stripped the staff to their underwear and forced them to march from the hospital to an unknown destination. The Israeli army also reportedly switched off oxygen supplies. The Israeli army also arrested 240 individuals it identified as Hamas operatives during the operation, reinforcing its position that the hospital served as a critical point for Hamas operations.

== Reactions ==
The United Nations Human Rights Office warned that Israel was "effectively sealing off North Gaza" and may be committing a war crime as it was possibly attempting to forcibly transfer the region's civilian population. Later the Human Rights Office stated that Israel's conduct might be "causing the destruction of the Palestinian population in Gaza’s northernmost governate through death and displacement." UNOCHA stated it was continuing to "sound the alarm" about the "atrocious conditions" families were experiencing in northern Gaza. Joyce Msuya, the UN's acting humanitarian chief, stated, "Appalling news from northern Gaza where Palestinians continue to endure unspeakable horrors under siege by Israeli forces". James Elder, the spokesperson for UNICEF, stated, "We see now what is probably the worst restrictions we've seen on humanitarian aid, ever". In a statement, Oxfam and 37 other humanitarian organizations stated that northern Gaza was being "wiped off the map". UN Secretary-General Antonio Guterres stated, "People suffering under the ongoing Israeli siege in north Gaza are rapidly exhausting all available means for their survival". Volker Türk, the UN's human rights chief, called the attacks on northern Gaza the "darkest moment" of the conflict in Gaza.

Finnish Foreign Minister Elina Valtonen stated the northern Gaza's "entire population" was "in immediate danger of death". Eran Etzion, the former deputy head of the Israeli National Security Council, stated, "I want to say plainly that all [Israeli] soldiers and all officers who are asked to fulfill an order that might be a war crime in the framework of the Generals' Plan must refuse".

In a statement, Doctors Without Borders stand, "We call on the Israeli forces to immediately stop their attacks on hospitals in North Gaza". B'tselem stated that the "magnitude of the crimes" Israel was committing in northern Gaza were "impossible to describe". The International Committee of the Red Cross described the level of suffering in northern Gaza as "unimaginable".

Israel has denied that it is attempting to intentionally remove or displace the population of northern Gaza. Sawsan Zaher, a Palestinian human rights lawyer, stated, "It doesn’t matter if Israel says it is doing this or not, if it calls it by a different name or not. What matters in international law is what is happening on the ground, and we can clearly see Israel is trying to erase the Palestinian presence in north Gaza." In early November 2024, Brigadier General Itzik Cohen stated that humanitarian would only be allowed to enter southern Gaza, and that "there is no intention of allowing the residents of the northern Gaza Strip to return to their homes".

Palestinians in the Gaza Strip stated they believed Israel was attempting to "finish the job" by forcing all residents of northern Gaza to flee.A resident who refused to leave Jabalia stated, "I'm afraid that if we leave, it will be easy for them to evacuate everyone in Gaza. First [they will drive us] from the camp, then the central Gaza Strip, and eventually all of Gaza."

=== Related shooting attack in Israel ===
Amid the fighting in Jabalia, Muhammad Dardouna, a native of the city, carried out a shooting attack at Highway 4 near Ashdod, Israel, on 15 October, killing a police officer and four other Israelis. While he was originally from Jabalia, Dardouna had moved to the West Bank several years ago and snuck into Israel to conduct the attack. Hamas called the shooting a "natural response" to Israeli actions in the Palestinian territories.

== End of the siege ==
On 19 January 2025, a ceasefire between Israel and Hamas came into effect. That same day, the IDF withdrew from the northern Gaza Strip to a buffer zone along the border with Israel, and Palestinians began returning to their homes in the area. In Jabalia, Palestinians were seen returning to what was described as "an apocalyptic landscape".

An analysis from The Jerusalem Post stated that the Israeli goal of forcing out the civilian population of North Gaza had failed.

== See also ==
- Attacks on Jabalia refugee camp (2023–present)
- Insurgency in the North Gaza Strip
- Gaza genocide
