= 19 October 2024 Beit Lahia attacks =

2024 civilian strikes in Northern Gaza Strip

Beit Lahia attacks
- Part of the siege of North Gaza in the Gaza war
- Location within the Gaza Strip
- Location: Beit Lahia, Gaza Strip, Palestine
- Date: 19 October 2024
- Attack type: Airstrikes, artillery
- Deaths: 92+ Palestinians (mostly women and children)
- Injuries: 100+ Palestinians
- Perpetrator: Israel Defense Forces

On 19 October 2024, the Israel Defense Forces (IDF) conducted attacks on Beit Lahia in northern Gaza, killing at least 92 Palestinians and injuring more than 100, with many more missing believed to be trapped under the rubble. Israeli airstrikes and artillery shells struck several buildings in densely packed residential blocks filled with local residents and evacuees, primarily in the western regions of the city.

== Background ==
Beit Lahia is a city in the Gaza Strip, north of Jabalia, towards the western area of the North Gaza Governorate in the State of Palestine. It sits next to Beit Hanoun and close to the border with Israel. In December 2023, the IDF began an offensive in Beit Lahia. Israel launched airstrikes against what they alleged to be Hamas militants. On 12 December, Israel raided the Kamal Adwan Hospital. On 16 December, Israeli bulldozers crushed people sheltering outside the hospital. One reporter described "a terrifying massacre and unspeakable scenes" and stating, "Dozens of displaced, sick and wounded people were buried alive".

In April 2024, Israel withdrew from all territories in the Gaza Strip except for the Netzarim Corridor. The second Israeli invasion of northern Gaza in May 2024 came after Hamas regrouping in some areas there. By June 2024, Gaza's Civil Defence stated the destruction in Beit Lahia: "defie[d] imagination".

Earlier in the month, Israel had issued evacuation orders telling residents of northern Gaza to move south. One survivor described those earlier evacuation orders by stating Israel had "directed people to go to Beit Lahia and bombed them there".

== Attacks ==
On 19 October 2024, the Israeli Defense Forces (IDF) conducted several attacks on the Beit Lahia project area, bombarding the central and eastern regions the most intensely. Due to the immense size and range of the attacks, civilians in Beit Lahia and Jabalia were forced to evacuate without warning, which was significantly hindered due to the exceptionally high population density of the area caused by mass displacement around the Gaza Strip. Eyewitnesses reported that the entire western area of Beit Lahia shook due to the intense bombardments.

A whole residential block in the west of Beit Lahia was targeted and destroyed by numerous Israeli airstrikes, which was densely packed with both locals and evacuees at the time of its destruction. Several buildings collapsed, many of which were filled with civilians who had not had the chance to evacuate or had been taking cover. The numbers increased in the coming hours as many people were trapped under the rubble. Gaza’s Government Media Office reported that several overcrowded residential blocks were targeted and struck, many of which were full of women and children.

Gaza's civil defense spokesperson Mahmoud Bassal reported that the entire targeted residential block had been "leveled to the ground".

== Response ==
Palestinian civil defense forces and paramedics were unable to reach the sites of the massacre due to continuous Israeli artillery strikes and use of surveillance drones to prevent anyone from reaching the disaster zones. Many of the victims were unable to be rescued due to being trapped under large pieces of concrete and other rubble, preventing rescue teams from reaching them. According to a reporter on the ground, half of the people who were killed in the attack were internally displaced persons who had recently been forcefully evacuated from Jabalia and other regions of northern Gaza due to the renewed siege of Jabalia. The majority of victims were reportedly children, the elderly, and women.

Rescue efforts were further hindered by an internet and telecommunications blackout that began the previous day. Hospitals were unable to treat the mass transfer of casualties to their services due to significant shortages in medical supplies and faculty, exacerbated by Israeli blockades and sieges on hospitals in northern Gaza.

== Reactions ==
The Israel Defense Forces (IDF) alleged that casualty numbers from Gaza’s Government Media Office were typically exaggerated, and that the number of deaths reported did not align with Israeli information about the strike, which they claimed was meant to be a precise strike against a Hamas target. The IDF further justified their course of action by calling the targeted area part of an "active war zone".

The Hamas government media office called the attack a "horrifying massacre" that was part of a "war of genocide and ethnic cleansing". Khalil al-Hayya, a member of Hamas' political bureau, urged for the international community to not let the massacre go unnoticed, and urged Islamic and Arab groups to besiege American embassies and Israeli embassies in protest.

Egypt condemned the attack, stating: "There is no moral or military justification for the significant loss of life among Palestinian civilians, particularly women and children". Qatar News Agency, the state-run media agency of Qatar, stated the Israeli army had: "intensified the crimes of ethnic cleansing, and perpetrated grisly massacres that claimed the lives of dozens of civilians".

Tor Wennesland, the United Nations (UN) special co-ordinator for the Middle East peace process, stated:

"Horrifying scenes are unfolding in northern Gaza. The nightmare in Gaza is intensifying. I condemn the continuing attacks on civilians. This war must end, the hostages held by Hamas must be freed, the displacement of Palestinians must cease."

In a statement, the Organisation of Islamic Cooperation (OIC) stated it viewed:

" [...] this atrocity as a continuation of the many massacres, acts of genocide, and ethnic cleansing perpetrated against the Palestinian people in flagrant violation of international values, conventions, United Nations resolutions, and relevant orders issued by the International Court of Justice."

== Analysis ==
Middle East Institute political analyst Hassan Mneimneh stated that the massacre and other associated attacks in Northern Gaza were caused by the "de-facto participation" of the United States through granting Israel its advanced and high-yield weaponry without any non-performative limitations for use against targets hosting civilians. He further stated that the United States was directly complicit with conscious efforts by Israel to ethnically cleanse northern Gaza, and eventually the Gaza Strip as a whole.

== See also ==
- October 2024 Abu Hussein school attack
- October 2024 Rufaida school attack
- Attacks on Jabalia refugee camp (2023–present)
- 29 October 2024 Beit Lahia strike
- Gaza genocide
