= Israeli generals' plan =

Proposed Israeli siege strategy against Gaza

The "Israeli generals' plan" refers to a siege strategy proposed by former Israeli general Giora Eiland during the Gaza war. The plan would evacuate Northern Gaza from its residents, and label all people remaining there as military operatives, thus allowing to block supplies such as food and medication from entering the area.

The plan was considered by the Israeli government, though was not officially adopted. However, there have been signs that Israel has implemented parts of the plan since October 2024, specifically during the siege of North Gaza. The strategy has been criticized for its humanitarian impact, which some allege to be genocidal and ethnic cleansing.

Israel ultimately did not force out all the civilian population of North Gaza, and the implementation of the January 2025 Gaza war ceasefire allowed displaced Gazans to return to that area, though the ceasefire ended soon after.

== Overview ==
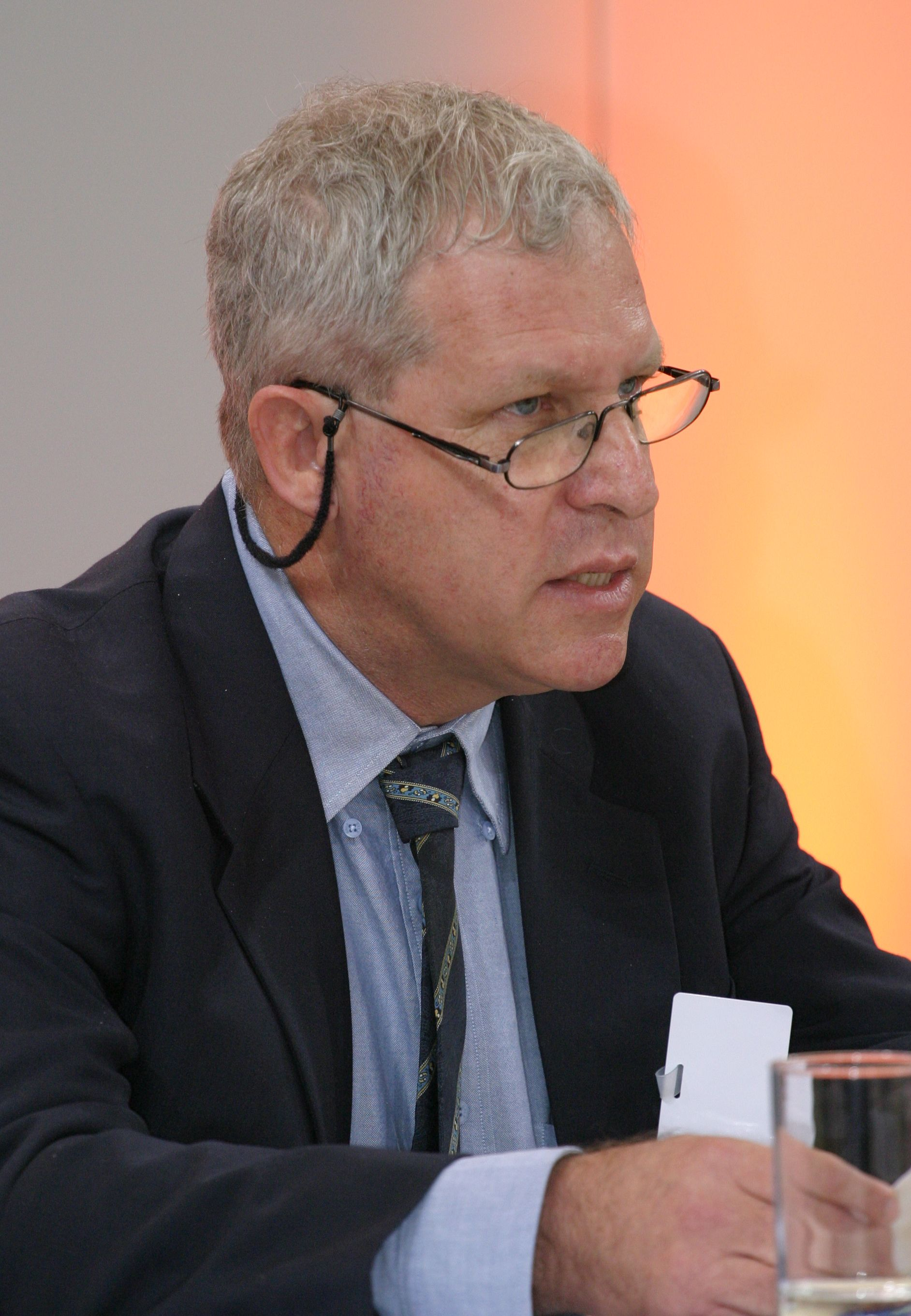
Eiland in 2004

The plan, conceived by retired major general and former head of the National Security Council (NSC), Giora Eiland, and presented to the Knesset by a group of several retired Israeli generals, proposed giving approximately 300,000 Palestinians a one-week evacuation period to depart from the northern third of Gaza before designating it a military exclusion zone (MEZ). Under this strategy, anyone remaining in the area would be considered a combatant. The plan would then implement a complete siege that would block essential supplies until militant surrender, denying all essential supplies including medicine, fuel, food, and water, representing a radical shift in Israeli military strategy for northern Gaza.

According to Giora Eiland, the plan's chief architect, this approach was intended to pressure Hamas and secure the release of approximately 100 remaining Israeli hostages held since October 7, 2023 at the time. The strategy also envisioned Israel maintaining indefinite control over northern Gaza to establish a new Hamas-free administration, effectively dividing the Gaza Strip. Eiland argued that this siege strategy would be both militarily effective and compliant with international law. He specifically emphasized that the plan would target then-Hamas leader Yahya Sinwar's priorities of "land and dignity" by depriving him of both. Eiland stated that Hamas would "either have to surrender or to starve", saying that "it will not be necessary" for the Israeli military to kill everyone in northern Gaza as: "People will not be able to live there. The water will dry up."

The Institute for National Security Studies (INSS) stated that the plan arose from a perceived failure of existing military pressure to secure hostage releases and destroy Hamas's capabilities. Its architects identified a concerning gap between leadership assessments and ground reality, leading them to propose a strategy targeting Hamas's four fundamental resources: money, manpower, supplies, and motivation.

The IDF justified operations in areas like Jabalia as necessary to combat regrouping Hamas operatives. While officially denying implementation of the siege plan, subsequent military operations followed several elements of the proposed strategy.

== History ==
=== Conception and government consideration ===
In April 2024, Giora Eiland presented a comprehensive critique of Israel's military strategy following the October 7 attacks during an interview with The Times of Israel, and proposed several amendments to perceived failures in Israel's exclusive reliance on military pressure against Hamas due to their guerrilla warfare capabilities. Identifying Gaza's dependence on external sources for basic necessities such as fuel, food, and water as key leverage points that could be used more effectively, he proposed strategies that would later develop into the completed generals' plan. These included implications of imposing a harsher blockade on the Gaza Strip and cooperating with the United States Armed Forces to prevent the reconstruction of Gaza while Hamas remained in control.

In late September 2024, Israeli Prime Minister Benjamin Netanyahu unveiled a completed generals' plan to Israeli military and political officials during a closed session at the Knesset Foreign Affairs and Defense Committee. The plan was presented as one of several options under examination for cabinet discussion.

The strategy became a source of tension within the Israeli government, particularly between far-right cabinet members and military leadership. Finance Minister Bezalel Smotrich and National Security Minister Itamar Ben-Gvir supported the plan, viewing it as a means to achieve permanent Israeli control over Gaza. However, Defense Minister Yoav Gallant opposed its implementation. Prime Minister Benjamin Netanyahu's position appeared as ambiguous. While his office officially denied considering the proposal, political analysts suggested he may have allowed partial implementation to maintain support from his far-right coalition partners, particularly during a critical period before budget approval deadlines.

=== Implementation ===
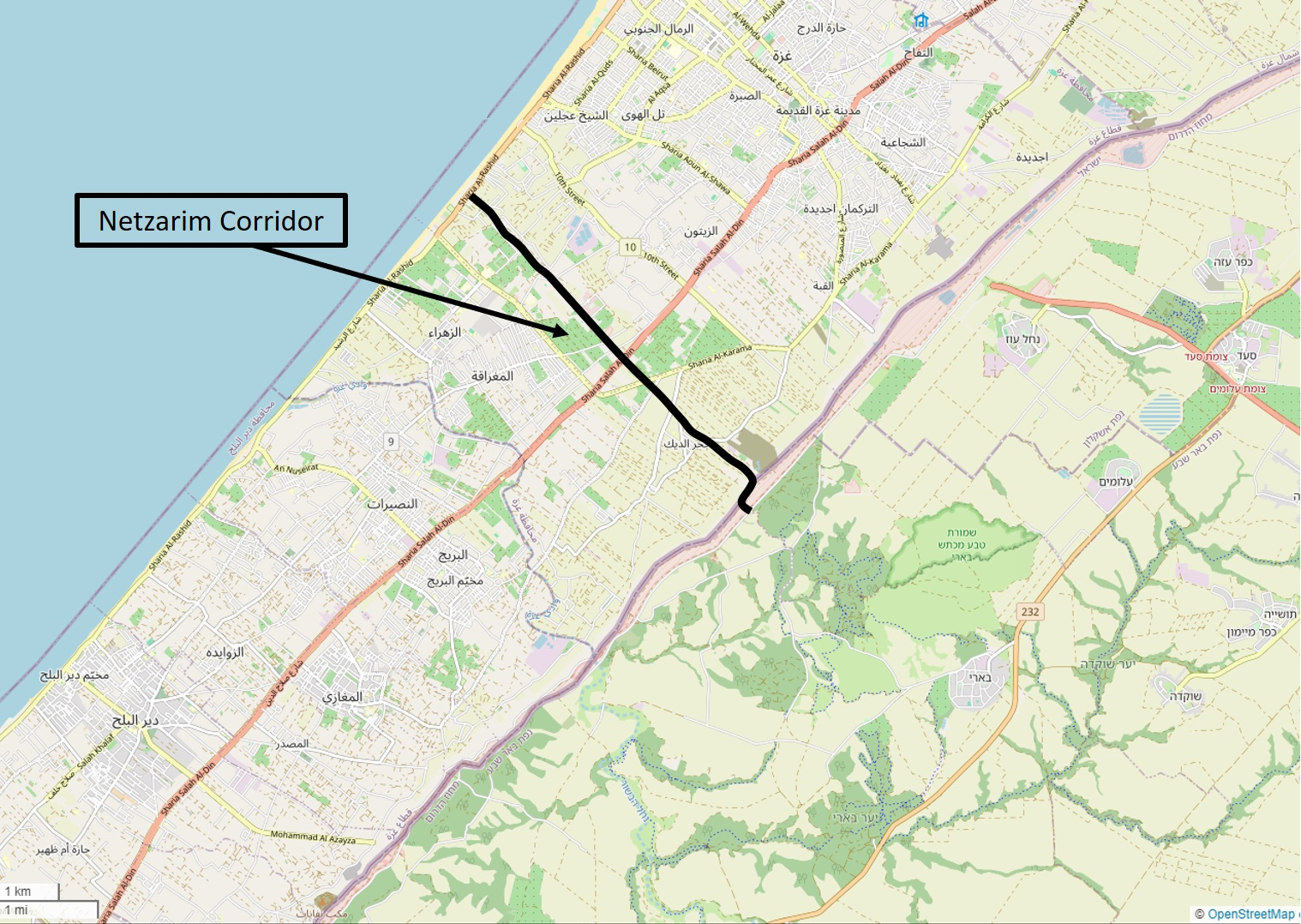
The Netzarim Corridor, which civilians have fled through from Northern Gaza

While the Israeli government stated that they had not officially adopted the full plan, there were indications of its partial implementation in military activities. By early 2024, Israel had already launched military operations in areas such as the Jabalia refugee camp, and the amount of humanitarian aid reaching northern Gaza had significantly decreased since October 1, 2023. Only about eighty aid trucks had entered through northern Gaza crossings during this period, compared to the previous average of sixty trucks per day.

According to CNN, the Israeli military adopted a modified version of the plan in early October 2024. This plan was proposed by the Eiland-led Forum of Reserve Commanders and Fighters, intending to implement the full blockade and mandatory evacuation of the entire civilian population of Northern Gaza, at penalty of death for any residents or refugees who remained in the area.

On 6 October 2024, Israel designated all of the northern Gaza Strip, including Jabalia, as a combat zone and ordered the entire civilian population to evacuate.

On 7 October, the IDF issued evacuation orders for residents of Jabalia, Beit Hanoun, and Beit Lahia, instructing them to travel southwards to the al-Mawasi humanitarian zone. Following these evacuation orders was made more difficult by Israel's ongoing bombardment, as well as drones pursuing and shooting at individuals attempting to flee. Residents reported being trapped in Jabalia, with all roads blocked except the main highway leading out. However, they also stated quadcopters were firing at anyone attempting to leave, with one resident stating: "It’s like hell. We can’t get out".

According to Israeli media, tens of thousands of Palestinians have passed through the IDF security crossing at the Netzarim Corridor to get to the southern Gaza Strip. On 7 October 2024, however, UN Spokesperson Stéphane Dujarric stated many people in northern Gaza was "trapped" in their homes and that "few families have crossed Wadi Gaza heading South". Doctors Without Borders stated at least five of their staff members were trapped in Jabalia, stating: "Nobody is allowed to get in or out; anyone who tries is getting shot".

On 12 October 2024, the Israel Defense Forces (IDF) issued specific evacuation orders through its Arabic spokesman, targeting residents in the "D5" area of northern Gaza. These communications included detailed maps with evacuation routes towards assigned humanitarian zones which designated Salah al-Din Road as the primary evacuation corridor. The communications came with warnings of prolonged military operations with "great force". The evacuation orders affected approximately 400,000 remaining residents in northern Gaza, an area that previously housed 1.4 million people. The evacuation orders and subsequent military actions coincided with the generals' plan in their systematic evacuation orders for specific zones, the creation of one-way movement corridors southward, and implementing restrictions on returning to evacuated areas.

On 5 November 2024, Israel formally announced that it would be systematically removing Palestinians from northern Gaza, with IDF brigadier general Itzik Cohen stating that residents of northern Gaza would not be allowed to return to their homes. He added that humanitarian aid would not be allowed to enter northern Gaza because there were "no more civilians left".

== Humanitarian concerns ==
The proposed strategy raised significant humanitarian concerns among international observers and human rights organizations. Critics argued that the plan would violate international law prohibiting use of food as a weapon as well as forced evacuation and ethnic cleansing as part of the genocide case brought against Israel at the International Court of Justice (ICJ). In line with the plan's outlines, food aid deliveries to northern Gaza ceased after 1 October, with virtually no aid deliveries being recorded during the first two weeks of October 2024. The World Food Programme (WFP) documented the closure of main crossings used for humanitarian aid delivery.

The humanitarian situation in northern Gaza had already deteriorated significantly, with approximately 400,000 people remaining trapped in the area, essential supplies, food, and water becoming increasingly scarce, and movement between different parts of northern Gaza being severely restricted. In addition, few Palestinians heeded evacuation orders, with many fearing they would never be allowed to return.

In addition, several hospitals in northern Gaza reported critical shortages of fuel for generators, exacerbating casualties from ongoing Israeli bombardments. Several essential services, including bakeries and mobile kitchens, were forced to close. Due to restrictions on media access in northern Gaza caused by the plan's implementation, international journalists were largely prevented from entering Gaza.

Human rights organizations strongly criticized the strategy. A coalition of Israeli civil rights groups warned against the plan's quiet implementation, arguing it violated international law. Jessica Montell of HaMoked, a Jerusalem-based civil rights advocacy group, compared the tactics to medieval siege warfare, stating they contradicted fundamental principles of the laws of war.

== Responses ==
Many Palestinian residents in northern Gaza expressed resistance to evacuation orders, choosing to remain despite deteriorating conditions, fearing permanent displacement. The situation particularly affected vulnerable populations, including the elderly, sick, and those unable or unwilling to leave their homes. Many Palestinians expressed fear about moving to southern Gaza, where conditions were already dire with overcrowded tent camps and continued airstrikes on civilian shelters. Other civilians decided against leaving due to needing to care for vulnerable relatives.

The plan has been described by Hamas as genocidal. Others have described the plan as the ethnic cleansing of northern Gaza.

=== In Israel ===
Both Israeli military analysts and the al-Mezan Center for Human Rights alleged that this was the first stage of the "general's plan". The Israeli human rights organizations Gisha, B'Tselem, Physicians for Human Rights (PHR-I), and Yesh Din stated there were "alarming signs" that Israel was implementing the plan. Three Israeli reserve soldiers in Gaza stated it was their understanding the general's plan was being practically implemented. Eran Etzion, former deputy director of the National Security Council (NSC), called the plan "a war crime" and called for Israeli soldiers to disobey orders to implement the plan.

=== Internationally ===
Several United Nations (UN) agencies warned of the deepening humanitarian crisis present in northern Gaza due to imposed humanitarian blockades. the Medical Aid for Palestinians (MAP) organization reported strong concerns about civilian casualties in the area, while aid organizations documented difficulties in delivering essential supplies.

Tamer Qarmout, a professor of public policy at the Doha Institute, stated in response to the implementation of tactics from the plan during the siege of Jabalia:

"We’re talking about another wave of displacement – another Nakba. The future of Gaza is horrifying. I still worry about what’s coming next. The demographic re-engineering of the Gaza Strip is in progress now."

In October 2024, U.S. Secretary of State Antony Blinken and U.S. Secretary of Defense Lloyd Austin sent a letter addressed to Israeli Defence Minister Yoav Gallant and the Israeli Minister for Strategic Affairs Ron Dermer, which established a 30-day deadline for Israel to comply with U.S. requirements regarding humanitarian aid access to Gaza. This ultimatum included potential consequences, including the possibility of suspending U.S. weapons transfers to Israel if demands were not met.

== Analysis ==
=== Effectiveness ===
The Israeli Institute for National Security Studies (INSS) expressed the belief that the plan was based on assumptions with significant flaws. The plan's proponents drew questionable conclusions about the effectiveness of siege tactics in securing hostage releases, overlooking that previous releases were largely attributed to Arab public pressure rather than military coercion. Moreover, the strategy potentially endangered remaining hostages and failed to address Hamas's demonstrated ability to adapt and rebuild its capabilities. The institute also cited legal and humanitarian concerns, such as likelihood of incomplete civilian evacuation, questions of proportionality under international law, and risks of damaging Israel's international standing all presented significant obstacles, compounded by practical difficulties of preventing Hamas fighters from infiltrating humanitarian shelters or disguising themselves among evacuating civilians.

=== United States involvement ===
Doha Institute for Graduate Studies professor Mohamad Elmasry expressed the notion that the letter sent by the U.S. government generally represented a "distraction" in attempt to conceal the administration's complicity in war crimes committed by Israel in Gaza. noted that the diplomatic intervention's timing coincided with the approaching 2024 U.S. presidential election, where Arab and Muslim American voters in swing states could play a crucial role in its outcome.

He also noted that the letter could serve as documentation of U.S. efforts to ensure legal compliance with international law and the U.S. Leahy Law, which governs military assistance to foreign nations, and that the letter's focus on humanitarian aid access potentially served to address immediate concerns while avoiding more contentious aspects of the conflict, such as United States weapons delivery to Israel, forced evacuations, and civilian casualties. He noted that previous U.S. recommendations were often disregarded by Israel, and that the United States had maintained significant military and diplomatic support for Israel despite broad international concerns since Gallant's October 2023 announcement of a "complete siege" on Gaza.

== See also ==
- October 2024 Beit Lahia attacks
- Human rights violations against Palestinians by Israel
- Israeli war crimes in the Gaza war
- Gaza genocide
