= 29 October 2024 Beit Lahia airstrike =

Airstrike on building in northern Gaza

- Part of the siege of North Gaza during the Gaza war
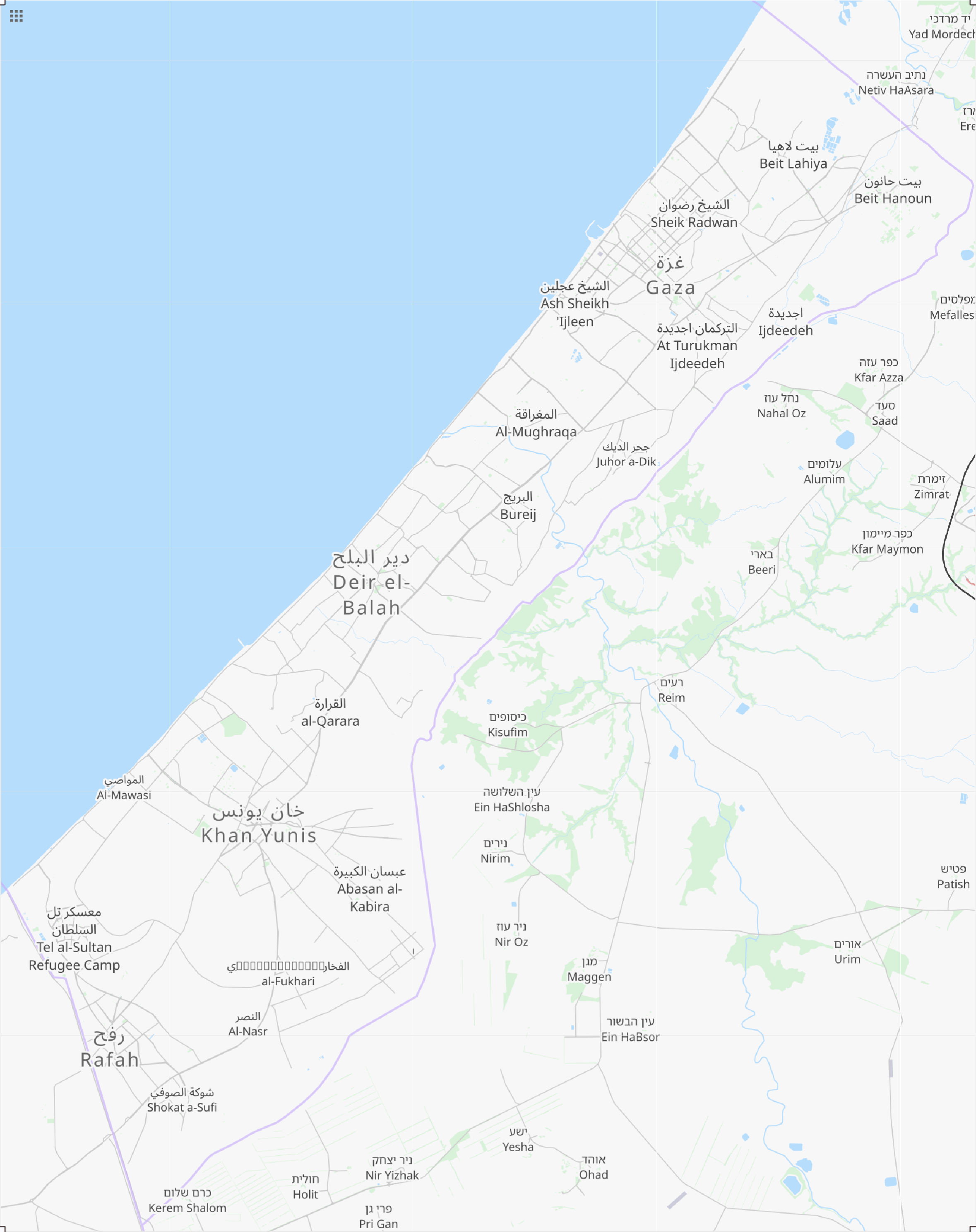
- Location within the Gaza Strip
- Location: Beit Lahia, Gaza Strip, Palestine
- Date: 29 October 2024; 2 years ago 6:30 a.m. (PSST)
- Attack type: Airstrike
- Deaths: 55–93+
- Injuries: Dozens
- Perpetrator: Israel Defense Forces

On 29 October 2024, the Israel Defense Forces (IDF) conducted an airstrike on a five-story residential building in Beit Lahia in northern Gaza, killing at least 55 to 93 Palestinians, including 25 children, and leaving 40 others missing.

== Background ==
The IDF, which had been conducting operations in northern Gaza, said that its attacks were aimed at preventing Hamas forces from regrouping. The IDF also accused Hamas of placing themselves among the civilian population, which Hamas denied.

== Attack ==
The airstrike occurred at 6:30 a.m. local time. The building was being used to shelter displaced Palestinians. Ismail al-Thawabta, the director-general of Gaza's government Media Office, said that 200 people were inside the building when the attack occurred.

The airstrike caused the building to collapse. According to the Gaza Health Ministry (GHM), at least 93 people were confirmed killed in the strike, including 25 children, and dozens of others were injured. They also stated that more than half of those killed in the attack were women and children. The Palestinian Civil Defence (PCD) said that at least 55 people were killed. Forty other people were reported missing.

An IDF official said the strike was conducted after Israeli soldiers noticed a "spotter" on the building's roof. The official added that the strike had not been planned and that Israeli soldiers were not aware that the building was being used to shelter displaced persons.

== Aftermath ==
The Kamal Adwan Hospital, which was besieged by Israeli forces at the time of the airstrike, could not treat the wounded due to a lack of doctors.

== Reactions ==
=== Domestic ===
Gaza's Media Office condemned the strike, referring to it as a "horrific massacre against civilians, children and women", and demanded that medical teams be sent to northern Gaza.

After the attack, the Municipality of Beit Lahia announced that the town had been declared a "disaster area", saying:

"[W]e declare that the city is a disaster area due to the Israeli war of extermination and siege, and it has no food, water, hospitals, doctors, services, or communications".

=== International ===
The United States called the bombing a "horrifying incident with a horrifying result". The French Foreign Ministry condemned the attack. The Office of the United Nations High Commissioner for Human Rights (OHCHR) said it was "appalled" by the airstrike and emphasized that "civilians are protected under international humanitarian law".

== See also ==
- Timeline of the Israeli–Palestinian conflict in 2024
- October 2024 Beit Lahia attacks
- Israeli bombing of the Gaza Strip
- Israeli war crimes in the Gaza war
- Gaza genocide
