= Battle of Jabalia =

2023-24 military engagement in the Gaza Strip

- Part of the Israeli invasion of the Gaza Strip and the insurgency in the North Gaza Strip during the Gaza war
Date	8 November 2023 – 31 May 2024 (6 months, 3 weeks and 2 days)
Location	Jabalia and Jabalia refugee camp, Gaza Strip
Result	Israeli withdrawal: Palestinian militants retain control of Jabalia; 70% of Jabalia refugee camp destroyed

Belligerents
Israel	Palestinian Joint Operations Room; Hamas; Palestinian Islamic Jihad; (Fatah) Al-Aqsa Martyrs' Brigades; Democratic Front for the Liberation of Palestine

Units involved
Israel Defense Forces; Israeli Ground Forces; 98th Division	(Palestine) Palestinian Joint Operations Room; (Hamas) Al-Qassam Brigades; Jabalia al Balad Battalion; Radwan Battalion; Unknown third battalion; (Palestinian Islamic Jihad) Al-Quds Brigades; (Fatah) Al-Aqsa Martyrs' Brigades; National Resistance Brigades

Casualties and losses
- Over 120 bodies recovered

The battle of Jabalia was a battle fought between Israel and Hamas-led Palestinian forces in Jabalia in the Gaza Strip, as part of the ongoing Gaza war.

It began on 8 November 2023 as part of the 2023 Israeli invasion of the Gaza Strip, and ended its first phase in late January 2024 with an Israeli withdrawal. Following this, the two sides intermittently clashed in Jabalia, and then a three-week Israeli offensive in May 2024 ended with a final Israeli withdrawal and Hamas continuing to retain control.

== Battle ==
=== 2023 ===
An Israel Defense Forces (IDF) combat team engaged in 10 hours of fighting in western Jabalia on 8 November, during which it seized weapons and exposed tunnel shafts. The al Quds Brigades launched mortars at Israeli forces operating in the area. On 18 November, IDF spokesperson Rear Admiral Daniel Hagari said that Israeli forces had expanded clearing operations to additional neighborhoods in Gaza City, as the IDF 162nd Division began operating on the outskirts of Jabalia. An IDF spokesperson claimed that Hamas’ northern brigade maintained a command and control center and critical strongholds in Jabalia. The next day, the IDF Nahal Brigade moved from the Al-Shati refugee camp toward Jabalia City to support offensive operations in the area. Israel said its forces encircled Jabalia on the night of November 20–21 as fighters conducted attacks on the Israeli lines of advance. The IDF reported that the Israeli Air Force and artillery forces bombarded the Jabalia area north of Gaza city to “prepare” the battlefield. The IDF told also residents to evacuate from Jabalia.

On 5 December, the commander of the IDF Southern Command said that the IDF was operating in the “core” of Jabalia The IDF stated on 6 December that its Nahal Brigade was fighting militants in Jabalia. On 7 December, the IDF 460th Brigade raided an outpost for Hamas’ Central Jabalia Battalion in the al Bisan area of Jabalia. In addition Israeli forces killed several militants and located a network of underground tunnels, a training complex, and a weapons warehouse near the Hamas battalion's post. On 9 December Israeli forces raided a series of buildings in Jabalia containing Hamas militants and weapons and advanced to the al Sheikh Radwan Pool southwest of Jabalia city. Additionally, Israeli forces called in a drone strike to support their maneuvers in the city.Israeli Defense Minister Yoav Gallant stated on 11 December that Hamas’ Jabalia Battalion was “on the verge of being dismantled.” Israeli forces captured Hamas military infrastructure in Jabalia, including explosives manufacturing facilities, training facilities, and weapons caches. IDF Brigadier General Itzik Cohen said on 19 December that the fighting in Jabalia "resulted in the dismantling of the military capacity” of Hamas’ North Gaza Brigade.

=== 2024 ===
Despite IDF reports that Hamas had been dismantled in Jabalia, the group and other Palestinian forces reinfiltrated the city and launched renewed attacks on IDF troops in the city throughout January 2024. By 30 January, it was reported that the IDF had withdrawn from the area and Hamas had reestablished control.

From February to April 2024, Palestinian forces clashed with the IDF intermittently in Jabalia, especially in the city's eastern areas. On 16 April, the IDF conducted an "unspecified military operation" in Jabalia, which came under artillery fire by Palestinian militants.

By 11 May, the IDF reported that Hamas was "reconstituting militarily" in Jabalia and issued evacuation orders to Palestinian civilians in the area. The IDF launched a full-scale reinvasion of Jabalia on 13 May which lasted three weeks and ended in an Israeli withdrawal on 31 May, with Hamas remaining "combat effective" in the city.

== Aftermath ==
Palestinian officials said that 70% of the Jabalia refugee camp had been destroyed. The IDF said that it had destroyed over 10 kilometers of underground tunnels that it says were used by Palestinian militants. The IDF also said that it had destroyed a number of weapons production sites and rocket launchers.

IDF troops recovered the bodies of seven Israeli hostages in Jabalia during the fighting.

After four months, the IDF reinvaded Jabalia on 5 October 2024.

== See also ==
- Second battle of Jabalia
- Attacks on Jabalia refugee camp (2023–present)
- List of military engagements during the Gaza war
