= Hussam Abu Safiya =

Palestinian doctor

- حسام أبو صفية
- Born: 21 November 1973 (age 52); Jabalia refugee camp, North Gaza Governorate, Palestine
- Education: Ahmet Yassawi University
- Known for: Being detained without charge in Ofer Prison, torture victim
- Title: Director of Kamal Adwan Hospital

Hussam Idris Abu Safiya (Arabic: حسام إدريس أبو صفية, romanized: Ḥusām Idrīs Abū Ṣafīyah; born 21 November 1973) is a Palestinian paediatrician and neonatologist who served as the director of Kamal Adwan Hospital in the Gaza Strip from February 2024 until December 2024, when healthcare workers and patients were removed by the Israeli military during the Kamal Adwan Hospital sieges. Abu Safiya was subsequently arrested by Israel and has been detained without charge in Ofer Prison for over a year. Abu Safiya's health has declined significantly while detained, with his lawyer and human rights groups alleging repeated abuses, and as of 6 July 2026, he is in critical condition.

== Early life and career ==
Abu Safiya was born into a prominent family living in the Jabalia refugee camp in the North Gaza Governorate. His family originally came from the Palestinian town of Hamama, but had been displaced after it was depopulated during the 1948 Arab-Israeli War. After completing his mandatory education, Abu Safiya moved to Kazakhstan. He studied medicine at Ahmet Yassawi University in Turkistan, Kazakhstan. While there, he met and married a Kazakh woman, Elbina. After graduating from university, Abu Safiya and his wife returned to Gaza in 1996, settling in Jabalia.

Abu Safiya went on to specialise in paediatrics and neonatology, obtaining a master's degree and passing the Palestinian Board exams. He began working as a doctor for the Gaza Health Ministry, going on to become the head of the paediatric department at Kamal Adwan Hospital in Beit Lahia, a major hospital serving northern Gaza. In February 2024, Abu Safiya became the director of the hospital, replacing Ahmed al-Kahlout.

In addition to his work at Kamal Adwan Hospital, Abu Safiya also acted as the Chicago-based non-profit MedGlobal's lead physician for Gaza, and worked on developing nutritional stabilization centers at other institutions in the Strip.

== Gaza war and hospital sieges ==
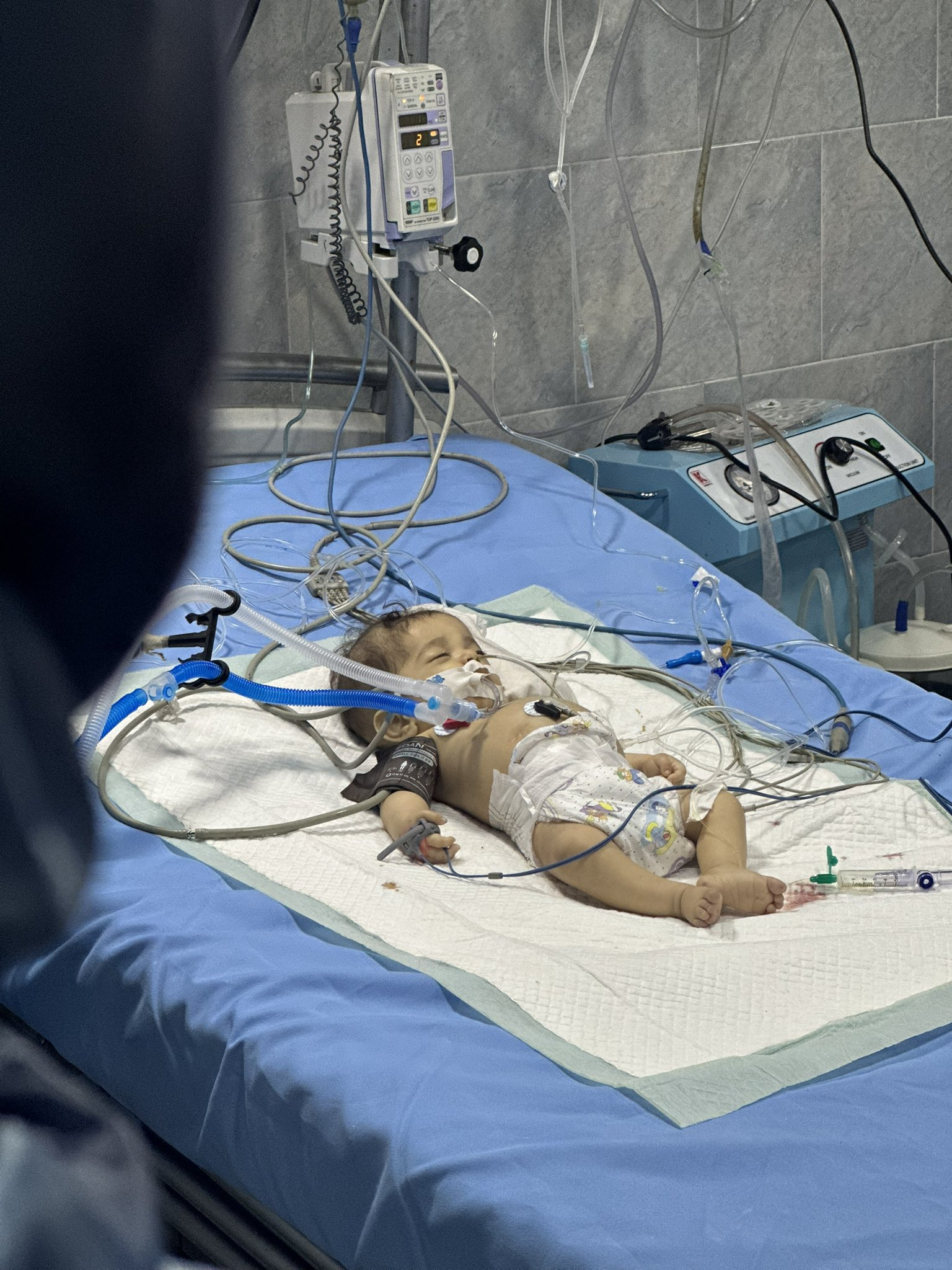
A dead infant during the siege of the hospital while Abu Safiya worked at it in June 2024

Following the outbreak of the Gaza war in October 2023, Kamal Adwan Hospital began to experience multiple sieges by the Israel Defence Forces, beginning in December 2023. Due to frequent bombardments, Abu Safiya and his family moved into the hospital on a permanent basis. Despite a shortage of supplies and power, Abu Safiya was able to increase the hospital's capacity from 120 to 200 beds during the war. The IDF accused Kamal Adwan of sheltering members of Hamas, and Abu Safiya was interrogated by Israeli soldiers on at least four occasions.

Kamal Adwan Hospital became subject to sieges by the IDF in December 2023 and May 2024. In October 2024, the hospital came under almost constant bombardment that lasted until December 2024. On 25 October, Abu Safiya was briefly arrested and detained before being released; on that same day, his 15-year-old son Ibrahim was killed in a drone strike on the hospital's entrance. Aerial footage was subsequently released of Abu Safiya performing funeral rites for Ibrahim in the hospital's courtyard, and he was buried near a wall therein. Between November 2024 and his arrest the following month, Abu Safiya began documenting daily life at the hospital on Instagram.

On 23 November 2024, Abu Safiya was injured by a drone strike on the hospital while walking into his office after completing surgery. He sustained six shrapnel wounds to his leg.

Abu Safiya and his family declined offers from Israeli forces to leave Kamal Adwan Hospital prior to its evacuation. Abu Safiya said that after during one of this interrogations by Israeli forces he assured them, "there were only patients inside the hospital," and with the severe shortage of doctors he could not abandon the patients. Kamal Adwan was one of the last still functioning hospitals in the north of the Gaza Strip before Abu Safiya's abduction by Israeli forces and its forcible evacuation.

== Hospital evacuation and arrest ==
In December 2024, Abu Safiya was interviewed on multiple international news outlets; on 23 December, he told NBC News that Israeli sniper fire and tank shells had damaged Kamal Adwan Hospital's nursery and maternity ward, among others.

On 27 December, the IDF carried out a forced evacuation of the hospital's staff and patients. Footage was released of Abu Safiya leaving the hospital and approaching an Israeli tank, where he shook hands with a soldier and stated that there was no one left in the hospital before entering the tank. The Gaza Health Ministry reported that Abu Safiya had been taken to a detention centre to be interrogated. The IDF reported that 240 people had been detained following the hospital's evacuation, describing it as being a "Hamas terrorist stronghold". Dr. John Kahler, co-founder of MedGlobal, called Abu Safiya "a friend of mine, a hero, mentor," and said he had never seen any evidence of Hamas links to him or the hospital. Women at the hospital, including Abu Safiya's wife, were forced to evacuate to the Indonesia Hospital, and Kamal Adwan was subsequently reported to be out of service.

On 2 January 2025, Physicians for Human Rights–Israel submitted a request on behalf of Abu Safiya's family requesting information on his whereabouts. After initially stating that it had "no indication" of Abu Safiya being either arrested or detained, on 3 January the IDF confirmed that he was being investigated on suspicion of "holding a rank" within Hamas, without providing evidence for the allegation. Detainees who had worked with Abu Safiya at Kamal Adwan Hospital denied that he had been a member of Hamas. While Abu Safiya's location was not shared, Front Line Defenders and the Euro-Mediterranean Human Rights Monitor both reported that testimonies from multiple Palestinian detainees suggested that after initially being interrogated and beaten at a site in Al-Fakhura in Jabalia, Abu Safiya had been taken to the Sde Teiman detention camp in the Negev, and that his health had declined significantly since being detained.

On 9 January 2025, Abu Safiya attended a court hearing at Ashkelon Magistrates' Court, where his detention was extended to 13 February. The Al Mezan Center for Human Rights reported that he had been prohibited from accessing a lawyer until 22 January and that he and his family had not been informed that he would be attending a hearing in Ashkelon.

On 11 February 2025, Abu Safiya was allowed to meet his lawyer in Ofer Prison, located in the occupied West Bank. During their meeting, he reported being subjected to various forms of torture and abuse, including being forcibly stripped, tightly shackled, and forced to sit on sharp gravel for hours. He also endured violent physical assaults, such as beatings with batons and electric shock sticks. Abu Safiya described being held in solitary confinement for 25 days, during which he was subjected to nearly constant interrogation for 10 days. Despite multiple requests for medical care, Israeli authorities denied him treatment for his heart condition.

Abu Safiya's lawyer visited him again on 19 March 2025 in Ofer Prison. She expressed concern about his health stating "He is suffering from arterial tension, cardiac arrhythmia and vision problems," and that "he has lost 20 kilos in two months and fractured four ribs during interrogations, without receiving proper medical care". She stated that Abu Safiya is being tortured to get him to confess to operating on Hamas members, an accusation that he denies.

On 13 July 2025, Abu Safiya's lawyer reported that he had lost over 40 kg (88 lb) while imprisoned and had sustained multiple injuries from a beating on 24 June. The lawyer also said he is being kept in solitary confinement and is being denied medical care for an irregular heartbeat.

Israeli courts twice extended Abu Safiya's administrative detention for an additional six months; in October 2025 and April 2026. On 5 July 2026, Abu Safiya's attorney warned that he was in critical condition following abuses during his incarceration. The attorney and Abu Safiya's son said that he was having trouble breathing and speaking, had fresh injuries, and believed he was going to be killed. His family also told to the Middle East Eye that due to Abu Safiya's condition continued to deteriorate, his family felt that they have been "betrayed" by human rights groups.

== International response to Abu Safiya's imprisonment ==
The World Health Organization (WHO) reported that it had lost contact with Abu Safiya following the evacuation of Kamal Adwan Hospital. Numerous individuals and organisations, including WHO's Tedros Adhanom Ghebreyesus, Amnesty International's Agnès Callamard, the Council on America-Islamic Relations, and the American Academy of Pediatrics called for Abu Safiya's whereabouts to be shared and for his immediate release from detention.

In April 2025, the International Centre of Justice for Palestinians, Hind Rajab Foundation, and Global Legal Action Network wrote to the UK attorney general to apply for an arrest warrant for Israeli Foreign Minister Gideon Sa'ar for the attack on Kamal Adwan hospital and the detention of Abu Safiya.

In June 2025, several organizations, including Human Rights Watch and MedGlobal, published a joint letter calling for the release of health care workers from Gaza and the West Bank detained by Israel, including Abu Safiya and five other MedGlobal staff.

In March 2026, United Nations experts Tlaleng Mofokeng and Ben Saul, serving as Special Rapporteurs, called for Abu Safiya's immediate release. They described his detention as "flagrantly arbitrary" and a violation of the Mandela Rules regarding prisoner access to health care. The experts stated they had received reports that Abu Safiya had been subjected to "severe torture" and "cruel and degrading treatment" while in Israeli custody.

On 8 August 2026, Dr. Muneer Al-Boursh, director general of the Gaza Health Ministry, called on X for urgent action to "save" Abu Safiya, due to his critical condition, before it is "too late".

== See also ==
- Adnan al-Bursh
- Attacks on health facilities during the Gaza war
- Medical neutrality
- Palestinians in Israeli custody
- Mass detentions in the Gaza War
