= International Centre of Justice for Palestinians =

- Types: nonprofit organization
- Coordinates: 51°34′53″N 0°20′20″W
- Website: www.icjpalestine.com

International Centre of Justice for Palestinians or ICJP is a group of lawyers, academics and politicians that makes public statements and organises legal actions in relation to the human rights of Palestinians.

== Aims ==
International Centre of Justice for Palestinians describes its aims as supporting the human rights of Palestinians.

== Leadership and membership ==
In May 2024, Tayab Ali was the director of the ICJP. ICJP membership consists of lawyers, academics and politicians.

== Actions ==
In August 2023, following a report by The Guardian suggesting an attempt by the Israeli Embassy in the UK to influence a court case, ICJP issued a statement "strongly condemn[ing]" what it described as the Israeli Embassy attempting to pervert the course of justice in relation to court cases related to actions by Palestine Action.

In October and November 2023, ICJP submitted a legal analysis to the parliament of the United Kingdom, giving advice on UK relations with the Middle East and North Africa in relation to the Israeli occupation of Palestinian territories and the proposed two-state solution.

In November 2023, ICJP stated to Canadian government officials that it would file court cases against Canadian politicians involved in war crimes in the Gaza war committed by Israelis. The ICJP referred to Canadian obligations under Article 25(3)(c) and (d) of the Rome Statute not to aid and abet the commission of war crimes and to possible investigations and prosecutions by the International Criminal Court or under universal jurisdiction.

In April 2024, ICJP stated that if evidence were found that the Elbit Hermes 450 drone responsible for the World Central Kitchen aid convoy attack were made in the UK, then pressure would increase to stop UK arms sales to Israel.

In May 2024, ICJP stated that the ban on the entry of Glasgow University rector Ghassan Abu-Sittah into Schengen Area countries, including Germany and France, was a violation of freedom of speech. ICJP stated that it was requesting lawyers in France and Germany to take action in opposition to the ban.

In April 2025, ICJP along with the Hind Rajab Foundation and Global Legal Action Network wrote to the UK attorney general to apply for an arrest warrant for Israeli Foreign Minister Gideon Sa'ar. This came after Sa'ar met with UK Foreign Secretary David Lammy in London. The request alleged that Sa'ar was responsible for the attack on Kamal Adwan hospital and the detention of Hussam Abu Safiya. The British attorney general rejected the request.

On October 20, 2025, ICJP applied for permission to bring a private prosecution against a dual British-Israeli national under the Foreign Enlistment Act 1870 for enlisting to serve with the Israel Defense Forces in both Lebanon and the West Bank during the Gaza war. However, in April 2026 Chief Magistrate Paul Goldspring rejected ICJP's request for a summons against the soldier. Goldspring stated that ICJP had withheld relevant facts from the court, including official declarations by the UK government that the Foreign Enlistment Act did not apply to the Gaza war, and described the attempted prosecution as "vexatious", politically motivated, and an abuse of process. Goldspring also held that the 1870 Act did not apply to dual nationals and said that the soldier had enlisted in the IDF before the outbreak of the war, placing him outside the scope of the Act. ICJP were ordered to pay all court costs pertaining to the case.
