= 2024 Abu Hussein school attack =

Bombing of a Gaza school by Israeli forces

Coordinates: 31°31′41.002″N 34°28′59.002″E

- Part of the second battle of Jabalia and the attacks on schools during the Gaza genocide
- Location: Jabalia refugee camp, Gaza Strip
- Date: 17 October 2024
- Target: UNRWA-run Abu Hussein school
- Attack type: Airstrike
- Deaths: 28+ Palestinians
- Injuries: 160+ Palestinians
- Perpetrator: Israel Defense Forces

On 17 October 2024, the Israel Defense Forces (IDF) bombed the UNRWA-run Abu Hussein primary school, which had been turned into a shelter for Palestinians displaced by the Gaza war, in Jabalia refugee camp in the northern Gaza Strip. The airstrike killed at least 28 Palestinians and wounded 160 others. The IDF says that it targeted terrorists operating within the building.

== Background ==
On 5 October 2024, the Israel Defense Forces (IDF) launched a new ground offensive in Jabalia, aiming to eliminate what it said were Hamas militants regrouping there. Israel imposed a siege over the area and obstructed the entry of aid to Jabalia, which the Palestinian envoy to the United Nations (UN) described as "a genocide within genocide".

== Airstrike ==
Israel struck the primary school on 17 October 2024, killing at least 28 and wounding more than 160, saying that the targeted terrorists from Hamas and Palestinian Islamic Jihad (PIJ) groups who operated from within the school. Israel named 18 men who it accused of conducting rocket attacks and attacking IDF soldiers. The Israeli military claimed to have worked to mitigate civilian harm in the airstrike, including by using aerial surveillance and a precise munition.

Hamas strongly denied the claim that it had used the United Nations Relief and Works Agency for Palestine Refugees in the Near East (UNRWA)-school for fighting purposes, and called it "nothing but lies" and a "systematic policy of the enemy to justify its crime". The director of Kamal Adwan hospital in Beit Lahia reported that the hospital was small and could not receive all of the Palestinians injured by the strike, adding that most of those presented were women and children. He also stated that there was no water to extinguish the fire, and that the attack constitutes a massacre. Several tents caught fire, causing smoke to rise.

A health ministry official stated: "Civilians and children are being killed, burned under fire". At least 5 children were killed in the strike.

== See also ==
- November 2023 Abu Hussein School airstrike
- Outline of the Gaza war
- Timeline of the Israeli–Palestinian conflict in 2024
- Timeline of the Gaza war (17 October 2024 – 26 November 2024)
- Attacks on schools during the Gaza war
- Israeli war crimes in the Gaza war
- Gaza genocide
