= Giora Eiland =

Israeli Major General (born 1952)

- גיורא איילנד
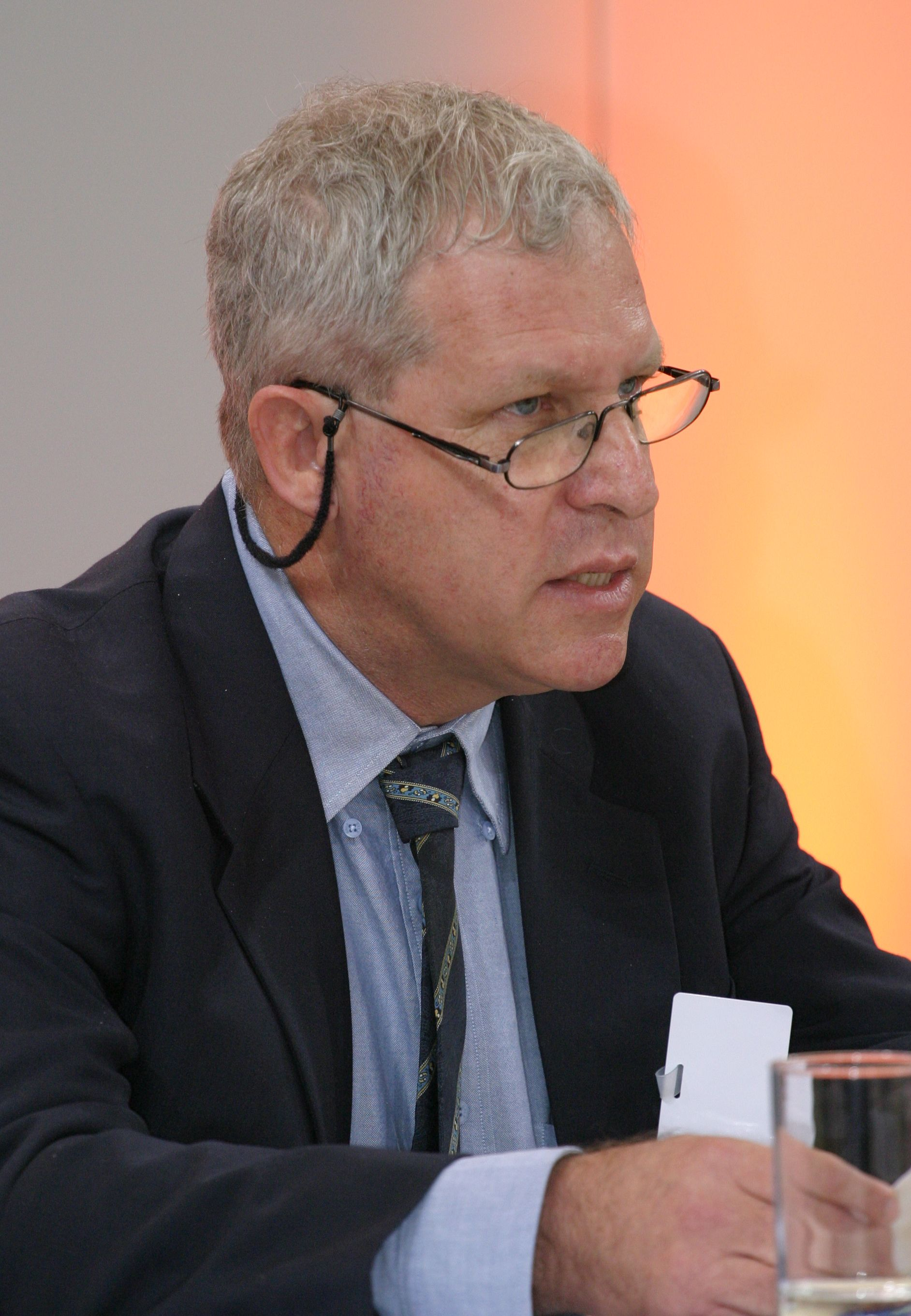
- Giora Eiland in 2004
- Born: 1952 (age 73–74); Kfar Hess, Israel
- Education: Bar Ilan University
- Military career
- Allegiance: Israel
- Branch: Israel Defense Forces
- Service years: 1970–2003
- Rank: Major General (ret.) (IDF)
- Commands: Officers School; Givati Brigade; Paratroopers and Infantry Corps; Operations Directorate; Planning Directorate
- Conflicts: Yom Kippur War; Operation Entebbe; Operation Litani; First Lebanon War; South Lebanon conflict (1982–2000); First Intifada; Second Intifada
- Other work: Head of National Security Council (Israel); Senior research associate, Institute for National Security Studies; External advisor to Givot Olam Oil

Giora Eiland (Hebrew: גיורא איילנד; born 1952) is a retired Major General of the Israel Defense Forces and a former head of the Israeli National Security Council. After his retirement from the public sector, he was a senior research associate at the Institute for National Security Studies (INSS).

Eiland is a frequent commentator and contributor on international security matters on local and foreign media. In 2007, he founded a consulting company of national security and strategic services for governments and multinational organizations. He holds an M.B.A. and B.A. in economics from Bar Ilan University.

== Career ==
=== Military service ===
Eiland joined the army in 1970, and served in the Paratroopers Brigade Battalion 890. He served in a variety of roles within the brigade: as platoon leader (1973 Battle of the Chinese Farm in the Yom Kippur War), an operations officer, company commander (1976 Operation Entebbe), vice-commander of a battalion (1978 Operation Litani), commander of 50 "Baselet" Airborne Battalion (1982 First Lebanon War) and reserve commander of the Paratroopers Brigade.

Following the First Lebanon War, Eiland served as commander of Infantry Officers School of the Chief Officer of Infantry Corps (Israel). In 1984 Eiland completed the Advanced Infantry Course at Fort Benning, Georgia, United States. After his return to Israel he was appointed as Operations Directorate officer in the Infantry Corps (Israel). In the years 1990–1992 he commanded the IDF Officers School (Training Base 1), and in the years 1992–1993 was the commander of the Givati Brigade.

In 1993, Eiland was appointed as the head of the Paratroopers and Infantry Corps in the rank of Brigadier General. In 1996 Eiland was appointed Head of Operations Division in Operations Directorate, and in 1999 he was appointed Head of Operations Directorate in rank of Major General. In this role he was involved in preparations for the IDF withdrawal from Lebanon and also in conflict with the Palestinians (Second Intifada). In 2001 he was appointed head of the Planning Directorate. Still an army officer, Eiland took part in the political process, during the Israeli–Palestinian peace process and was appointed to accompany the Foreign Minister Shimon Peres, in his talks with Yasser Arafat. Eiland also represented the Israeli security forces in talks with U.S., Palestinian and other officials. In 2003, with the end of his term in the Planning Directorate, Eiland rejected an offer to become IDF attache in Washington, and retired from the army after 33 years of service.

=== National Security Council ===
Eiland left the Planning Directorate and the IDF to accept, in January 2004, Sharon's offer that he head the National Security Council (NSC). Eiland was the fourth NSC head in the six years of the Council's existence, the others being David Ivri, Uzi Dayan, and Ephraim Halevy, and could not penetrate the walls around the Prime Minister's office. However, unlike Dayan and Levy, whose terms were marked by worsening relations with Prime Minister Sharon, Eiland had a constructive working relationship with the Prime Minister, despite their practical disagreements.

In early 2003, a few weeks after his retirement from the army and arrival to the NSC, Eiland became aware of Sharon's disengagement initiative – at that stage the initiative had more limited objectives in the Gaza Strip and broader in the West Bank. Eiland agreed that a political initiative was needed, but objected to both the content of Sharon's proposal and the procedure for preparing and presenting it. In 2004 Eiland took part in drawing up the disengagement plan in close consultations with US Advisors among them National Security Council Middle East Advisor Elliott Abrams. Eiland shuttled with Ariel Sharon's Chief of Staff, between Washington and Jerusalem to hammer up successive drafts. It was Eiland's initiative to establish a Disengagement Authority and to set a realistic schedule program. The plan, as adopted by the Israeli Government and the Knesset, is largely a result of Eiland's formulation. During the year 2005 there were reports in the media about Eiland's criticism of the policy and the national security decision-making process. After the implementation of the disengagement plan had been concluded, Eiland informed the Prime Minister that he had exhausted his ability to influence the process and he decided to resign from the NSC.

Among other tasks during his tenure, Eiland was appointed as the head of the first governmental steering committee on cyber.

On June 1, 2006, he was replaced as head of NSC by former deputy head of the Mossad, Ilan Mizrahi.

== Post-retirement activities ==
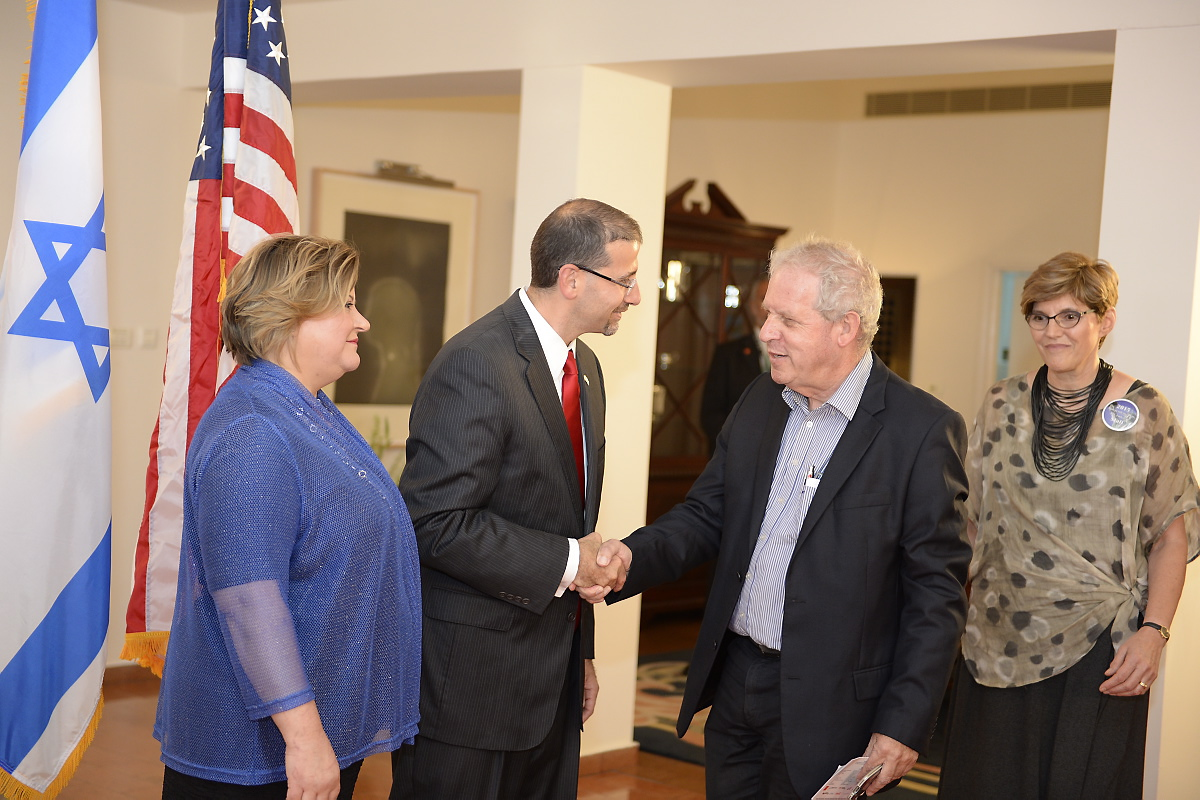
Eiland at the U.S. Embassy in Israel, 4 July 2015

=== Gilad Shalit committee ===
In 2006, Eiland was appointed by the Chief of Staff, Dan Halutz, as the head of the examination committee of experts, to investigate the capture of the Israeli soldier Gilad Shalit by the Hamas to Gaza Strip.

=== Gaza flotilla ===
In 2010, Eiland headed a team of experts examining the preparation and execution of the Gaza flotilla raid. Eiland presented the report to the chief of staff, Gabi Ashkenazi on July 12, 2010.

On May 29, 2011, Eiland said on Kol Yisrael Radio that in his view it would be better for Israel to let the next flotilla – expected to set out in late June 2011 – get through to Gaza, provided that the Government of Turkey would be willing to take responsibility for the flotilla, inspect all ships and make sure they were not carrying arms.

=== Consulting company; Egyptian gas pipeline ===
In 2007, he founded a private consulting company, giving advice to several companies in the defense industry of Israel, as well as to Israel Military Industries. The company also provides services in various settings to foreign governments, multinational corporations, and organizations. Among other projects, Eiland gave an expert's witness and submitted an expert's opinion on security aspects, in the international arbitration in the case of the Egyptian pipeline explosion which halted the flow of gas to Israel due to a series of terrorist explosions in 2011. In 2015 the arbitration ruled in favor of the Israeli prosecutor, telling the Egyptian gas companies to pay a compensation of $1.8 billion.

=== Israel–Gaza war ===
==== Public statements ====
At the beginning of the Gaza war, Eiland spoke out against an Israeli ground invasion, stating that it would be a "terrible mistake" as soldiers would have to clear every home and remove booby traps from tunnels many kilometers long, all while battling thousands of Hamas fighters. Eiland instead suggested "Israel create a humanitarian crisis in Gaza" to get the hostages back.

Eiland opposed escalating the 2023 Israel-Hezbollah Conflict, predicting that Israel would not be able to defeat Hezbollah.

On 9 August 2026, Eiland told Israeli radio station 103fm that Gaza should remained "devastated", stating: "The greater the despair in Gaza and the greater the destruction, and the greater the monument to what they did on October 7, years to come, that is good" as well as saying that the reconstruction of Gaza was also against "Israeli interests".

==== November 2023 op-ed ====
In November 2023, Eiland wrote an op-ed in which he stated that most Gazans support Hamas and that "Gaza women are the mothers, sisters, and spouses of Hamas murderers." He also wrote that: "Epidemics in the South [of Gaza] will bring victory closer and will decrease casualties among IDF soldiers", arguing that this tactic would encourage Hamas to surrender. In response, 15 Israeli public health experts condemned his op-ed as advocating the weaponization of epidemics and predicted that any epidemic in Gaza would harm Palestinian civilians as well as Israeli hostages and troops.

Since then, Eiland's op-ed has been referenced in various articles, especially in articles criticizing Israel's actions in the war. B'Tselem referred to Eiland's op-ed as evidence that the humanitarian crisis in Gaza is the "intended result" of Israeli policy. Lorenzo Kamel referenced the op-ed while arguing that Israel is trying to make Gaza unlivable. A New York Times op-ed used it as evidence that Israelis may feel justified in "using suffering to achieve military goals". Additionally, The Times of Israel referenced Eiland's op-ed in an article about an IDF soldier who died of a fungal infection acquired in Gaza.

==== General's Plan ====
Eiland is the lead author of the controversial General's Plan. The plan proposes that the Israeli military gives all civilians in northern Gaza one week in which to evacuate the area, after which they would be considered combatants and would be targeted for death by the military. The plan would also block all food, water, fuel, and medical supplies from entering northern Gaza. The plan aims for the destruction of Hamas, the release of any remaining hostages, and a subsequent indefinite occupation by the Israeli military. Eiland stated that Hamas would "either have to surrender or to starve," saying that "it will not be necessary" for the Israeli military to kill everyone in northern Gaza as "people will not be able to live there. The water will dry up."

The plan was condemned by Israeli human rights organisation Gisha, who argued that it was "absolutely not the case" that "if the population is given a chance to evacuate and they don’t, then somehow they all turn into legitimate military targets." Spokesperson for the United States Department of State Matthew Miller stated that it was "the virtual unanimous opinion of the international community" opposing "any occupation of Gaza, any reduction in the size of Gaza."

According to CNN, the Israeli military adopted a modified version of the plan in October 2024. This plan was proposed by the Eiland-led Forum of Reserve Commanders and Fighters, and includes orders for all residents to leave within a week; a full siege on water, food, and fuel; and then to arrest or kill all who remain. In response, Tamer Qarmout, a professor of public policy at the Doha Institute, stated, "We’re talking about another wave of displacement – another Nakba. The future of Gaza is horrifying. I still worry about what’s coming next. The demographic re-engineering of the Gaza Strip is in progress now."

On December 10, 2024, Eiland was asked whether the plan was being implemented. He replied that it was not being implemented at all, and that what was being done in the Gaza Strip was the opposite of the plan. He said that military pressure was being used to try to achieve the three goals of neutralizing the military capacity of Hamas, bringing home the hostages, and putting an end to the rule of Hamas in the strip, but that military pressure cannot achieve the latter two goals. This was leading to Israel being embroiled in unnecessary warfare and losing dozens of men. He said his plan, on the contrary, was to surround the northern third of the strip and implement a siege, forcing Hamas to surrender without hard fighting, and taking territory to be used as a card to play against Hamas. He said the only ways to achieve the goals were economic pressure or taking territory.
