= Izbat Beit Hanoun =

Village in North Gaza, Palestine

Arabic transcription(s)
  - Arabic: عزبة بيت حانون
- Interactive map of Izbat Beit Hanoun
- Location of Izbat Beit Hanoun within Palestine
- Coordinates: 31°32′54″N 34°31′22″E
- Palestine grid: 100/103
- State: State of Palestine
- Governorate: North Gaza
- Control: Israel Defense Forces

Population (2006)
  - Total: 7,383

Izbat Beit Hanoun (Arabic: عزبة بيت حانون) is a Palestinian village in the North Gaza Governorate of the State of Palestine, in the Gaza Strip. It is located between Beit Lahia and Beit Hanoun, about 2 km (1.2 mi) south of the barrier between North Gaza and Israel. The closest border crossing is Erez Crossing. According to the Palestinian Central Bureau of Statistics, Izbat Beit Hanoun had a population of 7,383 in mid-2006.

== History ==
=== Gaza war (2023–present) ===
Izbat Beit Hanoun was one of the villages that was hit by the Israeli military in the first two weeks of the Gaza war, with satellite footage from 21 October 2023 showing damaged and destroyed homes and other buildings. The village sustained more damage to roads and buildings in December 2024 and January 2025.
