= Joyce Msuya =

Tanzanian microbiologist and environmental scientist

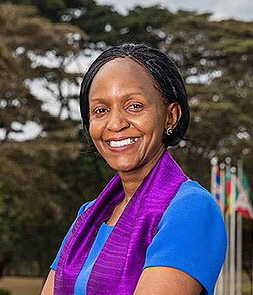
- Msuya in 2019

Acting Under-Secretary-General of the United Nations for Humanitarian Affairs and Emergency Relief Coordinator
- In office 2024–2024
- Secretary-General: António Guterres

Assistant Secretary-General of the United Nations for Humanitarian Affairs and Deputy Emergency Relief Coordinator United Nations OCHA
- Incumbent
- Assumed office 2022
- Secretary-General: António Guterres

Acting Under-Secretary-General of the United Nations and Executive Director of the United Nations Environment Programme
- In office 2018–2019
- Secretary-General: António Guterres
- Preceded by: Erik Solheim
- Succeeded by: Inger Andersen

Assistant Secretary-General of the United Nations and Deputy Executive Director of the United Nations Environment Programme
- In office 2018–2021
- Secretary-General: António Guterres

Personal details
- Born: Joyce Msuya; 1968 (age 57–58) Tanzania
- Education: University of Strathclyde (Bachelor of Science in Biochemistry and Immunology); University of Ottawa (Master of Science in Microbiology and Immunology)
- Occupation: Microbiologist and environmental scientist

Joyce Msuya is a Tanzanian microbiologist and environmental scientist who has been serving as assistant secretary-general for Humanitarian Affairs and deputy emergency relief coordinator in the United Nations Office for the Coordination of Humanitarian Affairs since 2021. From 2018 to 2021, she served as the deputy executive director of the United Nations Environment Programme (UNEP) at the level of assistant secretary-general.

== Early life and education ==
Msuya was born in Tanzania, circa 1968. She obtained a Bachelor of Science degree in Biochemistry and Immunology from the University of Strathclyde, Glasgow, Scotland, in 1992. She later graduated with a Master of Science degree in Microbiology and Immunology from the University of Ottawa, Ontario, Canada, in 1996.

== Career ==
=== Early career ===
Before joining the World Bank Group, Msuya worked as an International Health Policy Analyst with the Liu Center for Global Studies (now Liu Institute for Global Issues) at the University of British Columbia in Canada. Previously, she worked in Tanzania on various assignments, in the private and public sectors.

=== Career at the World Bank ===
Msuya joined the World Bank in 1998 as a health specialist. She went on to build expertise in development economics as well as lending operations in the health sector during her tenure with the International Bank for Reconstruction and Development. In 2001, she joined the World Bank's Development Economics vice presidency as advisor to the Senior Vice President & Chief Economist, Professor Lord Nicholas Stern. From 2005 to 2011, she worked at the International Finance Corporation, in the Departments of Operational Strategy and Manufacturing, Agribusiness & Services, where she rose to the position of principal strategy officer.

In 2011, Msuya was assigned to the Beijing office of the World Bank Institute as regional coordinator for East Asia & the Pacific, focusing on support to the bank's operational work in its efforts to "fight poverty and promote shared prosperity". In April 2014, she was selected by senior management to establish and manage the first World Bank Group office in the Republic of Korea, serving for three years as the World Bank special representative to the Republic of Korea and head of the World Bank Group (WBG) Office based in Songdo, Incheon, South Korea.

Msuya subsequently served as an advisor for the World Bank's vice president for the East Asia and Pacific region, based in Washington, DC.

=== Career at UNEP ===
From 2018 to 2021, Msuya served as the deputy executive director of the United Nations Environment Programme (UNEP) at the level of assistant secretary-general. She was appointed to this position by United Nations Secretary-General António Guterres on 21 May 2018, for a five-year term. She replaced Ibrahim Thiaw of Mauritania, who had served out his term.

Following the resignation of Erik Solheim in November 2018, Msuya was appointed acting executive director of UNEP.

== Personal life ==
Msuya is married and has two children.
