= Inger Andersen =

Inger Andersen can refer to

- Inger Marie Andersen (1930–1995), Norwegian actress
- Inger Andersen (environmentalist) (born 1958), Danish environmentalist
