= 2024 Rufaida school attack =

Bombing of a Gaza school by Israeli forces

- Part of the Gaza war
- Location: 31.4172°N 34.3508°E; Deir al-Balah, Gaza Strip
- Date: 10 October 2024
- Target: Rufaida school
- Attack type: Airstrikes
- Deaths: 28+ Palestinians
- Injuries: 54+ Palestinians
- Perpetrator: Israel Defense Forces

On 10 October 2024, the Israel Defense Forces (IDF) bombed Rufaida school-turned-shelter in Deir al-Balah in the central Gaza Strip. The airstrikes killed at least 28 Palestinians and injured more than 54. The IDF did not issue a warning before striking the building, which was sheltering 1,000 people that were displaced by the Israeli invasion of the Gaza Strip. The IDF said it have struck "command post used by terror operatives within the compound."

== Airstrike ==
Two airstrikes hit two rooms in Rufaida school where food aid was being stored and distributed. The airstrikes destroyed three floors of the building. The Gaza Health Ministry reported that more than 28 Palestinians were killed in the strikes, including at least two children, five women and three men in their 60s, and at least 54 were injured, calling it a "new massacre" by the IDF. The Palestinian Red Crescent confirmed the death toll. The IDF daid it have struck "command post used by terror operatives within the compound." CNN footage showed several children being carried into ambulances, with their faces covered in blood. Eyewitnesses reported seeing "innocent children scattered across the floor" and "heads blown off". Al Jazeera journalist in Deir al-Balah, Tareq Abu Azzoum, reported that children and women "were torn to pieces by the intensity of the strike", which made it difficult to identify dead bodies.
