= Kamal Adwan Hospital sieges =

2023-2024 Gazan hospital siege

- Part of the Gaza war
Date	12–16 December 2023; 24–31 May 2024; October 2024; November 2024; December 2024
Location	Kamal Adwan Hospital, Beit Lahia 31°32′19″N 34°30′4″E
Status	operational

During the Gaza war, the Kamal Adwan Hospital, a hospital in Beit Lahia, Gaza Strip, Palestine, was besieged multiple times by the Israel Defense Forces (IDF) until Israel shut it down on 27 December 2024.

On 27 December 2024, the Israeli army stormed the hospital, removed patients and staff, and left the hospital burning. At the time Kamal Adwan was the last remaining major medical facility in northern Gaza. The IDF said that it targeted Hamas militants in a command center in the hospital. Hospital staff have denied these allegations, and sources have noted that the IDF has not provided evidence for their claims.

== Background ==
Founded in 2002 to treat Palestinians injured in the Second Intifada, the Kamal Adwan Hospital was named after Fatah leader, Kamal Abdel Hafiz Adwan. The second largest medical facility in Northern Gaza after the Indonesian Hospital, Kamal Adwan Hospital frequently experiences shortages of medical supplies and equipment due to the blockade of the Gaza Strip and has been damaged in previous wars.

The Kamal Adwan Hospital was a site of conflict during the Gaza war following the Israeli invasion of the Gaza Strip. Israel's targeting of Kamal Adwan came amidst a broader Israeli targeting of health facilities in the Gaza Strip. On 3 December, the IDF struck in the vicinity of Kamal Adwan hospital, killing at least four people according to Al-Jazeera. On 11 December, the director of Kamal Adwan Hospital stated Israel had killed two mothers and their newborn babies when Israel targeted its maternity ward. According to UN News, the "maternity department was reportedly hit during shelling and two mothers were killed". As of August 2024, the Kamal Adwan Hospital houses the only functioning neo-natal ICU left in Gaza.

== Gaza war ==
=== December 2023 ===
On 12 December, Israel raided the Kamal Adwan Hospital. The head of pediatrics stated the IDF had ordered all men and boys above age 16 to leave the hospital to be searched. Seventy medical staffers were arrested and taken to an unknown location. The head of the World Health Organization (WHO), Dr. Tedros Adhanom Ghebreyesus, stated he was "extremely worried" about the situation at Kamal Adwan.

The IDF released a video claiming that it showed militants near Kamal Adwan surrendering their weapons. These claims were quickly challenged by family members who identified their non-combatant relatives.

On 14 December, the Gaza Health Ministry (GHM) reported that 2,500 internally displaced persons (IDPs) had been forcibly evacuated, and that IDF soldiers had prevented medical staff from continuing support to 12 babies in intensive care and ten emergency department patients, leading to two deaths. Dr. Tedros Adhanom Ghebreyesus stated patients had evacuated Kamal Adwan hospital, resulting in the deaths of patients, including a nine-year-old.

The United Nations Office for the Coordination of Humanitarian Affairs (OCHA) stated on 16 December that according to media reports "an Israeli military bulldozer flattened the tents of a number of internally displaced persons outside the hospital, killing and wounding an unconfirmed number of people". One reporter described "a terrifying massacre and unspeakable scenes" and stating: "Dozens of displaced, sick and wounded people were buried alive". A man stated his 25-year-old son had been buried alive by IDF bulldozers at Kamal Adwan and in the same report the IDF was accused of necroviolence by running over corpses with a bulldozer. A video purporting to be footage of the incident circulated but France 24 reported that the video was unrelated to the hospital siege.

Director general of the Gaza Health Ministry (GHM), Munir al-Bursh, said he was shot at by Israeli forces while giving a press conference in front of the hospital, and that Israeli forces arrested 70 medical professionals.

Israel said that the hospital was used by Hamas for military purposes, arguing that this invalidated the protection provided by the Geneva Conventions. Israel said it had arrested 80 Hamas operatives in the base and had found weapons in the location. Staff reported the Israeli troops shooting at doctors and setting dogs to maul handicapped patients.

==== Detention and interrogation of hospital director ====
During the 12 December raid, Israel captured 90 individuals, among them was the hospital's director, Ahmed Kahlout. On 19 December, Israeli security agency, Shin Bet, released a video of Kahlout confessed to being a Hamas militant and said the hospital was being used for military purposes. The Gaza Health Ministry (GHM) said confessions were extracted under duress.

During the video confession, Kahlout said he has the "rank of brigadier general". The Gaza Ministry of Health (GHM) clarified that Kahlout was part of the Palestinian Authority's Ministry of Interior, under the department of "Military Medical Services". The ministry stated that military-style ranks are frequently used within medical corps all around the world. Further in the video, Kahlout said that many hospital staff members, including doctors, nurses, paramedics, and others, also served as members of Hamas's al-Qassam brigades, and that Hamas concealed weapons within the hospital and integrated its operations into its functions. The Gaza Health Ministry (GHM) said that: "Kahlot’s confessions were extracted under the use of force, coercion, torture and intimidation".

=== May 2024 ===
In May 2024, Israel bombed the vicinity of the hospital, which the World Health Organization (WHO) chief Tedros Adhanom Ghebreyesus stated on 19 May was "deeply worrisome". Adhanom Ghebreyesus stated on 21 May that the hospital had been attacked four times in the prior twenty four hours. The same day, the hospital was evacuated, though patients connected to machines were unable to be evacuated. Medics stated on 22 May that missiles hit the hospital's emergency department.

On 24 May, Israeli forces massed outside the hospital entrance, leading the hospital's head of nursing to state: "It is considered practically, because it is besieged, not operational". The hospital was hit twice by artillery. On 25 May, the head of pediatrics stated Israeli forces were still surrounding the hospital. Upon Israel's withdrawal from the Jabalia refugee camp, Gaza’s Hamas-run civil defense agency stated that the Israeli military had destroyed the hospital's main electrical generators. In August 2024, officials at Kamal Adwan Hospital warned that the hospital was at risk of closure due to lack of fuel and medicine, putting 11 children at risk of death.

=== October and November 2024 ===
In October 2024 during the siege of Northern Gaza, the Israeli military ordered the complete evacuation of the Kamal Adwan Hospital within 24 hours. Dr. Hussam Abu Safia, the hospital's director, said the hospital would remain in service, stating: "We have babies and newborns that are in the ICU. Even if we can evacuate a few patients, we cannot leave the hospital because there is no other hospital that is providing services and treatment to children". As Israel's deadline for evacuation, the Israeli army was reported to be advancing on the hospital while "committing massacres against civilians". On 24 October 2024, the hospital director stated the Israeli military was committing "deliberate murder". He stated: "There are more than 15 cases that need surgeries that we cannot perform in the hospital".

On 24 October 2024, video showed Israeli tanks firing on the hospital. On 25 October, Israel raided the hospital. The Palestinian health ministry stated 600 patients, companions, and staff were trapped. The following day, the World Health Organization (WHO) stated that while the hospital was still under siege, it had regained contact with its employees there, stating that four employees were injured, 44 health workers had been detained, and four ambulances were damaged. The Gaza Ministry of Health stated that Israeli forces had detained all male medical staff. On 27 October, Dr. Khalil Daqran stated only one medical staff remained in the entire hospital, and that Israeli forces had set parts of the hospital on fire, destroyed its entrances, and demolished walls. On 28 October, the IDF said that it captured 100 Hamas militants during the raid on Kamal Adwan Hospital. Both local medics and Hamas denied there was any militant presence at the hospital. Later that day, the IDF withdrew from the hospital.

Following the raid, the Gaza Ministry of Health said that two children had died in the intensive care unit follow the failure of the hospitals generators, and that the oxygen station was targeted". One of the two remaining doctors at the hospital warned that "patients and the injured are strewn all over the hospital floor". Officials stated one doctor had been killed by an Israeli drone. The WHO stated they had continued with patient evacuations, as Kamal Adwan's building was damaged, four ambulances were destroyed, and patients needed medical supplies, food, and water. On 31 October, the UN stated a bombing on the hospital's third floor had destroyed critical medical supplies. On 4 November 2024, the head of the WHO, Tedros Adhanom Ghebreyesus, wrote that shortly after a WHO mission, a reported attack on the third floor injured six child patients. The same day, the health ministry stated that there were "many" injuries amongst patients and staff following Israel: "violently bombard[ing]" the hospital.

On 30 November 2024, the head of the intensive care unit (ICU), Dr. Ahmed Al-Kahlout, was killed.

=== December 2024 ===
On 6 December 2024, the IDF conducted a "series of airstrikes on the northern and western sides of the hospital", which were followed with "heavy and direct gunfire", according to the director of Kamal Adwan Hospital. At least 30 people were killed by Israeli bombing, and another 20 were left injured. Later Israeli troops stormed the hospital and killed four doctors, leaving the hospital without any experienced surgeons. According to the World Health Organization (WHO), Israel issued "no warning" prior to the Israeli storming and strikes.

==== 26–27 December ====
On 26 December, an Israeli attack killed 50 people in a building adjacent to the hospital that was housing the hospital staff and their families.

On 27 December, the Israeli army stormed the hospital, and hospital officials said Israeli troops set parts of the hospital on fire. The Israeli army forced all patients and staff to leave, and videos showed that Israel had stripped the staff to their underwear and forced them to march from the hospital to an unknown destination. The Israeli army also reportedly switched off oxygen supplies.

The surgical department, laboratory and a storehouse were initially set on fire, and this fire then spread to other parts of the hospital. Footage in local media showed smoke rising from the hospital. Israeli army claimed they never entered the hospital, that the fire in the hospital was "small", and that there was "no connection" between the fire and Israeli army's activities.

The Israeli army said that it detained 240 individuals it claimed were Hamas operatives during the operation and that the hospital served as a critical point for Hamas operations. IDF reservists described the hospital as containing areas designated for military use: "It was made to look like a hospital, and patients were brought there just for appearances. In reality, there are entire sections meant solely for the entry of Hamas terrorists". The IDF has not provided evidence for these claims. The IDF stated that it had provided advanced warnings to civilians and staff, urging evacuation prior to the military actions, to minimize harm to innocent individuals.

The director of the hospital, Hussam Abu Safiya, was one of the individuals detained by the IDF, and video footage was released showing him walking in his white coat towards IDF armored vehicles. Some Palestinian sources have said that Abu Safiya is being held in the Sde Teiman detention camp, a detention camp which reportedly holds detainees in harsh conditions.^{[1]}

Kamal Adwan Hospital was out of service, and its staff, patients, and equipment were transferred to the Indonesian Hospital, also in Jabalia.

On 12 February 2026, a paramedic who was detained from the hospital, Hatem Ismail Rayyan, was pronounced dead under Israeli custody.

== Reactions ==
Palestinian Health Minister Mai al-Kaila called for a probe into Israeli actions at Kamal Adwan. Israel says the hospital is a "Hamas terrorist stronghold", without providing any evidence. Hospital staff have denied the allegations.

The Council on American–Islamic Relations (CAIR) called for a United Nations international probe. Tedros Adhanom Ghebreyesus stated that the WHO was appalled at the hospital's "effective destruction". The OHCHR, which had recently reported that Israeli attacks (including the sieges of Kamal Adwan Hospital) have brought the Gazan healthcare system to "the brink of total collapse", said that the violence against hospitals raised "grave concerns". In response, Israel said that it does not attack civilians and that it facilitated the evacuation of patients and staff to the Indonesian Hospital, providing generators, fuel, and medical equipment. Volker Türk, the UN High Commissioner for Human Rights, said that: "Israel did not substantiate many of these claims, which are often vague and broad. In some cases, they appear to be contradicted by publicly available information". He also called for an independent investigation into Israel's attacks on healthcare facilities and personnel. The WHO also noted that the Indonesian Hospital "lacks the necessary equipment and supplies" for the patients who had been moved there, as well as condemning the reports of people being "stripped and forced to walk towards southern Gaza".

Hamas has accused the U.S. and other Western countries of providing cover for Israeli war crimes.

Abu Safiya's detainment has been condemned by multiple sources. Amnesty International called for his release and expressed concern for his wellbeing due to a "great risk of torture and ill-treatment". Hundreds of healthcare workers have called for Abu Safiya's release on social media. WHO also expressed concern for the detainees and noted the deteriorating condition of the healthcare system in Gaza. UN Special Rapporteurs Francesca Albanese and Tlaleng Mofokeng condemned the attacks on Kamal Adwan Hospital and Abu Safiya's detainment as "part of a pattern by Israel to continuously bombard, destroy and fully annihilate the realisation of the right to health in Gaza".

== See also ==
- Attacks on health facilities during the Gaza war
- Al-Shifa Hospital siege
- Gaza genocide
