= Gisha (human rights organization) =

Israeli human rights organization

- גישה
- Established: 2005 (20 years ago)
- Types: human rights group
- Headquarters: Tel Aviv
- Country: Israel
- Coordinates: 32°03′42″N 34°46′51″E

Gisha (literally: access) is an Israeli human rights organization, founded in 2005.

== Example of projects ==
Israel restricts movement of Palestinian residents between the West Bank and the Gaza Strip. Israel has implemented a policy of allowing Palestinian movement from the West Bank to the Gaza Strip, but making it quite difficult for Gaza residents to move to the West Bank. Israel typically refuses to allow Gaza residents to leave for the West Bank, even when the Gaza resident is originally a West Bank resident. Gisha has helped Gaza residents who had moved from the West Bank to the Gaza Strip return to the West Bank by filing petitions to Israeli authorities arguing that extremely pressing personal circumstances provide humanitarian grounds for relief.

== See also ==
- Human rights in Israel
- Hamoked
- Alternative information center
- Bustan
