= Attacks on Jabalia refugee camp (2023–present) =

Airstrike in the Gaza Strip

Jabalia refugee camp airstrikes
- Part of the refugee camp airstrikes of the Gaza war and genocide
- Location within the Gaza Strip
- Location: 31°32′14″N 34°29′47″E; Jabalia refugee camp, Gaza Strip
- Date: 9 October 2023 – present (3 years, 1 month and 1 week)
- Target: Jabalia refugee camp
- Attack type: Airstrike, siege
- Deaths: 939+
- Injuries: 1,000+
- Perpetrator: Israel Defense Forces

From 9 October 2023, as part of the Gaza war, the Israel Defense Forces (IDF) has conducted airstrikes in Jabalia refugee camp, saying it was a stronghold for Hamas and other militant groups.

In Jabalia camp, a densely populated region of Gaza, over sixty people were killed in airstrikes on 31 October, and much of the market was destroyed. Forty-five people were killed in an airstrike on the next day, and part of a residential complex was destroyed.

On 31 May 2024, the IDF withdrew from Jabalia. Palestinian officials said that 70% of the refugee camp was destroyed. The Israeli military said that it had destroyed Palestinian rocket launchers and over 10 kilometers of underground tunnels, as well as recovered the bodies of seven Israeli hostages.

== Background ==
The Jabalia refugee camp market is considered one of the most lively areas in the Gaza Strip. It is located in the northeast of Gaza City. There is a residential area in the market, the Al-Ternis area, which is considered part of the market, the largest commercial market in Gaza. UNRWA registered 116,011 Palestinian refugees in the camp.

== October 2023 strikes ==
=== 9 October ===
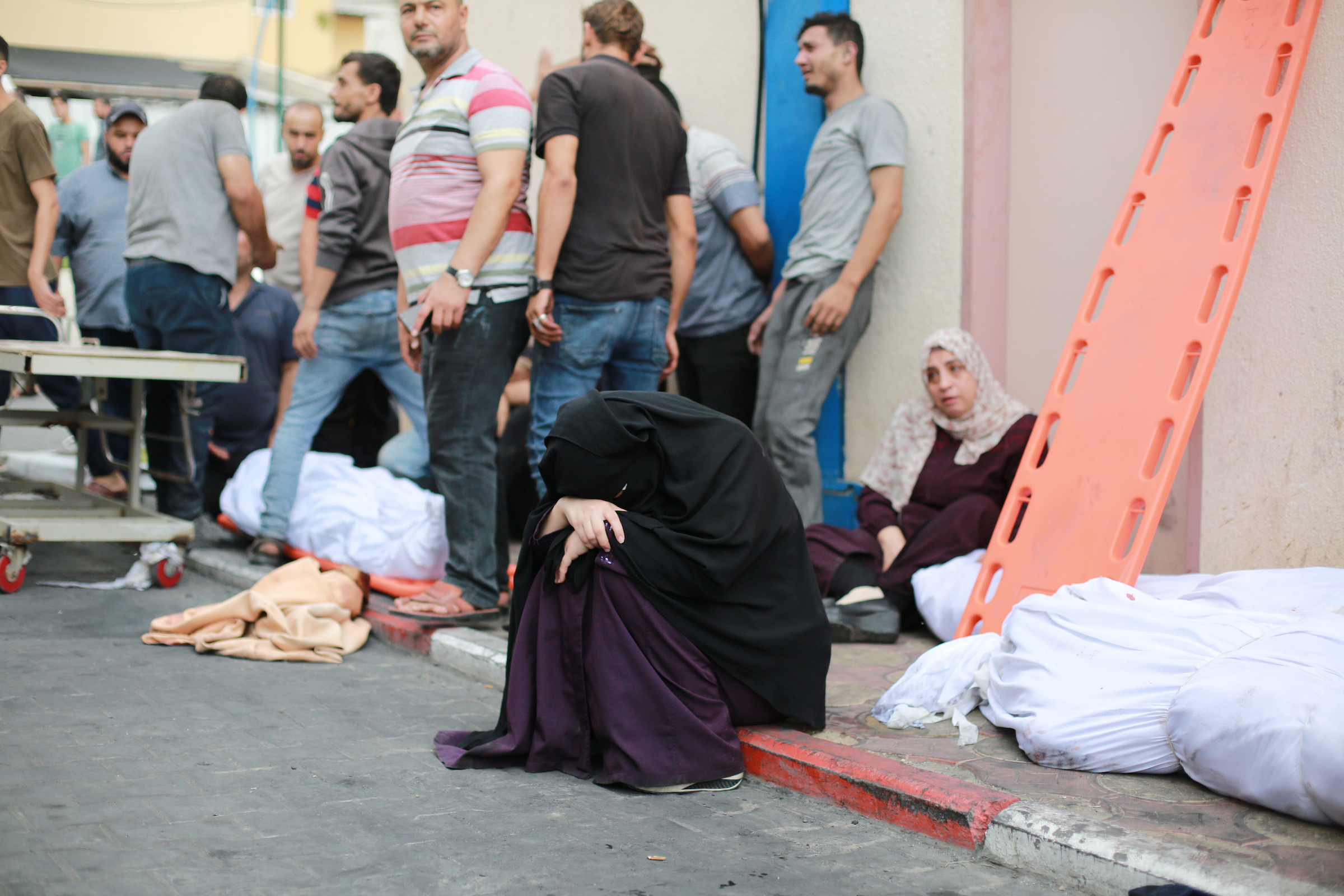
Palestinians transport dead and injured to the Indonesia Hospital, 9 October 2023

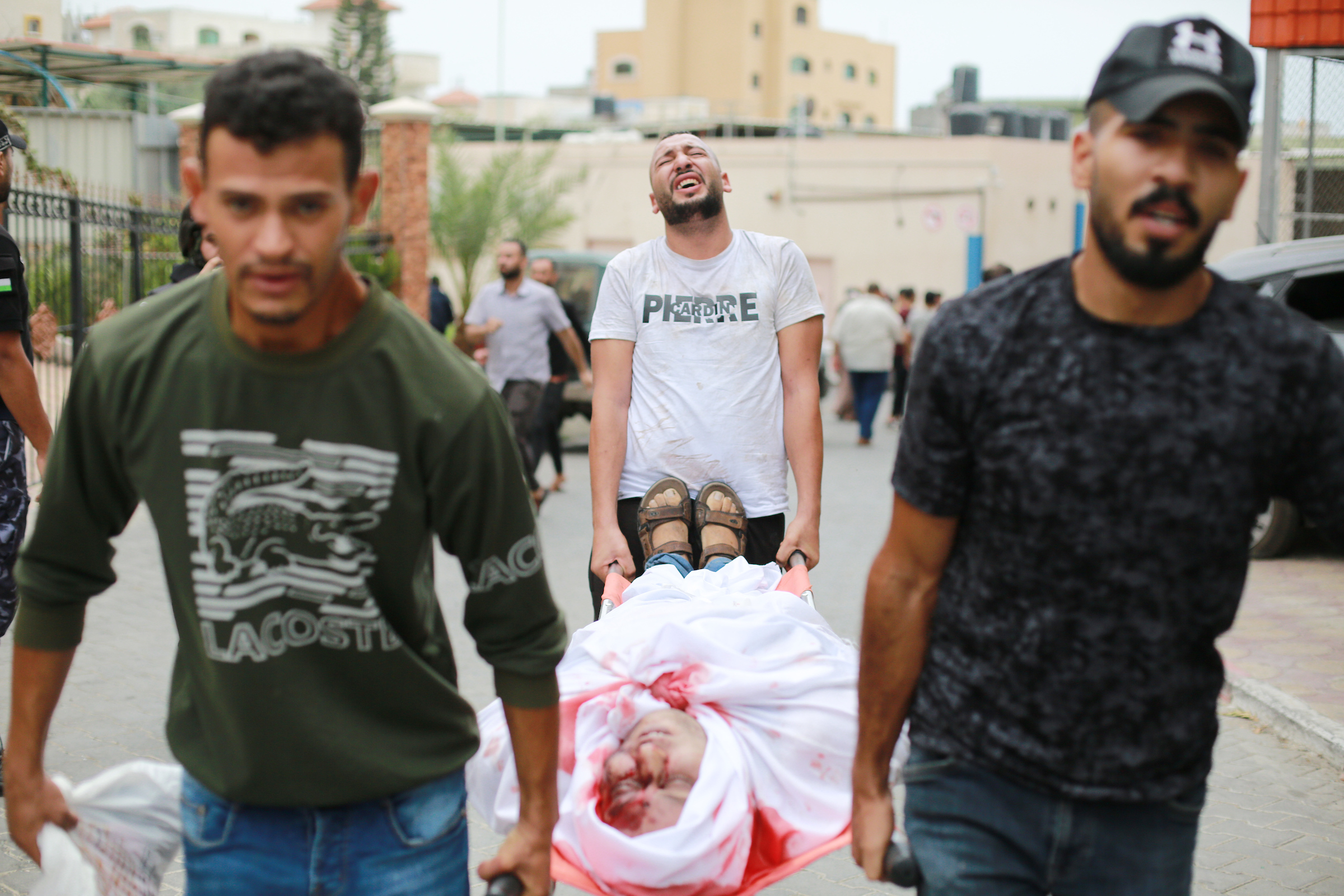
Palestinians transport dead and injured to the Indonesia Hospital, 9 October 2023

Following Israeli airstrikes on other areas of Gaza, internally displaced Gazans fled to the Jabaliya camp. At the time of the attack, between 10.30 and 11.30, the market was completely full, with customers and vendors stocking up on goods. No advance warning was given for the airstrike which hit the al-Trans area of the Jabalia market, one of the most populated areas of Jabaliya. Survivors of the attack, speaking to France 24, stated that the airstrike "hit in the heart of the market", and in the immediate aftermath, there were many dead. Many of the bodies were unable to be recovered in the days following the airstrike, due to a lack of equipment.

A rescue worker speaking to the New York Times stated that the death toll was over sixty people killed, and the entire market and surrounding buildings were destroyed. Gaza's health ministry declined to give a full estimate, but reported "dozens" of dead and wounded. A later United Nations investigation verified at least 42 killed, including 14 children, not counting a further 18 casualties.

The Israeli government claimed that the Jabalia airstrike targeted elements of Hamas located in a mosque in the Jabalia camp. Amnesty International investigated the airstrike in its report on the Gaza genocide. The report said there was no evidence of a military objective and that the "Israeli military made contradictory remarks and failed to substantiate them." The Amnesty report concluded the strike was a likely war crime.

=== 12 October ===
On 12 October, a second airstrike on the Jabalia camp hit a residential building. Gaza's Interior Ministry reported 45 people were killed, and at least four others injured. Some were sheltering there after being displaced from Beit Hanoun.

=== 19 October ===
On 19 October, the camp was hit by a third airstrike, killing 18 refugees.

=== 20 October ===
Israeli warplanes struck a house and the market of the refugee camp.

=== 22 October ===
The camp was bombed for a fourth time during a particularly intense bombardment of Gaza. Multiple homes were bombed and at least 30 bodies have been recovered from the rubble.

=== 31 October ===
On 31 October, the camp was bombed again by Israeli fighter jets. The IDF said the attack was meant to target a key leader of the 7 October attacks Ibrahim Biari, as well as a "vast underground tunnel complex" beneath the camp that according to the IDF Biari was commanding operations from. Hamas denied the presence of any commander and said Israel was using these claims as an excuse for the attack.

An eyewitness interviewed by CNN spoke of "apocalyptic scenes":

"Children were carrying other injured children and running, with grey dust filling the air. Bodies were hanging on the rubble, many of them unrecognized. Some were bleeding and others were burnt. ... I saw women screaming and confused. They didn't know whether to cry for losing their children or run and look for them, especially since many children were playing in the neighborhood."

Atef Abu Seif, Minister of Culture of the Palestinian Authority of President Mahmoud Abbas and a well-known critic of Hamas, likewise spoke of "apocalyptic" scenes to Der Spiegel, saying more than 50 houses were "smashed, crushed. In each house there were dozens of people, families and relatives who had fled here from outside because their areas were bombed ... They bombed the center, the heart of the refugee camp. No place in all of Palestine is probably as densely populated as this. Now we can't even make out where which building began and ended."

Al Jazeera reporter Anas Al Shareef was on the scene, stating, "It's a massive massacre. It is hard to count the number of buildings that have been destroyed here." Nebal Farsakh, a spokesperson for the Palestinian Red Crescent, described the scene as "absolutely horrific." More than a hundred people were reported missing beneath the rubble. The Gaza Interior Ministry stated the camp had been "completely destroyed," with preliminary estimates of about 400 wounded or dead. The director of the Indonesia Hospital reported more than 50 dead.

IDF spokesperson Daniel Hagari confirmed that Israeli fighter jets attacked the refugee camp. IDF spokesman Richard Hecht described civilian deaths as a tragic consequence of war and accused Hamas of using the local population as human shields, noting that civilians had been warned to move south.

According to Airwars, the strike killed at least 126 people – 68 of them minors – in addition to Biari, and injured a further 280 people.

== November strikes ==
=== 1 November ===
Less than a day after the 31 October airstrike which killed over 100 people, Jabalia was bombed again. The Civil Defense in Gaza described the airstrike as a "second massacre" which destroyed several buildings surrounding the camp and killed at least 80 people and wounded hundreds more. The IDF said the strike killed "the head of [Hamas's] anti-tank missile unit, Muhammad A'sar". Airwars lists at least 86 civilians – including at least 25 women and at least 30 children – killed and hundreds reported injured for this strike.

=== 2 November ===
On 2 November, another airstrike in the Jabalia refugee camp hit the UNRWA-sponsored Abu Hussein school, home to many displaced Gazans.

=== 4 November ===
External videos
- Gazan child speaks of having to carry decapitated body after Israeli strike on Jabalia on 4 November (via The Irish Times)

On 4 November, a UNRWA spokeswoman confirmed reports that Israel had conducted another airstrike against a UN-run school in the Jabalia refugee camp. According to the Gaza health ministry, the attack on the Al-Fakhoura school killed fifteen and wounded dozens more. Reuters reported having obtained a video of a boy crying in despair: "I was standing here when three bombings happened, I carried a body and another decapitated body with my own hands. God will take my vengeance." According to UNRWA, at least one strike hit the schoolyard, where displaced families had set up their tents. In response to the strike, Al Jazeera remarked Israel was "trying to eliminate all sources of survival for the civilian population to force the evacuation to the southern part of Gaza."

=== 13 November ===
Israel bombed the camp, destroying twelve houses and killing more than 30 people. The civil defence team reported being unable to rescue injured people from the rubble due to a lack of equipment.

=== 14 November ===
Israeli airstrikes killed two volleyball players Hassan Zuaiter and Ibrahim Qusaya at the refugee camp.

=== 17 November ===
Israel targeted several buildings, including a UN-run school and a family home, killing at least 82 people, including 19 children. Residents and rescue workers reportedly used axes, hammers, and their bare hands to try to find survivors.

=== 23 November ===
On 23 November 2023, an Israeli airstrike bombed the Abu Hussein School in Jabalia camp, which was being used by the United Nations Refugee Agency (UNRWA) as a shelter. At least 27 people were killed in the attack, with multiple injuries reported. The Israeli missile fell on Abu Hussein School in the morning when thousands of people were sheltering inside of it.

== December strikes ==
=== 2 December ===
Residential blocks were bombed, killing a number of people and burying many others in rubble. One resident told Al Jazeera, "We can hear voices from under the debris." The Council on American-Islamic Relations condemned the attack, stating there were more than 100 civilian killed.

=== 5 December ===
On 5 December, the IDF stated they had the entire Jabalia camp surrounded.

=== 6 December ===
On 6 December, airstrikes on the camp reportedly intensified. A resident stated, "We cannot recover the wounded or even bury our dead. The world has abandoned us. This is hell."

=== 8 December ===
Dozens were killed in an airstrike on the northern Jabalia refugee camp.

=== 15 December ===
The Gaza health ministry said Israeli airstrikes in the camp killed at least 90 people.

=== 19 December ===
An attack on the camp killed at least 13 people. A reporter on the scene stated, "Victims are just lying on the ground. Many have been killed, bodies ripped apart. Even animals aren’t spared. The scale of the destruction is massive because this area was purposely bombed by Israeli fighter jets. Bodies are everywhere. This is beyond description."

=== 20 December ===
46 people were killed in an Israeli attack.

=== 22 December ===
16 members of one family were killed in an airstrike. A total of 30 people were killed.

=== 23 December ===
Dozens were killed in a bombing with rescuers unable to reach the wounded. The attack was described as a carpet bombing.

=== 25 December ===
Small businesses across Jabalia were destroyed by Israeli airstrikes.

=== 26 December ===
Massive destruction was reported after Israeli strikes near the Saad bin Abi Waqqas Mosque.

== January 2024 strikes ==
=== 1 January ===
Six people were killed in an air raid.

=== 5 January ===
50 homes were destroyed in the al-Sikka area of Jabalia.

=== 20 January ===
Multiple people were killed after a house was destroyed in a bombing.

=== 23 January ===
The Palestinian Red Crescent reported three were killed and ten wounded in an airstrike.

=== 24 January ===
At least a dozen people were reported killed in an airstrike on a multistory family home.

== February strikes ==
=== 6 February ===
10 people were reported killed and 10 injured on a strike on a family home.

=== 7 February ===
20 people were reported killed and 20 injured in an airstrike on a home.

=== 13 February ===
At least seven were killed in Israeli drone strikes on 13 February while trying to access internet.

=== 15 February ===
Two people were killed and multiple people injured in an airstrike on two family homes.

=== 22 February ===
The IDF bombed an UNRWA building sheltering displaced people, with a survivor stating, "An Israeli reconnaissance plane bombed the car, and we found martyrs and wounded in the street".

== March strikes ==
=== 5 March ===
An airstrike on a residential block killed at least eight people.

=== 19 March ===
At least eight people, including children, were killed by Israeli shelling.

=== 26 March ===
Al Jazeera reported that Israel had bombed a house, killing and wounding those inside.

== April strikes ==
=== 16 April ===
One person was killed and eleven wounded after an Israeli warplane reportedly bombed a mosque in the Jabalia refugee camp.

== May strikes ==
=== 12 May ===
On 12 May 2024, Israeli forces reportedly attacked the refugee camp again. Footage allegedly showed Israel dropping bombs on the camp, and using tanks to enter it.

=== 16 May ===
There was a "clear surge" in bombings on the camp, including drone strikes on a kindergarten and on medics. A resident stated, "Tanks and planes are wiping out residential districts and markets, shops, restaurants, everything. It is all happening before the one-eyed world". The Gaza civil defense stated they collected 93 bodies from Jabalia's streets and alleys.

=== 18 May ===
Artillery, drone strikes and missile attacks reportedly killed five people.

=== 19 May ===
Al Jazeera reported Israeli warplanes had bombed the al-Qasaib neighborhood, with an unknown number of casualties.

=== 21 May ===
A camp resident described recent Israeli bombardments, stating, "We came out running and found dismembered [sic] heads on the streets".

=== 26 May ===
Verified video from the aftermath of an airstrike showed people digging through rubble looking for survivors.

=== 31 May ===
On 31 May 2024, the IDF withdrew from Jabalia after over two weeks of intense fighting and more than 200 airstrikes. Palestinian officials said that 70% of the refugee camp was destroyed. The Israeli military said that it had destroyed over 10 kilometers of underground tunnels that it says the militants used. The Israeli military also said that it had destroyed a number of weapons production sites and rocket launchers. During the weeks-long operation, troops recovered the bodies of seven Israeli hostages.

== July strikes ==
=== 4 July ===
Five people, including three children, were killed by Israeli airstrikes.

=== 8 July ===
Ten people, including children, were killed by an Israeli airstrike on a home.

== August strikes ==
=== 16 August ===
At least seven people were killed by Israeli airstrikes on residential buildings in Jabalia.

=== 27 August ===
Israeli forces fired a missile at a street vendor's stand, killing three people and injuring several others.

== September strikes ==
=== 8 September ===
Four Palestinians were killed by an Israeli airstrike in the Al-Alami area of the camp.

== October strikes ==
=== 6 October ===
At least 17 people were killed by Israeli bombardment, including nine children.

=== 12 October ===
At least 29 Palestinians were killed by Israeli airstrikes.

=== 18 October ===
An Israeli airstrike killed 33 Palestinians, including 21 women and children, and injured 85 others after it targeted the Indonesia Hospital nearby the camp. One of the victims who was killed was Palestinian freelance artist and digital illustrator, Mahasen al-Khateeb.

=== 22 October ===
At least eight Palestinian civilians were killed by an Israeli airstrike on the camp.

=== 27 October ===
At least 20 civilians, including women and children, were killed and several others were injured by Israeli airstrikes.

== November strikes ==
=== 7 November ===
27 Palestinians were killed and several others were injured after Israeli forces targeted a house near Abu Hussein School in the camp.

=== 9 November ===
Five Palestinians were killed by an Israeli airstrike on a home in the camp.

=== 30 November ===
More than 40 Palestinians were killed by an Israeli airstrike in the Tel al-Zaatar neighborhood of the camp.

== December strikes ==
=== 9 December ===
According to Al Jazeera, three people in the camp were killed by an Israeli drone.

== January 2025 strikes ==
=== 1 January ===
On 1 January 2025, 17 Palestinians, including children, were killed and 20 others were injured by an Israeli airstrike.

== April strikes ==
=== 2 April ===
19 Palestinians, including nine children, were killed in an Israel airstrike on a UN clinic.

=== 17 April ===
At least six people when an Israeli airstrike targeted a UN-run school that was sheltering displace Palestinians in the camp.

== May strikes ==
=== 12 May ===
On that day, at least 16 Palestinians, including five children were killed in an Israeli airstrike when Israeli forces targeted the Fatima Bint Assad School in the camp.

=== 14 May ===
At least 50 people were killed by Israeli attacks in Jabalia, including in the Jabalia camp.

=== 15 May ===
According to Wafa, at least 15 Palestinian civilians, including 11 children and a woman, were killed when Israeli forces targeted a prayer hall and a medical clinic in the camp.

=== 30 May ===
Two Palestinians were killed in an Israeli airstrike.

== June strikes ==
=== 2 June ===
An Israeli airstrike targeted a residential building in the refugee camp, killing 14 people, including five women and seven children.

=== 12 June ===
Wafa reported that two Palestinians were killed by Israeli shelling in the Bir al-Na'ja, west of the refugee camp.

== 2026 strikes ==
=== 15 February ===
Several tents in the camp were targeted by Israeli forces, killing at least five Palestinians, despite the ceasefire.

=== 3 May ===
A Palestinian man was killed by Israeli forces in the al-Hoja Street area of the camp.

=== 14 July ===
A police station in the camp was attacked by an Israeli drone, killing at least eight Palestinians, including six police officers. Gaza's Interior Ministry condemned the attack as a "horrific massacre against officers and members of the police force".

== Siege of Jabalia Camp ==
On 6 October 2024, Israel began a military operation on the Jabaliya camp, killing more than 150 people in the first week. On 9 October, one airstrike killed at least nine people, including two children. Despite Israeli assurances that civilians could evacuate, one resident of Jabalia stated, "It’s like hell. We can’t get out."

== Reactions ==
In May 2024, residents of Jabalia who returned to the camp described the destruction as "horrifying". One resident stated, "The devastation is colossal. The destruction is massive, beyond description. No words can describe the scale of the damage. The entire area is unlivable".

=== 31 October attack ===
Norwegian doctor and pro-Palestinian activist Mads Gilbert stated, "There is absolutely no doubt that this is a mass murder." Melanie Ward, the chief executive of the UK-nonprofit Medical Aid for Palestinians, stated, "This attack marks a new low and should serve as a wake-up call to world leaders and politicians everywhere. Their meek requests for compliance with international law are being ignored entirely; Israel has instead increased the ferocity of its indiscriminate and disproportionate attacks." Doctors Without Borders condemned the airstrike, stating "Enough is enough!"

The attack was immediately condemned by the Egyptian, Saudi, Jordanian, and Qatari foreign ministries. Bolivia severed diplomatic relations with Israel, and Colombia and Chile recalled their ambassadors. UN Special Rapporteurs stated the attacks were a "brazen violation of international law – and a war crime."

== See also ==
- Al-Shati refugee camp airstrikes
- Attacks on schools during the Israeli invasion of Gaza
- Outline of the Gaza war
- List of massacres in the Palestinian territories
- Israeli war crimes in the Gaza war

Similar international events

- Dedebit Elementary School airstrike, a 2022 Ethiopian airstrike launched at a school-turned-internally displaced persons camp
- Hass refugee camp bombing, a 2019 Russian airstrike in Syria
- 2023 Laiza massacre, caused by an airstrike launched at an IDP camp
