= North Gaza Governorate =

Governorate of Palestine

Coordinates: 31°33′N 34°30′E

North Gaza Governorate محافظة شمال غزة
- Governorate
- Interactive map of North Gaza Governorate
- Country: Palestine
- Territory: Gaza Strip

Area
  - Total: 61 km^{2} (24 sq mi)

Population (2017)
  - Total: 270,245
  - Density: 4,400/km^{2} (11,000/sq mi)

The North Gaza Governorate (Arabic: محافظة شمال غزة) is a governorate of Palestine in the Gaza Strip. According to the Palestinian Central Bureau of Statistics, the governorate had a population of 270,245 (7.2% of the Palestinian population) with 40,262 households in mid-year 2007 encompassing three municipalities, two rural districts and one refugee camp.

North Gaza has seen numerous strikes during the Gaza war, including attacks on the Shadia Abu Ghazala School and Beit Lahia.

== Localities ==
- Al-Qaraya al-Badawiya
- Beit Hanoun (Beit Hanun)
- Beit Lahia (Beit Lahiya)
- Izbat Beit Hanoun
- Jabalia (Jabalya)
- Jabalia camp
