= Timeline of the Gaza war (24 November 2023 – 11 January 2024) =

- Initial attacks; (7–27 October 2023); Invasion of the Gaza Strip; (28 October 2023 – 23 November 2023); First ceasefire; (24 November 2023 – 11 January 2024); Yemen airstrikes; (12 January 2024 – 6 May 2024); Rafah offensive; (7 May 2024 – 12 July 2024); Al-Mawasi attack; (13 July 2024 – 26 September 2024); Attack on Hezbollah headquarters; (27 September 2024 – 16 October 2024); Killing of Yahya Sinwar; (17 October 2024 – 26 November 2024); Israel–Lebanon ceasefire agreement; (27 November 2024 – 18 January 2025); Israel–Hamas ceasefire agreement; (19 January 2025 – 17 March 2025); March 2025 Israeli attacks on the Gaza Strip; (18 March 2025 – 15 May 2025); May 2025 Gaza offensive; (16 May 2025 – 19 August 2025); August 2025 Gaza offensive; (20 August 2025 – 2 October 2025); October 2025 Israel–Hamas ceasefire agreement; (3 October 2025 – present)

== November 2023 ==
=== 24 November ===
- 7:00 a.m. IST (05:00 +2 UTC): The 2023 Gaza war ceasefire came into effect on the 49th day of the war.
- 7:20: Aid lorries began entering Gaza through the Rafah Border Crossing.
- Qatari mediators established an operations room with direct connections to Israel, the Hamas political office in Doha, the Hamas office within the International Committee of the Red Cross (ICRC), and Qatari Foreign Ministry spokesperson Dr. Majed al-Ansari.
- AP reported that two Palestinians were fatally shot and eleven were wounded by Israeli soldiers as they attempted to move back to northern Gaza.
- 7:19 p.m. IST: 24 hostages, including 13 Israelis, 10 Thais, and one Filipino, were released by Hamas. Israel also released 39 Palestinian prisoners.
- The Malta-flagged French-owned CMA CGM container ship Symi, owned by Singapore-based Eastern Pacific Shipping, which is controlled by Israeli billionaire Idan Ofer was attacked and damaged by a suspected Iranian drone in the Indian Ocean.
- Hospitals in northern Gaza, including al-Ahli Arab Hospital, were evacuated by the World Health Organization and the Red Cross.

=== 25 November ===
- Two men accused of being spies for Israel were killed in Tulkarm by the Tulkarm Battalion; their bodies were first hung from a utility pole and then dumped in a trash bin.
- Hamas released 13 Israeli hostages and four Thai nationals after a delay of seven hours due to accusations that Israel was violating the terms of the truce. Israel released 39 Palestinian prisoners in return.
- TRT reported that tree Palestinians, waiting for the release of their relatives near Ofer Prison west of Ramallah, were injured as a result of Israeli security forces fire.
- Suspected Houthi fighters seized an Israeli-owned, Malta-flagged freighter transiting the Red Sea.
- The PIJ claimed one attack on Israeli forces at Jenin.
- The director general of the Ministry of Health stated the Israeli military shot at medical teams during the temporary ceasefire in effect.
- UNOCHA stated only four small hospitals in northern Gaza and eight health facilities in southern Gaza were still functioning.

=== 26 November ===
- Al Jazeera reported that six Palestinians were killed in Israeli operations in the West Bank.
- In the first two-day extension of the truce 17 hostages, including 14 Israels and three Thai nationals, were released by Hamas. 39 teenage Palestinian prisoners were also released by Israel.
- The IDF intercepted a drone over the Red Sea.
- Netanyahu visited Israeli soldiers and commanders in the Gaza Strip.

=== 27 November ===
- Qatari officials stated that Israel and Hamas had agreed to extend the truce by two days.
- Hamas released 11 Israeli hostages while Israel released 33 Palestinian prisoners.
- Palestinian militias detonated IEDs and clashed with Israeli forces in Jenin, and Palestinian fighters attacked Israeli forces with small arms fire and IEDs during a raid in the Askar Camp.

=== 28 November ===
- 10 Israeli hostages and a pet dog, two Thais, and 30 Palestinian prisoners were exchanged on the fourth day of the truce. This was the fifth such exchange.
- The Iraqi militant group Ashab al Kahf threatened to conduct further attacks targeting US forces in the Middle East in the coming months.
- Palestinian fighters in Gaza remotely detonated two IEDs targeting IDF soldiers boarding armored vehicles near Al-Rantisi Hospital, while Hamas militants clashed with Israeli forces in Tubas and said it prevented them from arresting one of its fighters.

=== 29 November ===
- The IDF announced that Israeli troops killed three Palestinian gunmen in the Gaza Strip who had violated the ceasefire and posed a threat to Israeli forces.
- Four people, including two juveniles, were reportedly shot and killed by Israeli soldiers during an incursion into Jenin. In response, the al-Aqsa Martyrs' Brigades, al Quds Brigades and unspecified Palestinian fighters conducted small arms clashes and IED attacks against Israeli forces.
- Hamas informed mediators that it was willing to extend the truce by four days. An Israeli official also told The Washington Post that they were willing to extend the truce for "another two to three days".
- The heads of the Mossad, the CIA, and the Egyptian intelligence service held talks in Qatar.
- Hamas released 16 hostages, and Israel released 30 Palestinian prisoners in return. The PIJ also claimed that they handed over a number of hostages to Israel.
- Hamas said three Israeli hostages died due to Israeli airstrikes in the Gaza Strip.
- West Bank residents participated in two anti-Israel demonstrations in Hebron and Nablus.
- A US destroyer shot down a Houthi drone in the Red Sea, whist an Iranian drone conducted "unsafe and unprofessional actions" near the USS Dwight D. Eisenhower in the Persian Gulf.

=== 30 November ===
- Two gunmen in a mass shooting killed three people and injured 16 others at a bus stop in West Jerusalem. The perpetrators, who were brothers from Sur Baher, East Jerusalem, were killed by off-duty police officers. Hamas claimed responsibility.
- The IDF and Hamas confirmed that the truce was extended for a seventh day.
- Two Israeli soldiers suffered minor injuries after a car-ramming attack at a checkpoint near Beka'ot. The driver was killed.
- Hamas released eight hostages. Israel also released 30 Palestinian prisoners.
- A Saudi news outlet reported that a Houthi-controlled arms depot in Sanaa was attacked by an Israeli airstrike. Houthi officials denied the report, claiming that a gas station was hit instead.
- The IDF intercepted a "suspicious" object near the Gaza Strip; no group claimed responsibility for the attack.
- The al-Aqsa Martyrs' Brigades conducted four attacks targeting Israeli forces in Qalqilya, Tubas and Tulkarm.
- WHO chief Tedros Adhanom Ghebreyesus stated the health needs of Gaza had increased dramatically, though only one-third of its health facilities were functioning.
- The Health Ministry stated hundreds needed to be evacuated from Gaza to receive medical care.

== December 2023 ==
=== 1 December ===
- The seven day ceasefire having formally ended at 07:00 IST (UTC+02:00] the IDF resumed combat operations at the same intensity as before while talks in Qatar continued.
- Leaflets were dropped with maps into Khan Yunis depicting hundreds of evacuation zones.
- An Israeli airstrike destroyed a large building in Khan Yunis. The Gaza Health Ministry claimed that over 180 people were killed since the truce ended.
- Five Israeli soldiers were wounded in a mortar attack near Nirim.
- Hamas claimed that it had fired a barrage of missiles towards Tel Aviv. Several people were injured, though the IDF made no comment regarding property damage. The PIJ also claimed that it had fired rockets at West Jerusalem and other Israeli cities.
- The Al-Aqsa Martyrs' Brigades claimed an IED attack targeting an unspecified vehicle in the northern part of the West Bank as well as a small arms attack on an IDF patrol near Nablus.
- Doctors Without Borders stated al-Awda hospital had been damaged in an Israeli bombing.
- Hospitals reported overcrowding, with doctors forced to treat patients on the floor.

=== 2 December ===
- The Mossad withdrew from negotiations in Qatar, with director David Barnea citing Hamas' failure to release all of its listed female and child hostages.
- French President Emmanuel Macron announced that he would proceed directly from the 2023 United Nations Climate Change Conference held in Dubai, United Arab Emirates to Doha for the truce talks.
- The IDF said that they killed Wissam Farhat, the commander of Hamas's Shejaiya battalion, in an airstrike.
- The IDF conducted an operation in Jabalia, where they killed Hamas fighters and destroyed its infrastructure, including tunnels and subterranean structures.
- Palestinian militants conducted 25 rocket and mortar attacks on Israel.
- The IDF clashed with Palestinian fighters across five towns in the West Bank.
- The al-Qassam Brigades claimed that it targeted an Israeli command and control position east of Beit Hanoun. The group also fired a rocket propelled grenade targeting an Israeli bulldozer near Juhor ad-Dik.

=== 3 December ===
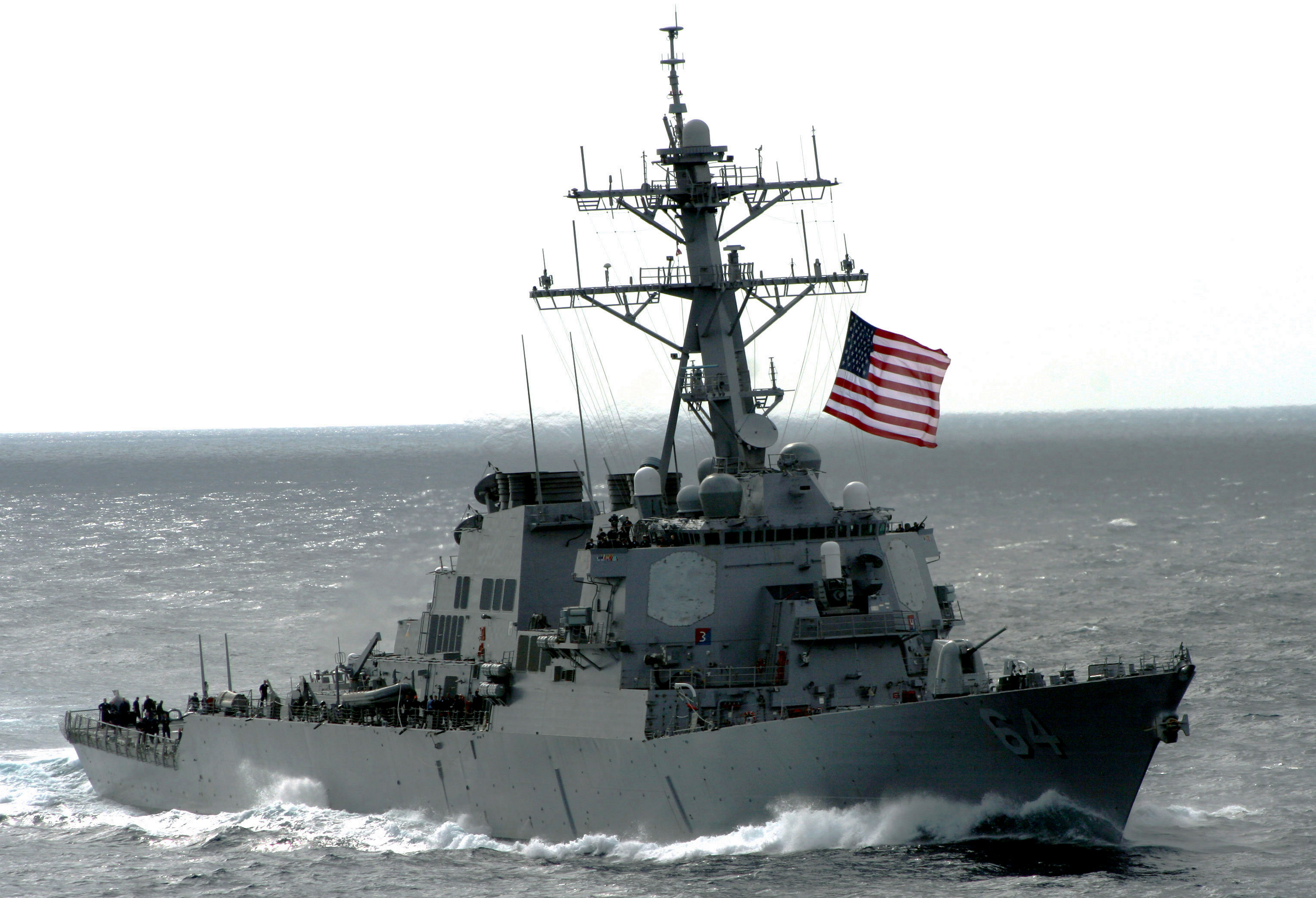
The guided missile destroyer USS Carney (DDG 64) in 2006

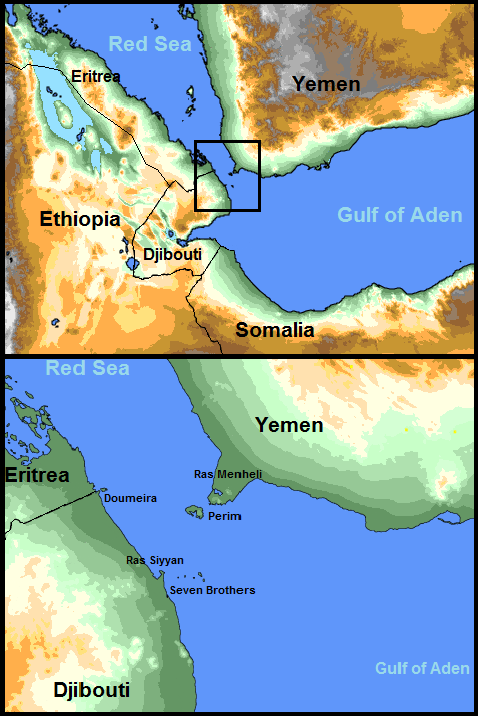
The main passage of Bab-el-Mandeb Strait is 26 km (16 mi) wide

- A spokesperson for the Gaza Health Ministry said that in an IDF strike in the Jabalia refugee camp, killed and wounded dozens of people.
- The USS Carney shot down two Houthi drones heading towards its direction whilst responding to a distress call from a civilian commercial ship that was attacked by a ballistic missile. Two vessels reportedly linked to Israel were attacked, namely the Unity Explorer and Number Nine; the Houthi had ordered one to alter course. A third cargo vessel, Sophie II, also came under attack.
- Shin Bet director Ronen Bar announced that the Israeli cabinet had set the goal of the elimination of Hamas, referring to the 7 October attacks as "our Munich".
- The IDF announced that it expanded its ground operations into all of Gaza.
- The Iranian military conducted a threatening drone flight near the USS Dwight D. Eisenhower.
- The Al-Qassem Brigades launched a rocket salvo at Tel Aviv, the PFLP fired rockets into southern Israel, and the Al-Aqsa Martyrs' Brigades claimed three attacks in the West Bank.
- Israeli forces arrested 34 people, including eight Hamas-affiliated individuals, in overnight raids of West Bank towns.
- Al Jazzera reported that an IDF strike hit the Kamal Adwan hospital, killing at least four people.

=== 4 December ===
- A senior IDF official said that Israel had killed over 5,000 militants throughout the war.
- Iranian officials warned that Israeli attacks on Iranian interests in Syria "will not go unanswered".
- The militant wings of the DFLP and the Al-Qassam Brigades fired rockets into southern Israel and Tel Aviv from Gaza.
- The Al-Aqsa Martyrs' Brigades engaged Israeli forces in a small arms clash in the Qalandia refugee camp.
- Palestinian fighters engaged Israeli forces in a small arms clash and detonated an IED targeting Israeli forces in Jenin, whist the PFLP said that it would escalate attacks in response to Israeli forces killing Palestinian fighters in Qalqilya.
- The IDF demolished the Palace of Justice located in south Gaza City, a significant structure that housed the Palestinian Supreme Court, the Court of Appeal, the Court of First Instance, and the Magistrate.
- The entire Gaza Strip experienced a near-total internet blackout.
- Iranian state media outlets al-Alam and IRIB News said that a new Palestinian militia group called the Biddya Brigades had "taken control" over Biddya in the northern West Bank.

=== 5 December ===
- The New York Times reported that the IDF had begun its invasion of southern Gaza. The IDF reported that its soldiers had reached the centers of both Khan Yunis and Jabalia. Head of the Southern Command General Yaron Finkelman said that troops were involved in the heaviest fighting since the start of the ground invasion.
- An Israeli airstrike hit the Ma'an School in Khan Yunis near the Nasser Medical Complex, which was being used by UNRWA as a shelter. At least 25 people were killed in the attack, with multiple injuries reported.
- Doctors at the Al-Aqsa Hospital stated they could not handle the overflow of patients they were experiencing.

=== 6 December ===
- Israel's Arrow defense system intercepted a missile launched from Yemen. Sirens were set off in Eilat, although the missile did not enter Israeli airspace.
- The USS Carney shot down a drone from Houthi-controlled territory in Yemen over the southern Red Sea.
- Israeli officials said that the IDF had killed half of Hamas's mid-level commanders in Gaza.
- Palestinian militias launched seven rocket attacks into southern Israel.
- Israeli defence minister Yoav Gallant met with mayors and local council heads in Nahariya to discuss the threat of Hezbollah to northern residents. Gallant said that if diplomacy fails, Israel will use its military to force Hezbollah north of the Litani River.
- Doctors Without Borders stated fuel and medical supplies at al-Aqsa hospital were critically low.

=== 7 December ===
- Poet and activist Refaat Alareer was killed by an Israeli airstrike along with his family.
- Egypt warned the United States and Israel to not allow a situation that would push displaced Palestinians to flee into the Sinai Peninsula, saying that it could cause a "rupture" in Egypt–Israel relations.
- The National Resistance Brigades launched a rocket attack into southern Israel.
- Palestinian fighters attacked Israeli forces during Israeli raids in Jenin and Ramallah.
- West Bank residents held an anti-Israel demonstration in Nablus.
- The al-Aqsa Martyrs' Brigades attacked Israeli forces six times in Tulkarm and Nablus.
- An unspecified Iranian-backed militia fired two rockets into Israel from Syria.
- Al Jazeera reported that an Israeli strike hit and destroyed the Great Omari Mosque of Gaza.

=== 8 December ===
- The IDF said it had discovered a Hamas tunnel measuring nearly a kilometer leading from Al-Azhar University to a school nearby.
- Under-Secretary-General for Humanitarian Affairs Martin Griffiths ascertained that the UN aid programme to Gaza was "no longer a functioning one", and UNRWA Gaza director Thomas White said that civic order was breaking down, with aid convoys being looted and UN vehicles stoned. Furthermore, the commissioner-general of the UNRWA, Philippe Lazzarini, said that 133 of its workers had been killed, and 85% of the population, equivalent to 1.9 million people, had been displaced, some of them multiple times.
- The United States vetoed a UN Security Council resolution calling for an immediate ceasefire in Gaza. Only the UK abstained while the remaining thirteen members voted in the affirmative.
- Israeli forces raided a Hamas Deir al Balah Battalion position in Gaza.
- The Al-Qassam Brigades launched three rocket attacks at Tel Aviv, while the Al-Quds Brigades launched four more towards southern Israel.
- At least six Hamas fighters died in clashes with Israeli forces near Tubas and Israeli forces clashed with Palestinian fighters in two locations in Qalqilya.
- Palestinian militias called for an escalation in attacks and demonstrations in the West Bank.

=== 9 December ===
- Houthi military spokesperson Brigadier General Yahya Saree warned shipping companies against cooperating with Israel, saying that all Israel-bound ships in the Red Sea would become a target, regardless of nationality.
- Israeli national security adviser Tzahi Hanegbi warned that the country could no longer accept Hezbollah on its border, and said they would have to "act" if the group continued to pose a threat.
- The US State Department approved the emergency sale of 14,000 rounds of tank ammunition to Israel.
- Netanyahu reportedly told President Biden that Israel would act militarily against the Houthi movement if the US failed to do so.
- The al-Aqsa Martyrs' Brigades and the DFLP militant wing fired rockets into Southern Israel from Gaza.
- A French frigate shot down two drones reportedly fired from the coast of Yemen over the Red Sea.
- The WHO stated two health staff had been shot and killed by the IDF at Al Awda Hospital, besieged since 5 December.
- The director of the European Hospital said several of its paramedics were wounded in Israeli airstrikes.

=== 10 December ===
- Hamas warned Israel that no hostage would leave Gaza alive without "an exchange and negotiation".
- The PFLP said that attacking US and Israeli forces in the region in order to remove them must remain a goal.
- Al-Quds Brigades snipers fired at two Israeli soldiers near Zeitoun.
- The Ministry of Health stated 50,000 people had been wounded since the start of the conflict.
- Doctors Without Borders stated that the Israeli army had forced them to evacuate the Martyrs and Beni Shueila clinics, and that healthcare had completely collapsed.

=== 11 December ===
- Hamas fired a rocket barrage towards central Israel, injuring one person in Holon.
- Hamas and other Palestinian militant groups called for a global strike, particularly in the West Bank.
- Israeli soldiers uncovered an RPG training facility inside a mosque in Jabalia, finding various other weapons, grenades, and cartridges.
- Israeli soldiers thwarted a Hamas attempt to ambush their position and destroyed a tunnel shaft.
- Palestinians staged a general strike in the West Bank.
- Israeli soldiers used smoke bombs on residents in Jabalia refugee camp.
- The Al-Qassam brigades launched two rockets into Tel Aviv in response to attacks in Gaza and the DFLP fired mortars at an IDF site in southern Israel.
- MSF stated one of its doctors inside Al Awda Hospital had been injured by an Israeli sniper.
- The director of Kamal Adwan Hospital stated Israel had killed two mothers and their newborn babies when an Israeli strike hit its maternity ward. The UN confirmed the killings.
- An Israeli airstrike killed 80+ (102 according to an Airwars investigation) members of the Salem family.

=== 12 December ===
- Israeli forces stormed Kamal Adwan Hospital after shelling it for several days. Dozens of medical staff were arrested, including the hospital's director.
- It was announced that the night before, Houthi fighters carried out a rocket attack against the Norwegian-owned and -flagged commercial tanker MT Strinda, claiming that it was delivering crude oil to an Israeli terminal; Mowinckel Chemical Tankers, its owner, stated that it was heading to Italy with palm oil, and that its Indian crew was uninjured.
- The IDF said that over a tenth of its soldiers killed in Gaza died as a result of friendly fire, and that several other deaths were also accidental.
- Six Palestinians were killed by an Israeli drone during a raid in Jenin.
- Israel informed the US it began to "carefully test out" flooding Hamas' tunnels in Gaza with seawater.
- The United Nations General Assembly voted to demand an immediate ceasefire in Gaza. 153 nations voted in favor of it, while 10 voted against and 23 abstained.
- Soldiers of the IDF's 13th battalion were attacked by three IEDs planted by Hamas while carrying out searches to clear buildings in the suburbs of Gaza City. Seven soldiers and two senior commanders were killed.
- Israel raided the Kamal Adwan Hospital.
- In response, Tedros Adhanom Ghebreyesus stated WHO was extremely worried for Kamal Adwan's medical staff.
- Doctors at Nasser Medical Complex in Khan Younis described a lack of supplies and barely any medical functionality.

=== 13 December ===
- The destroyer USS Mason responded to a distress call from the Ardmore Encounter, which was under a Houthi drone attack.
- In an interview with SkyNews, Israeli ambassador to the UK Tzipi Hotovely said she "absolutely" rejected the two-state solution.
- The commander of the 13th Battalion of the IDF's Golani Brigade, Tomer Grinberg, was killed in battle along with several soldiers in Shuja'iyya.
- 240 people were trapped at al-Awda, surrounded by Israeli snipers, without clean water and surviving on one meal per day of bread or rice.

=== 14 December ===
- Three ships, namely the Hong Kong-flagged Maersk Gibraltar, the Al Jasrah, and the MSC Palatiun III came under attack from Houthi missiles.
- Seven people, including four alleged members of Hamas, were arrested in Denmark, Germany, and the Netherlands for planning attacks on Jewish institutions across Europe.
- The Ministry of Health reported 2,500 internally displaced persons from Kamal Adwan had been forcibly evacuated, and that IDF soldiers had prevented medical staff from continuing support to 12 babies in intensive care and ten emergency department patients, leading to two deaths.

=== 15 December ===
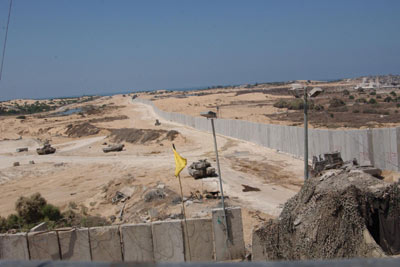
The Philadelphia Axis and its fortifications

- The IDF launched its first major attack on Rafah and the Philadelphi Route using aircraft and drones.
- At least 17 people died and dozens were injured when artillery fire struck Haifa School and a residential home.
- Israel approved the reopening of the Kerem Shalom border crossing for Gaza aid.
- The IDF issued a statement revealing that they had killed three of their own hostages in an act of friendly fire during operations in Shuja'iyya, saying that troops fired at and killed the three hostages after they mistook them "as a threat". The hostages were later identified after their bodies were returned to Israel. The hostages were waving a white flag when they were shot.
- Israel operated in the al-Shifa hospital. A journalist on the scene stated that Israel had hit the hospital's generators and communications unit, severing contact with the outside world.
- Rockets were fired from Gaza to Jerusalem and its surrounding towns. Fragments of the rockets were later found at a kindergarten and at a construction site.

=== 16 December ===
- The U.S. Navy shot down 14 Houthis drones in the Red Sea, and the British destroyer HMS Diamond one.
- The world's largest shipping group, Mediterranean Shipping Company (MSC) announced it would no longer send vessels through the Red Sea (following similar decisions by CMA CGM, Maersk, and Hapag-Lloyd) and reset its routes around the Cape of Good Hope.
- Iran reportedly executed a spy working for the Mossad in Sistan and Baluchestan province.
- An Israeli sniper shot and killed a Christian mother and daughter sheltering at the Holy Family Catholic Church in northern Gaza.
- The French foreign ministry announced that one of its workers died from injuries he sustained in an Israeli airstrike in Rafah that killed 11 people. It also condemned the attack.
- Journalists reported Israeli bulldozers had crushed dozens sheltering outside Kamal Adwan.

=== 17 December ===
- The council head of the town of Metula, David Azoulay, proposed in an interview with pop music station Radio 103FM sending all Gazans to refugee camps in Lebanon and flattening an uninhabited Gaza Strip so it would "resemble the Auschwitz concentration camp", serving as both a museum and buffer zone.
- The IDF announced the discovery of the largest Hamas tunnel to date, approximately 2.5 km long, 50 m deep in some areas, and large enough for vehicles.
- The Gaza Health Ministry said 90 Palestinians were killed in Israeli strikes in the Jabalia refugee camp.
- Israeli Chief of the General Staff Herzi Halevi announced that the IDF had taken 1,000 people captive in Gaza.
- Orient Overseas Container Line (OOCL) suspended all business with Israel "due to operational issues" after one of its ships came under Houthi attack in the Red Sea.
- The al-Qassam brigades and the Mujahideen Brigade, the military wing of the Palestinian Mujahideen Movement, claimed rocket attacks into southern Israel.
- Palestinians gathered at the Arab American University in Jenin to demonstrate in solidarity to the people of Gaza.
- A tank shell killed children when it hit the pediatric ward at the Nasser Medical Complex.

=== 18 December ===
- BP announced it would pause all shipments through the Red Sea. Evergreen Line also suspended operations.
- US Defence Secretary Lloyd Austin in Bahrain announced the formation of Operation Prosperity Guardian (the successor task force of Combined Task Force 153) comprising the US, UK, Canada, France, Italy, Netherlands, Norway, Seychelles, Bahrain, and Spain, to protect vessels in the Red Sea from Houthi attacks. Italy announced its participation soon thereafter. The Houthis announced that this would not stop them, vowing to continue attacks against Israeli and Israel-bound ships in the Red Sea.
- The IDF shelled a Syrian Army outpost in southern Syria in retaliation for an attack from the country towards the Golan Heights earlier that day.
- The al-Ahli Arab Hospital was attacked, with displaced people forced out and two doctors arrested.

=== 19 December ===
- An IDF warplane under the guidance of Shin Bet killed top Hamas financier Subhi Ferwana in Rafah.
- A rocket barrage was fired into central Israel.
- At least 13 Palestinians were killed and many others injured in an IDF air raid on the Jabalia refugee camp. 29 other Palestinians were killed and three buildings were destroyed in an Israeli airstrike on a residential area in Rafah.
- Dozens were reported killed in a bombing in the Rimal neighborhood, Gaza City.
- Itzik Cohen, the commander of the IDF's 162nd Division, claimed that his forces managed to "break the operational abilities" of Hamas' northern Gaza City brigade, and claimed his division had "operational control" in Jabalia.
- Israel informed Qatar that it was ready for a week-long truce in exchange for Hamas' release of 40 hostages.
- Doctors Without Borders reported Israeli troops seized Al-Awda Hospital, with troops stripping, bounding, and interrogating all men and boys over the age of sixteen.

=== 20 December ===
- Hamas leader Ismail Haniyeh visited Cairo to discuss the possibility of another truce with Egyptian officials. The Wall Street Journal reported that Hamas rejected Israel's proposal to temporarily stop fighting in exchange for hostages, asserting that the release of Israeli hostages would not be considered until a ceasefire was established. This was rejected by Israel the following day.
- Malaysia banned Israeli-flagged ships from entering the country and rescinded its permits for ZIM, Israel's largest shipping company.
- The IDF struck an area near the Kuwaiti Hospital in Rafah.
- The IDF said it uncovered a major Hamas command center in Gaza City.
- Houthi leader Abdel-Malek al-Houthi threatened to strike US warships if they targeted his forces.
- The Office of the United Nations High Commissioner for Human Rights said it received "disturbing" reports that Israeli troops "summarily killed" at least 11 unarmed Palestinians in Gaza.
- The Red Crescent reported emergency and rescue teams were unable to reach the wounded.
- The Kuwaiti Hospital was overcrowded by large numbers of wounded patients following an airstrike in Rafah.

=== 21 December ===
- The IDF announced that its 99th Division completed operations in southern Gaza City and began to expand its scope to the central parts of the Gaza Strip, and that the 39th Division had completed operations in Shuja'iyya.
- IDF spokesperson Daniel Hagari said that over 2,000 Hamas operatives were killed in strikes and ground combat since the end of the truce on 1 December.
- A UN report said that over 500,000 people, a quarter of Gaza's population, were starving. Arif Husain, the chief economist of the World Food Programme, said, "It doesn't get any worse," and that he had not seen something "at the scale that is happening in Gaza".
- Hamas released a video showing three Israeli captives it said were killed by the IDF.
- The al Aqsa Martyrs' Brigades claimed an IED attack targeting the IDF in Al Marj and Qalqilya. Unspecified Palestinian fighters threw homemade explosives at the gates of Beitar Illit, an illegal Israeli settlement west of Bethlehem.
- Israeli military bulldozers destroyed the Sheikh Shaban cemetery in the as-Saha neighbourhood of eastern Gaza, crushing the bodies buried there.
- The Islamic Resistance in Iraq claimed responsibility for a drone attack on Eilat which was intercepted by the Royal Jordanian Air Force, as well as another drone attack on the Karish rig which was intercepted by IDF fighter jets.
- The Red Crescent reported the IDF had raided its ambulance centre.
- A nurse was reportedly killed by a sniper at al-Awda hospital.
- The director general of the Gaza Health Ministry Dr.Munir al-Bursh was wounded in an airstrike on a building.

=== 22 December ===
- Israeli police blocked Palestinians from entering the Al-Aqsa mosque for Friday prayers.
- An Israeli airstrike on a building in Gaza City killed 76 members of an extended family, including UN Development Program veteran Issam al-Mughrabi.
- Palestinians in Ramallah demonstrated in support of militias fighting in the Gaza Strip.
- Intense shelling was reported near al-Amal Hospital in Khan Yunis.
- The Palestinian Red Crescent stated Israel had destroyed all ambulances at its centre, and that 47 men were stripped naked, beaten, and tortured.

=== 23 December ===
- A Houthi drone hit the Gabon-flagged, mostly Indian-crewed Israeli-affiliated ship MV Saibaba off the west coast of India, inflicting water and fire damage but no injuries. The Indian Navy offered assistance, and later deployed several destroyers for deterrence. Almost simultaneously, the Liberian-flagged, Japanese-owned and Dutch-operated chemical tanker MV Chem Pluto was attacked from Iran at a distance of 370 kilometres (200 NM) off the west coast of India, southwest of Veraval.
- The IDF's Yiftach Brigade carried out an ambush against Hamas in southern Gaza City, killing dozens of fighters. In the same area, snipers of the same brigade killed several Hamas fighters preparing to attack Israeli troops.
- The Gaza Health Ministry reported a massacre at the Jabalia refugee camp, with dozens of civilians "executed" in the streets.
- Protests were held in Caesarea against Netanyahu.
- Israel announced the deaths of five IDF soldiers in the fighting in Gaza, bringing the overall death toll to 144.
- The Gaza government media office stated 137 civilians had been executed by the IDF in Gaza City.
- The USS Laboon shot down four drones launched from Houthi-controlled territory in Yemen which targeted the destroyer.
- Intense shelling was reported near al-Amal Hospital in Khan Yunis.
- The Palestinian Red Crescent stated Israel had destroyed all ambulance vehicles at its besieged centre, and that 47 men were stripped naked, beaten, and tortured.
- The Palestinian Red Crescent stated the Israeli army was detaining eight emergency rescue teams.
- The head of pediatrics at Kamal Adwan Hospital reported the conditions of the IDF siege, stating, "The soldiers dug up the graves this morning and dragged the bodies with bulldozers, then crushed the bodies with the bulldozers. I have never seen such a thing before."

=== 24 December ===
- Israel announced the deaths of ten soldiers, stating that a total of 15 soldiers had been killed since 23 December, bringing the IDF's death toll in their ground operation to 154. It also claimed to have killed Hamas' chief of supplies.
- The Gaza Health Ministry said at least 70 people were killed in Israeli attacks on the Al-Maghazi refugee camp. Another airstrike in Khan Yunis killed 23 people.
- Netanyahu said that Israel was paying a "very heavy price" for its invasion of Gaza.
- Maersk announced that with the establishment of Operation Prosperity Guardian that it was resuming operations in the Suez Canal and the Red Sea "as soon as operationally possible".
- The director of the Nasser Medical Complex reported doctors were treating wounds caused by internationally prohibited weapons.

=== 25 December ===
- Israel announced the deaths of two IDF soldiers in Gaza, bringing the ground operation death toll to 156.
- An Israeli airstrike outside of Damascus killed Sayyed Razi Mousavi, a top commander and senior adviser of the Iranian Revolutionary Guards Corps (IRGC).
- The Gaza Health Ministry reported that at least 250 Palestinians had been killed in Israeli attacks in the past 24 hours, bringing the total death toll to 20,674.
- Families of hostages heckled Netanyahu in the Knesset.
- The Government Media Office stated that 23 hospitals were out of service, that the health system was in the "final stage" of collapse, and that 9,000 people had died due to a lack of medical services.
- The Gaza Health Ministry reported 800,000 people in northern Gaza had no access to healthcare.

=== 26 December ===
- Israel announced that five of its soldiers, including two from the 179th Reserve Armored Brigade were killed and four others were injured, bringing the IDF's death toll in the Gaza invasion to 161.
- The Gaza Health Ministry announced that 241 Palestinians had been killed by Israeli attacks in the past 24 hours, bringing the total death toll to 20,915.
- The Indian Navy announced that it was deploying three guided missile destroyers; namely the INS Mormugao, INS Kochi, and INS Kolkata, to maintain a deterrent presence in the Arabian Sea in response to attacks on shipping near its coast.
- The Palestinian Red Crescent Society headquarters in Khan Yunis sustained serious damage after being hit by Israeli bombing, injuring several staff. It later lost contact with its emergency teams due to a communications blackout.
- The Red Crescent lost contact with its emergency teams due to a communications blackout.
- Tedros Adhanom Ghebreyesus stated the healthcare system was under "unbearable strain", and that patients at Al-Aqsa Hospital would die while waiting for treatment.

=== 27 December ===
- Israel announced that three soldiers of the Givati Brigade were killed in the fighting in Gaza, raising the IDF death toll to 164.
- The Gaza Health Ministry announced that 195 Palestinians had been killed by Israeli attacks in the past 24 hours, raising the total death toll to 21,110.
- The Gaza Health Ministry reported that at least 20 Palestinians were killed and others were wounded in an Israeli airstrike near the Al Amal hospital in Khan Yunis.
- During a visit to the Northern Command, IDF Chief of Staff Herzi Halevi said the army was at "a very high level of readiness" as Hezbollah attacks from Lebanon escalated.
- Israeli army attacks were reported in the vicinity of El-Amal City Hospital in Khan Yunis.

=== 28 December ===
- The IDF announced the deaths of three soldiers from its Armoured Corps, bringing its death toll in Gaza to 167.
- The Gaza Health Ministry reported that at least 50 Palestinians were killed in Israeli morning airstrikes on the areas of Beit Lahia, Khan Yunis and Al Maghazi.
- The Gaza Health Ministry announced that at least 210 Palestinians had been killed in Israeli attacks in the past 24 hours, raising the Gaza death toll to 21,320.
- The Euro-Mediterranean Human Rights Monitor released a report stating a total of 29,124 Palestinians had been killed by Israeli attacks on the Gaza Strip since 7 October. The number included 11,422 children and 5,822 women. They also stated that 56,122 Palestinians had been injured in the same period.
- The Gaza Health Ministry reported that in the evening at least 20 Palestinians were killed in an Israeli airstrike in Rafah.
- An Israeli airstrike on a civilian building in Bint Jbeil, Lebanon killed three Australians. One of the victims was claimed by Hezbollah to be one of its fighters.
- The Islamic Resistance In Iraq claimed responsibility for a drone attack near Eli-ad in the southern part of the Israeli-occupied Golan Heights.
- The director of operations of the Gaza Health Ministry stated 1.6 million people in Rafah were in need of medical care and that international intervention was needed.

=== 29 December ===
- At least 20 Palestinians were killed in an Israeli airstrike at dawn in the Nuseirat refugee camp.
- Israel announced that a soldier of the 551st Brigade was killed in fighting in the northern Gaza strip, bringing the IDF death toll in Gaza to 168.
- The Gaza Health Ministry reported that 187 Palestinians were killed in Israeli attacks in the past 24 hours, bringing the death toll to 21,507.
- Four people from West Azerbaijan province were executed by Iran and six others were arrested for allegedly spying for the Mossad.
- The US, without congressional review, approved an emergency $147.5 million weapons sale to Israel.
- South Africa filed a case South Africa v. Israel (Genocide Convention) at the International Court of Justice accusing Israel of "genocidal acts" in Gaza.
- The Gaza Government Media office stated that 800,000 residents in northern Gaza had no access to hospitals, and that 7,000 people remained buried beneath rubble.
- The UN called the health system in Gaza "shattered" and said patients were just "waiting to die".

=== 30 December ===
- The Gaza Health Ministry reported that 165 Palestinians were killed in Israeli attacks in the past 24 hours, bringing the death toll to 21,672.
- Israel announced the deaths of two soldiers, bringing the IDF's Gaza death toll to 170.
- 23 pro-Iranian militiamen were killed in Israeli airstrikes near the Syrian town of Abu Kamal, on the border with Iraq.
- In the evening, four Iran-backed non-Syrian militiamen were killed in Israeli airstrikes near the Al-Nairab military airport near Aleppo.
- Shortly before midnight, 12 Palestinians were killed in an Israeli airstrike in Az-Zawayda.
- Netanyahu said that Israel must take control of the border corridor between Egypt and the Gaza Strip to ensure the area's "demilitarization".
- The Abu Ali Mustafa Brigades announced a hostage was killed by an Israeli air raid.
- An airstrike near European Hospital in Khan Younis killed five people.

=== 31 December ===
- At least 10 Houthi militants were killed and two were injured when three of their ships were sunk by helicopters launched from US warships.
- Israeli airstrikes in central Gaza killed at least 35 people.
- Israel withdrew five brigades from the Gaza Strip.
- The Islamic Resistance in Iraq claimed two drone attacks in an unspecified location in the occupied Golan Heights which were both intercepted by Israeli fighter jets, as well as another drone attack on Eilat which was intercepted by the IDF.
- The Gaza Health Ministry reported that 150 Palestinians were killed in Israeli attacks in the past 24 hours, raising the death toll to 21,822.
- Israel announced that two soldiers had been killed in Gaza, bringing the IDF death toll there to 172.
- Former Palestinian minister and preacher at the Al-Aqsa Mosque, Yousuf Salama was killed and some of his family were injured by an Israeli airstrike in the Maghazi refugee camp.

== January 2024 ==
=== 1 January ===
- The Gaza Health Ministry announced that at least 156 Palestinians were killed in Israeli attacks in the past 24 hours, bringing its count of the death toll to 21,978.
- The IDF announced that it would partially withdraw troops in Gaza and shift toward more targeted operations against Hamas.
- Al Jazeera reported that 15 Palestinians were killed in the evening when an Israeli airstrike hit a building in Deir el-Balah.
- The IDF said that it killed Nukhba company commander Adil Mismah in an airstrike in Deir al-Balah.
- Iran deployed the warship Alborz to the Bab al-Mandeb Strait in response to the killing of 10 Houthi fighters by US forces the previous day.
- Turkey's Ministry of Health posted on X that it received 292 injured and sick from Gaza for treatment.

=== 2 January ===
- The Gaza Health Ministry reported that at least 207 Palestinians were killed by Israeli attacks in the past 24 hours, bringing its count of the death toll to 22,185.
- Al Jazeera reported that four Palestinians were shot dead by Israeli forces during a raid on Azzun in the West Bank.
- Turkish authorities detained 33 people on suspicion of spying for Israel.
- Al Jazeera and France24 reported that an Israeli airstrike that hit the headquarters of the Palestinian Red Crescent Society in Khan Yunis killed and wounded several people.
- Israel announced that a soldier of the Israeli Combat Engineering Corps was killed and two others were wounded in fighting in northern Gaza, bringing the IDF death toll to 174.
- Hamas deputy leader Saleh al-Arouri was killed along with six others in an Israeli drone strike in south Beirut.
- Al Jazeera reported that the al-Amal Hospital was attacked by Israeli forces.

=== 3 January ===
- Israel announced that a soldier of the elite Yahalom unit was killed in Gaza, bringing the IDF death toll there to 175.
- The Gaza Health Ministry announced at least 128 Palestinians were killed by Israeli attacks in the past 24 hours, bringing its count of the death toll to 22,313.
- A UN official condemned an Israeli attack on Khan Yunis which killed five people, including a newborn baby, who were sheltering at the Al Amal Hospital.
- The Palestine Red Crescent Society reported Israeli attacks near the al-Amal Hospital were intensifying.

=== 4 January ===
- Al Jazeera reported that at least 14 people were killed by an Israeli airstrike west of Khan Yunis.
- The Gaza Health Ministry announced that 125 Palestinians were killed in Israeli attacks in the past 24 hours, bringing its count of the death toll to 22,438.
- Al Jazeera reported that at least five Palestinians were killed in the evening by an Israeli airstrike in the Nuseirat camp.
- The Palestine Red Crescent Society stated Israel bombed the home of the Central Gaza Ambulance Center director. It also reported another attack on the al-Amal hospital that killed one person.

=== 5 January ===
- The Gaza Health Ministry reported that at least 162 Palestinians had been killed in Israeli attacks in the past 24 hours, bringing its count of the death toll to 22,600.
- Maersk again announced that it would avoid sending vessels through the Red Sea and Gulf of Aden "for the foreseeable future" due to Houthi attacks on its ships.
- The al-Qassem Brigades ambushed an IDF infantry squad in Bani Suheila, Khan Yunis and claimed to have killed and injured multiple soldiers.
- Al Jazeera reported that an Israeli shelling was near the al-Nasr Hospital.
- Doctors Without Borders set up a field hospital in Rafah, stating, "Staff are literally kneeling in blood on the floor to try to save the life of a person, even intubating on the floor."

=== 6 January ===
- Al Jazeera reported that 22 people were killed in an Israeli airstrike on a house in Khan Yunis during the early hours of the morning.
- The Gaza Health Ministry reported that at least 122 people were killed by Israeli attacks in the past 24 hours, raising its count of the death toll to 22,722.
- Israel announced that an officer of the Nahal Brigade was killed in northern Gaza, bringing the IDF death toll in Gaza to 176.
- The IDF said that it dismantled Hamas's command structure in northern Gaza, and said that militants were only operating in the area sporadically.
- The IDF and Shin Bet said that Ismail Siraj, the commander of Hamas's Nuseirat Battalion, and his deputy were killed by an airstrike.
- A displaced man was shot in the chest by an Israeli sniper in front of El Amal Hospital.

=== 7 January ===
- At least seven Palestinians were killed in a drone strike while an Israeli police officer was killed by a roadside bomb during an Israeli raid in Jenin.
- The Gaza civil defence announced that at least 8,000 people were missing in Gaza, assumed to be buried underneath the rubble of destroyed buildings.
- The Gaza Health Ministry reported that at least 113 Palestinians were killed in Israeli attacks in the past 24 hours, bringing its count of the death toll to 22,835.
- Israeli president Isaac Herzog said that Israel had no plans to expel Palestinians from Gaza.
- The Islamic Resistance In Iraq claimed responsibility for an attack on an Israeli base in the Golan Heights and a cruise missile attack on a 'vital target' on Haifa Bay.
- Gaza Media Office mentioned that there were 6,000 wounded people waiting to be approved to receive treatment in Egypt.
- The Gaza Health Ministry stated Israeli drones were shooting at "anything that moves", and were aiming to disable the hospital.

=== 8 January ===
- The Gaza health ministry reported that at least 249 Palestinians were killed in Israeli attacks in the past 24 hours, bringing its count of the death toll to 23,084.
- Al Jazeera reported that three Palestinians were shot dead by Israeli forces during a raid in Tulkarm.
- Al Jazeera reported that drones opened fire at people near Al-Aqsa Hospital.
- Doctors Without Borders reported their staff and families, including a five-year-old girl, had been injured by Israeli shelling at an MSF shelter.

=== 9 January ===
- Israel announced that nine of its soldiers were killed fighting in Gaza, bringing the IDF death toll there to 187.
- The Gaza Health Ministry reported that 126 Palestinians were killed in Israeli attacks in the past 24 hours, bringing its count of the death toll to 23,210.
- Just before midnight, at least 15 Palestinians were killed and dozens more were injured by an Israeli airstrike on an apartment building in Rafah.
- American and British naval vessels shot down 21 drones and missiles over the Red Sea during what was reported as the largest Houthi attack in the area.
- Saudi ambassador to the UK, Khalid bin Bandar Al Saud, said in an interview with the BBC that Saudi Arabia was interested in normalization with Israel after the conclusion of the war, but added that any deal must lead to the creation of a Palestinian state.

=== 10 January ===
- The Gaza Health Ministry reported that 147 Palestinians were killed in Israeli attacks in the past 24 hours, bringing its count of the death toll to 23,357.
- The IDF gained control of Khirbat Ikhza'a village after weeks of fighting.
- At least forty were killed in an Israel bombing near the entrance of Al-Aqsa hospital.
- The Palestinian Red Crescent reported an Israeli airstrike killed four paramedics and two patients in an ambulance.
- The Gaza Health Ministry stated it was investigating injuries caused by internationally banned weapons and warned 800,000 people in northern Gaza had been "sentenced to death" due to the collapse of the healthcare system.

=== 11 January ===
- The Gaza Health Ministry reported that 112 Palestinians were killed by Israeli attacks in the past 24 hours, bringing its count of the death toll to 23,469.
- Nine Palestinians were killed and others were wounded in an evening Israeli airstrike on a house in the Shawka neighbourhood in Rafah.
- South Africa presented a case to the International Court of Justice, accusing Israel of "genocide" in Gaza.
- Two US Navy SEALS went missing due to a mishap while searching for smuggled Iranian weapons for the Houthi movement in Yemen.
