= Timeline of the Gaza war (7 May 2024 – 12 July 2024) =

- Initial attacks; (7–27 October 2023); Invasion of the Gaza Strip; (28 October 2023 – 23 November 2023); First ceasefire; (24 November 2023 – 11 January 2024); Yemen airstrikes; (12 January 2024 – 6 May 2024); Rafah offensive; (7 May 2024 – 12 July 2024); Al-Mawasi attack; (13 July 2024 – 26 September 2024); Attack on Hezbollah headquarters; (27 September 2024 – 16 October 2024); Killing of Yahya Sinwar; (17 October 2024 – 26 November 2024); Israel–Lebanon ceasefire agreement; (27 November 2024 – 18 January 2025); Israel–Hamas ceasefire agreement; (19 January 2025 – 17 March 2025); March 2025 Israeli attacks on the Gaza Strip; (18 March 2025 – 15 May 2025); May 2025 Gaza offensive; (16 May 2025 – 19 August 2025); August 2025 Gaza offensive; (20 August 2025 – 2 October 2025); October 2025 Israel–Hamas ceasefire agreement; (3 October 2025 – present)

== May 2024 ==
=== 7 May ===
- The Gaza Health Ministry reported that at least 54 Palestinians were killed in Israeli attacks in the past 24 hours, bringing its count of the Palestinian death toll to 34,789.
- Israeli ground forces seized control of the Gaza side of the Rafah crossing, starting the Rafah offensive.
- Hamas announced the death of an Israeli captive from injuries they sustained from an Israeli air raid a month ago.
- Unspecified Palestinian militants detonated IEDs against IDF troops in Jalbun.

=== 8 May ===
- The Gaza Health Ministry reported that at least 55 Palestinians were killed in Israeli attacks in the past 24 hours, bringing its count of the Palestinian death toll to 34,844.
- The US paused its weapons delivery to Israel to limit its operations in Rafah.
- Israeli forces clashed with the members of the Qalqilya Battalion in the West Bank.

=== 9 May ===
- The Gaza Health Ministry reported that at least 60 Palestinians were killed in Israeli attacks in the past 24 hours, bringing its count of the Palestinian death toll to 34,904.
- Al Jazeera reported that an IAF strike hit a house in the al-Jnaina neighbourhood in Rafah, causing an unknown number of casualties.
- Syria claimed to have shot down Israeli missiles heading towards Damascus from the occupied Golan Heights.
- Israel announced that a soldier from the 869th Battalion was killed in Malkia by a Hezbollah mortar and missile attack.
- An Israeli police officer died of wounds he sustained during a raid in Deir al-Ghusun on 4 May.
- Four Hezbollah members were killed in an Israeli drone strike on a car in southern Lebanon.
- Al Jazeera reported that an IAF strike in the Tel al-Sultan neighborhood, west of Rafah, killed four people and injuring 16.
- Al Jazeera reported that Israeli forces shot a 15-year-old boy on the leg in Qalqilya.
- The Houthis claimed to have launched missiles at the Panamanian-Flagged MSC Diego and MSC Gina which they said were "affiliated with Israel".
- Al Jazeera reported that a seventh mass grave was uncovered near the Al-Shifa hospital.
- The Islamic resistance in Iraq claimed two drone attacks targeting Eilat and the Nevatim base in Beersheba, and a cruise missile attack targeting the oil port of Ashkelon.

=== 10 May ===
- The Gaza Health Ministry reported that at least 39 Palestinians were killed in Israeli attacks in the past 24 hours, bringing its count of the Palestinian death toll to 34,943.
- Al Jazeera reported that an Israeli air strike hit a home in Abasan al-Kabira at the eastern outskirts of Khan Yunis, killing eight residents living there.
- Al Jazeera reported that at least three people were killed and five more injured after an IAF strike hit a house in the central part of Gaza City.
- 12 Israeli soldiers of the Gaza Division were stung by wasps in southern Gaza and evacuated to Israel for treatment.
- Four soldiers of the Nahal Brigade were killed in the Zeitoun neighbourhood in Gaza, bringing the IDF death toll in the Gaza strip to 271.
- Hamas fired two barrages with at least 14 rockets from Rafah to Beer Sheva, injuring one person. Later the IDF said it has located and struck the two Hamas launch posts in Rafah, from which the rockets were fired.
- 35 rockets were fired from Lebanon at the Israeli city of Kiryat Shmona

=== 11 May ===
- The Gaza Health Ministry reported that at least 28 Palestinians were killed in Israeli attacks in the past 24 hours, bringing its count of the Palestinian death toll to 34,971.
- Hezbollah claimed to have hit Israeli "spy installations" at the Jal al-Alam site along the border.
- The IDF told residents of Jabalia and Beit Lahia to evacuate to western Gaza City, and issued new evacuation orders in Rafah.
- Hamas said that a British-Israeli hostage succumbed to wounds sustained from an Israeli airstrike.
- Israel announced that a soldier of the Nahal Brigade was killed in a gunfight with Hamas fighters in the Zeitoun neighbourhood of Gaza the day prior, bringing the IDF death toll in the Gaza Strip to 272.

=== 12 May ===
- The Gaza Health Ministry reported that at least 63 Palestinians were killed in Israeli attacks in the past 24 hours, bringing its count of the Palestinian death toll to 35,034.
- Al Jazeera reported that Israeli forces started bombing in Jabalia, killing and injuring several Palestinians.
- Israeli forces shot and killed a Palestinian man during a raid on the Balata Camp.
- An Israeli air strike on Deir al-Balah killed multiple people, including a paediatric surgeon and his son.
- Israeli settlers set a house on fire in the village of Duma, south of Nablus.
- Three people were injured after rocket attacks from Gaza hit Ashkelon.
- A spokesperson from the Palestinian Civil Defence said that all hospitals in northern Gaza are "out of service".
- An IDF Brigade General was injured while in combat in the Gaza Strip.
- The Wafa news agency claimed settlers protected by Israeli soldiers attacked the town of Qusra, south of Nablus, injuring some Palestinians.
- The Palestine Red Crescent Society said that Israeli shelling in the central Gazan town of al-Zuwaida killed four children, including an infant.
- The Al-Qassam Brigades claimed multiple attacks on Israeli forces in eastern Jabalia, including an attack where they blew up a boobytrapped house Israeli soldiers inside, causing an unknown number of casualties.

=== 13 May ===
- The Gaza Health Ministry reported that at least 57 Palestinians were killed in Israeli attacks in the past 24 hours, bringing its count of the Palestinian death toll to 35,091.
- An Indian UNDSS staff member was killed and another was wounded when an attack hit their vehicle near Rafah.
- Israeli activists attacked a Gaza aid convoy at the Tarqumiyah checkpoint, setting vehicles ablaze and throwing packages of food onto the road.
- The IDF announced that five soldiers were seriously injured in separate incidents throughout Gaza, including two from the elite Yahalom unit.
- Turkish President Recep Tayyip Erdoğan announced that over 1,000 Hamas members were being treated in Turkish hospitals.
- The Palestinian Authority reportedly rejected an Israeli offer to take control of the Rafah Border Crossing.

=== 14 May ===
- The Gaza Health Ministry reported that at least 82 Palestinians were killed in Israeli attacks in the past 24 hours, bringing its count of the Palestinian death toll to 35,173. Israeli Prime Minister Benjamin Netanyahu said that those killed include 14,000 militants and probably almost 16,000 civilians.
- Israeli strikes in central Gaza killed 40 people. The IDF said that it targeted a Hamas command room in a UNRWA school in one of those strikes and it killed 15 militants.
- Heavy clashes between Israeli forces and Hamas were reported in Gaza City, Jabalia, and Nuseirat, while fighting continued in and around Rafah, with Israeli ground forces advancing into the Brazil and Jneina neighborhoods.
- The IDF issued an evacuation notice in the al-Atatra and Salatin areas of Jabalia after it said it expanded operations in the city.
- Hamas claimed a missile attack on an Israeli troop carrier in the al-Salam neighborhood of eastern Rafah, allegedly killing and wounding its crew members. They also claimed to have blown up an IDF bulldozer in eastern Rafah.
- Hezbollah claimed to have downed an Israeli spy balloon over the Israeli Kibbutz of Adamit near the border with Lebanon and fired rockets at the balloon's launch base and "management crew".
- Israeli settlers stormed the Al-Aqsa complex and raised the Israeli flag.
- A soldier of the 7th Armoured Brigade was killed in Rafah, bringing the IDF death toll in the Gaza Strip to 273.

=== 15 May ===
- The Gaza Health Ministry reported that at least 60 Palestinians were killed in Israeli attacks in the past 24 hours, bringing its count of the Palestinian death toll to 35,233.
- Al Jazeera reported that an Israeli air strike hit the home of the Brash family in the Bureij refugee camp, killing five people.
- Al Jazeera reported that a 20-year-old Palestinian man was shot dead by Israeli forces in Al-Bireh, West Bank.
- Al Jazeera reported that an Israeli forces shelling hit an UNRWA clinic in the Sabra neighbourhood of Gaza city, killing at least 10 displaced Palestinians.
- Al Jazeera reported that Israeli forces hit a group of people in al-Jalaa Street and al-Oyoun Street in central Gaza city with a drone strike, at least three people were killed and more were injured.
- Al Jazeera reported that Israeli forces shots killed a Palestinian nurse at the Jabalia refugee camp.
- An Israeli military contractor, who was working for the Israeli Ministry of Defense died of wounds sustained in a Palestinian mortar attack in the southern Gaza Strip two day prior.
- The IDF said it began operations against militants in the center of Jabalia and had engaged in intense battles over the past day, killing "a large number" of militants. Hamas claimed responsibility for anti-tank missile attacks against Israeli soldiers in the camp, killing a dozen in its Block 4 area, but the IDF did not report casualties.
- The UN estimated that around 600,000 people fled Rafah since Israel began its offensive in the city, including 150,000 in the past 48 hours.
- Two people, including Hezbollah commander Hussein Makki, were killed in an Israeli drone strike in Tyre, southern Lebanon.
- Five soldiers of the Paratroopers Brigade were killed in an alleged friendly fire incident after an Israeli tank mistook them for Palestinian fighters in Jabalia, bringing the IDF death toll to 278.
- Israeli forces attacked an internet access point in Gaza City, killing at least four people and critically injured more.
- Israeli settlers attacked commercial trucks and beat their Palestinian drivers thinking that they were humanitarian aid trucks near the illegal settlement of Giv'at Asaf.
- Hezbollah claimed to have launched a successful drone attack west of Tiberias.

=== 16 May ===
- The Gaza Health Ministry reported that at least 39 Palestinians were killed in Israeli attacks in the past 24 hours, bringing its count of the Palestinian death toll to 35,272.
- Israeli forces shot a Palestinian man dead in Salah al-Din Street in East Jerusalem after allegedly attempting to stab Israeli soldiers.
- The US completed construction for the Gaza floating pier and said that humanitarian aid would soon arrive to it.
- A soldier of the Bislamach Brigade was killed by a "munitions accident" on the border between Israel and Gaza, bringing the IDF death toll to 279.
- Canada imposed sanctions on four Israeli individuals accused of violence against Palestinians in the occupied West Bank.
- Israeli forces strike hit a family home in Khan Yunis, killing at least five people.
- An Israeli airstrike in the al-Faluja area of Jabalia killed four people including a pregnant woman.

=== 17 May ===
- The Gaza Health Ministry reported that at least 31 Palestinians were killed in Israeli attacks in the past 24 hours, bringing its count of the Palestinian death toll to 35,303.
- An Israeli aircraft bombed the al-Jaouni School housing displaced people in the Nuseirat refugee camp, killing four people.
- Three Israeli soldiers were injured by Israeli extremists who had set a truck on fire and injured its driver near the illegal settlement of Kokhav HaShahar, east of Ramallah.
- Israeli forces stormed the town of Anabta, shooting a 16-year-old in the thigh, in Qalqilya a man was shot while riding his bicycle as Israeli forces stormed the city, a man was also shot near the Jalazone refugee camp, north of Ramallah.
- Israeli forces shot and killed one Palestinian and injured another during a raid on the town of Bal'a, near Tulkarm.
- Three people, including a Hezbollah fighter and two Syrians, were killed in Israeli airstrikes on the villages of Najjariyeh and Addousiyeh in southern Lebanon.
- A soldier of the Paratroopers Brigade was killed in clashes in Gaza's Jabalia neighbourhood amid a new Israeli offensive into the area, bringing the IDF death toll in the Gaza strip to 280.
- The IDF recovered the bodies of three hostages killed on 7 October, including Shani Louk, from a tunnel in Gaza.
- Hamas official Sharhabil al-Sayed, who was in charge of the group's operations in Lebanon's eastern Bekaa Valley, was killed in an Israeli airstrike on his car in Majdal Anjar, Lebanon.
- Palestinian Islamic Jihad (PIJ) senior leader Islam Khamayseh was killed and several other members of the organization were wounded in an Israeli air raid in Jenin.

=== 18 May ===
- The Gaza Health Ministry reported that at least 83 Palestinians were killed in Israeli attacks in the past 24 hours, bringing its count of the Palestinian death toll to 35,386.
- Israeli forces bombed a residential block across from the Kamal Adwan Hospital, killing at least 22 people and injuring more than 30.
- Four people were killed by an Israeli airstrike in Khuzaʽa, Khan Yunis and one person was killed by Israeli shelling at a house in Abasan al-Kabira, east of the city.
- At least eight people, including women and children, were killed and 10 were wounded after Israeli shelling targeted a group of Palestinians filling water containers in the al-Faluja area of Gaza City.
- Two people were killed by an Israeli attack near Nuseirat camp, and two others were killed in an attack in Wadi Gaza.
- Witnesses in Jabalia refugee camp stated the IDF was demolishing homes while people were still in them.
- An Israeli drone attack in western Rafah hit a car trying to leave the city, killing one person. Two people were killed in central Rafah after Israeli forces bombed a home.
- A Panama-flagged crude oil tanker was hit by a missile in the Red Sea, no group claimed responsibly.
- Two soldiers of the Givati Brigade were killed and two others seriously injured by an explosion in a booby-trapped tunnel in Rafah, bringing the IDF death toll in the Gaza Strip to 282.

=== 19 May ===
- The Gaza Health Ministry reported that at least 70 Palestinians were killed in Israeli attacks in the past 24 hours, bringing its count of the Palestinian death toll to 35,456.
- An Israeli airstrike on a house in the Nuseirat camp killed at least 31 people and injuring 20.
- The Al-Quds Brigades claimed to have targeted a Merkava 4 tank near the Tamraz station in the Jabalia refugee camp and launched rocket attacks in the settlement of Sderot.
- Six people were killed by Israeli bombing of a house in the Daraj neighbourhood, east of Gaza City, while three people were killed by Israeli bombing of a school in the same neighborhood.
- Israeli forces bombed a residential building in the Jabalia al-Balad area of Central Rafah, killing at least three people.
- A group of Israeli settlers attacked a humanitarian aid truck from Jordan near the town of Tarqumiyah, west of Hebron. The group destroyed boxes of food and threw them on the road. Israeli settlers also attacked Palestinian vehicles on the Marajat road, northwest of Jericho, while another group of settlers with IDF protection attacked the archaeological site of al-Mas'udiyya in the village of Burqa, northwest of Nablus.
- A soldier of the Paratroopers Brigade’s 202nd Battalion who was injured on 15 May during fighting in northern Gaza died of his wounds, bringing the IDF death toll in the Gaza Strip to 283.

=== 20 May ===
- The Gaza Health Ministry reported that at least 106 Palestinians were killed in Israeli attacks in the past 24 hours, bringing its count of the Palestinian death toll to 35,562.
- At least eight Hezbollah fighters were killed in an Israeli airstrike on a building in Al-Qusayr, Syria.
- The International Criminal Court announced its decision to file applications for arrest warrants for three Hamas officials, Yahya Sinwar, Mohammed Deif, and Ismail Haniyeh along with Israeli officials, Benjamin Netanyahu and Yoav Gallant, for charges in war crimes and crimes against humanity.

=== 21 May ===
- The Gaza Health Ministry reported that at least 85 Palestinians were killed in Israeli attacks in the past 24 hours, bringing its count of the Palestinian death toll to 35,647.
- At least seven Palestinians, including a school boy, were shot dead by Israeli forces during a raid in Jenin.
- The al-Qassam Brigades claimed to have killed an unknown number of Israeli soldiers at the Tel al-Zaatar neighbourhood in northern Gaza.
- Three children were among five civilians killed by an Israeli drone strike in the Yibna refugee camp in Rafah.
- A soldier of the Givati Brigade and a soldier of a logistics group suffered serious injuries in southern Gaza.
- Israeli settlers unsuccessfully tried to block a humanitarian aid truck in occupied East Jerusalem.
- Israeli officials confiscated equipment of the Associated Press in Sderot and shut down its live feed on the Israel-Gaza border, saying that it had violated media laws by providing content to Al Jazeera. The shutdown and confiscation was later reversed following a massive outcry.

=== 22 May ===
- The Gaza Health Ministry reported that at least 62 Palestinians were killed in Israeli attacks in the past 24 hours, bringing its count of the Palestinian death toll to 35,709.
- The IDF said it conducted a strike in Khan Yunis that killed three militants, including a key Hamas member, while another strike killed five militants operating from a school.
- An Israeli soldier of the Battalion 222 was injured in Northern Gaza.
- Israeli forces operated in the Zawaida neighborhood in central Gaza, killing at least 10 people, including women and children.
- An Israeli attack hit a house belonging to the Abu Zaida family in the Bir an-Naaja area in northern Gaza, killing at least six people.
- Ireland, Norway and Spain announced that they would recognize the State of Palestine.
- Three soldiers, one from the elite Yahalom unit and two from the Netzah Yehuda Battalion, were killed in northern Gaza, bringing the IDF death toll in the Gaza strip to 286.
- A further five Palestinians were killed by Israeli forces during an ongoing operation in Jenin, bringing the overall Palestinian death toll since 21 May to 12.

=== 23 May ===
- The Gaza Health Ministry reported that at least 91 Palestinians were killed in Israeli attacks in the past 24 hours, bringing its count of the Palestinian death toll to 35,800.
- Three US soldiers were injured, one critically, in a noncombat incident at the Gaza floating pier.
- The IDF said it conducted a raid against militants in Beit Hanoun and announced the killing of Hamas' Beit Hanoun Battalion commander in Jabalia.
- Israeli airstrikes reportedly killed 12 people in Deir Al-Balah and ten others in Gaza City.

=== 24 May ===
- The Gaza Health Ministry reported that at least 57 Palestinians were killed in Israeli attacks in the past 24 hours, bringing its count of the Palestinian death toll to 35,857.
- An Israeli attack on the central Gazan town of az-Zawayda killed two people.
- The IAF attacked a house in the al-Fakhoura neighbourhood near the Jabalia refugee camp, killing at least five people. Another house was struck in the Sheikh Radwan neighbourhood, north of Gaza City, killing two people.
- At least 10 people were killed in the Shabiyah area of Gaza City after Israeli forces targeted an apartment complex.
- Twelve people were killed after the IDF bombed an aid storage warehouse in Deir al-Balah.
- Three hostages' bodies were recovered by Israeli forces in northern Jabalia.
- The International Court of Justice ordered Israel to halt its military offensive in Rafah following a petition by South Africa, but did not order a ceasefire.

=== 25 May ===
- The Gaza Health Ministry reported that at least 46 Palestinians were killed in Israeli attacks in the past 24 hours, bringing its count of the Palestinian death toll to 35,903.
- Four people were killed after an Israeli airstrike hit an apartment building in the Nuseirat refugee camp.
- Palestinian prime minister Mohammad Mustafa shared an image of an Israeli soldier reading a book in the library of the Al-Aqsa University in Gaza while a bookshelf burns behind the soldier. Mustafa stated that "Israel has targeted all universities in the Strip, with some being completely destroyed".
- A young Palestinian was injured during a gun fight with Israeli settlers with IDF protection in Qusra, south of Nablus. Another attack occurred in Dhahr al-Abad, southwest of Jenin, where Israeli settlers cut down 15 olive trees belonging to Palestinians using electric saws.
- The Al-Qassam Brigades claimed to hit an Israeli Merkava tank with a Yassin-105 rocket near the Salah al-Din Gate in Rafah. and two Israeli tanks in the Jabalia refugee camp, one behind the Abu Zatoun school and another at al-Burai junction.
- The Al-Qassam Brigades claimed that one of its snipers shot and killed an Israeli soldier in Jabalia.
- The IDF said that a soldier of the Bislamach Brigade was seriously injured while fighting in northern Gaza.
- One person was killed by Israeli artillery fire in the Khirbet al-Adas area of Rafah.
- Hezbollah claimed to have destroyed an Israeli tank and killed its crew using a missile in the al-Marj military site.
- Ten people were killed and over 17 people injured in Israeli attacks on a school in the Saftawi neighbourhood in northern Gaza.
- Four vessels at the Gaza humanitarian dock were separated from their moorings by strong waves and ran aground at separate locations in the Gaza Strip and Israel.
- Three people, including a Syrian man working for Hezbollah, were killed in an Israeli drone strike in Al-Qusayr.

=== 26 May ===
- The Gaza Health Ministry reported that at least 81 Palestinians were killed in Israeli attacks in the past 24 hours, bringing its count of the Palestinian death toll to 35,984.
- At least people 40 were killed and over 65 injured in an Israeli airstrike at a camp in the Tel al-Sultan neighborhood. It was reported several people were burned alive in the attack.
- The Al-Qassam Brigades claimed to have injured and captured an unknown number of Israeli soldiers in an ambush by luring them into a tunnel in Jabalia. The IDF denied the claim.
- Hezbollah claimed to have struck an Israeli technical system at the Al Abad military post on the Lebanese border.
- Hamas fired eight rockets towards the Tel Aviv area. Several missiles were intercepted. The remaining caused damage to buildings and public spaces. No injuries were reported.
- An Israeli reservist in Gaza called for a mutiny against the Israeli government but was dismissed by the IDF and later interrogated by Israel Police.
- A soldier of the Givati Brigade's Rotem Battalion was killed in northern Gaza, while a soldier of the Eilat lieutenant unit was injured in southern Gaza. A sergeant of the Netzah Yehuda Battalion died of injuries sustained in Gaza on 22 May, bringing the IDF death toll to 288.
- Twelve people were killed and more than 20 were injured after Israeli forces bombed a house in Jabalia al-Nazlh.

=== 27 May ===
- The Gaza Health Ministry reported that at least 66 Palestinians were killed in Israeli attacks in the past 24 hours, bringing its count of the Palestinian death toll to 36,050.
- Israel banned the Spanish consulate in Jerusalem from providing services to residents of the Palestinian Authority.
- The IAF bombed a house belonging to the bombed the home of the al-Batran family in the Zarqa area, north of Gaza City, killing five people including a pregnant mother and her child. Another person was killed in a separate attack in the Bureij refugee camp.
- A 14-year-old Palestinian boy was shot and killed by Israeli forces in Sa'ir, northeast of Hebron.
- Israeli and Egyptian soldiers clashed near Rafah, resulting in the death of one Egyptian.
- Three Palestinian police officers were killed by an Israeli air raid in Nuseirat refugee camp.
- One person was killed and ten others were injured by an Israeli drone strike on a motorcycle outside a hospital in Bint Jbeil in southern Lebanon.

=== 28 May ===
- The Gaza Health Ministry reported that at least 46 Palestinians were killed in Israeli attacks in the past 24 hours, bringing its count of the Palestinian death toll to 36,096.
- An Israeli tank shelling of the Al-Mawasi tent camp, resulting in 21 deaths, was denounced by the Gaza health authorities and denied by Israel.
- Israeli airstrikes in western Rafah killed seven people.
- The Al-Quds Brigades claimed to have shot down an Israeli quadcopter in the Jabalia Camp.
- Six people were killed near the Kamal Adwan Hospital after Israeli forces continued their attacks on the area.
- Three soldiers of the Nahal Brigade were killed and three others were injured by an explosion in a booby-trapped building in Rafah, bringing the IDF death toll in the Gaza Strip to 291.

=== 29 May ===
- The Gaza Health Ministry reported that at least 75 Palestinians were killed in Israeli attacks in the past 24 hours, bringing its count of the Palestinian death toll to 36,171.
- One person was killed after Israeli forces attacked the western part of Deir el-Balah.
- Hamas operatives opened fire at Israel’s Bat Hefer from the Tulkarm Governorate in the West Bank, causing damage.
- A soldier of the Paratroopers Brigade was killed fighting Hamas in northern Gaza, bringing the IDF death toll in the Gaza Strip to 292.
- The IDF said it gained operational control of the Philadelphi Corridor.
- Six Hezbollah fighters were killed in an Israeli airstrike in the Al-Forqols area in Homs Governorate, Syria.

=== 30 May ===
- The Gaza Health Ministry reported that at least 53 Palestinians were killed in Israeli attacks in the past 24 hours, bringing its count of the Palestinian death toll to 36,224.
- Two Israeli soldiers of the Kfir Brigade died of their injuries after they were run over in a car-ramming attack outside Nablus the evening prior.
- Nine people were killed after Israeli forces bombed a family home in Beit Hanoun.
- Seven people were killed after an Israeli drone attack hit a populated area where displaced people take shelter in Northern Gaza. One person was killed after an Israeli drone strike in the Al-Shati refugee camp.
- Israeli snipers killed three Palestinian civilians in the Tal al-Hawa neighbourhood of Gaza City.
- The government of Slovenia announced its intention to recognize the State of Palestine.
- Israeli air defense mistakenly took down an IDF drone in the settlement of Shlomi.
- Two Israeli soldiers were killed by Hamas whilst fighting in Gaza, bringing the IDF death toll in the Gaza strip to 294.
- A vegetable market was set alight after Israeli forces raided Ramallah.

=== 31 May ===
- The Gaza Health Ministry reported that at least 60 Palestinians were killed in Israeli attacks in the past 24 hours, bringing its count of the Palestinian death toll to 36,284.
- Four people were killed in the Bureij camp after an Israeli airstrike hit a house belonging to the al-Hur family. Five people were killed after Israeli forces bombed a house belonging to the al-Sous family in the same camp.
- Three people were injured after an Israeli airstrike hit a residential building in the Tuffah neighbourhood of Gaza City.
- At least 14 people were killed and 42 injured after US and UK airstrikes hit the Houthi-controlled Al Hudaydah Governorate in Yemen. In response the Houthis launched a missile attack on the USS Dwight D. Eisenhower.
- Three people were killed after an Israeli airstrike targeted a car in the Nuseirat camp.
- An Israeli airstrike on an ambulance killed a medic and wounded another in Naqoura, southern Lebanon.
- Two people were killed by an Israeli attack near a university in the Tal al-Hawa neighborhood of Gaza City.
- The IDF announced its withdrawal from Jabalia after weeks of intense fighting. Palestinian officials said that 70% of the refugee camp was destroyed. The IDF said that it had destroyed Palestinian rocket launchers and over 10 kilometers of underground tunnels, and recovered the bodies of seven Israeli hostages.
- U.S. president Joe Biden announced an Israeli ceasefire proposal.
- UNRWA stated it had received reports of the IDF setting displaced peoples' tents on fire.

== June 2024 ==
=== 1 June ===
- The Gaza Health Ministry reported that at least 95 Palestinians were killed in Israeli attacks in the past 24 hours, bringing its count of the Palestinian death toll to 36,379.
- A 13-year-old Palestinian child died from malnutrition and dehydration at the Al-Aqsa Martyrs Hospital in Deir el-Balah, making them the 37th person that died from malnutrition since the start of the war.
- Three Palestinians were killed by Israeli artillery in the Rimal neighborhood of Gaza City.
- Three Palestinian men were shot by Israeli forces during a raid in the Balata refugee camp, east of Nablus. A young Palestinian man was seriously injured after being shot by Israeli forces in the Marhaba neighborhood of Al-Bireh.
- Israeli forces raided the Sabra and Zeitoun neighborhoods.
- Israeli forces clashed with the Al-Quds Brigades during their raid on Tubas and Jaba'.
- Hezbollah shelled the town of Metula, damaging a building. It also struck Kiryat Shmona with rockets, injuring two people.
- The Islamic Resistance in Iraq claimed an attack on a "vital target" in Eilat.
- The Houthis claimed two attacks on the USS Dwight D. Eisenhower north of the Red Sea, the Marshall Islands-flagged AL ORAIQ LNG tanker in the Indian Ocean and the Malta-flagged ABLIANI crude oil tanker in the Red Sea. CENTCOM said that it intercepted two Houthi anti-ship ballistic missiles targeting the destroyer USS Gravely in the southern Red Sea.

=== 2 June ===
- The Gaza Health Ministry reported that at least 60 Palestinians were killed in Israeli attacks in the past 24 hours, bringing its count of the Palestinian death toll to 36,439.
- Israeli forces demolished a Palestinian house in the Al-Walaja neighborhood, northwest of Bethlehem.
- Two shepherds were killed by an Israeli airstrike on a house in the village of Hula, Lebanon.
- Seven Palestinians were killed by an Israeli attack on a civilian car in the Az-Zawayda area of Deir al-Balah.
- The Maldives banned Israeli passport holders in response to Israel's war on Gaza.
- The Al Qassam Brigades claimed an attack on an IDF D9 bulldozer in the Yibna refugee camp in Rafah.
- An Israeli airstrike hit a house in Bureij camp, killing two people. Israeli forces attacked a residence in Nuseirat, killing four people.
- Israeli forces attacked the Indonesia Hospital, destroying the Noura al-Kaabi specialised centre for dialysis patients.
- Two people were killed after an Israeli airstrike in the Abu Halawa area of eastern Rafah.
- The DFLP attacked an IDF site at an unknown location.
- The PFLP fired rockets at IDF soldiers near the Kerem Shalom border crossing.

=== 3 June ===
- The Gaza Health Ministry reported that at least 40 Palestinians were killed in Israeli attacks in the past 24 hours, bringing its count of the Palestinian death toll to 36,479.
- Seventeen pro-Syrian government fighters were killed after Israeli airstrikes targeted a factory near Aleppo, Syria.
- Israeli forces attacked an apartment building in the Sabra neighbourhood of Gaza City, killing four people.
- A Wafa journalist was detained by the Israeli forces in the Israeli-settlement of Ariel.
- The body of a woman killed by the IDF was recovered in the Abu al-Ajeen area, east of Deir el-Balah.
- The body of an Israeli medic who was presumed to have been taken hostage on 7 October was found in Nir Oz.
- Three Palestinian men were shot dead by Israeli forces during a raid in Nablus.
- The IDF announced the death of four hostages in Gaza.
- Three people were killed after an Israeli missile hit a house of the Ghanem family in northern Bureij.

=== 4 June ===
- The Gaza Health Ministry reported that at least 71 Palestinians were killed in Israeli attacks in the past 24 hours, bringing its count of the Palestinian death toll to 36,550.
- Two Palestinian men were shot dead at an Israeli checkpoint near Tulkarm. The IDF said the men were planning an attack on Israeli settlements.
- Three people were killed by Israeli shelling in the Bureij refugee camp. Israeli forces later launched an offensive in the camp, with at least 15 people killed and dozens wounded according to the Gaza Health Ministry.
- Two people were killed in the Zeitoun neighborhood of Gaza City.
- Three people were killed after Israeli forces bombed a house in the Daraj neighbourhood of Gaza City.
- The Al-Quds Brigades claimed to have attacked Israeli armoured vehicles near Tal Zourob in western Rafah.
- The al-Qassam Brigades claimed to have injured Israeli soldiers in Gaza City by luring them into a boobytrapped building and later destroyed it using a Thermobaric rocket, they also claimed to hit an Israeli Merkava after reinforcements came in southern al-Sabra neighbourhood.
- Israeli forces bombed a vehicle near a shelter for displaced Palestinians in northern Deir el-Balah, killing eight people including children. Israeli forces bombed a house in the city, killing five people.
- Slovenia officially recognized the State of Palestine.
- Switzerland's National Council voted against recognising the State of Palestine. However, foreign minister Ignazio Cassis stated that Switzerland was in favor of the two-state solution.

=== 5 June ===
- The Gaza Health Ministry reported that at least 36 Palestinians were killed in Israeli attacks in the past 24 hours, bringing its count of the Palestinian death toll to 36,586.
- At least ten people were injured by a drone attack in Hurfeish in northern Israel.
- Four people were killed after the IAF targeted a gathering in the Remal neighborhood of Gaza City.
- Israeli settlers from the illegal Yakir and Novim settlements bulldozed Palestinian lands in the Wadi Qana area, northwest of Salfit.
- The IDF said that it took operational control of the Bureij refugee camp and Deir al-Balah.

=== 6 June ===
- The Gaza Health Ministry reported that at least 68 Palestinians were killed in Israeli attacks in the past 24 hours, bringing its count of the Palestinian death toll to 36,654.
- The IDF struck a UN school in Nuseirat, killing at least 40 people. It claimed that it struck a Hamas compound in the school, and that militants who took part in the 7 October attacks were among the casualties.
- Three Palestinians were shot dead by Israeli forces during a raid in Jenin.
- A soldier of the Alon Brigade's Battalion 5030 was killed and 10 were injured in a Hezbollah drone attack in Hurfeish, bringing the IDF death toll in the conflict with Hezbollah to 21.
- A soldier of the Gaza Division and three Hamas members were killed when the militants attempted to infiltrate into Israel from Rafah, bringing the IDF death toll in the Gaza Strip to 295.
- The US sanctioned the Lions’ Den, accusing the West Bank-based group of "threatening peace and stability".
- The United States, Argentina, Austria, Brazil, Bulgaria, Canada, Colombia, Denmark, France, Germany, Poland, Portugal, Romania, Serbia, Spain, Thailand and the United Kingdom signed a statement calling for an agreement for ceasefire and release of their citizens whom Hamas took captive.

=== 7 June ===
- The Gaza Health Ministry reported that at least 77 Palestinians were killed in Israeli attacks in the past 24 hours, bringing its count of the Palestinian death toll to 36,731.
- Two Palestinians were killed by Israeli forces in western Rafah.
- Several Palestinian fishermen were injured after Israeli forces opened fire on a port in Rafah.
- Two bodies were recovered after Israeli forces bombed a house in the vicinity of the as-Salam Mosque in the Sabra neighbourhood of Gaza City.
- One Palestinian was killed after Israeli forces bombed Az-Zawayda.
- A Palestinian was injured after an attack by a group of settlers in the Ras Ein al-Auja area, north of Jericho. Israeli settlers also set Palestinian farmlands on fire in the villages of Burqa and Beitin, east of Ramallah.
- The Houthis claimed to have attacked two ships with missiles and drones, the Elbella and the AAL GENOA.
- Three Palestinians were injured in Qusra after Israeli settlers set a property on fire.
- The PIJ and the Palestinian Mujahedeen Movement conducted two attacks on IDF sites in southern Israel.
- Israeli forces clashed with the al-Aqsa Martyrs' Brigades in the al Ain refugee camp in Nablus.

=== 8 June ===
- The Gaza Health Ministry reported that at least 70 Palestinians were killed in Israeli attacks in the past 24 hours, bringing its count of the Palestinian death toll to 36,801.
- A Palestinian man was shot dead and two others were injured by Israeli forces during a raid in Anabta.
- The UN added Israel to the list of "countries that have committed abuses against children in armed conflict" after it had verified 5,698 "grave violations" against children by the Israeli forces in 2023. Hamas and PIJ were also included.
- The IDF announced the rescue of four hostages taken during the Re'im music festival massacre on 7 October in central Gaza. According to the Gaza Health Ministry, at least 276 Palestinians were killed and over 698+ injured by Israeli forces during the operation. However, according to the IDF, less than 100 Palestinians were killed.
- An officer of the Israeli Yamam unit was killed during a hostage rescue mission in central Gaza, bringing the Israeli death toll in the Gaza Strip to 296.
- Two people were killed after an Israeli airstrike destroyed a petrol station on the outskirts of Aitaroun, southern Lebanon.
- Anti-war and anti-government protests were reported in Tel Aviv and Haifa, 33 protestors were arrested.

=== 9 June ===
- The Gaza Health Ministry reported that at least 283 Palestinians were killed in Israeli attacks in the past 24 hours, bringing its count of the Palestinian death toll to 37,084.
- Three people were killed after Israeli forces bombed a residential building in Bureij.
- Israeli forces bombed an apartment building in the Daraj neighbourhood of Gaza City, killing three people including a child.
- Two cargo ships, the Barbuda-flagged Norderney and the Liberia-flagged MSC Tavivshi, were caught on fire on the Red Sea after it was attacked by Houthi missiles.
- Israeli minister and opposition leader Benny Gantz announced his resignation from the Israeli war cabinet.
- Hamas and the PIJ launched rockets at IDF positions near Rafah, and unspecified Palestinian fighters launched four rockets to Sderot.

=== 10 June ===
- The Gaza Health Ministry reported that at least 40 Palestinians were killed in Israeli attacks in the past 24 hours, bringing its count of the Palestinian death toll to 37,124.
- Six anti-tank missiles were launched from northern Lebanon to the Upper Galilee region, causing fires and damaging one house in Manara.
- The Houthis attacked the Tavvishi, a Liberian-flagged and Swiss-owned container ship in the Gulf of Aden, and another ship in the area.
- Two Palestinian males, including a 15-year-old boy, were shot dead by Israeli forces during a raid in Far'a, West Bank.
- Four Palestinians were shot dead by Israeli forces during a raid in Kafr Ni'ma, West Bank.
- The UN Security Council approved a ceasefire proposal backed by the US.
- Four soldiers of the Givati Brigade were killed and seven others were injured after a booby-trapped building collapsed on them, bringing the IDF death toll in the Gaza Strip to 300.
- The Houthis claimed to have arrested members of an US-Israel spy network.

=== 11 June ===
- The Gaza Health Ministry reported that at least 40 Palestinians were killed in Israeli attacks in the past 24 hours, bringing its count of the Palestinian death toll to 37,164.
- Palestine's first Olympic athlete, runner Majed Abu Maraheel, died at the Nuseirat refugee camp due to kidney failure related to an inability to receive medical care due to Israeli occupation.
- Three Hezbollah fighters were killed in an Israeli airstrike on a tanker convoy in a village in Lebanon's northern Hermel District.
- Hamas and PIJ agreed to the ceasefire resolution set by the UN Security Council.
- The Al-Quds Brigades launched rockets targeting IDF sites in Kissufim.
- The Islamic Resistance in Iraq claimed three drone attacks targeting Israel.
- One person was killed and another one injured after Israeli forces bombed a house in the Sheikh Radwan neighbourhood of Gaza city.
- Eight people, mostly children, were killed after Israeli forces attacked an apartment building belonging to the Ashour family in the Daraj neighborhood of Gaza City.
- A Palestinian man was shot during an Israeli raid in the Balata Camp.
- Six Palestinians were shot dead by Israeli forces during a raid in the village of Kafr Dan, West Bank. One Palestinian man was injured by Israeli forces in the Annab military checkpoint, east of Tulkarm.
- Israeli forces bombed a house belonging to the al-Talbani family in Az-Zawayda, killing two children and their father.

=== 12 June ===
- The Gaza Health Ministry reported that at least 38 Palestinians were killed in Israeli attacks in the past 24 hours, bringing its count of the Palestinian death toll to 37,202.
- A child was killed after Israeli forces bombed a house in Rafah.
- Four Hezbollah members, including senior commander Taleb Abdullah, were killed by an Israeli airstrike on a house in the town of Jwaya, southern Lebanon.
- Hezbollah launches 150 "projectiles" from Lebanon at Israel, several of them were intercepted but some did hit which caused fires.
- An 8-year-old Palestinian girl died from starvation in the Gaza Strip.
- Israeli forces raided the Burj al-Louh area, west of the Nuseirat camp, injuring several Palestinians.
- Israeli forces attacked a group of women in the Old City of occupied East Jerusalem.
- A fight broke out in the Old City, during which an Israeli soldier in plain clothes fired at a suspect and four civilians were injured.
- The Houthis claimed an attack on the Tutor in the Red Sea, adding that the ship was "in danger of sinking". The Houthis also carried out a joint military operation with the Islamic Resistance in Iraq on Israeli sites in Haifa and Ashdod.
- Four people were killed after Israeli forces bombed the central Gazan town of al-Mughraqa.
- A Palestinian man was allegedly killed execution-style by Israeli soldiers near the coastline of northern Gaza.
- One person was killed by an Israeli airstrike in Beit Hanoun.
- Six people were killed after Israeli forces bombed a house in the Zeitoun neighborhood of Gaza City.
- The UN accused both Israel and Hamas of committing crimes against humanity and war crimes in two parallel reports on the matter.

=== 13 June ===
- The Gaza Health Ministry reported that at least 30 Palestinians were killed in Israeli attacks in the past 24 hours, bringing its count of the Palestinian death toll to 37,232.
- The Houthis claimed responsibility for targeting a Greek cargo ship in the Red Sea.
- United States Secretary of State Antony Blinken accused Hamas of stalling the U.N-backed cease fire deal.
- Hezbollah claimed responsibility for attacking nine IDF bases with rockets and drones carrying explosives.
- Israeli forces shot and killed a 21-year-old man during a raid in Qabatiya, West Bank. Two other Palestinian gunmen were killed after exchanging fire with Israeli forces. During the skirmish, the house containing the gunmen was demolished by an Israeli bulldozer.

=== 14 June ===
- The Gaza Health Ministry reported that at least 34 Palestinians were killed in Israeli attacks in the past 24 hours, bringing its count of the Palestinian death toll to 37,266.
- A woman was killed and seven others were injured by an Israeli airstrike on a house in Jennata, Lebanon.
- The US imposed sanctions on the Israeli activist group Tsav 9 for blocking and damaging humanitarian aid convoys heading for Gaza.
- The al-Qassam Brigades said that an Israeli airstrike in Rafah killed two hostages.

=== 15 June ===
- The Gaza Health Ministry reported that at least 30 Palestinians were killed in Israeli attacks in the past 24 hours, bringing its count of the Palestinian death toll to 37,296.
- At least 28 Palestinians were killed after the IAF attacked three houses in Gaza City.
- Israeli forces shot and killed two fishermen in Gaza.
- An Israeli drone strike hit a motorcycle between the southern Lebanese towns of Bint Jbeil and Aitaroun, killing an unknown number of people.
- A 14-year-old Palestinian boy died from starvation in Gaza, making him the 28th child that died from malnutrition since October 7.
- Israeli forces shot two Palestinians during a raid in the Jalazone refugee camp.
- The Al-Qassam Brigades attacked an Israeli Namer combat engineering vehicle in Rafah with RPGs and ambushed them, killing eight soldiers.
- Two soldiers of the 8th Armoured Brigade were killed after an IED exploded on their tank in the northern Gaza Strip, bringing the total number of Israeli soldiers killed on 15 June to ten and the IDF death toll in the Gaza Strip to 311.

=== 16 June ===
- The Gaza Health Ministry reported that at least 41 Palestinians were killed in Israeli attacks in the past 24 hours, bringing its count of the Palestinian death toll to 37,337.
- The IDF announced that it would start daily "tactical pauses" in parts of Rafah from 08:00 to 19:00 local time to allow humanitarian aid to cross.
- The IDF announced the death of a soldier while fighting in southern Gaza.
- The Houthis attacked two ships in the Red Sea, the Captain Paris and the Happy Condor along with a US destroyer using drones and ballistic missiles.
- Israeli settlers set Palestinian lands of fire and attacked vehicles in the village of Burqa, east of Ramallah.
- Nine Palestinians, including five children were killed after Israeli forces bombed a house in Bureij.
- Israeli police detained seven-year-old boy in Mughayyer, east of Ramallah.
- The al-Aqsa Martyrs’ Brigades attacked a military site in Sufa in southern Israel using rockets.

=== 17 June ===
- The Gaza Health Ministry reported that at least 10 Palestinians were killed in Israeli attacks in the past 24 hours, bringing its count of the Palestinian death toll to 37,347.
- Israeli forces bombed a house in the Zarqa neighbourhood of Gaza City, killing two people and injuring 13 more. Three people, including a woman, were killed after Israeli forces raided a house in the Sheikh Radwan neighborhood.
- Prime Minister Benjamin Netanyahu dissolved the Israeli war cabinet.
- One person was killed and another was injured after Israeli forces attacked the Khirbet al-Adas area in northern Rafah.
- One person was killed after Israeli forces targeted a car with drones in Chehabiyeh, southern Lebanon.
- The US State Department designated Harakat Ansar Allah al-Awfiya, a member of the Islamic Resistance in Iraq, as a terrorist organization.
- The PIJ launched a rocket attack Targeting Israeli forces in Karem Shalom while the Palestinian Mujahedeen Movement targeted Israeli forces in southern israel.
- The Houthis claimed attacks on the Malta-flagged crude oil tanker Captain Paris in the Red Sea and the Denmark-flagged LPG tanker Happy Condor in the Arabian Sea.

=== 18 June ===
- The Gaza Health Ministry reported that at least 25 Palestinians were killed in Israeli attacks in the past 24 hours, bringing its count of the Palestinian death toll to 37,372.
- 17 people were killed after the IAF attacked the Nuseirat camp.
- Two Palestinians were killed after Israeli forces bombed al-Rashid Street in Central Gaza.
- Hezbollah claimed to have targeted an IDF factory in Sasa with Falaq missiles.
- A Palestinian man was shot and killed by Israeli forces in southern Bethlehem.
- Several people were injured after Israeli settlers threw stones at a vehicle while traveling on the al-Marajat road, northwest of Jericho.
- The MV Tutor, a Greek-owned bulk carrier ship sank in the Red Sea due to damage caused by a Houthi missile on 12 June, making it the second commercial ship to be sunk by the Houthis since 7 October 2023.
- The al Aqsa Martyrs’ Brigades, Al-Quds Brigades and the Popular Resistance Committees targeted Israeli forces at the Abu Mutaybaq site with mortars. The Mujahideen Brigades attacked Re'im with rockets.

=== 19 June ===
- The Gaza Health Ministry reported that at least 24 Palestinians were killed in Israeli attacks in the past 24 hours, bringing its count of the Palestinian death toll to 37,396.
- Three people were killed by an Israeli airstrike in the village of Yaroun, Lebanon.
- One Palestinian was killed by an Israeli airstrike in the Oreiba area of northern Rafah.
- Israeli forces bombed tents at the "humanitarian zone" part of al-Mawasi, killing seven people and causing a fire.
- The Al-Quds Brigades targeted the Homesh settlement with large IEDs.
- CENTCOM destroyed two Houthi drones in the Red Sea.

=== 20 June ===
- The Gaza Health Ministry reported that at least 35 Palestinians were killed in Israeli attacks in the past 24 hours, bringing its count of the Palestinian death toll to 37,431.
- One person was killed in an Israeli airstrike in the town of Srifa, Lebanon.
- Two people were killed after Israeli forces bombed a house in the Nuseirat camp.
- Israeli forces were targeted with explosives during a raid on the Far'a refugee camp, south of Tubas. Israeli forces also raided the village of al-Arqa, west of Jenin, the Qalandia refugee camp and the town of Beit Ummar, north of Hebron.
- Israeli settlers in Jericho blocked humanitarian aid trucks heading towards the Gaza Strip.
- An Israeli drone struck a petrol station in eastern Tulkarm, causing an explosion and fire.
- Israeli forces shot and killed a 15-year-old Palestinian boy during a raid in the West Bank city of Qalqilya,.
- Two soldiers of the Alexandroni Brigade were killed and three others were injured by a Hamas mortar attack in the central part of the Gaza Strip, bringing the IDF death toll in the strip to 314.
- Two Israeli soldiers were seriously injured in Rafah. The Al-Qassam Brigades blew up an Israeli tank using a buried IED in Tal as-Sultan. Palestinian fighters also attacked IDF troops in the Shaboura camp, central Rafah.
- Israeli forces struck a house in the Zeitoun neighborhood, killing eight people.

=== 21 June ===
- Armenia officially recognized the State of Palestine.
- Three Palestinians were shot dead by Israeli forces after they opened fire on a car in Qalqilya. Israeli forces later confiscated the vehicle.
- Israeli forces launched a raid on Gaza City's Sheikh Radwan neighborhood.
- Five people were killed after the IAF bombed the municipal building of Gaza City.
- Three people were killed after Israeli forces bombed eastern Khan Yunnis.
- Three people were shot by Israeli forces during a raid in Ramallah.
- 45 Palestinians were killed in Israeli attacks on Rafah and central Gaza.
- At least 22 people were killed in a shelling near the Red Cross office, which is surrounded by refugee tents, and was also damaged. The European Union condemned the shelling and called for an independent investigation into it.

=== 22 June ===
- The Gaza Health Ministry reported that at least 120 Palestinians were killed in Israeli attacks in the past 48 hours, bringing its count of the Palestinian death toll to 37,551.
- At least 42 people were killed by Israeli attacks in the Tuffah neighborhood and Al-Shati refugee camp.
- An Israeli armored vehicle drove past a group of ambulances in Jenin with an injured Palestinian man strapped on its hood.
- A 12-year-old boy was fatally shot by Israeli forces in Ramallah a week ago.
- Two fishermen were shot and injured by Israeli forces near a Gaza port.
- Two people were killed by Israeli bombardment in the Zeitoun neighborhood.
- An Israeli citizen was killed after his vehicle came under fire in Qalqilya. He had reportedly been shot and killed after driving into the town and his car was set on fire.
- The PIJ attacked an Israeli helicopter in Rafah with surface-to-air missile.
- A Palestinian man was assaulted by Israeli forces during a raid in Nablus.
- The Houthis attacked the Liberia-flagged bulk carrier Transworld Navigator with ballistic missiles in the Arabian Sea. The Houthis also attacked the USS Eisenhower after US officials ordered it to return home.
- A soldier of the 8th Armoured Brigade was killed in the southern Gaza Strip, bringing the IDF death toll in the Gaza Strip to 315.
- The Houthis claimed to have worked with the Islamic resistance in Iraq and attacked five vessels in the port of Haifa.
- Pro-Iranian militias claimed two attacks on the al Tanf Garrison.
- At least 42 Palestinians were killed in attacks on Gaza City. One Israeli strike in Al-Shati killed 24 people.

=== 23 June ===
- The Gaza Health Ministry reported that at least 47 Palestinians were killed in Israeli attacks in the past 24 hours, bringing its count of the Palestinian death toll to 37,598.
- Yoav Gallant visited Washington DC to discuss the war.
- In his first Hebrew-language interview since 7 October, Benjamin Netanyahu rejected the possibility of a permanent ceasefire, stating, "We are committed to continuing the war after a pause in order to complete the objective of destroying Hamas".
- Two medics were killed by Israeli shelling in the Daraj clinic in Gaza City, including the Gazan Director of Ambulances and Emergency Hani al-Jaafarawi.
- Israeli forces attacked a UNRWA aid distribution centre in Gaza City, Killing eight people and injuring ten.
- In Beit Lahia, two infants died from malnutrition.
- The Houthis attacked the vessel Stolt Sequoia in the Indian Ocean with several cruise missiles.
- Two soldiers were injured after antitank missiles from southern Lebanon hit Metula.
- The Islamic Resistance in Iraq attacked a "vital target on the coast of the Dead Sea" with drones.
- Israeli forces demolished two Palestinian houses in the al-Murashahaat area, southwest of Jericho.
- The Al-Qassam Brigades and Al-Quds Brigades shelled Israeli forces in the Yibna refugee camp in Rafah and claimed to have destroyed an "Ofek" armoured personnel carrier with a rocket west of the Tal Zourob neighbourhood in Rafah.
- The IDF claimed that a soldier was severely injured while Hezbollah claimed that a couple soldiers were killed after drones struck units stationed at a division headquarters in Ayelet HaShahar.
- Hezbollah claimed to have killed several soldiers after a drone hit the barracks of the IDF's Sahel Battalion in Beit Hillel.
- In Nuseirat, eight people were killed after Israeli forces bombed a house in the Sabra neighbourhood. Two people were killed in a separate attack on a power station.
- The al Aqsa Martyrs’ Brigades, Al-Quds Brigades and the Abu Ali Mustafa Brigades conducted a combined mortar attack near Kissufim.
- The Jordanian air force conducted two airdrops of humanitarian aid into southern Gaza.
- Pro-Palestinian protesters in Los Angeles, California protested outside the Adas Torah synagogue for it hosting an auction with My Home in Israel, an Israeli-based companying advertising land in Gaza as "Anglo neighborhoods in Israel". The protest turned violent due to pro-Israeli counter-protestors, leading several news outlets and politicians (including Mayor Karen Bass, Governor Gavin Newsom, and President Joe Biden) to condemn the incident as an "anti-Semitic attack" without addressing the cause of the protest.

=== 24 June ===
- The Gaza Health Ministry reported that at least 28 Palestinians were killed in Israeli attacks in the past 24 hours, bringing its count of the Palestinian death toll to 37,626.
- Netanyahu said that the war was entering its final phase.
- The IDF confirmed the death of a soldier held captive in Gaza.
- Israeli forces bombed the Bani Suheila traffic circle in Khan Yunnis, killing eight people, including security guards for aid trucks.
- Israeli forces intercepted two PIJ rockets over Ashkelon and Mefalsim.
- Morocco sent 40 tons of medical aid to the Gaza Strip.
- Israeli forces shelled a Lebanese civil defence team in the village of Taybeh.
- The Al-Quds Brigades claimed to have attacked Israeli forces and vehicles in the south of the Tel As-Sultan neighbourhood.
- At least one person was killed by Israeli bombardment in the Zeitoun neighbourhood.
- A young Palestinian man was shot and injured by Israeli forces near Zeita, Tulkarm.
- Israeli warplanes attacked the Lebanese villages of Aitaroun, Kfar Kila and Khiam.
- Israeli forces rearrested Palestinian legislator Azzam Salhab from his home in Hebron along with 40 other Palestinian men and boys across the West Bank. Israeli forces arrested a 12-year-old boy after a raid on his family home in Beit Ummar, north of Hebron,

=== 25 June ===
- The Gaza Health Ministry reported that at least 32 Palestinians were killed in Israeli attacks in the past 24 hours, bringing its count of the Palestinian death toll to 37,658.
- Twenty-four Palestinians were arrested by the IDF in the West Bank.
- Israeli forces attacked Palestinians seeking aid supplies in Khan Yunis, killing ten people.
- Israeli forces bombed the family home of Hamas political leader Ismail Haniyeh in the Shati camp, killing ten people including his sister.
- Israeli settlers burned Palestinian-owned land near Qusra.
- Israeli forces bombed al-Wehda street in western Gaza City, killing three people.
- Israeli forces arrested four people and raided al-Dawha, Jab'a, the Dheisheh refugee camp, Karkafa and Wad Shaheen. During their raid in Jab'a they entered a house and took all valuables.
- Israeli forces stormed the Balata refugee camp, injuring two Palestinian children.
- Israeli forces bombed a house in the Maghazi refugee camp, killing five people including three children.
- Israeli forces bombed a house belonging to the Abu Awad family in Beit Lahia, injuring an unknown number of people, including children.
- Israeli soldiers attacked an elderly Palestinian woman sleeping in her home in Jabalia.
- Hamas uses a Chinese Pakistanian missile for the first time.

=== 26 June ===
- The Gaza Health Ministry reported that at least 60 Palestinians were killed in Israeli attacks in the past 24 hours, bringing its count of the Palestinian death toll to 37,718.
- Three people, including a woman, were killed in an Israeli airstrike near a mosque in Sayyidah Zaynab, in southern Syria.
- Eleven houses were demolished by Israeli forces in Masafer Yatta, south of Hebron.

=== 27 June ===
- The Gaza Health Ministry reported that at least 47 Palestinians were killed in Israeli attacks in the past 24 hours, bringing its count of the Palestinian death toll to 37,765.
- A soldier of the Kfir Brigade was killed and 16 others were wounded after two IED blasts targeted Israeli forces during a raid in Jenin.
- Israeli tanks advanced into Shejaiya, Gaza City and ordered its residents to move south.
- Sixty-eight ill Palestinian minors, including five with cancer, were evacuated through the Kerem Shalom border crossing to be treated in Egypt.
- A soldier of the Nahal Brigade was killed fighting in southern Gaza, bringing the IDF death toll in the Gaza Strip to 316.
- Israeli forces re-invaded the al-Shuja'iyya neighborhood in a surprise attack. Many families who had returned to their damaged homes when Israeli forces withdrew two months earlier were forced to flee the neighborhood again. The attack targeted the area surrounding Sabha hospital. Fighting continued for two weeks and by early July, Israeli forces had expanded the invasion into adjacent neighborhoods of Gaza City.

=== 28 June ===
- The IDF advanced in Rafah's Shakoush neighborhood and Shuja'iyya, Gaza City.
- Four Israeli soldiers were killed and six were critically injured after they were lured in a house that was boobytrapped with explosives in Shuja'iyya.
- Eleven people were killed by Israeli tank shelling in Rafah.
- Three medics were killed after Israeli forces bombed their headquarters in the Nuseirat camp.
- At least two children were killed and five injured after Israeli jets bombed a house in the Yarmouk neighborhood of Gaza City.
- The Houthis claimed to have targeted four vessels in the Red Sea and the Mediterranean Sea with the Islamic Resistance in Iraq, including the Panamanian-flagged tanker Waler which was attacked by drones.
- A Palestinian man was shot and injured by Israeli forces during a raid in Beit Ummar, south of Hebron.
- Israeli forces assaulted a Palestinian man during a raid in As-Samu, south of Hebron.
- A large fire broke out in the illegal settlement of Kfar Etzion, south of Bethlehem. The fire spread to an IDF base nearby which caused the evacuation of over 200 soldiers of the Etzioni Brigade. No one claimed responsibly for the fire.
- The European Council sanctioned six people and three entities for allegedly financing Hamas and PIJ.
- Two soldiers from the Paratroopers Brigade's 890th Battalion and the 7th Armored Brigade's 77th Battalion were killed in northern Gaza, bringing the IDF death toll in the Gaza Strip to 318. A soldier of the Nahal Brigade's 931st Battalion was also killed in southern Gaza.
- A Palestinian woman was injured by shrapnel, along with another person during an attack by armed Israeli settlers in Madama, south of Nablus.
- Israeli forces assaulted three people in the Nablus neighborhood of Fatayer.
- The far-right Israeli Finance Minister Bezalel Smotrich stated that for every country that recognizes the State of Palestine, Israel will establish a new illegal settlement.
- Eleven Palestinians were killed and over 40 injured after Israeli forces bombed tents in Al-Mawasi, Rafah.
- Israeli forces killed three Palestinian civil defence team members in the Nuseirat camp.
- Israeli forces shot and killed a Syrian farmer whilst he was working on his farm near Al-Rufaydah, located near the occupied Golan Heights.
- Three Palestinian civil defence members were killed by Israeli strikes in Bureij.
- At least four people were killed by Israeli air strikes in Deir el-Balah, namely a woman and a child in the al-Baraka area and two others in al-Beeah Street.

=== 29 June ===
- The Gaza Health Ministry reported that at least 69 Palestinians were killed in Israeli attacks in the past 48 hours, bringing its count of the Palestinian death toll to 37,834.
- Israeli forces clashed with Al-Aqsa Martyrs Brigades fighters during the former's assault on the al-Makhfiyeh neighborhood of Nablus.
- Israeli armoured vehicles were attacked with molotov cocktails while storming the town of Sebastia.
- Israeli forces bombed a house in Gaza City, killing four people and injuring ten others.
- Two soldiers were killed and two soldiers from the Golan Brigade's 13th Battalion and the Givati Brigade's Rotem Battalion were seriously injured while fighting in Northern Gaza.
- Mass demonstrations took place in Tel Aviv, calling for Netanyahu to resign.
- The Arab League removed Hezbollah from its list of terrorist groups.
- Three people were killed by bombings in Rafah. Two people were killed by an Israeli air attack near the Al-Istiqama mosque in the Al-Jeneina neighbourhood, east of Rafah.
- Four people were killed after Israeli war planes struck a house in Bureij.
- Israeli forces assaulted a Palestinian man in the Jbara military checkpoint, south of Tulkarm.
- Four people were killed after Israeli forces bombed a house in Gaza City's Sabra neighborhood.
- Four members of the al-Ghazi family were killed after Israeli forces targeted and shelled a group of people trying to get water in Gaza City.
- Five people were killed after Israeli forces targeted and bombed a gathering of people in a municipal park in central Gaza City.

=== 30 June ===
- The Gaza Health Ministry reported that at least 43 Palestinians were killed in Israeli attacks in the past 24 hours, bringing its count of the Palestinian death toll to 37,877.
- PIJ commander Saeed Jaber was killed and four others were wounded in an Israeli drone strike in Nur Shams, West Bank.
- Four Palestinians were killed after Israeli forces shelled the Al-Waha area in Beit Lahia.
- Israeli forces used Palestinian prisoners as human shields in the Gaza Strip by tying them with ropes, installing cameras on their bodies, and forcing them to enter destroyed buildings and tunnels in search of explosives. Many of the prisoners were injured.
- One person was killed and another one injured after Israeli forces shelled a house in Sheikh Radwan.
- A Palestinian man with mental illness who went missing in Gaza was found with a fractured skull, damaged vision and multiple gunshot wounds, his family said that he was allegedly detained by Israeli forces for two weeks and tortured him while under custody.
- Maariv, An Israeli newspaper claimed that approximately 500 IDF armoured vehicles have been damaged or destroyed ever since the conflict began on October last year

== July 2024 ==
=== 1 July ===
- The Gaza Health Ministry reported that at least 23 Palestinians were killed in Israeli attacks in the past 24 hours, bringing its count of the Palestinian death toll to 37,900.
- Fifty-five Palestinian detainees, including the director of Al-Shifa Hospital, were released by Israel due to a lack of evidence linking them to Hamas.
- An explosion in a building in Rafah killed a soldier of the Nahal Brigade's 931st Battalion and wounded nine others, bringing the IDF death toll to 319.
- One person was killed by an Israeli attack in Al-Fukhari, east of Khan Yunis.
- The PIJ fired 20 rockets from Khan Yunis at the Israeli border communities of Kissufim, Nirim, Sufa and Holit in the largest barrage in seven months in response to "crimes of the Zionist enemy", causing no injuries or damage. The Al-Aqsa martyrs' brigades launched rockets at two IDF sites.
- A Palestinian boy and a woman were shot dead by Israeli forces during a raid in Tulkarm.
- The IDF ordered a mass evacuation from eastern Khan Yunis and parts of southeast Gaza.
- An Israeli soldier of the Duvdevan Unit was killed and another was seriously wounded by an IED detonation targeting their APC in Nur Shams. Clashes broke out between Israeli forces and the Tulkarm Brigade.
- A young Palestinian man was killed by Israeli bombings in the Musabbeh area, north of Rafah
- The Al-Qassam Brigades claimed to have killed Israeli soldiers in Shujayea using a TBG thermobaric rocket and snipers and attacked two Merkava-4 tanks with two Shawaz explosive devices.
- In Tulkarm, a woman in her 40s was killed by an Israeli drone strike on her house, while a 15-year-old boy was shot in the head by Israeli forces.
- The Al-Qassam Brigades claimed to have lured Israeli troops in a boobytrapped building used as a sniper's nest in Eastern Rafah.
- Two soldiers of the 8th Armoured Brigade were killed overnight between 1–2 July, bringing the IDF death toll in the Gaza strip to 322.
- The Islamic Resistance in Iraq claimed to have attacked "vital targets" in Eilat using drones.
- A 10-year-old boy was killed after the IDF struck his house in the Nuseirat camp.
- The Houthis claimed to have attacked four ships, three of them belonging to what they called the "evil trio", namely the Israeli ship MSC Unific in the Arabian Sea, the US oil ship Delonix in the Red Sea, the UK ship Anvil Point in the Indian Ocean, and the ship Lucky Sailor in the Mediterranean Sea "due to the company that owns it violating the decision to ban entry to the ports of occupied Palestine".
- Israeli settlers threw waste into the al-Auja spring, north of Jericho to deprive Palestinians of clean water.
- One person was killed after Israeli forces bombed a house in Bureij.
- Hezbollah claimed to have struck an IDF position in Kfar Giladi. Hezbollah claimed to hit the al-Samaqa site in Kfarchouba, located in the occupied Shebaa Farms.
- Israeli forces shelled a gathering of people near Abdel Aal junction on al-Jalaa Street, west of Gaza City, killing two people and injuring 10 more.
- Israeli forces claimed to have struck two buildings in Aitaroun and Ayta al-Shaab, with no reported casualties. The IDF also bombed Blida, Kfar Kila and al-Bayyaada in southern Lebanon.

=== 2 July ===
- The Gaza Health Ministry reported that at least 25 Palestinians were killed in Israeli attacks in the past 24 hours, bringing its count of the Palestinian death toll to 37,925.
- A Lebanese farmer was killed by an Israeli airstrike in the village of Bustan, southern Lebanon.
- Israeli settlers attacked cars belonging to Palestinians in Eli, southern Nablus. Some Palestinians were injured during the attack.
- At least four people were killed by an Israeli attack on Sheikh Radwan, and some were injured by an Israeli attack in Gaza City's Al-Zarqa area.
- Three people, including a child, were shot and injured by Israeli gunfire during a confrontation that broke out in Beita, south of Nablus. Israeli forces shot a child in Shams, east of Nablus.
- Four Palestinians were killed by an Israeli airstrike in the Nur Shams refugee camp.
- Israeli forces bombed a building in the "Safe zone" area of Deir el-Balah, killing nine people of the Hamdan family, including five women and three children.

=== 3 July ===
- The Gaza Health Ministry reported that at least 28 Palestinians were killed in Israeli attacks in the past 24 hours, bringing its count of the Palestinian death toll to 37,953.
- An Israeli soldier was killed and another was wounded in a stabbing attack in a shopping centre in Karmiel, northern Israel. An Arab citizen of Israel was identified as the assailant and was shot dead by Israeli security forces.
- Senior Hezbollah commander Muhammad Nimah Nasser was killed in an Israeli airstrike on a car in Tyre, Lebanon. In response, Hezbollah claimed to have fired 100 Katyusha rockets into Israel.
- An IDF combat dog mauled a Palestinian man with down syndrome in his own apartment and left to die.
- A 23-year-old Palestinian man was shot dead by Israeli forces during a raid in Jenin.
- An anti-aircraft missile from Gaza struck a home in Kfar Maimon, causing damage.
- Two soldiers of the 7th Armoured Brigade's 75th Battalion and the Givati Brigade's Rotem Battalion were killed and several others were wounded whilst fighting in northern Gaza, bringing the IDF death toll in the Gaza Strip to 324.
- Israeli settlers assaulted a Palestinian in Jabal Sbaih in the town of Beita, south of Nablus.
- Armed Israeli settlers from Ma'on threw rocks at vehicles and destroyed water supply in Masafer Yatta, south of Hebron.
- PIJ and other Palestinian fighters fired rockets into southern Israel, some landing at Kfar Maimon, the Mujahideen Brigades targeted IDF sites in Kissufim and Re'im with rockets.

=== 4 July ===
- The Gaza Health Ministry reported that at least 58 Palestinians were killed in Israeli attacks in the past 24 hours, bringing its count of the Palestinian death toll to 38,011.
- Two houses were burned down and livestock were stolen during Israeli settlers attacks in the occupied West Bank in the past 24 hours.
- A soldier of the Yiftach Brigade's 8679th unit was killed by a Hezbollah rocket attack in the Golan Heights, bringing the IDF death toll in the border conflict with Hezbollah to 20.
- A soldier of the Paratrooper Brigade's 101st battalion was killed in Shuja'iyya, Gaza City, bringing the IDF death toll to 325. Another soldier was severely wounded in central Gaza.
- A house belonging to a Palestinian who was killed by Israeli forces was demolished in Beit Ta'mir, east of Bethlehem.
- At least two Palestinians were killed and others were injured by Israeli air attacks in Gaza City's Daraj neighborhood. Five people, including three children were killed in Jabalia.
- Israeli settlers opened fire on Palestinian families in populated areas around Hebron, Israeli settlers also attacked tents of families in the villages of Dura and Berin, no casualties were reported.
- A demonstration showing solidarity with Gaza in Haifa was dispersed by Israeli police.
- Two people were killed and six people were injured after Israeli forces bombed a house belonging to the al-Rifi family in Gaza City’s Yaffa Street.
- The al-Qassam Brigades claimed to have ambushed Israeli soldiers in Shuja'iyya, killing and injuring several soldiers, and fired a SAM-7 missile towards an Israeli-operated Apache helicopter. Hamas also claimed to fired rockets at Israeli positions near Gaza City and hit three Merkava tanks with anti-armour explosives.
- Israeli forces claimed to have attacked the Lebanese villages of Ramieh and Hula via warplanes.
- The far-right Israeli heritage minister, Amihai Eliyahu called for the Israeli occupation of the Sinai Peninsula on X.

=== 5 July ===
- Seven Palestinian men were shot dead by Israeli forces during a raid on a house in Jenin.
- A Palestinian man was killed near Ramallah.
- Two Israeli soldiers were injured by a Hezbollah rocket strike in Kiryat Shmona.
- Four people were injured during repeated Israeli airstrikes in Bint Jbeil District, Lebanon. two of them were firefighters that were trying to extinguish a fire in Yaroun after the first strike, before being injured by a second strike.
- Two people were killed after Israeli forces bombed a house belonging to the Abu al-Shaar family in Gaza City's Nafaq neighbourhood.
- A Palestinian man died from his wounds after being shot by Israeli forces in Nur Shams a week ago.
- Israeli forces bombed the Sharjah School in Al-Shati Camp, Cairo School in the Al-Rimal neighborhood, Freedom School in the Zeitoun neighbourhood and the Musa Bin Nusayr School in the al-Daraj neighborhood which are used as shelter for displaced people, killing at least nine Palestinians.
- Several Palestinians were killed by Israeli bombardment of eastern Khan Yunis.
- The PIJ and the Al Aqsa Martyrs’ Brigades claimed to have attacked an IDF base in Nahal Oz with rockets. Both also claimed a separate mortar attack on IDF positions at the Egypt-Rafah border crossing.
- Three Al-Quds Brigades fighters were killed in Jenin.
- The Al-Qassam Brigades claimed to have launched an assault on an IDF base in the Tal as-Sultan area of Rafah, killing and injuring several Israeli soldiers. It also claimed to have attacked "a command and control site" in the Netzarim Corridor with the Al-Nasser Salah al-Deen Brigades.
- Five people were shot after Israeli forces raided Beit Ummar, north of Hebron.
- Israeli forces assaulted a PRCS crew in Beita, south of Nablus.
- Hamas claimed to have killed 10 Israeli soldiers and attacked four Merkava tanks during an operation in Shuja'iyya's al-Nazaz Street.
- Israeli forces bombed the town of Yahmar al-Shaqif in Lebanon's Nabatieh Governorate.
- A Hamas sniper shot an IDF soldier in Tal Zorob, west of Rafah.
- Israeli settlers attacked IDF soldiers with rocks at a recently destroyed illegal outpost near zur Harel, east of Ramallah.
- Israeli settlers from Ateret attempted to build into Umm Safa, north of Ramallah, attacking the outskirts of the village and cutting off the water supply, but were repelled by villagers.
- Hezbollah claimed to have bombed an IDF position in the occupied Kfarchouba hills.

=== 6 July ===
- The Gaza Health Ministry reported that at least 87 Palestinians were killed in Israeli attacks in the past 48 hours, bringing its count of the Palestinian death toll to 38,098.
- The IAF claimed to have targeted a Hezbollah observation post in Houla in southern Lebanon.
- Clashes erupted in Tel Aviv between Israeli police and protesters demanding a hostage deal with Hamas.
- Israeli forces bombed the UNRWA-run Al-Jaouni school in Nuseirat, killing at least 16 people and injuring 75 others, the majority children.
- Israeli forces struck the Lebanese town of Baalbek, killing one person.
- The IAF bombed the Qurum area in Jabalia, killing and injuring an unknown number of Palestinians.
- A Palestinian man was shot and killed by Israeli forces in the village of Bayt Ur at-Tahta, west of Ramallah. Israeli forces also injured nine people in Nablus.
- Israeli settlers set off a large fire in the Turmus Ayya Plain, northeast of Ramallah.
- The Al-Quds Brigades claimed to have attacked IDF sites around Sufa and shelled IDF vehicles at the Netzarim Corridor.
- The PIJ claimed to have attacked Israeli forces at al Khulafa Street in Shujaiya, killing and injuring seven soldiers.
- Israeli forces prevented Palestinians from entering the Al-Aqsa mosque ahead of the Islamic new year.
- Israeli raid in the Zeitoun neighborhood has killed two Palestinians.

=== 7 July ===
- The Gaza Health Ministry reported that at least 55 Palestinians were killed in Israeli attacks in the past 24 hours, bringing its count of the Palestinian death toll to 38,153.
- Gaza's media office released an updated statistic stating that Israeli forces had committed over 3,376 massacres since 7 October.
- An Israeli airstrike on a school in Gaza City killed four people, including Hamas-appointed deputy labour minister Ihab al-Ghussein.
- Israeli forces shelled the outskirts of the southern Lebanese town of Naqoura, there are also attacks in Aita al-Shaab and Qabrikha.
- Bodies of three Palestinians were recovered near the Kerem Shalom crossing with their hands cuffed.
- Israeli forces bombed a house in Jabalia al-Nazlh, killing ten people. Three people were killed by an Israeli raid in the Nuseirat refugee camp, while six people were killed after Israeli forces bombed a house in Az-Zawayda.
- Israeli forces killed eight Palestinians during a raid in Jenin.
- Israeli forces raided Birzeit and the village of Umm Safa, located north and west of Ramallah.
- Israeli settlers confiscated Palestinian land in Husan, west of Bethlehem, and began construction of a road.
- Israeli settlers chopped down olive trees belonging to Palestinians in Kafr Ni'ma, west of Ramallah.
- Israeli settlers raided Burqa, east of Ramallah, and torched a resident’s car.
- A staff member of the Islamic Waqf that runs the affairs of the Al-Aqsa Mosque was beaten by Israeli forces at the compound in occupied East Jerusalem.
- An Israeli Druze army major of the Combat Engineering Corps' 601st Battalion was killed in Rafah.
- Germany banned the upside down red triangle symbol used by the Al-Qassam Brigades to mark enemy targets.
- The Al-Quds Brigades claimed to have shelled IDF sites in Nahal Oz and Rafah.
- Hezbollah claimed attacks on three IDF sites and outpost near the border, including one in Bayad Blida and one in Birkat Risha, killing an unknown number of soldiers.
- Hezbollah claimed an attack on the IDF al-Baghdadi military site with missiles and another attack on the Nimra military base, west of Tiberias, injuring one person.
- Israeli warplanes attacked a group of people on Street 8 of the Sabra neighbourhood, killing two people.
- Israeli forces shelled the Lebanese towns of Yaroun and Maroun al-Ras.
- Six people were killed after Israeli forces bombed a house in Sheikh Radwan.
- Israeli forces bulldozed five acres of land belonging to a Palestinian farmer in Rafah, destroying all of his crops. Israeli forces also destroyed 3.7 acres and 10 acres of land belonging to two other farmers in the Gaza Strip.
- Israeli forces bombed the church-run Holy Family school in Gaza City, killing four people.
- The al Aqsa Martyrs' Brigades claimed to have attacked the community of Bat Hefer.

=== 8 July ===
- The Gaza Health Ministry reported that at least 40 Palestinians were killed in Israeli attacks in the past 24 hours, bringing its count of the Palestinian death toll to 38,193.
- The IDF ordered Palestinians to evacuate the neighborhoods of Tel al-Hawa, Sabra, and Rimal in Gaza City.
- An UNRWA school in Nuseirat was struck by Israeli forces, wounding several people.
- Israeli forces shot a Palestinian man in Qalqilya.
- Israeli settlers threw rocks at vehicles belonging to Palestinians in Huwara, south of Nablus. No one was injured.
- The Al-Qassam Brigades claimed an attack on Israeli soldiers in Tal al-Hawa, destroying a military jeep and a Merkava-4 tank.
- The Houthis claimed an attack on Eilat with the Islamic Resistance in Iraq.
- Israeli forces attacked buildings in the Lebanese towns of Maroun al-Ras, Aita al-Shab and Hula.
- Israeli forces shot and injured two people in Qusra, south of Nablus.
- The Al-Quds Brigades claimed said that it destroyed two IDF vehicles in Tal al-Hawa and shelled an IDF command centre in the Netzarim Corridor, while the Al-Qassam Brigades said that it targeted a group of soldiers with a homemade 114mm short-range "Rajum" rockets in the Netzarim Corridor.
- At least four people were killed after Israeli forces attacked a gathering of people near the Qadisiyah junction in the Tal as-Sultan neighbourhood, west of Rafah.
- Israeli forces demolished the Amira School in Masafer Yatta.
- Two people were killed by an Israeli shelling in the Sabra neighbourhood.
- The al-Ahli Arab Hospital was hit by two missiles.
- Four people were killed during an Israeli raid in Shuja'iyya.
- Israeli forces bombed a motorcycle in Qlaileh, Tyre District, killing one person. Israeli forces also bombed Burj al-Muluk with only material damage.
- Israeli settlers bulldozed the entrance gate of Salfit and blocked it using concrete.
- Ten people including women and children were killed after the IAF struck a house in Jabalia.
- In the West Bank, Israeli forces arrested six people in Faqqua, northeast of Jenin, one in Qalqilya and two in Nahalin, west of Bethlehem.
- A six-year-old child died of starvation, dehydration and a lack of medical supplies at Al-Aqsa Martyrs Hospital, raising the number of Palestinians in Gaza who died from malnutrition to 41.
- An Israeli soldier was seriously injured while fighting in northern Gaza.

=== 9 July ===
- The Gaza Health Ministry reported that at least 50 Palestinians were killed in Israeli attacks in the past 24 hours, bringing its count of the Palestinian death toll to 38,243.
- At least 31 people were killed and 53 injured in an Israeli strike on a tent camp housing displaced people next to the UNRWA-run Al-Awda School in Abasan, east of Khan Yunis. US-made munitions manufactured by Boeing were used in the attack. On the same day, the IDF carried out a series of coordinated attacks in Gaza City and Deir al-Balah, killing at least 50 Palestinians and injuring 80 more.
- An Israeli airstrike near the gates of a school in Abasan al-Kabira killed 29 people.
- A Palestinian Hamas critic was kidnapped and beaten by five armed men who claimed to be Hamas security forces.
- A 13-year-old boy was killed by Israeli forces during a raid in Deir Abu Mash'al.
- A soldier of the Maglan unit was killed in central Gaza, bringing the IDF death toll in the Gaza Strip to 327.
- A woman stated that an Israeli tank had killed her father and grandfather by running them over.

=== 10 July ===
- The Gaza Health Ministry reported that at least 52 Palestinians were killed in Israeli attacks in the past 24 hours, bringing its count of the Palestinian death toll to 38,295.
- The IDF ordered citizens in Gaza City to evacuate to the area of Deir al-Balah.

=== 11 July ===
- The Gaza Health Ministry reported that at least 50 Palestinians were killed in Israeli attacks in the past 24 hours, bringing its count of the Palestinian death toll to 38,345.
- An Israeli soldier of the 228th Brigade was killed by a Hezbollah drone strike near Kabri, Israel, bringing the IDF death toll in the conflict with Hezbollah to 21.
- The US sanctioned three Israeli individuals and five entities over violence in the West Bank.
- First documentation of historic Soviet artillery being used by Hezbollah.

=== 12 July ===
- Israel pulled back from some areas of Gaza City, though snipers remained to control the high ground.
- An Israeli airstrike in the center of Gaza City killed three people, including a baby.
- Palestinian civil defense teams recovered over 60 bodies after Israel's withdrawal from Tal al-Hawa.
- The Israeli Foreign Ministry released a list of 108 UNRWA employees whom it accused of being members of Hamas or PIJ.
