= Timeline of the Gaza war =

Daily log of ongoing armed conflict

- Initial attacks; (7–27 October 2023); Invasion of the Gaza Strip; (28 October 2023 – 23 November 2023); First ceasefire; (24 November 2023 – 11 January 2024); Yemen airstrikes; (12 January 2024 – 6 May 2024); Rafah offensive; (7 May 2024 – 12 July 2024); Al-Mawasi attack; (13 July 2024 – 26 September 2024); Attack on Hezbollah headquarters; (27 September 2024 – 16 October 2024); Killing of Yahya Sinwar; (17 October 2024 – 26 November 2024); Israel–Lebanon ceasefire agreement; (27 November 2024 – 18 January 2025); Israel–Hamas ceasefire agreement; (19 January 2025 – 17 March 2025); March 2025 Israeli attacks on the Gaza Strip; (18 March 2025 – 15 May 2025); May 2025 Gaza offensive; (16 May 2025 – 19 August 2025); August 2025 Gaza offensive; (20 August 2025 – 2 October 2025); October 2025 Israel–Hamas ceasefire agreement; (3 October 2025 – present)

The Gaza war began on 7 October 2023 when Hamas launched coordinated armed incursions on Israel from the Gaza Strip. However, the Gaza–Israel conflict precedes the 2023 attacks. As of September 27, 2026 over 75,000 people – 73,919 Palestinians and 2,046 Israeli – have been reported killed in the Gaza war according to the official figures of the Gaza Health Ministry and Israeli authorities, but this is not a conclusive list.

Some developments may become known or understood only in retrospect, so this is not an exhaustive list. Events on the ground for which the precise time is known are in Israel Summer Time (UTC+3) until 29 October when Israel Standard Time (UTC+2) resumed.

== See also ==
- Outline of the Gaza war
- Gaza–Israel conflict
- List of military engagements during the Gaza war
- Timeline of the Israeli–Palestinian conflict in 2023
- Timeline of the Israeli–Palestinian conflict in 2024
- Timeline of the Israeli–Palestinian conflict in 2025
- Timeline of the Israeli–Palestinian conflict in 2026
- Timeline of the Gaza Strip healthcare collapse
- Timeline of the Red Sea crisis
- Timeline of the Israel–Hezbollah conflict (2023–present)
