= Az-Zawayda =

Az-Zawayda الزوايدة
- Municipality type A (City)

Arabic transcription(s)
  - Arabic: الزوايدة
  - Latin: Zawaida (official) al-Zawaydeh (unofficial)
- Location of Az-Zawayda within Palestine
- Coordinates: 31°25′50″N 34°22′18″E
- State: State of Palestine
- Governorate: Deir al-Balah

Government
  - Type: City
  - Control: Hamas

Area
  - Total: 15.3 km^{2} (5.9 sq mi)

Population (2017)
  - Total: 23,841
  - Density: 1,560/km^{2} (4,040/sq mi)

Az-Zawayda (Arabic: الزوايدة), also spelled Zawaida, is a Palestinian town in the Gaza Strip, in the Deir al-Balah Governorate of the State of Palestine. It is located about three kilometers northeast of the city of Deir al-Balah and just west of Maghazi refugee camp. According to the Palestinian Central Bureau of Statistics (PCBS) 2017 census, there were 23,841 residents.

== History ==
During the Gaza war, an Israeli attack killed at least 13 people after hitting a house in az-Zawayda. Several weeks later, three Israeli missiles struck a warehouse used as shelter by a displaced family, killing at least 16 people, including six children. According to a neighbor, "They were asleep in their beds, kids and babies, then three missiles targeted their place". One of the killed was a wholesale retailer who worked with the Israeli military to bring food into the Gaza Strip.
