= Insurgency in the northern Gaza Strip =

2024 armed conflict in Palestine

- Part of the Israeli invasion of the Gaza Strip in the Gaza war
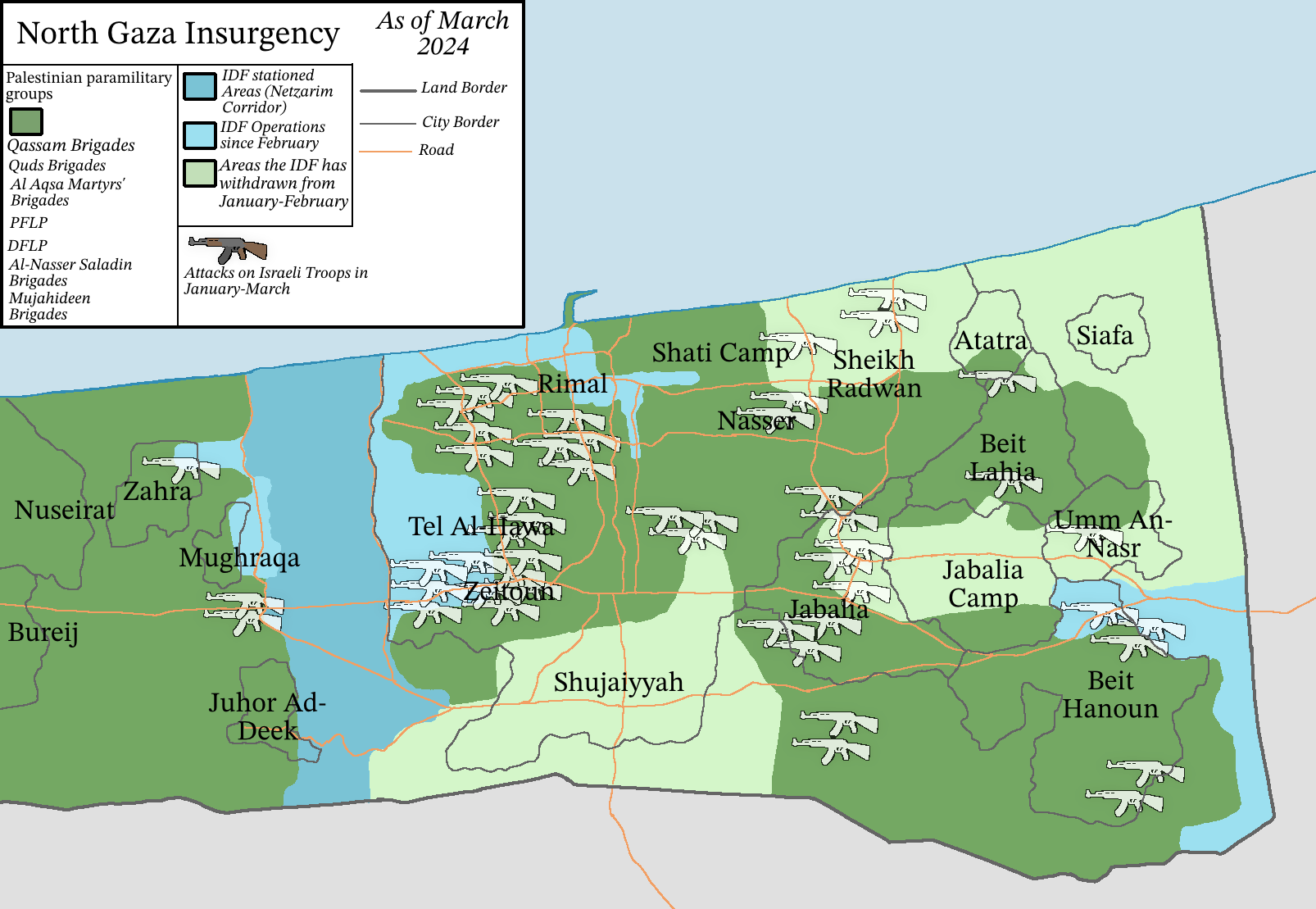
- Reported military situation in March 2024
Date	7 January 2024 – 19 January 2025 (2 years, 9 months and 1 day)
Location	North Gaza Governorate and Gaza Governorate, Gaza Strip, Palestine
Result	Inconclusive: Ceasefire and Israeli withdrawal from northern Gaza; Israel fails to remove Hamas from power

Belligerents
Palestinian Joint Operations Room; Hamas; Palestinian Islamic Jihad; Popular Resistance Committees; Popular Front for the Liberation of Palestine; Democratic Front for the Liberation of Palestine; (Fatah) Al-Aqsa Martyrs' Brigades; Palestinian Mujahideen Movement; (Fatah) Abdul al-Qadir al-Husseini Brigades; Palestinian Security Services; Palestinian Police	Israel

Commanders and leaders
(Hamas) Yahya Sinwar † (Hamas) Mohammed Deif X (Hamas) Mohammed Sinwar (Hamas) Izz al-Din al-Haddad; Faiq Al-Mabhouh † (Note: He was killed by the Israeli forces during a raid on the Al-Shifa Hospital)	Benjamin Netanyahu; Yoav Gallant; Israel Katz; Yair Palai; Yisrael Shomer; Ami Biton; Liron Batito; Beni Aharon; Neri Horowitz; Ido Mizrahi; Sebastian Haion †; Yitzhar Hofman †; Eyal Shuminov †

Units involved
(Palestine) Palestinian Joint Operations Room; (Hamas) Al-Qassam Brigades; North Brigade; Beit Lahia Battalion; Beit Hanoun Battalion; Al Khalifa al Rashidun Battalion; Martyr Suhail Ziadeh Battalion; Jabalia al Balad (Abdul Raouf Nabhan) Battalion; Imad Aql (Western) Battalion; Elite Battalion; Gaza Brigade; Sabra-Tal al Islam Battalion; Daraj wal Tuffah Battalion; Radwan (al Furkan) Battalion; Shujaiya Battalion; Zaytoun Battalion; Shati Battalion; Al-Quds Brigades; (Popular Resistance Committees) Al-Nasser Salah al-Deen Brigades; (Popular Front for the Liberation of Palestine) Abu Ali Mustafa Brigades; (Democratic Front for the Liberation of Palestine) National Resistance Brigades; Al-Aqsa Martyrs' Brigades; Mujahideen Brigades; (Palestine) Abdul al-Qadir al-Husseini Brigades; Palestinian Security Services; Palestinian Police	(Israel) Israeli Defence Forces; Israeli Ground Forces; Bislamach Brigade; Givati Brigade; Rotem Battalion; Golani Brigade; 13th Battalion; Israeli Combat Engineering Corps; Yahalom; Kfir Brigade; Netzah Yehuda Battalion; Paratroopers Brigade; 202nd Battalion; 7th Armored Brigade; 75th Battalion; 8th Armored Brigade; 129th Battalion; Israeli Air Force; Israeli Navy

Casualties and losses
(Palestine) 20+ militants killed (in early stages, per IDF); 1+ policemen killed	(Israel) 31+ soldiers killed (Israel) 1 Namer APC destroyed (Israel) 1 Merkava tank damaged (Israel) 1 IDF Caterpillar D9 bulldozer destroyed

The insurgency in the northern Gaza Strip was a series of armed engagements centered in the North Gaza Governorate, beginning after Israel announced it had dismantled 12 al-Qassam Brigades battalions on 7 January 2024, as part of the Gaza war.

Several Palestinian militant groups, led by Hamas, began resurging in territories formerly cleared by the Israel Defense Forces (IDF), after 4 months of bombardment and 3 months of ground invasion.

== Course of the insurgency ==
Palestinian brigades organised and consolidated areas that Israeli forces had withdrawn from, and rehabilitated civilian services such as police forces.

The brigades launched offensives on areas in the northern Gaza Strip held by Israeli forces. As a result, Israeli troops moved into areas that they have previously withdrawn from. A Namer APC repositioning in Sheikh Radwan on 19 January was ambushed by a militant with a dual attack, first by a Shawadh IED detonation succeeded by a Yasin-105 rocket-propelled grenade fired by a al-Qassam Brigade militants.

On 13 May 2024, fighting was reported in Jabalia refugee camp. The armed wings of Hamas and Palestinian Islamic Jihad (PIJ) claimed that their militants were targeting nearby IDF forces with mortars, anti-tank missiles, and machine guns.

According to the BBC, an unnamed senior Israeli military figures told Israeli media that Hamas's resurgence in northern Gaza was due to a lack of a specific plan from Israel's government for the "day after" the war. In January 2024, Channel 13 News said that IDF Chief of Staff Herzi Halevi warned Israeli leadership in private that their military gains could be eroded without a plan for the post-war management in Gaza.

== Israeli operations ==
=== Zeitoun operation ===
In late February, Israeli forces targeted the Zeitoun district in southwestern Gaza City with two brigades, announcing they were attacking paramilitaries in close quarters combat and with missile strikes.

The Israeli army acknowledged stiff resistance from paramilitaries in Zeitoun but not while Israeli vehicles advanced on the district, admitting casualties in three different engagements on penetrating forces on February 21. Fighting was mainly led by the al-Qassam and al-Quds Brigades, with minor support from smaller paramilitary groups.

=== Al-Shifa Hospital raid ===
On 17 March 2024, Israeli forces raided Rimal and occupied al-Shifa hospital following supposed intel that senior Hamas officials had regrouped and were using the hospital "to command attacks". Two patients on life support at the intensive care unit in the same building had died because the electricity supply was cut ahead of the raid.

=== Second Zeitoun Operation ===
On May 9, Israel renewed operations in North Gaza, sending a force into the Zeitoun district which had faced a major battle months prior. The IDF has admitted that 4 soldiers were killed on the first day.

=== Jabalia operation ===
On 12 May 2024, the IDF said that it launched an operation in Jabalia the previous evening "based on intelligence information regarding attempts by Hamas to reassemble its terrorist infrastructure and operatives in the area". According to residents fleeing the area, tanks were seen advancing towards the refugee camp, which was heavily bombarded.

=== Netzarim Corridor rocket attacks ===
On 15 August 2024, al-Quds Brigades, al-Aqsa Martyrs' Brigades and the Abdul al-Qadir al-Husseini Brigades fired rockets at IDF positions in the Netzarim Corridor.

=== Siege of Beit Hanoun ===
In Beit Hanoun, the IDF conducted bombings on the night of 11–12 November 2024 and targeted fleeing civilians with drones and sniper fire the next day. The IDF besieged some 130 families in a shelter in the city and forced them to leave at gunpoint.

Despite claiming to have "dismantled Hamas" in Beit Hanoun, Israeli forces who entered the abandoned city on 23 December were immediately ambushed by militants. The IDF acknowledged and incident where a combat vehicle in Beit Hanoun was targeted by anti-tank weapons, eliminating three soldiers.

On 28 December, Israeli forces previously in Rafah were redeployed to begin operating in Beit Hanoun. In another ambush whose details the IDF did not publicise, it acknowledged that three soldiers in Beit Hanoun were wounded and a West Bank settler in the IDF was eliminated.

On 4 January 2025, the IDF destroyed a major Hamas complex in Beit Hanoun.

An IDF company commander and his deputy were killed in Beit Hanoun after Hamas militants fired an anti-tank missile at their vehicle on 6 January, and a further three Israeli soldiers were killed when Hamas detonated an IED under their vehicle and three more were seriously wounded on the 8th.

On 11 January, an Israeli patrol fell into an ambush in Beit Hanoun. A Merkava was hit by an IED explosion, killing all four of its occupants. The remaining soldiers were then attacked by Hamas militants who opened fire on them before withdrawing, wounding a further six.

== Aftermath ==
A ceasefire between Israel and Hamas came into effect on 19 January 2025, with the IDF withdrawing from the North Gaza Governorate to a buffer zone along the Gaza Strip–Israel border on that same day.

== See also ==
- Timeline of the Gaza war (24 November 2023 – 11 January 2024)
- Outline of the Gaza war
- Timeline of the Israeli–Palestinian conflict in 2024
- Siege of Gaza City
- Battle of Jabalia
- Battle of Beit Hanoun
