= Alleged military use of al-Shifa hospital =

Part of the Gaza war

Al-Shifa Hospital was a government-run hospital in Gaza City, Palestine; most of the staff are employees of the Palestinian Authority in the West Bank. During the Gaza war, Israel and the United States stated that several complexes existed under al-Shifa Hospital, and that it was being used by Hamas as its "main operations base," a claim that Hamas and hospital administrators denied. International law prohibits the targeting of hospitals unless there is evidence it is used for a military purpose that is "harmful to the enemy", and it prohibits the use of human shields for combatants; both constitute war crimes.

Following Israel's release of video showing a Hamas tunnel with two small rooms under the hospital on 22 November, multiple news agencies concluded that the evidence did not demonstrate the use by Hamas of a command center. Amnesty International said on 23 November 2023 that they have "so far not seen any credible evidence to support Israel's claim that al-Shifa is housing a military command centre" and that "the Israeli military has so far failed to provide credible evidence" for the allegation. Izzat al-Risheq, a Hamas official, denied that the group used the hospital as a shield for its underground military structures, saying there was no truth to the claims. A later report in February 2024 by The New York Times said that the evidence provided by the Israeli intelligence suggested that Hamas did use the hospital as cover and stored weapons inside it, however the tunnel did not match the Israeli description of a Hamas command center.

Israel has been accused of waging a propaganda war to detract from accusations that its actions at al-Shifa constitute violations of international law. Medical staff at al-Shifa have accused Israel of directly causing the deaths of civilians being treated at al-Shifa, including prematurely born babies. The head of the World Health Organization called the November raid on the hospital "totally unacceptable".

Following the end of the Al-Shifa Hospital siege, United Nations High Commissioner for Human Rights Volker Türk called for an independent investigation, stating: "This is precisely where you need an independent international investigation, because we have different narratives, you cannot use ... hospitals, for any military purposes. But you also cannot attack a hospital in the absence of clear evidence." A raid in March 2024 saw Israeli and Hamas forces engaged in crossfire at the hospital.

== Background ==
=== Government funded healthcare in the Gaza Strip ===
Al-Shifa Hospital is a government-run hospital in Gaza City, Palestine. But, despite the Hamas government controlling most government activities in the Gaza Strip (such as police and law enforcement), the staff at Al-Shifa hospital are employed by the Ramallah-based Palestinian Authority in the West Bank, which is currently run by Mahmoud Abbas's Fatah government. The Hamas government in the Gaza Strip have sporadically funded individual health initiatives such as IVF treatments for infertile couples. IVF funding was widely popular and won massive public support, despite only being made available to a very limited number of couples on a lottery system. In 2017 The Guardian described this as a, "goodwill gesture by the ruling Hamas party". During the Israeli invasion of the Gaza Strip the main IVF clinic in the Gaza City was hit by a single tank shell, which directly hit the cryogenic storage lab and destroyed over 4000 frozen human embryos, and 1000 aliquots of frozen sperm and eggs, many of which were from couples who are no longer able to produce sperm or eggs.

=== International law ===
In late October 2023, the Israel Defense Forces (IDF) issued a statement about Hamas activities at al-Shifa Hospital, stating, "The Hamas terrorist organization has continued operating below Gaza's Shifa Hospital, using the thousands of patients, doctors and staff in the building to shield its underground headquarters".

International humanitarian law prohibits the targeting of hospitals unless there is evidence it is used for a military purpose that is "harmful to the enemy", as well as the use of human shields for combatants; both constitute war crimes.

== History ==
In 1983, the Israelis built "a secure underground operating room and tunnel network" beneath Building 2 of the hospital. On 20 November 2023, former Israeli Prime Minister Ehud Barak, referring to Israeli built bunkers from decades ago, told CNN "It's already [been] known for many years that they [Hamas] have the bunkers that originally [were] built by Israeli constructors underneath Shifa [which] were used as a command post of Hamas. And, a junction of several tunnels is part of this system." During a renovation in the 1990s a large basement was added, which the IDF later said was appropriated by Hamas and used to store weapons. According to Israeli officials, Hamas subsequently dug out the original basement, later adding new floors and connecting it as a hub within their existing tunnel system.

A France24 investigation in November 2023 concluded that the images and videos of the tunnels published by the IDF were consistent with Hamas built tunnels.

=== 2007 Fatah–Hamas conflict ===
During the Fatah–Hamas conflict in June 2007, Fatah and Hamas clashed at the hospital, killing one member of each organization. Some injured people brought to the hospital were killed by Hamas militants once inside. A doctor in the hospital reported, "The medical staff are suffering from fear and terror, particularly of the Hamas fighters, who are in every corner of the hospital."

=== 2008–2009 war ===
During the 2008–2009 Gaza War, The New York Times reported that "armed Hamas militants in civilian clothes roved the halls" killing alleged collaborators. Several reports by Israeli Shin Bet officials alleged that Hamas used Al-Shifa hospital as a bunker and refuge, knowing it would be spared by air strikes. The Israeli allegations were difficult to confirm because Israel had banned reporters from Gaza at the time. PBS' Wide Angle programme, which interviewed a doctor from Gaza who preferred to remain anonymous, said that he believed that Hamas officials were present under the hospital.

In 2009, the Palestinian Health Ministry, run by the Palestinian Authority in the West Bank, accused Hamas members of taking control of wards in Shifa Hospital.

=== In the 2014 Gaza War ===
During 2014 Gaza War, the hospital was described by journalists and authors as the de facto headquarters of Hamas. Amnesty International documented how the Hamas forces used the abandoned areas of the hospital to abduct, torture, and kill Palestinians accused of collaborating with Israel.

=== In the Gaza war ===
During the Gaza war the IDF said that the hospital was being used as a major command and control center for Hamas, and as a consequence it became a major target during the siege of Gaza, culminating in the siege and then occupation of the hospital. This position was disputed by Hamas and hospital administrators, both of whom denied the existence of tunnels beneath the hospital, with the latter requesting that the international community send a delegation to the hospital to verify their claims. US intelligence repeatedly stated that based on their own intelligence they concurred with Israel's assessment and by interrogations with captured Hamas militants, who said there was an extensive underground complex beneath the hospital.

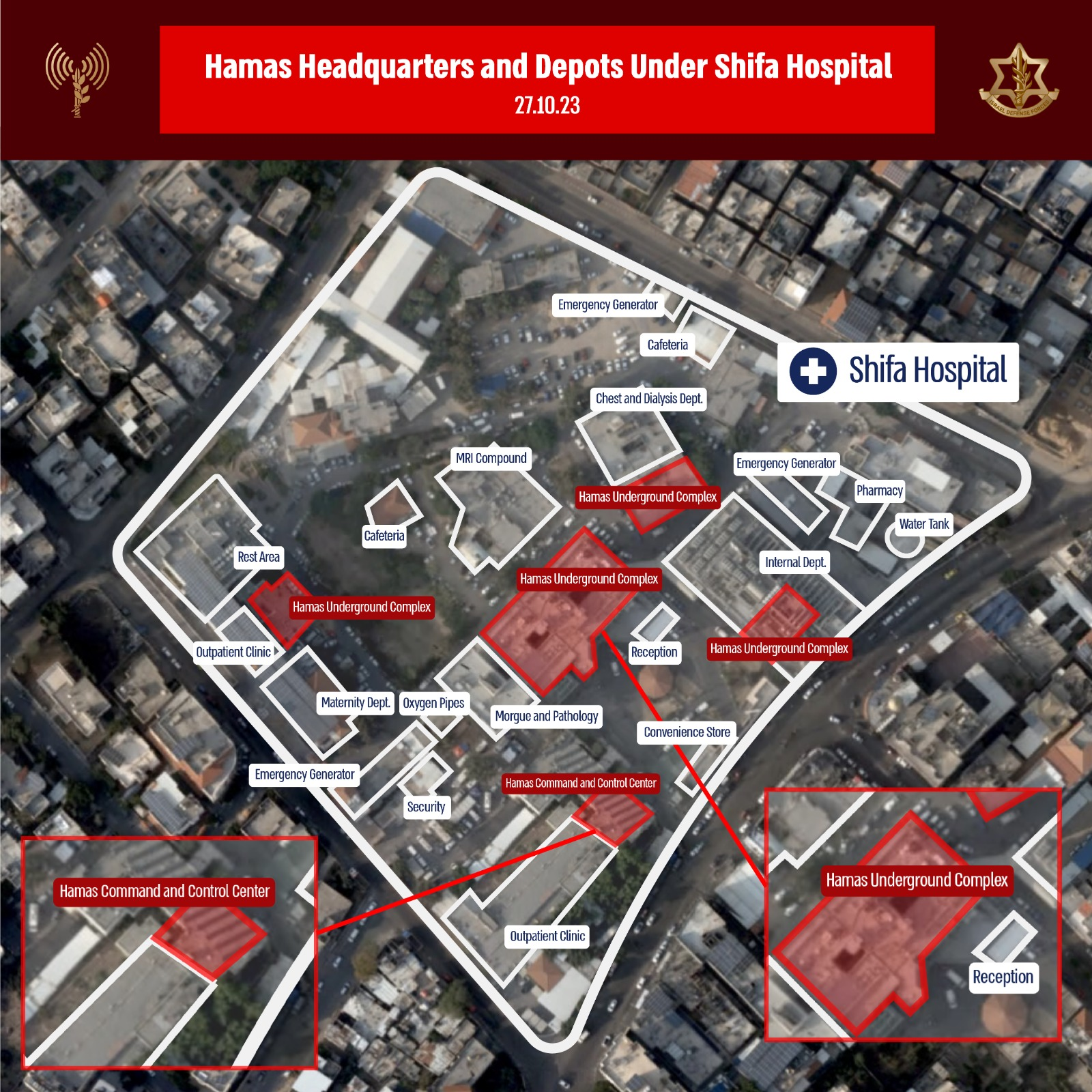
Map released by IDF Spokesperson's Unit alleging military use of the al-Shifa hospital compound.

The perception of the media was mixed; while they concluded that a network of tunnels did exist beneath the hospital and that Hamas had used the hospital to store hostages, they also found that Israel's evidence was insufficient to prove that the tunnels were a command and control center or that access points to the network existed within hospital wards. According to Israel, the reason for this was the existence of booby traps that prevented them from fully exploring the unearthed tunnel.

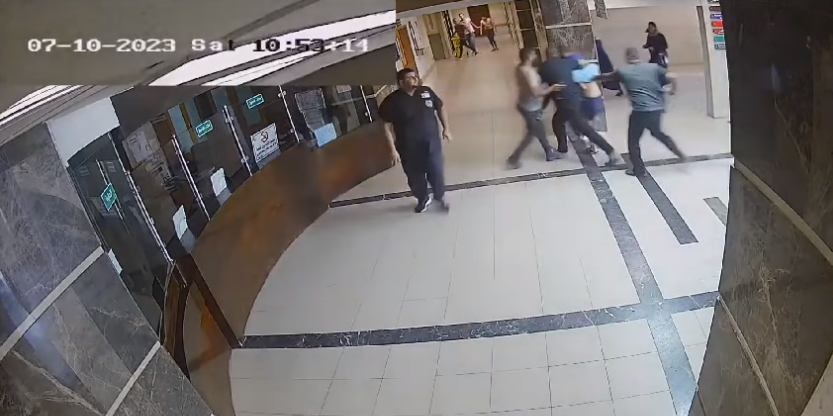
CCTV footage that shows Hamas bringing hostages to al-Shifa on 7 October.

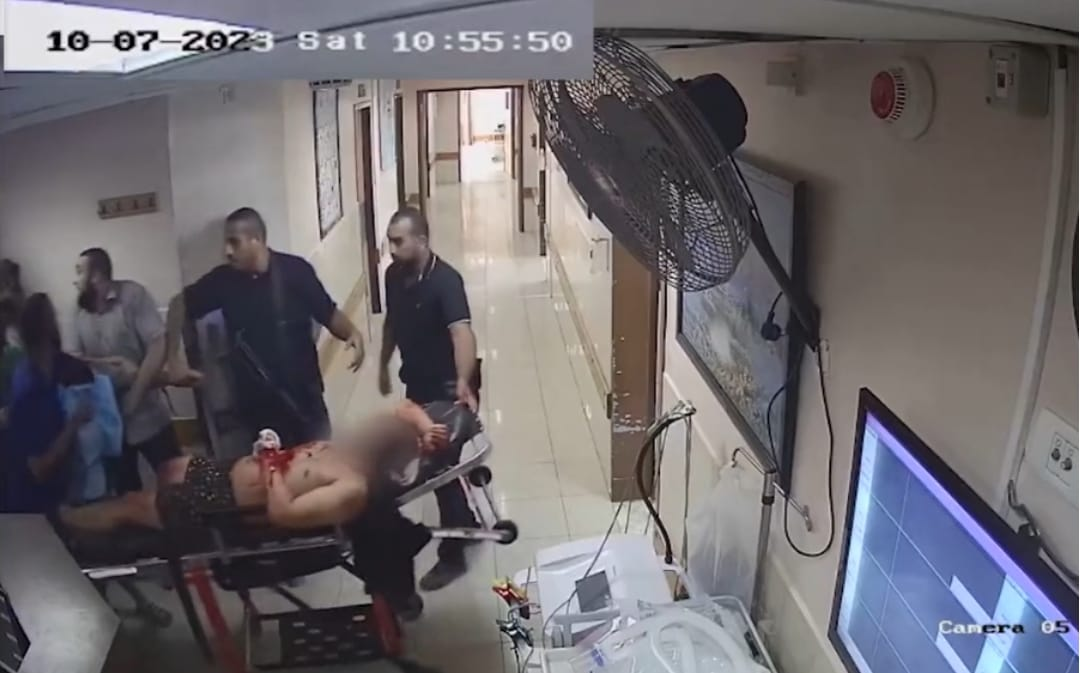
CCTV footage that shows armed Hamas militants with a wounded hostage within the hospital. Hamas dismissed the footage, stating that they had repeatedly taken captives to hospitals for medical care, "particularly because some had been wounded in airstrikes" by Israel. Hamas also stated that Israel's allegation of using Al-Shifa to detain hostages was "misleading and false," asserting that hostages were treated in hospitals.

The Atlantic's Mike Powell wrote that it was an "open secret" that Hamas was present at Al-Shifa hospital and that two Médecins Sans Frontières workers had said that there were units of the hospital they could not access which had armed guards.

The IDF released photos showing "Military uniforms, 11 guns, three military vests, one with a Hamas logo, nine grenades, two Qurans, a string of prayer beads, a box of dates". Former US State Department legal advisor Brian Finucane, said "These arms by themselves hardly seem to justify the military fixation on al-Shifa, even setting the law aside".

Following the release of the Israeli photos, Al Jazeera senior political analyst Marwan Bishara was skeptical, since Hamas left the guns and nothing else.

Mouin Rabbani, a Middle East analyst, stated to Al Jazeera, "Israeli forces have invaded Shifa Hospital and been inside it for 12 full hours – having refused any independent party to accompany them – and now we're supposed to believe that there were Hamas militants in there being pursued by the Israeli military but they somehow left their weapons behind?"

Israeli forces continued to search the facility for a second day, unearthing what they described as a tunnel entrance on the perimeter of the hospital complex, although they have not entered due to fear of booby traps. New York Times journalists visited the site and verified that a concrete shaft descending into the earth existed, and that electrical wiring and a ladder was visible, although they were not able to determine how deep the shaft was or where it led. The military said the search would take time.

Jeremy Scahill of The Intercept stated to Al Jazeera that the "Israelis have a multidecade track record of lying, of promoting false information, releasing doctored videos". He claimed regarding the evidence that he had seen more guns in the homes of Americans than in this purported Hamas Pentagon under al-Shifa Hospital. Netanyahu stated in an interview with CBS that the Israeli government had "strong indications" that hostages were in al-Shifa, which was one of the reasons they entered the hospital, adding that "I think the less I say about it, the better." On 16 November, the IDF reported that the body of Yehudit Weiss, a 65-year-old woman who was captured from Be'eri kibbutz, had been located in a structure nearby to the hospital. On 17 November, the IDF had discovered the body of 19-year-old Cpl Noa Marciano in a building next to the hospital.

Jeremy Bowen, BBC News' international editor, noted that there is no independent scrutiny inside the hospital, since journalists are working under the aegis of the Israeli military. He also stated that the evidence that was produced wasn't convincing enough to prove that "this was a nerve centre for the Hamas operation". On 17 November 2023, journalists for The Independent claimed that "Israel has not presented evidence that shows a large-scale headquarters under the hospital". CNN analysis suggested Israel had rearranged the weaponry before allowing press into the hospital.

On 19 November the IDF released footage down the tunnel shaft of what it claimed to be a Hamas tunnel network. The footage showed a tunnel shaft, which contains a winding staircase approximately three meters deep and it continues for seven meters down until it reaches part of a tunnel network. The tunnel continues for five meters before turning right and continuing for another 50 meters. At the end, there is a blast door and what the IDF says is a gunhole. Mounir El Barsh, the Gaza health ministry director, stated the Israeli tunnel statement was a "pure lie" and that the IDF had already been on the al-Shifa complex for eight days. Later that day, the IDF also published surveillance footage taken by the hospital's cameras, showing a group of men forcibly bringing two hostages into the hospital. Hamas responded by dismissing the footage, with senior political bureau member Izzat al-Rishq stating that they had repeatedly taken several captives to hospitals for medical care, "particularly because some had been wounded in airstrikes" by Israel. "We have released images of all that and the army spokesman is acting as if he has discovered something incredible," he added. Hamas further stated that Israel's allegation of using Al-Shifa to detain hostages was "misleading and false," asserting that hostages were treated in hospitals before being returned to their places of detention. The former hostage Ori Megidish said that she had been treated in the hospital, while another hostage who was brought to the hospital wounded was, according to her understanding, killed by a doctor.

On the same day, CNN visited the tunnel shaft and confirmed that a tunnel existed near the hospital, describing a substantial shaft descending 10 metres into earth that included a central column that looked like a hub for a spiral staircase; according to a video shown by the IDF, deeper in the shaft such a spiral staircase did exist. Both Hamas and health officials had denied that a tunnel network existed beneath the hospital.

On 23 November 2023, Israeli confirmed they detained the hospital's director Dr Mohammed Abu Salmiya as he evacuated patients to question the director about evidence that al-Shifa "served as a Hamas command and control centre", which he and Hamas have denied.

The Washington Post analyzed the publicly released material by Israel, along with satellite imagery and other publicly available material, and concluded that the rooms that were connected to a tunnel network showed "no immediate evidence of military use by Hamas", and that each of the buildings that the IDF spokesman Daniel Hagari had identified as being "directly involved" in Hamas's military activity did not appear to be connected to any tunnel network, and that there had been no evidence released that showed that a tunnel network could be accessed by any part of the hospital. Following the second offensive against al-Shifa which took place the following March, an Israeli colonel told the Washington Post that Hamas operatives had been working in offices and wards above ground in recent months, and that the use of tunnels had been less important. In a later article, the Washington Post reported that at the time, U.S. Senator Chris Van Hollen had received a classified briefing on the hospital and said that there were "important and subtle differences" between what the Biden administration was saying publicly and the actual intelligence on al-Shifa.

On January 2, 2024, U.S. intelligence confirmed its belief that Hamas used the Al-Shifa Hospital as a command center and to hold Israeli hostages, mentioning in an assessment that Hamas "used the al-Shifa hospital complex and sites beneath it to house command infrastructure, exercise certain command and control activities, store some weapons, and hold at least a few hostages." However, news reports the next day said that both Israeli and US statements are not considered as conclusive proof of Hamas use of al-Shifa.

On February 12, 2024, classified Israeli intelligence documents, obtained and reviewed by The New York Times suggested Hamas did store weapons and took cover at the hospital, using tunnels 213 meters long, twice the size previously known. The tunnels included bunkers, living areas, and computer and communications rooms, and established documents showed that Hamas masked its activities using the hospital. The Times also verified that the tunnel was under the surgery center. The article confirms that "The Israeli military, however, has struggled to prove that Hamas maintained a command-and-control center under the facility. Critics of the Israeli military say the evidence does not support its early claims, noting that it had distributed material before the raid showing five underground complexes and also had said the tunnel network could be reached from wards inside a hospital building."

On March 18, 2024, the IDF conducted an overnight raid into al-Shifa Hospital, saying that senior Hamas leaders had regrouped inside the facility and were using it to launch attacks. The IDF withdrew from the hospital on 1 April, stating that two Israeli soldiers and around 200 Palestinian militants were killed in the clashes, while 900 suspected militants had been arrested, 500 of whom were identified as members of Hamas and Islamic Jihad. The Palestinian Civil Defence stated that it had found at least 409 bodies of Palestinians killed in the hospital and the neighborhood it is located in after the IDF withdrew. The World Health Organization stated that at least 21 patients had died in the raid. Most of the complex was destroyed during the siege.

The IDF claimed they found bullets, grenades, and an assortment of other small weapons at the Al-Shifa Hospital, and other hospitals in the Gaza Strip. Combatants and civilians are allowed to be treated at the same shared facilities, and both groups of patients are protected. They do not disqualify the hospitals from protected status as medical facilities, it remains illegal to attack the hospitals and illegal to obstruct medical staff doing their duties.

In September 2025, the Times of Israel reported that the IDF released a video showing Hamas militants shooting from the hospital compound.

== 2023 Israeli media campaign ==
Before and after the 2023 Al-Shifa Hospital siege, the Israeli government engaged in a public relations campaign aimed at justifying its siege and takeover of the hospital. On 11 November, the Israeli Ministry of Foreign Affairs tweeted a video purportedly of a nurse at al-Shifa in which she backs up Israeli claims of Hamas usage of the hospital. The Nation described the campaign as propaganda, and stated that the video was widely mocked, with many Arabs questioning its authenticity, and the ministry deleting the tweet in a day. The Daily Beast, remarking on the video, said "Everything about it smacked of high school theater—from the botched accent that sounded like it was straight out of an Israeli soap opera to the perfectly scripted IDF talking points rolling off her tongue." France 24 found the video to likely be staged.

Some experts have said that questionable evidence such as claiming an Arabic calendar was a Hamas shift schedule, and displaying curtains as evidence that hostage videos were filmed has weakened Israel's credibility. British geopolitical analyst H. A. Hellyer stated "The irony is they might find something and nobody is going to believe them, at this point their credibility is shot." He added "We don't take seriously what a terror group says, but we do take seriously what an army says, especially one that's an ally of ours," he said. "So we naturally hold it to a higher standard." Muhammad Shehada, Euro-Mediterranean Human Rights Monitor Chief of Programmes and Communications, said of the requirements that Israel imposed on media outlets on their supervised tours of al-Shifa that the outlets have essentially agreed to broadcast propaganda, saying of the outlets "You are not allowed to speak to any Palestinian or Gazan to challenge what the IDF is spoon-feeding you. You are not allowed to go beyond the tour that the IDF has staged, so you stick to what the IDF wants to show you and where they take you. And you have to review the material with them before you publish, so that the result of that is not journalism. It's propaganda."

The head of the World Health Organization called the Israeli raid on the hospital "totally unacceptable".

Jeremy Scahill, in an article published by The Intercept, also referred to Israel's attempts to justify its siege of the hospital as propaganda. Noting that, before the siege, Israel had published animations purportedly depicting a sophisticated underground Hamas command and control center, Scahill opined that the evidence offered by the IDF after taking control of the hospital was unimpressive. Scahill observed that it was not a secret that there existed tunnels and underground rooms at the Al-Shifa Hospital complex, and added that Israel assisted in their construction and hired Hamas militants as guards to protect the contractors who worked on the underground facilities in the 1980s. Scahill said that remarkable evidence should be required of Israel and its supporters to demonstrate their remarkable claims and, failing that, they should be held accountable for the attacks on the hospital, which disproportionately affected wounded and sick civilians. On the other hand, Scahill wrote that Hamas should also be held accountable if it is shown that they did in fact use the hospital as a command and control center.

In October 2025, an investigation led by "+972 Magazine and Local Call together with the research collective Viewfinder, the Swiss network SRF, and the Scottish outlet The Ferret" said that the computer generated videos of al-Shifa were "one of the most notorious examples" of an Israeli military communication strategy. The investigation also pointed out that the video(s) in question re-used scenes from other, earlier videos, and included assets from commercially available asset packs.

== See also ==
- Gaza humanitarian crisis (2023–present)
- Attacks on health facilities during the Gaza war
- Human shields in the Israeli–Palestinian conflict
- Palestinian tunnel warfare in the Gaza Strip
- Use of human shields by Hamas
