= Yitzhar Hofman =

Israeli military officer

Rav seren Yitzhar Hofman
- יצהר הופמן
- Born: 1987; Eshhar, Israel
- Died: 31 January 2024 (aged 36–37); Tel al-Hawa, Gaza City, Palestine
- Cause of death: Fatal shot
- Military career
- Allegiance: Israel
- Branch: Israeli Air Force
- Rank: Major or a Rav seren
- Unit: Shaldag Unit
- Conflicts: Gaza war; Israeli invasion of the Gaza Strip; Insurgency in the northern Gaza Strip †; Al-Shifa Hospital siege

Yitzhar Hofman (Hebrew: יצהר הופמן; 1987 – 31 January 2024) was an Israeli Major and commander in the Israeli Air Force's elite Shaldag Unit.

He fought in battles with Palestinian militants in the northern Gaza Strip. Hofman was one of the leading Israeli special forces commanders who played key roles in the Gaza war. He was responsible for the raid on Al-Shifa Hospital in Gaza in November 2023, and he supervised the attack and siege on the medical compound.

On 31 January 2024, Hoffman was killed by a Hamas sniper, who fatally shot him with an Al-Ghoul rifle.
