= Faiq Al-Mabhouh =

Palestinian civil administrator (1968-2024)

Fayeq Abdel Raouf Al-Mabhouh
- فائق عبد الرؤوف المبحوح

Director of Central Operations of the Palestinian Police in Gaza

Personal details
- Born: 18 December 1968 Jabalia refugee camp, Israeli-occupied Gaza Strip
- Died: 18 March 2024 (aged 55) Rimal,
- Cause of death: Gunshot by IDF
- Party: Hamas
- Spouse: Married after 2007.
- Children: 2 sons (Ezzedeen and Mahmoud) and 2 daughters.

Military service
- Allegiance: Palestine
- Rank: Brigadier General
- Commands: Palestinian Security Services; Palestinian Police; (Palestine) Gaza Strip
- Battles/wars: COVID-19 pandemic restrictions.; Gaza war; Siege of Gaza City; Siege of Al-Shifa Hospital; Insurgency in the northern Gaza Strip; Blockade of the Gaza Strip; Israeli invasion of the Gaza Strip (2023–present)

Brigadier General Fayeq Al-Mabhouh (Note: The spelling of his name in English is extremely variable, including "Faiq Al-Mabhouh", "Fayek Mabhouh", and others. Many Arabic surnames start with an "Al" (Arabic: ال), this is sometimes omitted in English, but sometimes retained. The most common Romanisations of his first name are "Fayeq", "Fayek", and "Faiq", but there are numerous other ways, ending in Q, K, G, or CK, e.g. Faack. The Hebrew spelling is less variable (Hebrew: פאיק).) (Arabic: فائق المبحوح, romanized: Fā'iq Al-Mabḥūḥ; 1968–2024) was the Director-General of Central Operations in the Ministry of the Interior and National Security in the Gaza Strip. He was the leader of their crisis management team. His most notable recent responsibilities related to civilian disaster management, such as coordination and enforcement of restrictions during the COVID-19 pandemic.

Media reports varied in the way they described his role at the time of his death, but he was most often described as a police officer, militant or the head of the Hamas government's "internal security" forces. He was killed by the Israel Defense Forces (IDF) during a raid on Al-Shifa hospital.

== Duties ==
Mabhouh held the rank of brigadier general in the Hamas government's Ministry of the Interior and National Security. He was not linked to the current military activities of Hamas's armed wing, but he was one of the most influential people in managing the civilian activities of the Hamas government in the Gaza Strip. His specific duties at the time of his death are disputed.

The IDF claimed Fayeq Mabhouh, the police officer, who was killed during the Al-Shifa Hospital siege (see below), had been appointed to intimidate local Gazan clans in order to thwart them from cooperating with Israel on guarding the distribution of humanitarian aid, and accused him of "orchestrating" the execution of the leader of the Doghmush clan the week before he was killed. The clan allegedly denied this, and claimed the leader and his family were killed by an airstrike. Israel and Gaza's government were competing to win over the clans. It was rumoured that a large part of the Israeli motive for killing Mabhouh was the failure of the Israeli plan to replace the police in Gaza with the clans (such as the Doghmush clan) to distribute aid and enforce the law.

Palestinians said Mabhouh's current position was the head of police in the Gaza strip and had been helping coordinate for aid deliveries to the northern regions of the Gaza Strip. Palestinian media described him as the official responsible for coordinating with the tribes and the United Nations Relief and Works Agency for Palestinian Refugees (UNRWA) to bring and secure humanitarian aid into northern Gaza. Hamas released a statement that said that, the assassination came two days after successful efforts to bring 15 aid trucks into northern Gaza," and they accused the IDF of aiming to, "spread chaos and prevent aid from reaching Gaza City and the other northern governorates".

Sources told The New Arab (UK edition): "The occupation government had responded to the mediators earlier by saying that they did not mind the presence of some Palestinian police, with the aim of participating in the aid distribution process, but it seems that the occupation army was surprised by the level of organisation and the great success of the process of entering aid into the northernmost areas of Beit Hanoun and Jabalia, more than four months after aid stopped arriving in those areas, which prompted him to forcefully enter that line to prevent any presence that indicates administrative and field control by the Hamas movement".

=== Pandemic management ===
His other recent work included leading the Crisis Management Team in the Ministry of Interior during the COVID-19 pandemic. Fayeq played a prominent role in communicating with the public about the changing situation. He regularly appeared in video announcements on Al-Aqsa TV and social media channels, and gave interviews to local media to explain changes in restrictions. The Gaza Strip restrictions took the "flattening the curve" approach of slowing the spread of infections rather than preventing them completely. The restrictions imposed were similar to those imposed by most western countries, and much more relaxed than China, Australia, or other Western Pacific nations that maintained a zero COVID policy. They tried to avoid full lockdowns by implementing partial measures like weekend (Friday to Saturday) lockdowns and curfew, the Friday to Saturday lockdowns included mosques being closed for Friday prayers. But during times while the mosques were open, one creative measure initiated by Gaza's ministry of health was to replace the mosque preachers with doctors who gave health information seminars.

== Death ==
During an IDF raid on Al-Shifa Hospital in Gaza City, Fayeq Mabhouh was killed in what sources based on reports from the IDF described as a firefight between Hamas militants and Israeli troops. but many Palestinian aligned sources describe as an assassination. They mostly don't dispute that Fayeq fired on the Israeli forces who approached him, but they frame the situation differently as to who was the aggressor.

The raid was launched at approximately 2:30 am, by troops from the IDF’s 401st Armored Brigade and other units, including special forces and the Shin Bet security agency encircling the hospital.

Before the IDF found Fayeq (in or near the hospital) they raided his family home and kicked out his wife and children. Fayeq’s brother was captured in a neighbourhood near the hospital.

According to the IDF, Fayeq Mabhouh refused to surrender to troops and instead continued firing at Israeli security forces until he was killed. The IDF initially claimed to have killed 20 other "terrorists" alongside Fayeq. The IDF claimed that by the evening of Monday 18 March, their troops had killed 20 "Hamas" gunmen inside the hospital premises and another 20 were killed in the surrounding area.

Some sources suggest that the gun battle happened outside the hospital. The exact circumstances of his death are unverifiable.

They sides disagree on the implied or explicit purpose of removing Fayeq from power (and the war as a whole). Israeli-aligned sources frame it as removing a threat to Israel, but there is no indication that he has had any role in attacks on Israel while working as part of Gaza's civilian administration. Palestinian aligned sources described the goal as the destruction of Palestine, by starving the people, and preventing independent Palestinian control of the Gaza Strip. International sources often came closer to the Palestinian framing of the situation or present that version of events as more credible.

=== Response to his death ===
The Israel Arabic account of the Israeli Ministry of Foreign Affairs on the X platform announced the killing of Al-Mabhouh, describing him as, "the head of the Operations Directorate of the Internal Security Service of the Hamas terrorist organization."

Hamas released an extremely strongly worded statement, in which they claimed the killing of a civilian police officer was a violation of international law. It read, in part:

"This terrorist crime, by targeting civilian police protected under international humanitarian law, is further evidence of the Nazi enemy’s efforts to spread chaos, undermine societal peace in the Gaza Strip, and perpetuate the state of famine from which our people suffer, in implementation of the plan of a war of extermination and the displacement of our people from their land".

Arabic language social media speculated about the motives for the killing and the attack on the hospital, with comments such as, "The trucks passed over the past two days peacefully, without chaos, massacres, stampedes, wounded, or martyrs, but the criminal occupation does not like it." It was rumoured that a large part of the Israeli motive was the failure of the Israeli plan to replace the police in Gaza with the clans (such as the Doghmush clan) to distribute aid and enforce the law.

== Early life and family ==
Fayeq was born in Jabalia refugee camp, He had 13 siblings including Mahmoud al-Mabhouh, and another brother who was captured on the day Fayeq was killed. Their father immigrated to the Jabalia camp in the Gaza Strip from the town of Beit Tima (near Ashkelon) in 1948 during the 1948 Palestine war.

He joined Hamas as a young student, when they formed in 1988. His early work with Hamas included student protests, and pursuing drug dealers with a group focused on enforcing an Islamic ideal of morality. In 2007 he joined the civilian police force in the Gaza Strip. Like many members of Hamas, he could speak fluent Hebrew.

He was married, with two sons, Ezzedeen and Mahmoud, and two daughters, Yara and Juri.

=== 2010 assassination of his brother Mahmoud ===
Speaking about the assassination of his brother Mahmoud Al-Mabhouh the United Arab Emirates in 2010, Fayeq said, "He was very secretive about his work and kept his family life separate. He wasn't in battle or fighting yet the Israelis killed him. As a family we have the right to know who killed him and have lawyers in different countries working on it and when they catch the killers, we want them to be brought to court." He called on the Irish Government to expel the Israeli ambassador from Ireland, because the killers had used forged Irish passports. The assassins entered the UAE using fake or fraudulently obtained passports (some stolen from Israeli dual nationals) including passports from the UK, Ireland, Australia, France, and Germany. Israel attempted to deny responsibility, but this was widely disbelieved.

Fayeq said that Israel had targeted his brother Mahmoud at least twice in the past. Six months before Mahmoud's death, Fayeq claimed, Mahmoud was poisoned during a visit to Dubai and was unconscious for 36 hours. In 2004, the day Ezzedeen Sheikh Khalil (who Haaretz describe as "a senior Hamas figure also involved in arms smuggling") was killed in Damascus, security cameras in Mahmoud's home showed a bomb under his vehicle, and he escaped.

Fayek appealed to Sinn Féin (the political party in Northern Ireland) about his brother's death, "Ireland and Palestine have shared political experiences and I would like to thank the Irish people for your support especially your condemnation of Israel's war last year,"" (referring to the war in 2009).
