= Sebastian Haion =

Israeli military officer killed 2024

- Native name: סבסטיאן איון
- Born: 1973; Rosh HaAyin, Israel
- Died: March 19, 2024 (aged 51) Al-Shifa hospital, Gaza Strip, Palestine
- Buried: Nahariya Military Cemetery
- Allegiance: Israel
- Branch: Israel Defense Forces
- Commands: 401st Brigade
- Conflicts: 2006 Lebanon war: 2006 Gaza-Israel conflict; 2014 Gaza war; Gaza war; Al-Shifa Hospital siege †

Sebastian Haion (Hebrew: סבסטיאן איון; died March 19, 2024) was a Warrant Officer in the 401st Brigade and was killed at Al-Shifa hospital on March 19 trying to subdue a Palestinian militant.

== Military career ==
Sebastian was conscripted in the Israel Defense Forces when he was 18 years old and served in the second Lebanon war, the 2006 Gaza war, the 2014 Gaza war, and was killed in action during the Gaza war.

== Personal life ==
Sebastian Haion was born in Argentina and moved to Israel in his teens. He was the father of four children and lived in Rosh Ha'ayin.
