= Al-Shifa Hospital siege =

2023–2024 attack on and siege of a hospital in Gaza

- Part of the siege of Gaza City in the Gaza war
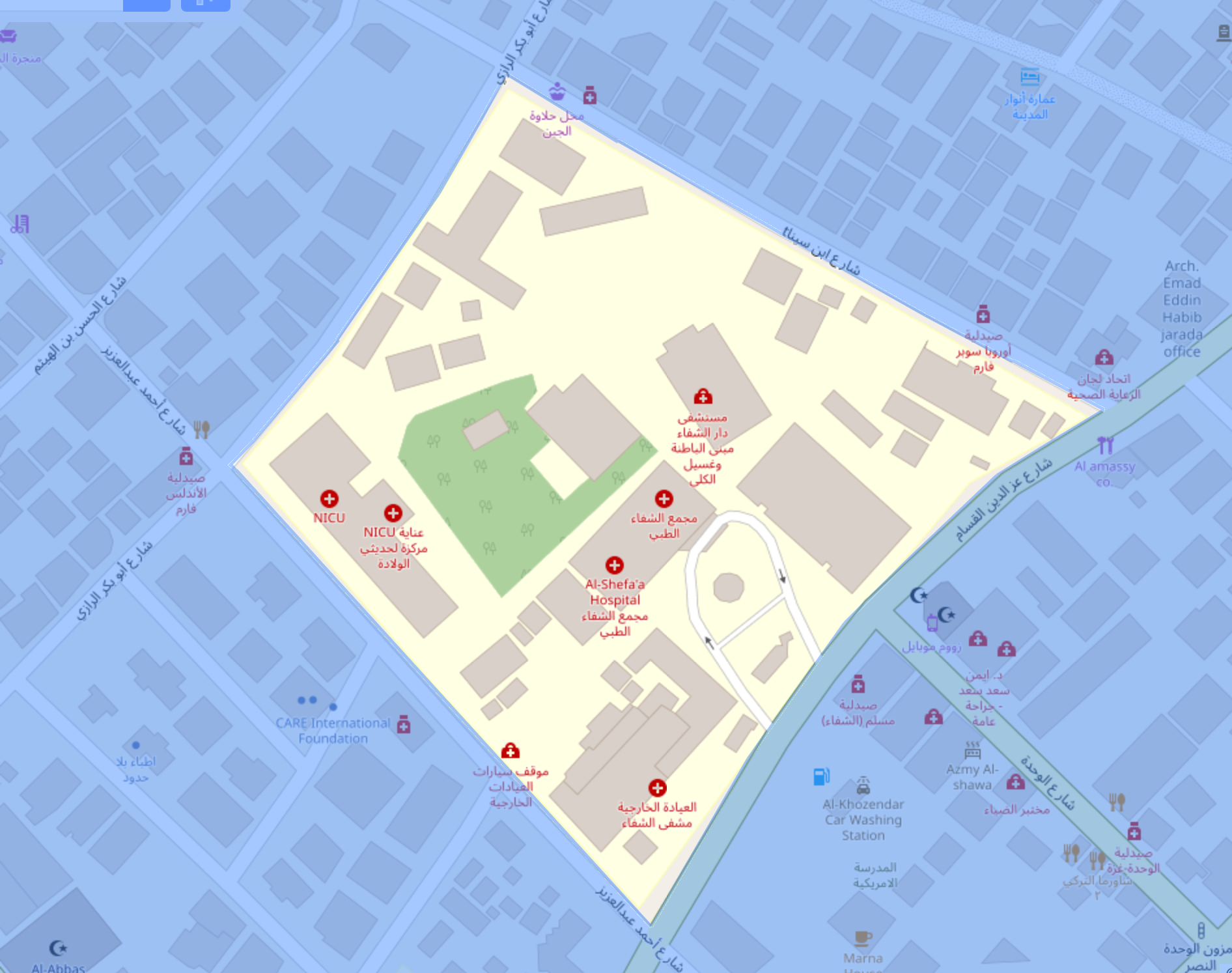
- The siege depicted on a map
Date	11–24 November 2023 (1 week and 6 days); 18 March 2024 – 1 April 2024 (2 weeks)
Location	Al-Shifa Hospital, Gaza City 31°31′27.5″N 34°26′34″E
Result	IDF raids the hospital on 15 November; Israel withdraws from Al-Shifa on 24 November; Israel raids the hospital again on 18 March 2024; Israel withdraws on 1 April after destroying 95% of the hospital

Belligerents
Israel	(Palestine) Palestinian Joint Operations Room; Hamas (Note: Hamas and the hospital workers have denied any armed presence at the hospital.); Palestinian Islamic Jihad; Al-Aqsa Martyrs' Brigades; (Palestine) Palestinian Civil Police Force

Commanders and leaders
(Israel) Yaron Finkelman (Israel) Itzik Cohen	(Hamas) Raad Thabet † (Palestine) Faiq al-Mabhouh †

Units involved
Israel Defense Forces; Israeli Ground Forces; 36th Division; 162nd Division; Nahal Brigade; 932nd Battalion; 401st Brigade; 98th Paratroopers Division; Oz Brigade; Duvdevan Unit; Israeli Combat Engineering Corps; Yahalom; Israeli Air Force; Shaldag Unit; Israeli Navy; Shayetet 13; (Israel) Shin Bet	Palestinian Joint Operations Room; al-Qassam Brigades; Al-Quds Brigades; Al-Aqsa Martyrs' Brigades

Strength
Unknown	1,000+ militants (Per IDF)

Casualties and losses
2 killed (Per IDF)	200+ militants killed, 500+ captured (Per IDF)
- 400+ Palestinians killed (per the Gaza Health Ministry); 21 patients killed (per WHO); 409 bodies recovered by the Palestinian Civil Defence

Al-Shifa Hospital, the largest medical complex in Gaza, was placed under siege by Israel in mid-November 2023 during the Gaza war, after saying it had contained a Hamas command and control center beneath it. The incident was followed by a second major raid by Israeli forces in March 2024.

On 11 November, the hospital was completely encircled, cutting it off from the rest of Gaza City. According to Gazan health officials, the hospital contained 1,500 patients, 1,500 medical workers and around 15,000 displaced people who were seeking shelter in the hospital. Both Israel and the United States have said that Hamas maintained command centers or command "nodes" below the hospital. Both the hospital's administration and Hamas denied that, with the former asking the international community to send security experts to verify the Israeli allegations. There were over 100 dead bodies placed in the courtyard and later buried by medical staff in a mass grave due to the siege. On 15 November, Israeli forces said they entered the hospital after killing militants outside, and that they had discovered a Hamas command centre, weaponry, and tactical gear.

After a media tour, The Guardian and CNN reported that the Israeli army had rearranged or doubled weapons for the tour and that an Israeli video showing the discoveries had been edited. NBC News said that Israel released several pieces of inaccurate or disputed information, which weakened Israel's credibility. Al Jazeera said that "many experts" accused Israel of fabricating evidence. On 22 November, Israel published video showing multiple tunnels beneath the hospital; The Wall Street Journal and The Guardian reported that this fell short of the original command center claims. Israel published surveillance footage taken by the hospital's cameras, appearing to show two hostages being taken into the hospital. The Guardian reported that Hamas had previously publicized taking hostages to receive medical treatment. On 21 December, The Washington Post published analysis concluding that the hospital buildings in question were not actually connected to the tunnels. On 2 January 2024, the United States released newly declassified documents showing that its spy agencies continued to express confidence that the hospital had been used as a command and control centre while providing no visual evidence, and the following day Israel announced that it had dismantled a tunnel beneath the hospital. News reports the next day said that both Israeli and US statements are not considered as conclusive proof of Hamas use of al-Shifa.

The raid on the hospital and Israel's limited findings of military infrastructure led to international criticism, including by UN High Commissioner for Human Rights Volker Türk who called for an independent investigation. International law prohibits the targeting of hospitals unless they are being used for a military purpose that is "harmful to the enemy", though the attacking force has to give civilians the chance to evacuate and there are strict rules of proportionality as to how force can be used. The use of hospital staff or patients as human shields is also prohibited. Jeremy Scahill accused Israel of waging a propaganda war to detract from accusations that its actions at al-Shifa constitute violations of international law. Medical staff at al-Shifa have accused Israel of directly causing the deaths of civilians being treated at al-Shifa, including prematurely born babies. The head of the World Health Organization said, "hospitals are not battlegrounds," and that Israel's action was "totally unacceptable." On 18 March 2024, Israeli forces conducted an overnight raid on Al-Shifa hospital following claims that senior Hamas officials had regrouped and were using the hospital "to command attacks". After a two-week siege that ended on 1 April 2024, the Al-Shifa hospital was mostly destroyed, and hundreds of dead Palestinians were found in and around the hospital, including in mass graves.

== Background ==
Since 2007, the Gaza Strip has been under blockade by Israel and Egypt. On 7 October 2023, Hamas attacked Israeli civilian communities and military bases, killing around 1,200 Israelis, the majority of whom were civilians, and taking about 250 hostages into Gaza. Israel conducted a counterattack. Israel also imposed a total blockade on Gaza, invaded the Gaza Strip on 27 October, and surrounded Gaza City on 2 November.

Al-Shifa is the largest hospital in the Gaza Strip; it was originally a British army barracks but was converted into a hospital in 1946.

Hamas's presence in the hospital during the 2014 Gaza War is disputed. Israel has stated that the hospital was a Hamas control and command centre, and The Washington Post reported it had "become a de facto headquarters for Hamas leaders, who can be seen in the hallways and offices." By contrast, doctors Erik Fosse and Mads Gilbert, who were working at the hospital, stated that they did not see any evidence of military activity at the hospital during the war. Professor Sara Roy stated that military use of the hospital was "highly improbable". Amnesty International reported in 2015 that Hamas had used abandoned areas of the hospital to "detain, interrogate, torture and otherwise ill-treat suspects" while the hospital was operational.

The Israeli military had ordered all civilians in the region to evacuate on 13 October. The IDF reported that Hamas was preventing the evacuation of civilians from the area and particularly from Al Shifa hospital, with the IDF stating that Hamas was using civilians as human shields.

The IDF again requested all civilians in Northern Gaza and specifically Al-Shifa hospital to evacuate on 9 November. Thousands of displaced civilians were sheltering in the hospital at the time of the attacks on 11 November.

=== Legal status ===
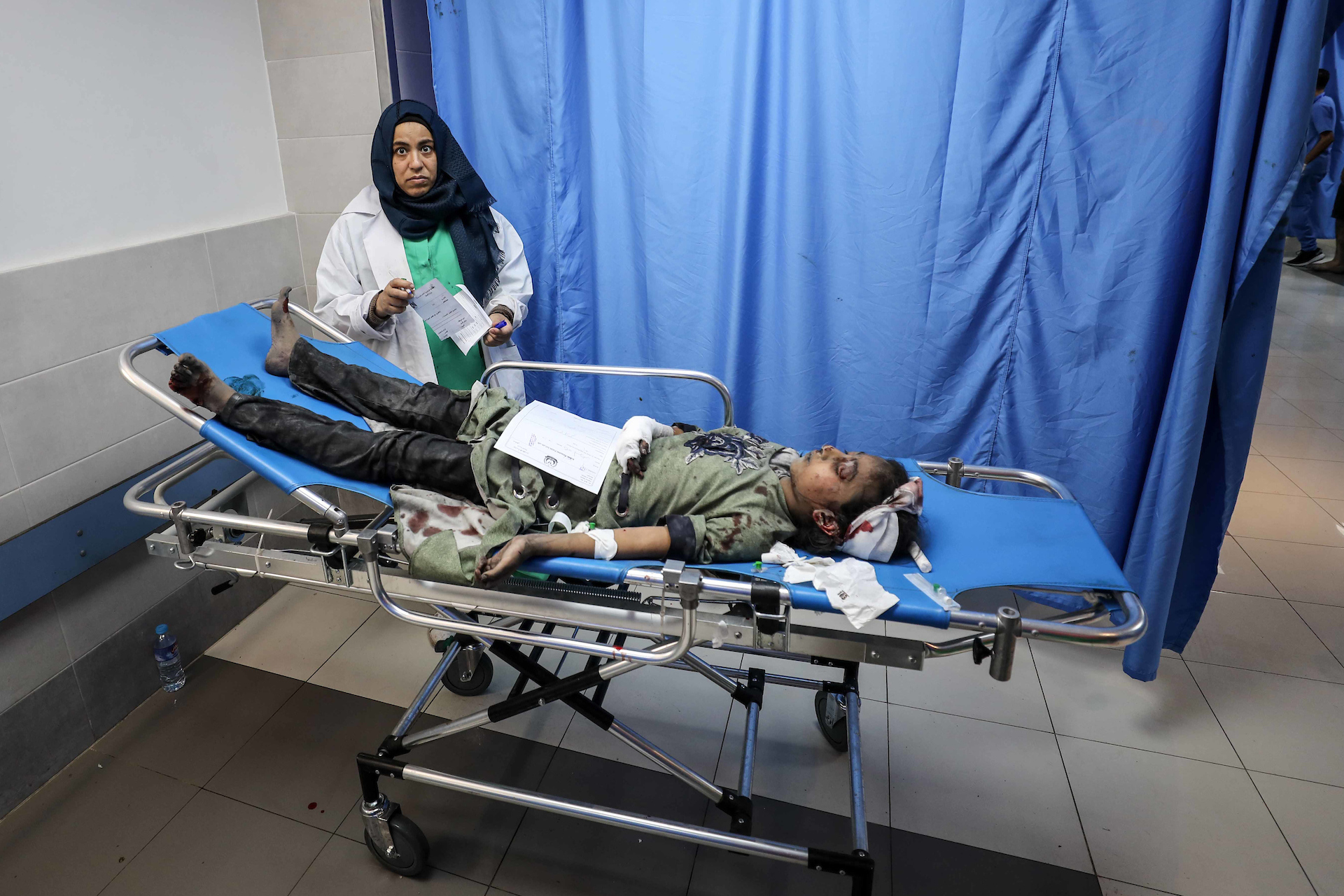
Wounded child at al-Shifa Hospital, October 2023

Under the laws of war, hospitals normally enjoy protected status, making it forbidden to turn them into a conflict zone. That status is lost if there is evidence that the hospital is being used to make an "effective contribution to military action"; examples provided by Israel in its 2006 Rules of Warfare manual where a protected civilian structure loses its status include an anti-aircraft battery on the roof of a school, or a sniper in a mosque. According to the International Committee of the Red Cross (ICRC), this rule "has few exceptions". The exceptions include "carrying or using of individual light weapon in self-defense or defense of wounded and sick; armed guarding of a medical facility; or the presence in a medical facility of sick or wounded combatants no longer taking part in hostilities", which do not negate protected status as a medical facility.

According to Israel and the United States, conclusive evidence exists that Hamas used the building for military purposes; Hamas denies this. According to the ICRC, if there is doubt about whether a hospital is being used for military purposes, it should be presumed not to be being used militarily.

It does not negate protected status if a hospital has "small arms and ammunition taken from the wounded and sick and not yet handed to the proper service", and there is also a narrow exception for the use of small firearms by medical facilities in war zones if "they use the arms in their own defence, or in that of the wounded and sick in their charge".

Even if there is strong evidence of military activity at the hospital that substantially exceeds these exemptions, strict rules that limit how force can be used still apply; civilians must be given the chance to evacuate, and civilians who remain in the building are still protected and cannot be targeted directly. Prior to the raid, Israel called for the evacuation of the hospital, but on 13 November doctors refused to do so, saying that they had to remain in order to tend to over 700 at risk patients. According to Hamas, civilians were unable to evacuate due to sniper fire and drone attacks.

== Initial clashes and siege ==
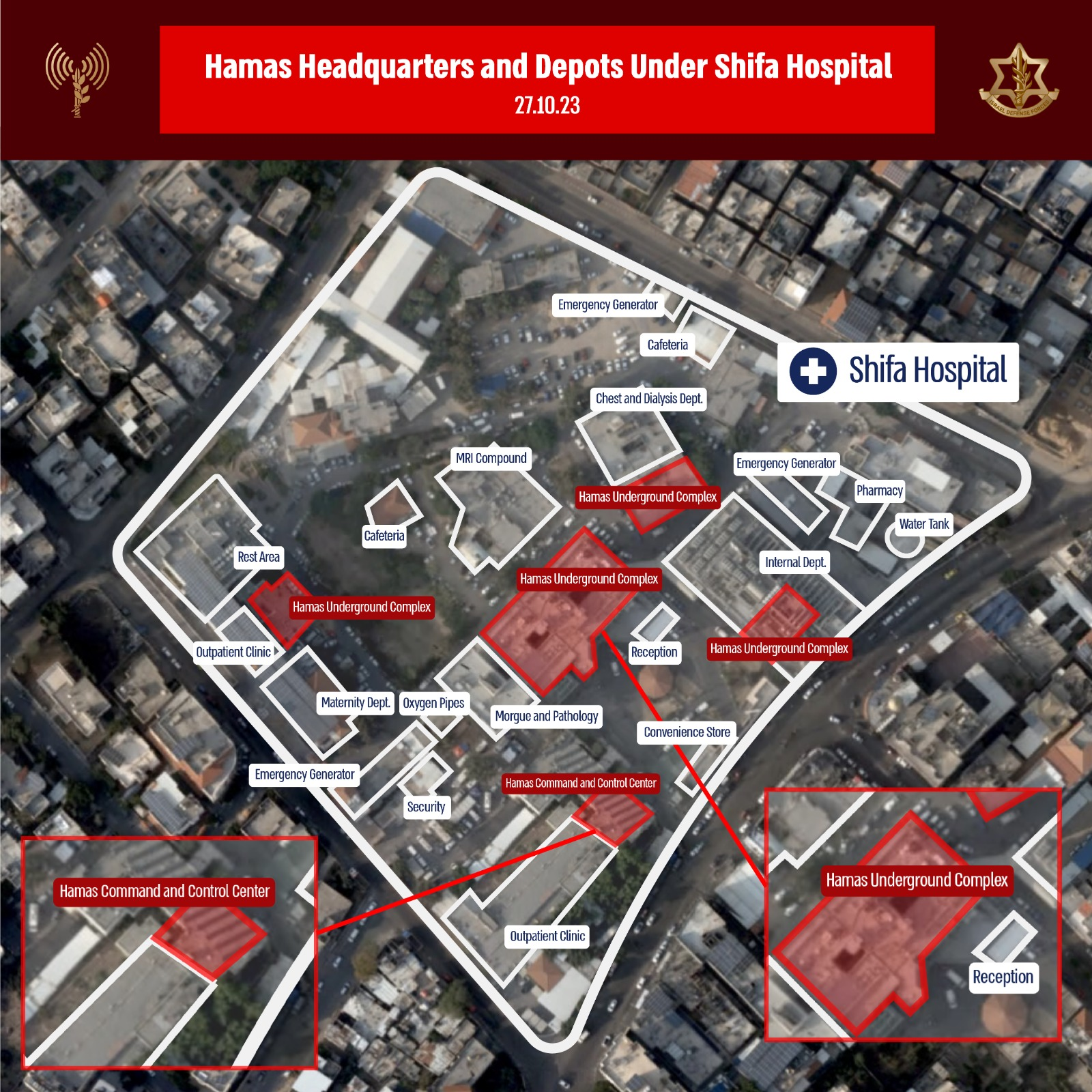
Map released by Israel alleging military use of the al-Shifa hospital compound

On 3 November, an Israeli airstrike targeted an ambulance convoy leaving the hospital. The attack killed 15 and wounded 60. Israel stated that Hamas was using the ambulances. Neither the Washington Post nor the Human Rights Watch found any evidence to support the Israeli statements. The Palestine Red Crescent Society (PRCS) stated that Israel had targeted Al-Shifa ambulances 7 times prior and had killed 4 of their personnel. On 6 November, Israeli forces struck and destroyed the solar panels atop the hospital, leaving it fully reliant on back-up generators powered by rapidly dwindling fuel supplies.

On 10 November, at least four strikes hit various areas of the hospital with various projectiles. Israel stated that at least one projectile was a misfired militant rocket, but did not elaborate further. The Gaza Health Ministry (GHM) stated that there were at least four strikes damaging parts of the hospital complex—two, at 2 and 8 am., hitting the maternity ward located on the upper floors— stating that 14 people had been killed. Later a Palestinian doctor stated that 7 people had died following the strikes. The next day, it was reported that Israeli forces were at the gates of the hospital. According to a follow-up investigation commissioned by the New York Times from experts who examined videos and remnants of the munitions, three of the projectiles fired at the hospital were Israeli.

On 11 November, the GHM stated that an evacuation was underway, that 50,000–60,000 people were sheltering in the hospital before, and that fewer than 3,000 people remained. Later that day, the PRCS stated that Israeli tanks were 20 meters away from the hospital. Doctors Without Borders (DWB) and the World Health Organization (WHO) stated that Israeli troops were shooting at those trying to exit the hospital, which Israel denied. Israel stated that they were letting people leave the hospital, which DWB denied. By this time, Al-Shifa ran out of fuel and had suspended some operations. As a result, 2 babies in incubators and two other patients died. The hospital director said that the hospital had electricity until the morning of 12 November, meaning that 37 babies in incubators are at risk of dying.

In a series of comments with The New Arab, Muhammad Abu Salmiya, the director of the hospital, said that the hospital was cut off from the rest of the city, trapping a reported 15,000 people inside. He also added that "patients were dying by the minute, victims and wounded were also dying, even babies in incubators."

The Israeli military denied it had placed the Al-Shifa hospital under siege, stating that there wasn't any shooting or siege, and that the east side remained open. On the same day, the WHO reported that it had lost contact with the hospital. The hospital director said that premature babies were in a 'precarious situation' and that they were transferred to an 'unhealthy location'. At this time, power was completely cut off in the hospital. Minister of Health Mai Al-Kalia stated that over 100 bodies were in the courtyard and that the medical teams were unable to make a mass grave in the courtyard due to the 'seriousness of the field situation.' She also added that 39 babies were at risk of death and that one baby died that morning due to lack of fuel. Stray dogs had also begun to "snap" and eat the corpses. Doctors in Al-Shifa Hospital reported snipers at the outskirts of the complex were firing at "any moving person".

A Hamas health official reported to Agence France-Presse that the cardiac ward was struck by Israeli air strikes, which was confirmed by witnesses but not by AFP.

On 12 November, Israel attempted to provide 300 litres of fuel to the hospital, which they say was blocked by Hamas. In response, a spokesperson for the health ministry stated that Al-Shifa needed 8000-12000 litres of fuel to run for a day, and that 300 litres would keep the hospital running for half an hour. Additionally, hospital staff noted there was no way to receive this fuel, as no ambulances were arriving at Al-Shifa and risk getting caught in crossfire, urging that the only way to safely access the fuel was with a pause in fighting.

On 13 November, about 50 people tried to evacuate from the hospital, but they said that Israeli forces fired at them, wounding one man.

On 14 November, a Gaza health official said that medical staff had buried 179 dead patients in a mass grave in the hospital's courtyard as the bodies had begun to decompose after the hospital's mortuary lost electricity. A witness reported "wild dogs" had been eating the unburied dead bodies.

=== 15 November raid ===
Just after midnight on 15 November, Israeli forces informed officials that they would shortly be raiding the hospital. Hospital staff reported sounds of clashes from outside the grounds, and Israel reported killing several Hamas militants outside of the grounds.

Following the raid, Israel stated that they had delivered supplies to the hospital, including medical supplies and baby food, and would provide battery-powered incubators to assist in transferring babies. There was no confirmation from Reuters regarding the incubators, and NBC was "unable to verify when the incubators might be delivered or how the Israeli army would get them to Al-Shifa amid the violence in the area". The IDF released a photo of a soldier standing beside boxes labelled as medical supplies and baby food and Reuters confirmed that the location was inside Al Shifa. Reuters reported the IDF said that three battery powered incubators were on standby outside Gaza. The IDF released a video showing them depositing at the front gate of al-Shifa 300 litres of fuel and a photo of a soldier loading mobile incubators. Israel also reported finding weapons and other "terror infrastructure" within the hospital; "concrete evidence", they said, of Hamas using the hospital as a "terror headquarter". According to the BBC, an Israeli official said that Israel had found weapons and terror infrastructure but did not immediately provide evidence.

According to a journalist inside the hospital, Israel was interrogating people within the hospital on Wednesday morning, including doctors and patients. According to a witness, Israeli forces fired a smoke bomb into the hospital that "caused people to suffocate", while a spokesperson for the Gaza Health Ministry said "The occupation army is now in the basement and searching the basement. They are inside the complex, shooting and carrying out bombings." Munir al-Bursh, the general director of Gaza hospitals, told Al Jazeera, "Patients, women and children are terrified."

=== 16 and 17 November ===
Netanyahu stated in an interview with CBS that the Israeli government had "strong indications" that hostages were in al-Shifa, which was one of the reasons they entered the hospital, adding that "I think the less I say about it, the better." On 16 November, the IDF reported that the body of Yehudit Weiss, a 65-year-old woman who was captured from Be'eri kibbutz, had been located in a structure nearby to the hospital. On 17 November, the IDF had discovered the body of 19-year-old Cpl Noa Marciano in a building next to the hospital.

=== Evacuation ===
On 19 November, the World Health Organization evacuated 31 premature babies while more than 250 critically ill or wounded patients remain trapped at the hospital. Doctors Without Borders said Israeli forces had on 18 November fired "deliberately" on a clearly marked convoy carrying 140 of the organization's employees and family members. More than 2,500 people were also evacuated.

== Alleged military use ==
There have been allegations that Hamas has been using the Al-Shifa Hospital for military purposes. Izzat al-Risheq, a Hamas official, denied allegations that the group was using Shifa Hospital as a shield for its underground military structures, saying there was no truth to the statements.

On 14 November 2023, the U.S. National Security Council spokesperson, John Kirby, said that the United States had its own intelligence sources indicating that Al Shifa hospital was being used by Hamas to run military operations and store weapons, which constitutes a war crime. The intelligence included communication intercepts of Hamas fighters inside the hospital complex.

Al-Shifa staff had appealed to the international community to send international delegations to the hospital to see that no military actions were taking place in the hospital.

In March 2024, The Washington Post reported that U.S. Senator Chris Van Hollen had received a classified briefing on the hospital and said that there were "important and subtle differences" between what the Biden administration was saying and the actual intelligence on al-Shifa. The Biden administration denied the Senator's statements.

=== IDF release of photos ===
The IDF released photos showing "Military uniforms, 11 guns, three military vests, one with a Hamas logo, nine grenades, two Qurans, a string of prayer beads, a box of dates" that they said was found in the hospital. Former US State Department legal advisor Brian Finucane said "These arms by themselves hardly seem to justify the military fixation on al-Shifa, even setting the law aside".

Following the release of the Israeli photos, Al Jazeera senior political analyst Marwan Bishara was skeptical, since Hamas left the guns and nothing else. Bishara added that Israel doesn't have any evidence that justifies "the genocide that they've carried out against Gaza and the bombings of the hospitals and other facilities and for the collective punishments."

Mouin Rabbani, a Middle East analyst, stated to Al Jazeera, "Israeli forces have invaded Shifa Hospital and been inside it for 12 full hours – having refused any independent party to accompany them – and now we're supposed to believe that there were Hamas militants in there being pursued by the Israeli military but they somehow left their weapons behind?"

Israeli forces continued to search the facility for a second day, unearthing what they described as a tunnel entrance on the perimeter of the hospital complex. New York Times journalists visited the site and verified that a concrete shaft descending into the earth existed, and that electrical wiring and a ladder was visible, although they were not able to determine how deep the shaft was or where it led. Investigative journalist Jeremy Scahill stated that the "Israelis have a multidecade track record of lying, of promoting false information, releasing doctored videos". He then stated regarding the evidence that he had seen more guns in the homes of Americans than in this purported Hamas Pentagon under al-Shifa Hospital.

Jeremy Bowen, BBC News' international editor, noted that there is no independent scrutiny inside the hospital, since journalists are working under the supervision of the Israeli military. He also stated that the evidence that was produced wasn't convincing enough to prove that "this was a nerve centre for the Hamas operation". On 17 November 2023, journalists for The Independent stated that "Israel has not presented evidence that shows a large-scale headquarters under the hospital".

=== IDF release of tunnel shaft footage ===
On 19 November the IDF released footage down the tunnel shaft of what it stated to be a Hamas tunnel network. The footage showed a tunnel shaft, which contains a winding staircase approximately three meters deep and it continues for seven meters down until it reaches part of a tunnel network. The tunnel continues for five meters before turning right and continuing for another 50 meters. At the end, there is a blast door and what the IDF says is a gunhole. Mounir El Barsh, the Gaza health ministry director, stated the Israeli tunnel statement was a "pure lie" and that the IDF had already been on the al-Shifa complex for eight days. Later that day, the IDF also published surveillance footage taken by the hospital's cameras, showing a group of men forcibly bringing two hostages into the hospital. The hostages were identified as two foreign hostages captured during the 7 October attack. Hamas didn't respond, but in the past they stated that they have taken hostages to hospitals for treatment.

On the same day, CNN visited the tunnel shaft and confirmed that a tunnel existed near the hospital, describing a substantial shaft descending 10 metres into earth that included a central column that looked like a hub for a spiral staircase; according to a video shown by the IDF, deeper in the shaft such a spiral staircase did exist. Both Hamas and health officials had denied that a tunnel network existed beneath the hospital. After inspecting the tunnel network, Haaretz reported that "The question of whether Al-Shifa's managers knew about the tunnels, the munitions and the military headquarters is answered the moment you go down into the tunnel with the IDF – one stretch is 170 meters long. There is no way the hospital administrators didn't know what was happening...The tunnels lead to well-lit, air-conditioned rooms that contain tables and beds. It's not clear if these rooms were prepared to receive hostages, but there is no doubt they were used by Hamas company, battalion and brigade commanders, and that fighting was directed from there in recent rounds, if not in the current war as well."

On 20 November, former Israeli Prime Minister Ehud Barak, referring to Israeli built bunkers from decades ago, told CNN "It's already [been] known for many years that they [Hamas] have the bunkers that originally [were] built by Israeli constructors underneath Shifa [which] were used as a command post of Hamas. And, a kind of junction of several tunnels are part of this system." According to Israeli officials, Hamas subsequently dug out the original basement, later adding new floors and connecting it as a hub within their existing tunnel system. A France24 investigation concluded that the images and videos of the tunnels published by the IDF were consistent with Hamas built tunnels. They also note that the tunnels were found under the Qatari building, which was built after Israel withdrew from Gaza.

The Washington Post analyzed the publicly released material by Israel, along with satellite imagery and other publicly available material, and concluded that the rooms that were connected to a tunnel network did not show any immediate evidence of being used by Hamas, and that each of the buildings that the IDF spokesman Daniel Hagari had identified as being "directly involved" in Hamas's military activity did not appear to be connected to any tunnel network, and that there had been no evidence released that showed that a tunnel network could be accessed from within the hospital's wards. The France 24 Observer analysis team was "unable to verify Israeli claims that the passage leads to a larger network of tunnels."

On 21 December, The Washington Post published an analysis concluding that the hospital buildings in question were not actually connected to the tunnels. On 2 January 2024 newly declassified documents by the United States showed that its spy agencies continued to express confidence that the hospital had been used as a command and control centre, while providing no visual evidence. The next day Israel announced that it had dismantled a tunnel beneath the hospital. News reports the following day said both the Israeli and US statements are not considered as conclusive proof of Hamas use of al-Shifa.

== Impact and casualties ==
The situation at al-Shifa Hospital is part of a serious healthcare crisis in Gaza. The hospital is rapidly running out of electricity, food and medical supplies. The last generator ran out of fuel, killing three premature babies and four other patients. By 19 November 2023, the hospital had no antibiotics or painkillers to treat its patients.

By 12 November 2023, two critically ill patients in the ICU had died because of a lack of electricity and oxygen.

According to a doctor at the hospital quoted in a 15 November 2023 BBC article, six premature infants had died, as had a critically ill adult burn victim. The doctor attributes these deaths to a lack of fuel for incubators, oxygen, and other essential medical equipment. Another doctor at the hospital, Ahmed Mokhallalati, said that 43 of the hospital's 63 intensive care patients had died because the intensive care unit ran out of oxygen.

The blockade has resulted in a humanitarian disaster, with numerous Palestinians seeking refuge in medical facilities. The toll on civilians, particularly children, has been extensive, with almost half of Gaza's hospitals shutting down due to acute fuel scarcity. The hospital has had to provide makeshift housing, and the absence of clean water and sanitation services is exacerbating the transmission of infectious diseases.

Amidst the siege, Hamas suspended hostage negotiations due to Israel's takeover of al-Shifa Hospital and heavy fire as Israeli forces approached the facility.

Gaza officials said an airstrike destroyed the hospital's cardiac ward, while a power cut shut down the neonatal unit's incubators where around 40 children were hosted and ventilators for others receiving urgent care.

On 19 November 2023, the 31 remaining premature babies receiving care at al-Shifa Hospital were transferred to Emirati Hospital in Rafah, escorted by the Palestinian Red Crescent and other health organizations. 28 of the babies were evacuated to Egypt on 20 November.

In July 2024, the Al Shifa hospital director was released from Israeli prison after spending seven months in detention.

=== Israeli media campaign ===
Before and after the siege, the Israeli government engaged in a public relations campaign aimed at justifying its siege and takeover of the hospital. On 11 November, the Israeli Ministry of Foreign Affairs tweeted a video purportedly of a nurse at al-Shifa who backs up Israeli statements regarding Hamas usage of the hospital. The Nation described the campaign as propaganda, and stated that the video was widely mocked, with many Arabs questioning its authenticity, and the ministry deleting the tweet in a day. The Daily Beast, remarking on the video, said "Everything about it smacked of high school theater—from the botched accent that sounded like it was straight out of an Israeli soap opera to the perfectly scripted IDF talking points rolling off her tongue." France 24 found the video to likely be staged. Subsequently, France 24, citing three experts, Michael Milshtein of Tel-Aviv University, Scott Savitz, an Engineer, and Daphne Richmond-Barak of Reichman University in Israel, found the Israeli-released footage of tunnels beneath Shifa hospital "do indicate that these tunnels have all the characteristics of tunnels that belong to the Hamas terrorist group."

Some experts have said that questionable evidence such as stating that an Arabic calendar was a Hamas shift schedule, and displaying curtains as evidence that hostage videos were filmed has weakened Israel's credibility, with H. A. Hellyer stating "The irony is they might find something and nobody is going to believe them, at this point their credibility is shot." Adding "We don't take seriously what a terror group says, but we do take seriously what an army says, especially one that's an ally of ours," he said. "So we naturally hold it to a higher standard." Muhammad Shehada, Euro-Mediterranean Human Rights Monitor Chief of Programmes and Communications, said of the requirements that Israel imposed on media outlets on their supervised tours of al-Shifa that the outlets have essentially agreed to broadcast propaganda, saying of the outlets "You are not allowed to speak to any Palestinian or Gazan to challenge what the IDF is spoon-feeding you. You are not allowed to go beyond the tour that the IDF has staged, so you stick to what the IDF wants to show you and where they take you. And you have to review the material with them before you publish, so that the result of that is not journalism. It's propaganda."

The New Arab, describing the ongoing propaganda campaign and how it has backfired with people questioning Israel's credibility, wrote that Israel had "resorted to fake audio, baseless claims and doctored imagery to whitewash its attack in Gaza." They discussed how the failure of the incubators in the Neonatal intensive care unit of al-Shifa caused by the denial of fuel deliveries by Israel and the cutting of electricity was responsible for the deaths of three prematurely born babies. Israel, while it had caused the fuel shortage and failure of the existing incubators, made a show of delivering new incubators to the hospital. However, the issue was not with the incubators, it was with the lack of fuel, an issue that was not addressed.

CNN reported on 20 November that video footage "suggests weaponry at Al-Shifa may have been rearranged", citing a 15 November video by the IDF showing only one AK-47 gun behind an MRI machine in the hospital, compared to later videos by Fox News and BBC showing two AK-47 guns at the same place; the IDF responded that the difference was because "more weaponry and terrorist assets were discovered throughout the day ... Suggestions that the IDF is manipulating the media are incorrect". The BBC also concluded that the number of guns behind that MRI machine had doubled in the separate videos, and additionally found that the IDF's video was edited, despite the IDF's claim that it was unedited.

Following Israel's release of video evidence on 22 November, the Associated Press, the New York Times, the Wall Street Journal, the Guardian, Sky News and Amnesty International all concluded that this did not constitute sufficient evidence to demonstrate the use by Hamas of a command center. Haaretz reported that "Hamas tunnels passing through the heart of the compound" prove that Hamas did use the hospital for military purposes.

== March 2024 siege ==
=== 18 March ===
On Monday 18 March 2024 at 2:30 a.m., Israeli forces began what they said was a "precise operation in the area of the Shifa hospital to thwart Hamas activity." The Gaza Health Ministry said the Israeli raid was a "massacre against the sick, the wounded, the displaced, and the medical staff inside al-Shifa Hospital". A survivor of the subsequent siege reported that hundreds of members of the non-military wings of Hamas and Palestinian Islamic Jihad (PIJ) who were employed in the hospital had gathered there inside to receive their salaries. He said they included members of Gaza's civil defense crews, police force, and internal security services. In a Mondoweiss report after the siege, the survivor stated, "There was a room in the specialized surgeries building that served as an office for the [Hamas] government branches that operated aboveground" and "another building that was an office for the [PIJ] movement, and the men employed by the movement would go there to collect their salaries."

The 18 March reports indicated the presence of tanks at the facility, and witnesses said there were substantial exchanges of fire around the area. Financial Times reported "gun battles" around the facility where thousands of people were sheltering as Israeli forces aimed to prevent Hamas fighters from regrouping in Gaza's north. The Health Ministry stated 30,000 displaced people were sheltering inside the hospital at the start of the raid and that anyone "who tries to move is targeted by sniper bullets and quadcopter". Footage from Sky News showed people around the hospital in distress following the raid.

Initially, IDF spokesman Daniel Hagari stated patients were under "no obligation" to evacuate. Later, Israel dropped leaflets ordering the hospital to evacuate. At the start of the raid, Wadea Abu Alsoud, a Palestinian journalist on the scene, stated the situation was "catastrophic" as the hospital came under heavy Israeli gunfire. Al Jazeera Arabic journalists stated Israeli forces opened fire in the hospital. Israeli military stated they were fired upon entering the compound and released drone footage it said showed its troops being fired at. A fire broke out in one of the buildings. Within minutes of their arrival, an IDF representative stated "they have conquered al-Shifa and everyone is under arrest."

Ismail al-Ghoul, an Al-Jazeera journalist at Al-Shifa during the raid, stated journalists were stripped naked, forced to lie on their stomachs, blindfolded, and interrogated after twelve hours. Witnesses reported journalists were beaten before being taken to an undisclosed location. Video from Israel's raid showed Israeli forces operating an armored bulldozer in the vicinity of the hospital, and the hospital's courtyard was bulldozed.

The raid caused the forced displacement of families from Rimal toward the central Gaza Strip. Tedros Adhanom Ghebreyesus stated the World Health Organization was "terribly worried" about the raid and stated "hospitals should never be battlegrounds". Israeli airstrikes around the hospital left residents searching for survivors with their bare hands, with a young boy stating to journalists, "For God's sake, I have nowhere to go... all my family were killed".

The IDF said that during the operation Faiq al-Mabhouh, "head of the operations directorate of Hamas' internal security service", was among those killed. Hamas' media office said Faiq al-Mabhouh was leading the coordination deliveries to northern Gaza with the UN and local clans. Two Israeli soldiers were also killed during the operation, and Daniel Hagari stated the Israeli forces had arrested 200 people during the 18 March raid.

=== 19 March ===
The New York Times reported that the 18 March operation set off a battle, with both Hamas and Israel reporting casualties. The operation drew condemnation from Gaza's health officials and questions about Israeli's state of control over north Gaza. The Associated Press reported heavy fighting around the hospital between Hamas fighters and Israeli troops in nearby districts, with explosions shaking the hospital and the surrounding neighborhoods.

=== 20 March ===
The raid was still continuing by 20 March, with Israeli forces encircled around the facility, preventing people from evacuating. The official Israeli and Palestinian narratives on 20 March differed drastically. The Israeli military stated that it had killed 90 gunmen. The Gaza Media Office stated all of the people Israel killed were wounded patients and displaced people, and that thirteen patients had died due a lack of medicine, oxygen, and food. Reuters stated they were unable to verify either account.

The bodies of people killed while attempting to flee the hospital remained on the street as gunfire continued. Extensive searches by Israeli troops were conducted in and around the hospital. Al Jazeera journalist Mahmoud Eliwa was arrested by Israeli soldiers at the hospital. According to Mads Gilbert, medical staff were detained, kept in the cold for hours, subjected to "humiliating investigations", and one doctor was shot in the chest while attempting to comply with Israeli forces' orders. A displaced person at the hospital stated, "The soldiers fired at the building where we are. They asked us to take off our clothes and go down to the hospital yard". CNN reported that witnesses saw Palestinian journalists and health workers blindfolded, handcuffed and stripped down to their underwear. The World Health Organization head stated, "Accessing al-Shifa is now impossible and there are reports of medical staff being detained". Ambulances were prevented from reaching the hospital.

The Gaza Civil Defense stated they were unable to reach wounded patients. Survivors of the raid stated they were stripped naked, detained for hours, and shot at despite carrying white flags. Footage of four-year-old Saja Junaid went viral, showing the severely burned girl forced to flee the hospital to Deir el-Balah, with journalists stating she hadn't eaten in three days.

=== 21 March ===
Al-Shifa's head of surgery stated that after being stripped, doctors had their faces scanned by the Israeli army and then were taken in one at a time for a "humiliating investigation". A man living near the hospital stated, "We are hearing the constant sounds of clashes, gunshots, shelling, bombing, quadcopters and planes all day and all night." The IDF said it evacuated 220 patients and emergency room equipment to another building, that "terrorists" had blocked themselves off near the emergency room, and that there was fighting.

Hani Mahmoud, a journalist on the ground, stated, "The Israeli military is now ordering everyone inside the hospital, including medical staff and patients, to evacuate immediately. Otherwise, the entire facility will be blown up." Local media reported that Israeli forces had blown up a specialist care building in the medical complex. Israel stated they had made 600 arrests, including dozens of top Hamas and Palestinian Islamic Jihad commanders.

=== 22 March ===
Tedros Adhanom Ghebreyesus, the head of the World Health Organization, stated the situation at Al-Shifa was "utterly inhumane" with nearly 200 staff and patients kept in a building with limited access to food and water, and critically wounded patients lying on the floor. The Committee to Protect Journalists stated it was "gravely concerned" about journalists arrested by Israel and stated the IDF "need to be fully transparent about journalists who have been detained and refrain from any attempts to block the work of journalists at al-Shifa Hospital and all of Gaza".

The Israeli army ordered the surrender of all people remaining in the besieged hospital. Verified footage showed Israeli bulldozers "wreaking havoc" on the hospital complex. Al Jazeera reported that "intense battles" had been "ongoing for days" in and around the hospital. The Gaza Health Ministry stated that Israel had bombed several hospital buildings and burned down its vascular department. After an elderly patient told the Agence France-Presse that he witnessed Israeli soldiers "beat all the young men and arrested them", the IDF stated it would "identify unusual cases that deviate from what is expected of IDF (army) soldiers".

=== 23 March ===
On 23 March, Hamas and the Palestinian Islamic Jihad said they were engaged in battles with the IDF outside of Al-Shifa Hospital and in the surrounding area. Hamas denied any presence inside the hospital. Reuters reported Israeli troops still searching the complex, with Israeli military saying that the hospital is linked to a network of tunnels used as a Palestinian militant base. As of 23 March, Israel stated they killed over 170 gunmen inside the hospital grounds. Hamas said that all those killed were either patients or displaced individuals. The Gaza Health Ministry stated that five wounded patients were trapped in the hospital and had gone six days without water, food, or medicine.

=== 24 March ===
The IDF stated it had killed 170 people and arrested more than 800 in total. The IDF said that intelligence forces had started interrogation of some of the detainees and that those not found to have militant group affiliations were released. Doctors Without Borders staff stated that "heavy air strikes by Israeli forces and fierce fighting" were "endangering patients, medical staff and people trapped inside". Gaza's government media office stated five medical staff were killed by Israeli soldiers.

=== 25 March ===
Jameel al-Ayoubi, a displaced person sheltering at the hospital, told the Associated Press he had seen Israeli tanks drive over the bodies of four people killed in the raid. IDF Spokesman Daniel Hagari stated that Hamas had fired mortars from Shifa's emergency room and maternity ward, as well as thrown explosives from the burn ward.

=== 26 March ===
The Gaza Health Ministry stated that people in the hospital's Human Resources Department had been arrested.

=== 27 March ===
A resident living 1 km from the hospital stated, "Explosions never stop, we see lines of smoke coming from inside, no one moves even in streets that are hundreds of metres away because of Israeli snipers on rooftops of buildings." Verified footage showed a family evacuated from near al-Shifa stating, "We raised the white flag as the tank was next to our house and they started shelling at us". Moath al-Kahlout, a journalist in northern Gaza, stated, "Patients and medical staff are stuck in a small room inside the human resources development building, which is not at all equipped to provide medical care."

=== 28 March ===
CNN reported that according to one anonymous eyewitness an estimated 400 to 500 Hamas and Islamic Jihad members and their families arrived at the hospital in mid-March, with some appearing to be members of Hamas' political branch while others were armed. CNN was unable to verify the numbers independently.

The Gaza media office stated that preliminary information suggested Israeli forces had killed 200 displaced people inside the hospital. The Gaza Civil Defence stated 65 of its staff had been killed in the vicinity of al-Shifa. Hani Mahmoud, a journalist in Gaza, stated, "An entire residential neighbourhood near the hospital... has been destroyed, rendered beyond recognition." Local media reported that journalist Muhammad Abu Sakhil was killed by Israeli forces in al-Shifa.

=== 30 March ===
Gaza's media office stated 400 people had been killed by Israeli forces during the raids, calling the attack a war crime. The World Health Organization stated it needed to postpone a joint mission to al-Shifa, after Israel denied three previous missions to the hospital. Gaza's health ministry stated Israel was preventing patient evacuations.

=== 31 March ===
The World Health Organization stated 21 patients had died since the start of Israel's raid. The IDF said that it had found weapons hidden in patients' pillows and beds in Al-Shifa's maternity ward, as well as in the hospital's ceilings and walls.

=== 1 April ===
Israeli forces withdrew from the hospital, leaving it with blown out windows and blackened concrete walls. Al-Aqsa Martyrs Brigades said it had targeted Israel's forces with artillery during the Israeli military operation and withdrawal. An Israeli official said that militants did not come in through tunnels, which had been mostly destroyed in 2023, but had traveled in with civilians, collecting guns that were concealed around the hospital or from private homes.

=== Aftermath ===
On 2 April 2024, a World Health Organization spokesman stated that they had contact with Al-Shifa's staff and that, "The directors told us that Al Shifa Hospital is gone. It's no longer able to function in any shape or form as a hospital". On 3 April, an UNOCHA flash update cited WHO, stating, "Al Shifa Hospital is now in ruins and no longer able to function as a hospital". On 5 April 2024, a WHO-led mission visited Al-Shifa to perform an initial evaluation of the extent of destruction and to determine needs to guide efforts to restore the facility in the future. The team found most of the buildings largely damaged or destroyed and most of the equipment unusable or burned to ashes. They found explosives and fire had significantly damaged the emergency department, surgical, and maternity ward buildings. The mission said that the destruction had left the facility non-functional; short-term restoration of minimal functionality seemed implausible and would require efforts to evaluate and clear the grounds for unexploded military devices.

On 6 April 2024, a report by NPR found: "Bodies lay decomposing in the hospital's dirt courtyard, which was laden with unexploded ordnance. Other people were shot and left to die in its hallways, maimed and crushed by tanks outside its gates, decomposing on side streets and in buildings." NPR stated there was "no clarity" on how many of the dead were civilians or fighters. Doctors Without Borders stated, "Gaza's largest hospital is now out of service. Given the extent of the destruction, people in the north are left with even fewer healthcare options." According to Wafa, hundreds of dead civilians were found at al-Shifa. A nurse at the hospital stated, "The smell of corpses filled the place. What happened to us is indescribable." Mondoweiss reported that "the Israeli army shot patients in their beds" as well as doctors and "hundreds of civil government employees".

Moath al-Kahlout, an official of Gaza's Civil Defence, stated that buildings and medical machines had been "totally destroyed". Al Jazeera Arabic reported, "Buildings in all departments have been burned, and the structure of the complex has been damaged from the inside". The hospital director stated, "All the buildings of al-Shifa medical complex were completely destroyed and burned. Al-Shifa medical complex is gone forever." On 9 April, Gaza Civil Defense spokesperson Mahmoud Basal said that least 381 bodies were recovered within and around the complex since April 1, excluding people buried in the hospital grounds. Mass graves were also found around the hospital. On 15 April, medical crews stated that they had recovered 15 bodies from around the hospital. Israeli forces said that "approximately 500 suspects affiliated with terrorist organizations were apprehended and 200 terrorists were eliminated."

=== False rape allegations ===
On 24 March, Al Jazeera released what were later revealed to be false rape allegations. Al Jazeera reported a story on its liveblog entitled, "Israel forces raped, killed women during raid on al-Shifa, witness says." Al Jazeera's update used statements of a witness, Jamila al-Hissi (also transliterated as Jamila Al-Hessi), who stated that "They raped women, kidnapped women, executed women, and pulled dead bodies from under the rubble to unleash their dogs on them." Al Jazeera reported that al-Hissi described the situation as a "war zone" and had been trapped in a building near the hospital. Al-Hissi's statement was also reported by Middle East Eye, Morocco World News and The New Arab.

Iran's Foreign Ministry Spokesman, Nasser Kanaani, called for a fact-finding mission on sexual violence at Al-Shifa.

On 25 March, Al Jazeera first took down its video of Jamila al-Hissi's statements and later the written article. Former managing director of Al Jazeera, Yasser Abu Hilalah, wrote on X, "Hamas investigations revealed that the story of the rape of women in Shifa Hospital was fabricated." Abu Hilalah reported that al-Hissi "justified her exaggeration and incorrect talk by saying that the goal was to arouse the nation's fervor and brotherhood."

=== Execution allegations ===
Al Jazeera and the Euro-Mediterranean Human Rights Monitor, a Geneva-based human rights organization, stated that Israel's raid had "resulted in the deaths of over 200 Palestinians, including civilians. Many were deliberately killed or executed extrajudicially after arrest". Al Jazeera English reported witnesses describing "executions" at Al Shifa. The Euro-Med Monitor stated that at least thirteen children had been killed in the area near the hospital or while attempting to flee the area with their families. The organization stated that Israeli forces had shot and executed them. White House spokeswoman Karine Jean-Pierre stated the U.S. had not verified footage of executions around Al-Shifa but said, "It is deeply concerning if it's true. We are reaching out to Israel's government to get more information". The Palestinian Red Crescent Society reported departments at the hospital being set on fire, and stated, "According to eyewitness accounts and official reports, many of the civilians were executed. They were killed by the Israeli occupation forces including medical staff, doctors and nurses, they were purposefully executed by the Israeli soldiers".

Adnan al-Bursh, the head of orthopaedics department at the hospital, died on 19 April while in the custody of the Israel Prison Service (IPS). The Commission of Detainees and Ex-Detainees Affairs and the Palestinian Prisoners Society accused Israel of torturing him to death, while Ghassan Abu Sittah alleged that al-Bursh was beaten to death by prison guards. An IPS spokesman told Reuters that they would investigate the circumstances of his death.

=== Statements ===
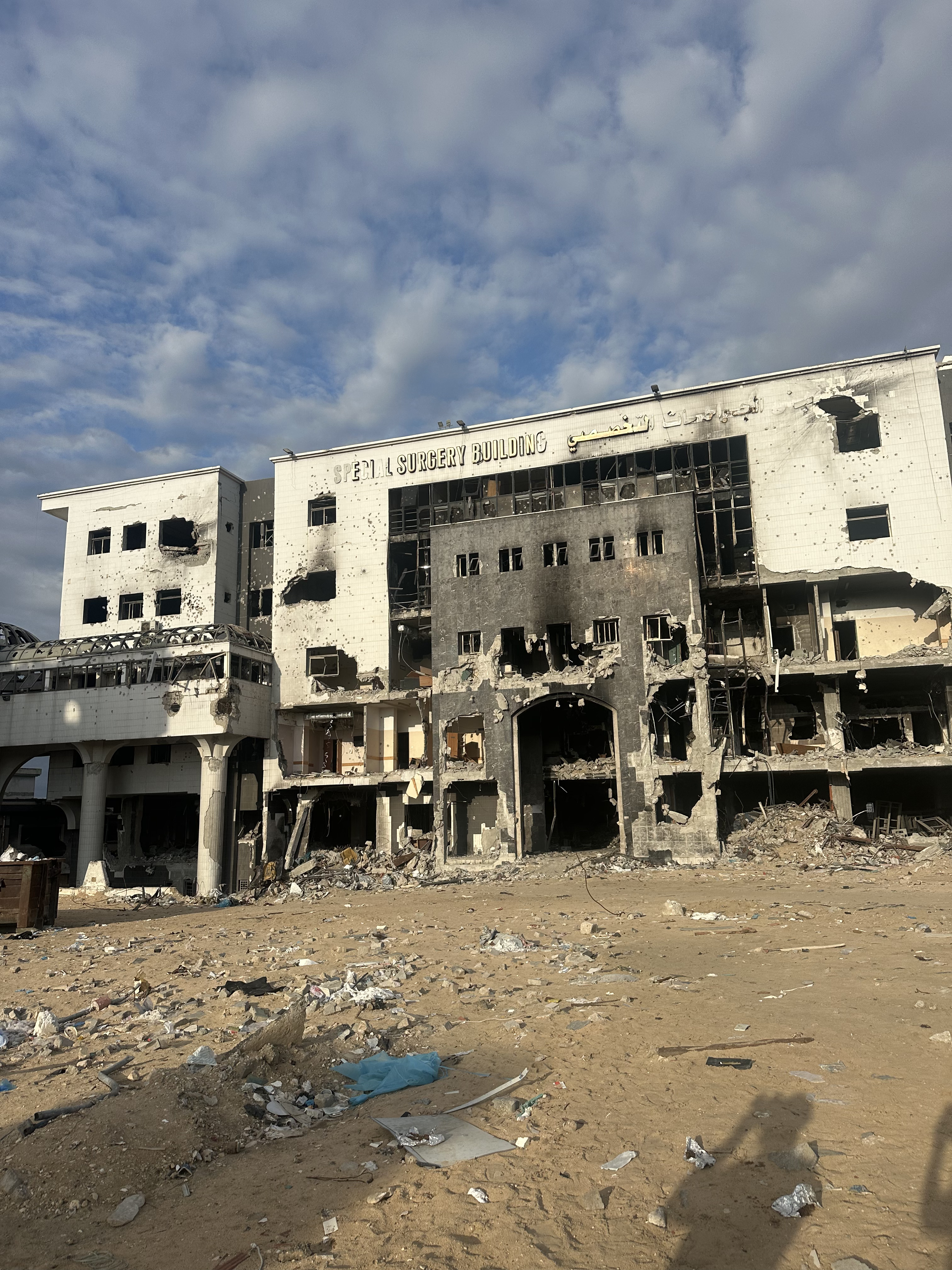
Al-Shifa Hospital in Gaza City, destroyed by Israeli army, December 21, 2024

Israel stated its operation was to clear Al-Shifa hospital of militants operating there.

The Gaza Media Office said the raid constituted a war crime. The Euro-Mediterranean Human Rights Monitor stated it had collected witness testimonies that young men were being used as human shields by the Israeli army. Al Jazeera English stated that there were reports that Israel had committed "heinous" war crimes during the siege.

Hamas denied operations from Al-Shifa. Hamas' military wing said it had fought with IDF forces around the hospital and released footage of fighting. Palestinian Islamic Jihad also published footage of its fighters engaged in battles with Israeli forces near the hospital. Witnesses inside and near the hospital denied seeing militants.

== Mass graves ==
On 14 November 2023, officials at Al-Shifa hospital announced that to date they had buried 179 bodies in a mass grave in the courtyard of the hospital. A week later, Palestinians buried dozens of unidentified bodies taken from Al-Shifa hospital and the Indonesian hospital in a mass grave in Khan Yunis.

In April 2024, health workers in Gaza exhumed the first bodies from mass graves at Al-Shifa Hospital in Gaza City, where, according to a Gaza Civil Defense spokesperson, at least 381 bodies were found after the withdrawal of Israeli forces, not including persons buried within the hospital grounds. The Office of the United Nations High Commissioner for Human Rights (OHCHR), stated that "Among the deceased were allegedly older people, women, and the wounded, while others were found tied and stripped of their clothes."

On 8 May, the Gaza Media Office stated a third mass grave had been found at al-Shifa, with some of the bodies found without heads, raising concerns about possible war crimes. In a statement, the director of the Gaza Emergency Operations Centre said, "The bodies we found were on beds at the reception and emergency department, meaning Israel destroyed the department over the heads of sick and injured people – and they were buried alive."

== Reactions ==
=== Government ===
China has described the struggling hospital as a manifestation of the humanitarian crisis in Gaza. The Palestinian Minister of Health, Mai al-Kaila, described Israeli actions as a "crime against humanity." Israel disputes this, stating that it does all it can to protect civilian life, and that it is Hamas that puts civilians in harms way by blocking their evacuation from combat zones. US President Joe Biden stated Gaza's hospitals "must be protected." Biden accused Hamas of committing a war crime by allegedly having its headquarters under al-Shifa Hospital, with The Nation noting that Biden appeared "unfazed by the flimsiness" of Israel's "ludicruous propaganda".

Prime Minister of Canada Justin Trudeau stated, "Even wars have rules... I urge the government of Israel to exercise maximum restraint... The world is witnessing this, the killing of women and children, of babies. This has to stop." Ayman Safadi, the Jordanian Minister of Foreign Affairs, condemned the attack, stating, it was a "violation of international humanitarian law, especially the 1949 Geneva Convention relative to the Protection of Civilian Persons in Time of War." Qatari foreign minister, Mohammed bin Abdulrahman bin Jassim Al Thani, stated the siege was a "war crime and a blatant violation of international laws." The Saudi Arabian foreign ministry stated it "strongly condemns the Israeli occupation forces' storming of al-Shifa Hospital in Gaza."

=== Academics ===
H. A. Hellyer, a fellow at the Carnegie Endowment for International Peace, stated a huge trust deficit remained regarding Israeli intelligence, and that Israeli statements should not be taken at "face value." Sultan Barakat, a professor at Hamad Bin Khalifa University in Qatar, stated US and Israeli information on Gaza was not reliable. Osamah Khalil, a professor at Syracuse University in New York, deemed it improbable that Hamas would have a base at Al-Shifa, as the hospital was one of the busiest places in Gaza.

=== Media ===
Antony Loewenstein noted Israel has a long history of "deliberately targeting medical facilities in the West Bank, East Jerusalem and Gaza," and that IDF statements about military facilities needed to be "treated with deep scepticism." Palestinian analyst Thabet Al-Amour stated, "This is madness, absolute madness... It's a hospital." Al Jazeera journalist Hamdah Salhut stated Israel had not shown "solid proof, or evidence" to back up their statements. Major-General Giora Eiland, former head of the Israeli National Security Council, stated that targeting the hospital was tactical,- aiming to control the narrative about Hamas rather than serving a strategic purpose. An analysis by The Washington Post found Israel's evidence "falls short" of proving the hospital was a command-and-control centre.

=== Organizations ===
The World Health Organization (WHO) confirmed that Al-Shifa Hospital is without electricity, putting patients, including children, at risk of death. WHO director-general Tedros Adhanom Ghebreyesus said on social media that al-Shifa had been without water for three days and was "no longer functioning as a hospital". Doctors Without Borders reported that an ambulance and the patients inside were attacked near the hospital. A spokesman for the International Red Cross and Red Crescent Movement stated, "I cannot even imagine ... the panic among the patients, the panic among doctors and nurses. What they're [going] through is really something that is unbelievable."

A group of Israeli doctors, known as Doctors for the Rights of Israeli Soldiers, has signed a statement advocating the bombing of Al-Shifa hospital. The statement was publicly signed by dozens of Israeli doctors and was widely shared on various social media platforms. The doctors stated that it was Israel's "legitimate right" to bomb al-Shifa hospital because it served as a base for "Palestinian armed groups". Alice Rothchild, the director of Jewish Voice for Peace, stated noted Israel's lack of hard evidence of military operations at al-Shifa, stating, "Israeli sources have a long history of not being very accurate."

== See also ==
- Attacks on health facilities during the Gaza war
- Executions and assassinations during the Gaza war
- Gaza Strip mass graves
- Al-Ahli Arab Hospital explosion
