= H. A. Hellyer =

British scholar in geopolitics, security studies and political economy

H.A. Hellyer FRHistS FRSA
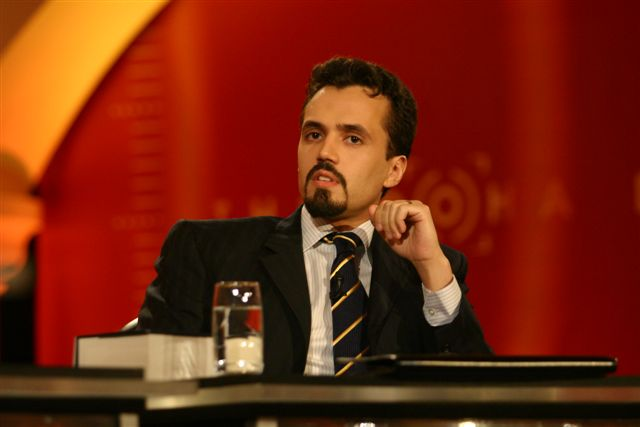
- H.A. Hellyer, speaking on the BBC's 'Doha Debates'
- Citizenship: British
- Occupations: Scholar, geopolitical analyst
- Years active: Over 20 years

Academic background
- Education: University of Warwick; University of Sheffield

Academic work
- Discipline: International Relations; Security Studies; Political Economy; Religion
- Institutions: Royal United Services Institute; Center for American Progress; Brookings Institution; Carnegie Endowment for International Peace; Atlantic Council; University of Warwick; American University in Cairo; Institute for Strategic and International Studies (Malaysia)
- Notable works: Muslims of Europe: The "Other" Europeans; A Revolution Undone: Egypt's Road Beyond Revolt; A Sublime Way: The Sufi Path of the Sages of Makka
- Website: www.hahellyer.com

H. A. Hellyer is a British geopolitical analyst and scholar specializing in security studies, political economy, history, and belief. His work spans over 20 years across governmental, academic, and corporate advisory roles, focusing on the Middle East, Southeast Asia, and Western contexts.

He is currently a senior associate fellow in Defence and Security Studies at the Royal United Services Institute (RUSI) in London, and a senior fellow in Geopolitics and Security at the Center for American Progress in Washington, DC.

Previously, Hellyer held fellowships and research roles at the Brookings Institution, Carnegie Endowment for International Peace, Atlantic Council (Center for the Middle East), and the Institute for Strategic and International Studies in Malaysia. He has also held academic posts including visiting professor of law at the American University in Cairo, and visiting fellowships at Cambridge University, Harvard Kennedy School, University of Warwick, and the University of Technology Malaysia.

Hellyer was Deputy Convenor of the UK Government's Taskforce on Tackling Radicalisation and Extremism following the 2005 London bombings. He was also the UK Foreign and Commonwealth Office's first Economic and Social Research Council (ESRC) fellow, working within the Islam and counter-terrorism teams.

He holds a law degree from the University of Sheffield, an advanced degree in international political economy, and a PhD in social sciences from the University of Warwick as an ESRC scholar.

Hellyer is an elected Fellow of the Royal Historical Society (FRHistS) and the Royal Society of Arts (FRSA), and is an honoree member of the Diversity in National Security Network. He is widely published with seven books, over 20 book chapters and articles, and has appeared in major media outlets including CNN, BBC, and has contributed op-eds to the Washington Post, New York Times, Guardian, Foreign Policy, and Financial Times.

== Early life and education ==
Hellyer was raised between the UK and the Middle East.

== Career ==
After completing his PhD at the University of Warwick, Hellyer was appointed Fellow there. He served as Deputy Convenor of the UK Taskforce on Tackling Radicalisation and Extremism established after the 2005 London bombings.

Hellyer has contributed extensively to policy research through his roles at RUSI, Brookings Institution, Carnegie Endowment, Atlantic Council, and the Institute for Strategic and International Studies (Malaysia). He worked as a senior practice consultant at the Abu Dhabi Gallup Center and was a Ford Fellow at the Brookings Institution's Center for Middle East Policy.

He has taught law at the American University in Cairo and held visiting fellowships at Cambridge University, Harvard Kennedy School, University of Warwick, and University of Technology Malaysia.

== Bibliography ==
- H.A. Hellyer. Muslims of Europe: The "Other" Europeans. Edinburgh University Press, 2010.
- H.A. Hellyer. A Revolution Undone: Egypt's Road beyond Revolt. Hurst and Company/Oxford University Press, 2016.
- H.A. Hellyer. A Sublime Way: The Sufi Path of the Sages of Makka. [Publication details needed]
