= Palestinian Civil Police Force =

Civilian policing force of the State of Palestine

Palestinian Civil Police Force الشرطة المدنية الفلسطينية
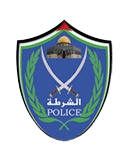
- Emblem
- Abbreviation: PCP

Agency overview
- Formed: 4 May 1994

Jurisdictional structure
- National agency: Palestine
- Operations jurisdiction: Palestinian Authority, Palestine
- Governing body: Ministry of Interior
- General nature: Civilian police

Operational structure
- Police Officers: 9,213
- Elected officer responsible: Ziad Hab al-Rih, Minister of the Interior
- Agency executive: Major General Allam Saqa, Chief of Police
- Parent agency: Palestinian Security Services

Facilities
- Stations: 68

Website
- https://www.palpolice.ps/en

The Palestinian Civil Police Force (PCP; Arabic: الشرطة المدنية الفلسطينية, romanized: al-Shurtah al-Madaniyah al-Filistiniyah), commonly known as the Palestinian Police, is the Civil Police organization tasked with traditional law enforcement duties in the territory governed by the Palestinian Authority. The Civil Police is a part of the Palestinian Security Services.

== History ==
The Civil Police was formally established with the May 1994 signing of the Gaza–Jericho Agreement, a chapter in the Oslo Accords process, under the umbrella of the General Security Service. Founded with over 10,000 officers, it was the largest substituent of the Palestinian National Security Forces. The agreement called for the civil police maintaining public order from 25 stations throughout the Palestinian-administered parts of the Gaza Strip and the West Bank.

Long-time Police head Ghazi al-Jabali was criticised for corruption and curbing press and civil rights freedoms. In 2004, he was kidnapped by the Jenin Martyrs Brigades, part of the Popular Resistance Committees, and only released after Palestinian President Yasser Arafat agreed to fire him. Al-Jabali was replaced with Arafat's cousin, Musa Arafat, a move which did little to restore public confidence in Police.

According to the International Crisis Group, Palestinian police and security forces succeeded in effectively "preventing, prosecuting and reducing crime" in the late 1990s.

During the course of the Second Intifada and its armed conflict, Palestinian police were unable to patrol armed or in uniform, lest they be engaged by Israeli security forces as combatants. As the armed conflict petered out after three years, Palestinian police forces returned to regular operations in 2003–2004.

=== Gaza Strip ===
Since the Hamas takeover of the Gaza Strip the control of the police in Gaza Strip came under the control of Hamas, while police forces in the West Bank remain under the Palestinian National Authority.

As a result of the 2025 Gaza peace plan, responsibility for policing in the Gaza Strip is to be assumed by a Gaza civil police force.

== Development ==
In order to aid the Palestinian government in "establishing sustainable and effective civil policing arrangements", the European Union Co-ordinating Office for Palestinian Police Support, EUPOLCOPPS, was established beginning 2006.

The Palestinian Civil Police development includes creation of a Jericho Police Training School, and strengthening of investigative sectors like Crime Investigation Department, Anti-Narcotics General Administration, and Investigation Section.

The EUCOPPS mission has facilitated the training of Civil Police personnel as well as the donation of equipment including vehicles from European donor-states.

A Palestinian Local Aid Coordination Secretariat strategic report on the Civil Police lists among the force's strengths its leadership's youth and academic credentials, high loyalty and commitment to regulations and motivation, while weaknesses included poorly or undefined legal frameworks and logistical shortages, especially communications equipment and transportation.

Since 2007, the Palestinian Civil Police and the Israel Police have increased cooperation as confidence-building measures and a part of Palestinian institution-building. Since their jurisdictions are intertwined, cooperative tactics include having Israel police issue traffic citations to Palestinian drivers and repatriating the proceeds to the Palestinian Civil Police.

== Directors ==
- Ghazi al-Jabali (1994–2002)
- Alaa Hosni (2002–2004)
- Saeb Al-Ajez (2004–2007)
- Kamal al-Sheikh (2007–2008)
- Hazem Atallah (March 25, 2008 – October 2, 2021)
- Youssef Al-Helou (October 2, 2021 – September 1, 2024)
- Allam Saqa (September 1, 2024 – present)

== Ranks ==
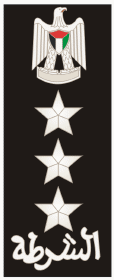
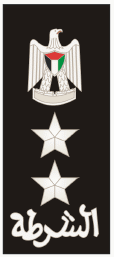
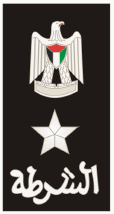
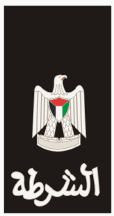
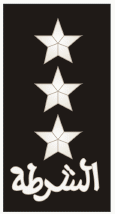
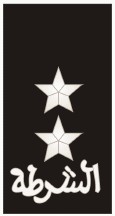
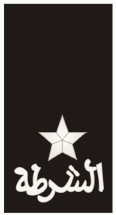
Rank group	General / flag officers		Senior officers			Junior officers
Palestinian Civil Police Force	No equivalent
Palestinian Civil Police Force	No equivalent	Brigadier General عميد ʿamīd	Colonel عقيد ʿaqīd	Lieutenant Colonel مقدم muqaddam	Major رائد rāʾid	Captain نقيب naqīb	1st Lieutenant ملازم أول mulāzim ʾawwil	Lieutenant ملازم mulāzim

== Gallery ==
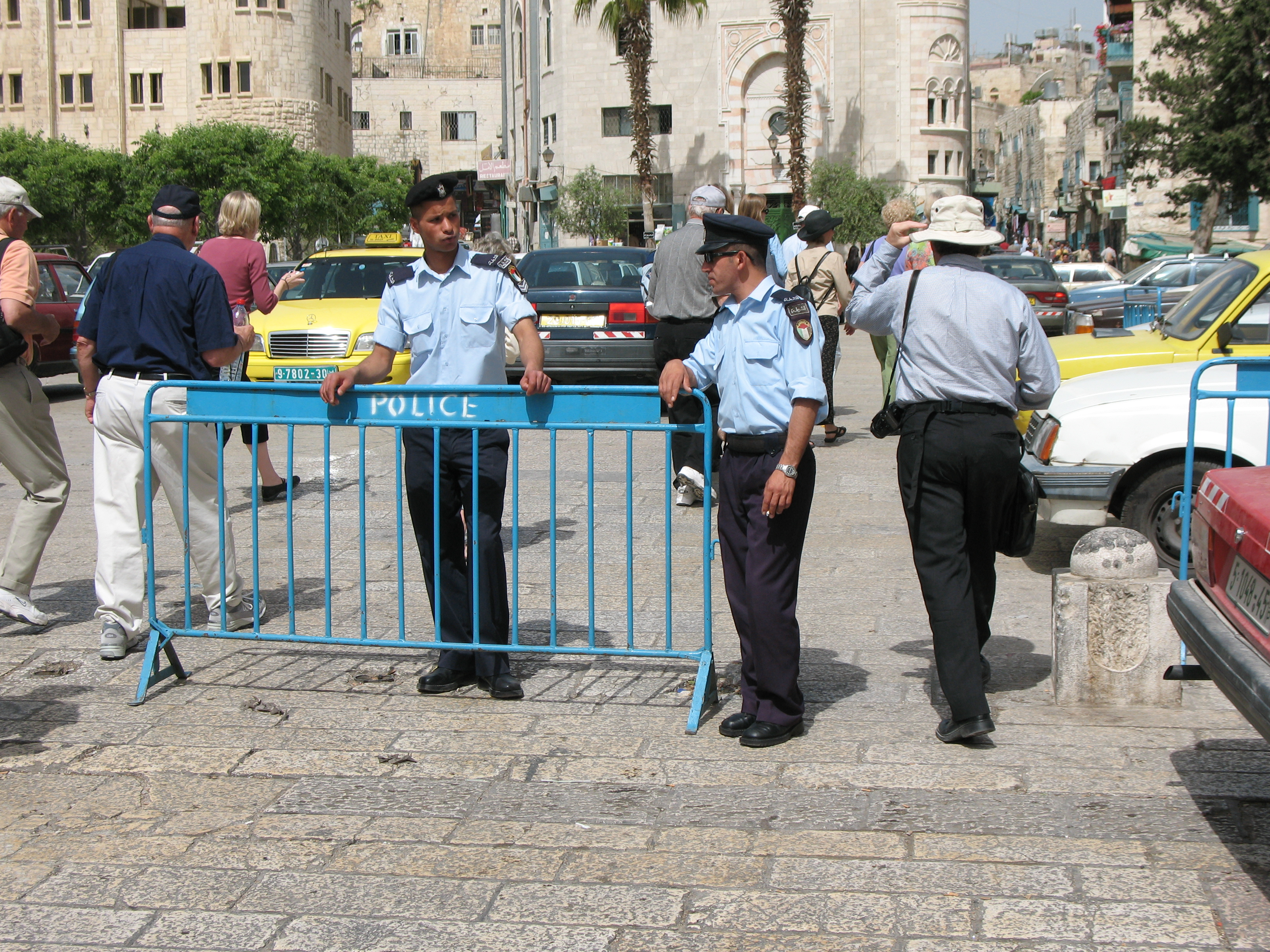
Two Palestinian Police Officers in Bethlehem

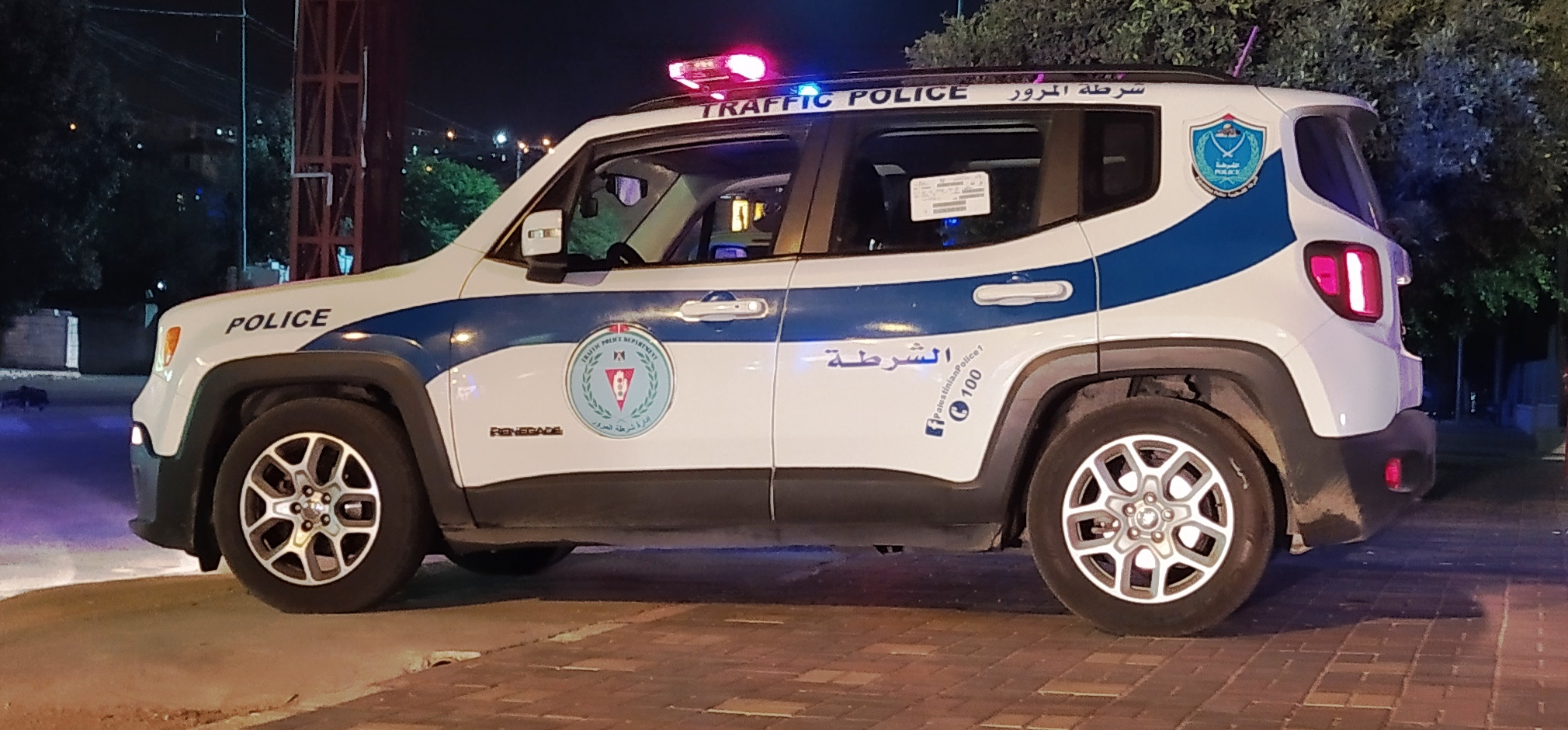
Traffic Unit in the West Bank city of Salfit

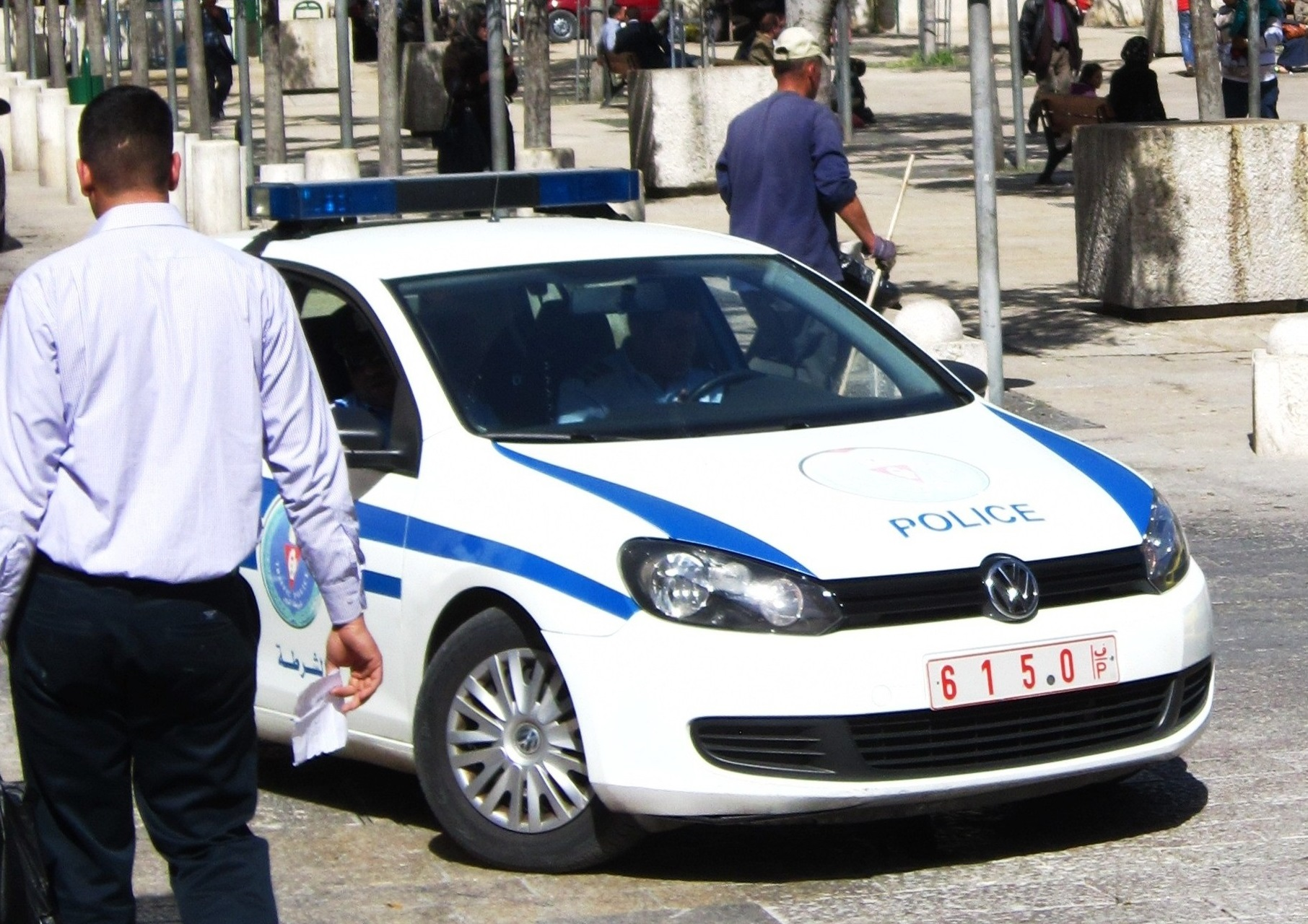
Patrol Unit in Bethlehem

== See also ==
- United States security assistance to the Palestinian Authority
- Common Security and Defence Policy
- European Union Police Mission for the Palestinian Territories
