= Fakura =

Fakhura or Fakhoura (or al-Fakura or el Fakoura) may refer to:

- al-Fakhurah, a town in the Latakia Governorate of Syria.
- al-Fakhura School, Jabalia Refugee Camp, Jabalia, North Gaza, Gaza Strip, Palestine-Israel; a UNRWA school that has been repeatedly attacked
  - al-Fakhura school incident (2009)
  - al-Fakura school shelling (2014), see 2014 Israeli shelling of UNRWA Gaza shelters
  - al-Fakhoora school airstrike (2023)
- Fakhoura Farm, Katzrin, Golan Heights, Golan, Syria-Israel
- Meshushim River, Yehudiya Forest Nature Reserve, Golan Heights, Golan, Syria-Israel; also known as the Wadi el-Fakura,
