= War crimes in the Gaza War (disambiguation) =

War crimes in the Gaza War may refer to:

- War crimes in the Gaza War (2008–2009)
- Human rights violations during the 2014 Gaza War
- War crimes in the Gaza war (2023–)
