= Gaza Ghetto =

Documentary film

- Directed by: Pea Holmquist; Joan Mandell; Pierre Bjorklund
- Produced by: Pea Holmquist; Joan Mandell
- Cinematography: Pea Holmquist
- Release date: 1984
- Running time: 82

Gaza Ghetto: Portrait of a Family, 1948 – 1984 is a documentary film about the life of a Palestinian family living in the Jabalia refugee camp, the largest Palestinian refugee camp at the time of the film.

The film, created by Joan Mandell, Pea Holmquist, and Pierre Bjorklund in 1984 is believed to be the first documentary ever made in Gaza.

== Production ==
The film was created by Joan Mandell, Pea Holmquist, and Pierre Bjorklund and produced by Icarus Films in 1984.

== Synopsis ==
The film primarily takes place in the Jabalia refugee camp, the largest Palestinian refugee camp at the time of the film, which housed approximately 45,000 inhabitants. It focuses on how life under military occupation affects the inhabitants.

Gaza Ghetto follows a refugee family from the Gaza Strip who visit the site of their former village, now a Jewish town in Israel. As the grandfather and great-grandfather point out an orchard and sycamore fig that belonged to Muhammed Ayyub and Uncle Khalil, an Israeli resident appears and tells them to leave, claiming they need a permit to be there. The mother tells him that, "We work in Jaffa and Tel Aviv and that's not forbidden," to which he replies, "Here it's forbidden." Ted Swedenburg mentions this scene in Memories of Revolt: The 1936-1939 Rebellion and the Palestinian National Past: "While chasing the refugee family off, he asserts forcibly that the site is his home."

The film features Israeli Prime Minister Ariel Sharon, Israeli politician and general Binyamin Ben-Eliezer, and IDF soldiers on patrol "candidly discuss[ing] their responsibilities."

== Critical reception ==
In his book, An Accented Cinema: Exilic and Diasporic Filmmaking, Hamid Naficy describes the film as an "early important film" on the Palestinian refugee situation. A 1987 film review by Taline Voskeritchian stated, "The film’s political loyalties and documentary diligence provide an articulate account of a deceptively simple theme, daily life in occupied Gaza."
