= 2014 Israeli shelling of UNRWA Gaza shelters =

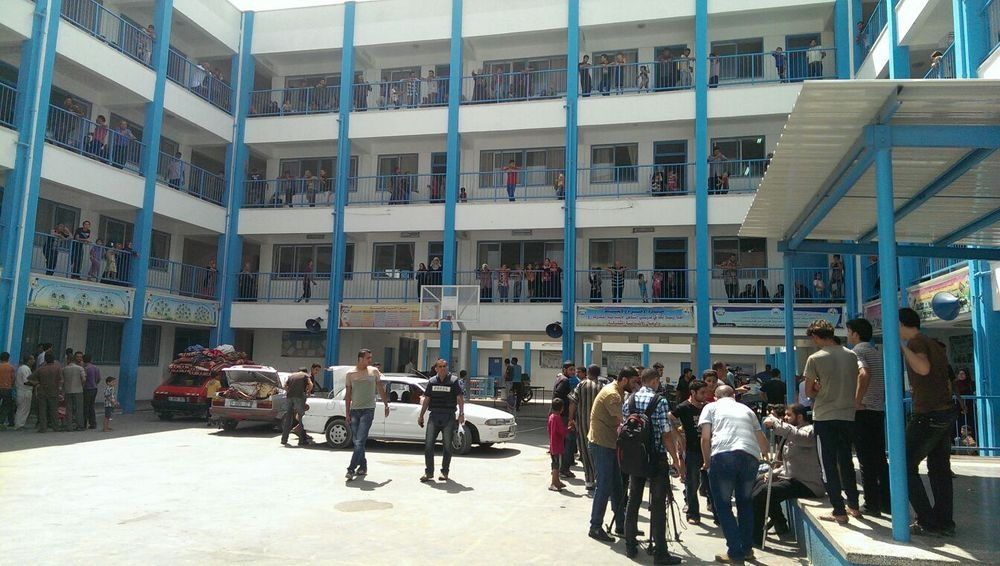
UNRWA school being used as shelter, July 2014

The 2014 Israeli shelling of UNRWA Gaza shelters were seven shellings at UNRWA facilities in the Gaza Strip which took place between 21 July and 3 August 2014 during the Israeli-Gaza conflict. The incidents were the result of artillery, mortar or aerial missile fire which struck on or near the UNRWA facilities being used as shelters for Palestinians, and as a result at least 44 civilians, including 10 UN staff, died. During the 2014 Israel-Gaza conflict, many Palestinians fled their homes after warnings by Israel or due to air strikes or fighting in the area. An estimated 290,000 people (15% of Gaza's population) took shelter in UNRWA schools.

On three occasions, on 16 July, 22 July and on 29 July, UNRWA announced that rockets had been found in their schools. UNRWA denounced the groups responsible for "flagrant violations of the neutrality of its premises". All of these schools were vacant at the time when rockets were discovered; no rockets were found in any shelters which were shelled. The Israel Defense Forces (IDF) stated that "Hamas chooses where these battles are conducted and, despite Israel's best efforts to prevent civilian casualties, Hamas is ultimately responsible for the tragic loss of civilian life. There has been repeated abuse of UN facilities by Hamas, with at least three cases of munitions storage within such facilities."

The attacks were condemned by members of the UN (UNRWA's parent organization) and other governments, such as the U.S., have expressed "extreme concern" over the safety of Palestinian civilians who "are not safe in UN-designated shelters." The Rafah shelling in particular was widely criticized, with Ban Ki-moon calling it a "moral outrage and a criminal act" and US State Department calling it "appalling" and "disgraceful". UN High Commissioner for Human Rights Navi Pillay said that both Hamas militants and Israel might have committed war crimes. A Human Rights Watch investigation into three of the incidents concluded that Israel committed war crimes because two of the shellings "did not appear to target a military objective or were otherwise indiscriminate", while the third Rafah shelling was "unlawfully disproportionate". On 27 April 2015, the United Nations released an inquiry which concluded that Israel was responsible for the deaths of at least 44 Palestinians who died in the shelling and 227 were injured.

== Background ==
Since the 2005 Israeli disengagement from Gaza, Palestinian militant groups in Gaza have launched rockets into Israel as part of the Gaza–Israel conflict. Gaza militants operate in civilian areas, draw return fire to civilian structures, and on some level benefit in the diplomatic arena from the rising casualties. Through the years, Israel has accused Hamas of launching rockets from schools, residential buildings, mosques and hospitals and Hamas has repeatedly been accused of using civilians as a human shields.

Israel says it takes precautions to avoid civilian casualties and collateral damage, making use if a variety of operational measures, including advance warnings and selective application of military force. Following the current conflict, U.S. military, General Martin Dempsey, Chairman of the Joint Chiefs of Staff, said that Israel went to "extraordinary lengths" to limit civilian casualties and collateral damage during its operation and that the Pentagon had sent a team to see what lessons could be learned from the operation. While a study into a Legal and operational assessment of Israel's targeting practices, found that Israeli targeting practices and positions on the application of the law of armed conflict (LOAC) are broadly within the mainstream of contemporary state practice, and their approach to targeting is consistent with the law and, in many cases, worthy of emulation. Example of advance warnings include phone messages and dropping leaflets, or by using the technique of roof knocking to warn citizens to evacuate their homes. However, this can also have the effect of worsening the humanitarian situation.

International critics have said Israel's actions were disproportionate to Palestinian rocket attacks and that led to 2,220 Palestinians being killed in the war, of whom a vast majority were civilians according to figures given by UN. A report by B'Tselem criticized Israel for bombing homes, which it says led to 606 people getting killed in 70 examined attacks. Breaking the Silence said they collected testimonies from over 60 unnamed soldiers to a report which criticized Israel's rules of engagement. Alistair Dawber wrote in The Independent that the "service personnel paint a picture that runs counter to official Israeli military claims that the surgical operation – which became a full-blown conflict after three Israeli teenagers were kidnapped and murdered in the occupied West Bank - took great care to avoid civilian casualties and that Gaza's already fragile infrastructure was not unnecessarily targeted". The Israeli military said they were "committed to properly investigating all credible claims raised via media, NGOs, and official complaints concerning IDF conduct during operation Protective Edge, in as serious a manner as possible" and that they had done so before and that the group had offered no proof. The Independent saw a letter where Breaking the Silence had contacted the Israeli military and requested a meeting with its chief of staff.

Israel has had a strained relationship with the United Nations. During the 2008–09 Gaza War, Israel shelled several UN schools. Among them were the Boys School in Beit Lahiya, the Asma Elementary School in Gaza City, the al-Fakhura school in Jabalia and a school in Khan Younis, which were run by the United Nations and were shelters for displaced persons. In one incident of a shelling on a UN warehouse also being used as a shelter, white phosphorus was used.

In 2014, Gaza–Israel conflict, over 5,000 homes have been destroyed and 30,000 other damaged by the IDF. A total of 460,000 Palestinians have been displaced due to these factors, since the beginning of the current conflict.

== Overview ==
The UN Relief and Works Agency for Palestine Refugees in the Near East (UNRWA) operated over 245 institutions and schools across the Gaza Strip. The agency has been providing shelter to people displaced by the Gaza–Israel conflict since 12 July, eventually operating 89 shelters. Overall, there were seven incidents in which death or injuries occurred at, or damage was done to, UNRWA Shelters. Of these three (Beit Hanoun, Jabaliya and Rafah) resulted in numerous civilian casualties. The other schools which were shelled include ones in Maghazi (hit twice), Deir El Balah and Zaitoun.

As of 24 July, UNRWA closed 23 facilities and Hamas took advantage of the closures to employ some of these vacant UNRWA buildings as weapon storage sites. On three separate occasions, Palestinian weapons and/or weapons components were found to have been placed in UNRWA schools – on 16, 22, and 29 July. UNRWA denounced the actions as "flagrant violations of the inviolability of its premises". UN Secretary-General Ban Ki-moon charged the fact that UN facilities were used by Palestinian militant involved in the fighting to store their weaponry and, in two cases, probably to fire from is "unacceptable".

UN High Commissioner for Human Rights Navi Pillay said on 31 July 2014 that both Hamas militants and Israel might have committed war crimes.

Israel said on 20 November 2014 that it would cooperate with a UN investigation established by U.N. Secretary-General Ban Ki-moon because it was "an authentic investigation with potential for us to improve our performance in the course of conflict and learn from our mistakes."

According to an investigation by Human Rights Watch, "Three Israeli attacks that damaged Gaza schools housing displaced people caused numerous civilian casualties in violation of the laws of war". It also criticized Palestinian militant groups for three unrelated cases where weapons and/or weapons components were found in vacant UNRWA schools and Israel for occupying one UNRWA school for military purposes.

The IDF stated that "Hamas chooses where these battles are conducted and, despite Israel's best efforts to prevent civilian casualties, Hamas is ultimately responsible for the tragic loss of civilian life. Specifically in the case of UN facilities, there has been repeated abuse of UN facilities by Hamas, namely with at least three cases of munitions storage within such facilities." Israel has criticized the UNHRC as biased and announced its own investigation into one incident (Beit Hanoun). Human rights groups have expressed skepticism, with Human Rights Watch, stating "Israel has a long record of failing to undertake credible investigations into alleged war crimes" and B'Tselem refusing to participate in the investigations.

== Schools attacked ==
=== Beit Hanoun Elementary Co-ed School A & D ===
During the 2014 conflict, the area surrounding the Beit Hanoun school was particularly dangerous and, as hostilities intensified, the entire area was exposed to fierce combat. The school was designated as a shelter on 18 July and was hit by indirect artillery fire on 24 July.

During the three or four days leading to the incident Israel's Coordination and Liaison Administration (CLA) have issued multiple warnings indicating that, rockets were being fired from and around the school and that it needed to be evacuated. On the day prior to the incident, the situation around the school worsened. The ICRC attempted to evacuate the school, but the majority of the residents refused to leave. During that night shrapnel and gunfire hit the school. In the morning military activity appeared to have de-escalated and most people chose to leave, decreased their number to approx 450.

On 24 July, the day of the incident, the IDF warned that it was about to target objectives 800 meters from the school. Given the risk, UNRWA decided to evacuate its staff as well. UNRWA stated that they contacted the CLA and repeatedly requested that a window of opportunity be granted for this purpose, but no such window was granted by the time of the incident. An attempt was made by UNRWA to persuade remaining residents of the school to leave, but they said that they would remain. UNRWA called the CLA and stated that UNRWA would not be evacuating the residents. Later, after some persuasion, the remaining residents choose to leave, but while awaiting evacuation, the school was hit by indirect artillery fires, resulting in 11 being killed, including seven children, two women, and one UN staff member. Additionally, 110 were wounded, including 55 children and 31 women.

A senior Israel military officer initially stated that the school shelling could have been caused by Israeli forces. Several other Gaza rockets have landed in Beit Hanoun and the IDF had not ruled out one of these rockets landing on the school. Gaza authorities however said that the school was shelled by Israeli forces.

The IDF on 27 July announced that they had concluded their investigation into the UNRWA deaths. They stated that one IDF mortar bomb had landed in a courtyard of the school but caused no injuries, and that the damage that caused the casualties was not caused by the IDF and UNRWA confirmed rockets fired by Hamas landed in the area. The UN stated that they will be conducting their own investigation as well.

UNRWA rejected the IDF's account, and stated that the initial shell that struck the school was followed by several others within minutes. UNRWA's preliminary investigation indicated that the school was shelled by the Israel Defense Forces.

Reporters who visited the school shortly after the attack said that the damage and debris that they observed was consistent with mortar rounds.

According to the Human Rights Watch investigation, the school was hit four times in short succession, and that the Israeli account was "implausible". It concluded that Israeli shells hit the schools. Regarding an Israeli statement that it asked ICRC to help evacuate the facility, but "Hamas prevented civilians from evacuating the area during the window that the IDF [Israel Defense Forces] gave them", Human Rights Watch stated that it found no evidence that Hamas had prevented anyone from leaving. The ICRC stated that it received no request from Israel to evacuate.

The UN investigation found that the incident was attributable to the IDF.

=== Jabalia Elementary Girls School A & B ===
The UNRWA School is located in a heavily built up area in the center of the Jabalia Camp. In the weeks and days prior to the incident, there were several incidents of shelling by the IDF of buildings in the vicinity of the School. In the days prior to the incident, armed clashes between militants and the IDF were talking place in the east of the Jabalia Camp and the IDF dropped leaflets requesting residents to move to Gaza City. However, witnesses interviewed by UNRWA had stated that there was no militant activity in the school or in its close vicinity, though one stated that she had heard rockets not far from the school in the days before the incident.

At some time between 04:30 and 04:45 in the morning of 30 July, an explosion occurred outside the school, causing shrapnel to fall into the schoolyard. At approximately 04:45, the school was hit by a barrage of four 155 MM high explosive (HE) projectiles, an artillery indirect fire weapon. Between 17 and 18 people were killed and 99 suffered injuries.

IDF officials acknowledged that five tank shells hit the school when soldiers responded to Mortar fire from the vicinity of the school. The IDF stated that Palestinian militants were firing about 200 yards away. A journalist from The New York Times who visited Jalabi days after the incident stated that no one they had interviewed had seen "Palestinian fighters or Israeli soldiers in the area... and there were no bullet holes or empty casings suggesting close clashes [in the area]." The UNRWA stated that Israel had been informed 17 times of the shelter's location, in order to avoid it.

According to the Human Rights Watch Investigation, "at least one shell apparently hit the roof of a classroom on the second floor where women and children were sleeping. Another shell hit the courtyard." It stated that Israel provided no evidence or information to suggest militants were operating in the area and that it "has not explained why, even if it were responding to militants' mortar fire, it used a weapon as indiscriminate as a high-explosive heavy-artillery shell so near to a UN school housing displaced people."

Following the incident, White House Press Secretary Josh Earnest condemned the shelling in his daily press briefing on 31 July 2014. He stated that "the shelling of a U.N. facility that is housing innocent civilians who are fleeing violence is totally unacceptable and totally indefensible. And it is clear that we need our allies in Israel to do more to live up to the high standards that they have set for themselves".

=== Rafah Preparatory A Boys School ===
The school is located in the densely populated city of Rafah, in the southern tip of the Gaza Strip. On the day of the incident it was sheltering approx. 2,700 to 2,900 persons. Between 10:40 and 10:45 of 3 August, a precision-guided missile, launched from the air by the IDF, struck the road outside the school, five to six meters from the school gate. Fifteen persons who were in the vicinity of the gate at the time were killed.

The Palestine Red Crescent Society announced that the attack occurred while people were in line to get food from aid workers. Robert Turner, director of operations for the U.N. Palestinian refugee agency in Gaza, said the strike killed at least one UN staffer. The attack was denounced by the UN secretary general Ban Ki-moon as a "moral outrage" and "criminal act", and condemned by the US State Department as disgraceful.

The Government of Israel stated to the UN Board of Inquiry that an examination of the incident was being undertaken at the request of the Military Advocate General (MAG). The IDF had fired an aerial-launched missile at the motorcycle, which had been carrying three militants from Palestinian Islamic Jihad. By the time that it became apparent that the strike would coincide with the motorcycle passing by the school gate, it had no longer been possible to divert the missile. Human Rights Watch, 2014 report, questioned the circumstances of the incident and Israeli stated target, saying that Israel has offered no convincing information. The UN Board of Inquiry 2015 report confirmed that the missile had been directed at a motorcycle carrying three individuals.

=== Table ===
#	School	Date	Killed	Wounded	Place
1	Maghazi Preparatory Girls School A & B	21 July 2014			Maghazi Camp
2	Maghazi Preparatory Girls School A & B	22 July 2014	–	1	Maghazi Camp
3	Deir El Balah Preparatory Girls School C	23 July 2014	–	5	Deir al-Balah
4	Beit Hanoun Elementary Co-ed School A & D	24 July 2014	15	200	Beit Hanoun
5	Zaitoun Preparatory Girls School B	29 July 2014.			Zeitoun
6	Jabalia Elementary Girls School A & B	29 July 2014	15-20	100+	Jabalia Camp
7	Rafah Preparatory A Boys School	3 August 2014	at least 10	35	Rafah
Total			40+ including 10+ UN staff members	341+	

== Reactions ==
- UN – Ban Ki-moon, Secretary-General of United Nations, condemned the Jubalia Camp incident at the school, describing it as "unjustifiable". After the 29 July incident, he pointed out that the precise location of this school had been communicated to the Israeli military authorities 17 times. He said: "Nothing is more shameful than attacking sleeping children" Ban Ki-moon described the attack on Rafah school as a "moral outrage and a criminal act" and called for those responsible for the "gross violation of international humanitarian law" to be held accountable.
  - UNRWA - Pierre Krähenbühl, Commissioner-General of the UNRWA, said: "Our shelters are overflowing. Tens of thousands may soon be stranded in the streets of Gaza, without food, water and shelter if attacks on these areas continue." "We have moved beyond what humanitarian action alone can deal with. This is now the time for political action. It is the time for accountability," he said. Krähenbühl described the Jubalia Camp incident as "probably one of the most tragic protection failures that the international community has witnessed." Asked to explain the scale of the civilian suffering to an Arab news station, UNRWA spokesman Chris Gunness simply burst into tears. "We have reached breaking point; our staff are being killed, our shelters overflowing", he adds.
- USA – A White House spokesman, said: "We are extremely concerned that thousands of internally displaced Palestinians who have been called on by the Israeli military to evacuate their homes are not safe in UN-designated shelters in Gaza." They continued by condemning "those responsible for hiding weapons in United Nations facilities in Gaza." US State Department said in a statement that the US is "appalled" by the "disgraceful shelling" outside the school in Rafah and urged Israel to do more to avoid civilian casualties.
- France – Ministry of Foreign Affairs condemned Israeli military attack that rocked a United Nations school in Jubalia in Gaza's biggest refugee camp.

== See also ==
- Israel and the United Nations
