= War crimes in the Gaza War (2008–2009) =

Accusations of violations regarding international humanitarian law, which governs the actions by belligerents during an armed conflict, have been directed at both Israel and Hamas for their actions during the 2008–2009 Gaza War. The accusations covered violating laws governing distinction and proportionality by Israel, the indiscriminate firing of rockets at civilian locations and extrajudicial violence within the Gaza Strip by Hamas. As of September 2009, some 360 complaints had been filed by individuals and NGOs at the prosecutor's office in the Hague calling for investigations into alleged crimes committed by Israel during the Gaza War.

On 15 September 2009, a 574-page report by UN inquiry team was released, officially titled "Human Rights in Palestine and Other Occupied Arab Territories: Report of the United Nations Fact Finding Mission on the Gaza Conflict". It concluded that the Israel Defense Forces (IDF) and Palestinian armed groups committed war crimes and possibly crimes against humanity. On 16 October 2009, the UN Human Rights Council endorsed the report.

== War crimes by Israel ==
The UN Human Rights Council, as well as many non-governmental organizations such as Amnesty International (AI) and Human Rights Watch, have accused the Israeli government of violating international law as regards collective punishment, targeting civilians, proportionality, of prohibiting access to medical assistance, and of using civilians as human shields. Richard Falk, the United Nations Special Rapporteur for Human Rights in the Occupied Territories and AI said that such actions are in violation of international humanitarian law governing the obligations of an occupying force and the laws of war. The Israeli government has responded to these accusations by stating that its use of force in the Gaza Strip are acts of self-defense rather than reprisals or punishment. Israeli human rights groups criticized the Israeli military for failing to properly investigate violations of the laws of war in Gaza, despite evidence of possible war crimes.

=== Report by UN High Commissioner for Human Rights ===
The Human Rights Council ordered a series of periodic reports aimed to assess the human rights situation in the occupied Palestinian Territories (OPT) following Israel's military operation. The first of the reports was set to be presented to the Council in September 2009. The report, compiled by UN High Commissioner for Human Rights Navi Pillay, alleges that the Israeli Defence Force breached laws of armed conflict by attacking indiscriminately civilians in at least several incidents, by targeting civilian and protected facilities, by damaging large number of buildings, by failing to provide unquestionably effective warning to civilians at risk and by failing to implement rules of international humanitarian law regarding military occupation. The report also states that indiscriminate rocket attacks, as well as ill-treatment and extrajudicial execution of detainees by Palestinian armed groups, constitute violations of laws of war. Navi Pillay also expressed a hope that the upcoming report by the fact-finding mission led by Judge Goldstone would serve as a basis for indicting the alleged perpetrators of the war crimes in the International Criminal Court.

=== Collective punishment ===
The UN Human Rights Council as well as many non-governmental organizations and notable figures, such as Amnesty International and Human Rights Watch, have accused Israel of imposing collective punishment on the population of Gaza by the blockade, invasion and bombardment of Gaza. Michael I. Krauss, Professor of Law at George Mason University School of Law and Abraham Bell, Director of the International Law Forum at the Jerusalem Center for Public Affairs, argue that the bar on collective punishment forbids the imposition of criminal or military penalties (imprisonment, death, etc.) on some people for crimes committed by other individuals, leading to the conclusion that none of Israel's actions involve the imposition of criminal-type penalties.

=== Attacks on civilians and civilian objects (the principle of distinction) ===
Israel has been criticized for violating laws covering distinction. Israel has stated that "anything affiliated with Hamas is a legitimate target." This has been criticized as being too broad. Amnesty International (AI) has said that this definition includes, "presumptively civilian" targets such as government ministries that serve no military purpose. Israel has said that these government ministries and the parliament building are part of the Hamas infrastructure and as such legitimate targets. B'Tselem describes Israel's reasoning as being "legally flawed," stating that simple Hamas' affiliation does not make such locations legitimate targets. Jerusalem Center for Public Affairs (JCPA) asserted that under various provisions on International Law (e.g., UN Security Council Resolution 1566), Palestinian governing authorities in Gaza, whether directly involved in terror attacks or not, are criminal terrorists, by virtue of their willing provision of finance, plan, support and safe haven for terrorists. AI and B'Tselem point out that in many instances, IDF targeted civilian buildings without providing explanation for the attack, and some of such attacks raise the strong possibility that Israel may have violated the prohibition against targeting objects indispensable to the survival of the civilian population. AI asserts that those instances would violate Articles 51, 52 and 54 of Protocol I. A Center for Strategic International Studies report notes that the IDF admits it did hit some purely civilian targets, including UN facilities, but says that it is not clear that combatants were not in or near such targets; CSIS also claims that the laws of war require an effort to discriminate, and not perfect success. AI further notes that Israel's firing of artillery, shelling from tanks and from naval ships into densely populated civilian areas in Gaza may also amount to indiscriminate attacks. Retired U.S. Army colonel said however that the number of artillery rounds was low, indicating considerable restraint from the IDF, and that from military perspective he believes that things could not have been done any differently.

In June 2009, HRW issued a report entitled "Precisely wrong", presenting an investigation of six UAV attacks that resulted in large civilian death. HRW concluded that in the cases probed, Israeli forces either failed to take all feasible precautions to verify that the targets were combatants, or failed to distinguish between combatants and civilians and to target only the former; as a result, HRW deduce that these attacks were a violation of International Humanitarian Law. The report methodology included interviews with victims and witnesses, investigations of the attack sites and IDF and media reports; the probes were based on the presumption that the impact mark and the fragmentation patterns were consistent with the Israeli-produced Spike missile that are used by the drones. The Israeli military did not cooperate with HRW on the report and said that the report appeared to be based on "unnamed and unreliable Palestinian sources" whose military expertise was "unproven". Spike's manufacturer, Israeli concern Rafael, says the missile can be fired not only by drones, but by helicopters, infantry units and naval craft. Several military experts said that drones may reach operational heights of 4,000 metres; the launch of a missile at that altitude would likely elude the naked eye. HRW military expert also conceded that two of the incidents cited took place in the evening or night, something that could potentially rule out anyone seeing the small aircraft.

In July 2009, Amnesty released 117-page report that was based on physical evidence and testimony gathered by a team of four researchers, including a military expert, from dozens of attack sites in Gaza and southern Israel during and after the war. The pattern of Israeli attacks and the high number of civilian casualties "showed elements of reckless conduct, disregard for civilian lives and property and a consistent failure to distinguish between military targets and civilians and civilian objects," Amnesty charged. The group said that hundreds of Palestinian civilians were killed using high-precision weapons, while others were shot at close range. The IDF responded that the report ignores the efforts the military made to minimize harm to innocent civilians that included millions of flyers, personal phone calls to homes of Palestinians and radio broadcasts to warn civilians of the impending operation.

In August 2009, HRW published a report that deals with seven incidents in which 11 Palestinian civilians, including 5 women and 4 children, were killed by Israeli soldiers despite the fact that they were waiving white flags supposedly visible to the IDF. According to the testimonies on which the report is based, the IDF was in control of the areas in which the incidents occurred, no fighting was taking place at the time when they occurred and no armed people traveled among the civilians. HRW researches concluded that the Israeli soldiers at best failed to protect civilians, and at worst deliberately shot at them. In one of the cases mentioned in the report, on 7 January, Israeli soldiers shot and killed two of the girls of the Abd Rabbo family (aged 2 and 7), wounding the third girl (aged 4) and their grandmother. Pro-Israeli NGOs CAMERA and NGO Monitor found out significant contradictions between the testimonies of the family members and the neighbors that were told HRW and the reports of the incident published in numerous newspapers in winter 2009. In a response to the report, the Israeli military said its soldiers were obligated to avoid harming anyone waving a white flag, but that in some cases Hamas militants had used civilians with white flags for cover. In correlation with the statement, the IDF uploaded a video to the internet depicting what it said was a Hamas gunman planting an explosive device and then attempting to take shelter in a home of uninvolved civilians waving white flags during fighting in Gaza. Nevertheless, as of September 2009, the IDF is investigating several similar allegations, including the complaint filed by the Al-Mezan Center for Human Rights on behalf of the Abd Rabbo family.

==== Attacks on civil police ====
HRW points out that under international humanitarian law, police are presumed to be civilian - and thus immune from attack - unless formally incorporated into the armed forces of a party to a conflict or directly participating in the hostilities. HRW representative stated that a decision that police and police stations are legitimate military targets depends on whether those police play a role in fighting against Israel, or whether a particular police station is used to store weapons or for some other military purpose. IDF stated that it perceives police in Gaza as equivalent to the enemy's armed force and as such legitimate targets. Israeli Intelligence and Terrorism Information Center (ITIC) alleged that the distinction between the internal security forces and Hamas military wing is not sharply defined and cites Gaza police officials who said that police were instructed to fight the enemy in case of an invasion into the Gaza Strip. Many security force members were reported to "moonlight" with the Izzidin al-Qassam Brigades. Amnesty International criticized Israel for targeting and killing large number of civilian police. One of the traffic course trainees who had participated in the ceremony attacked by IAF on 27 December 2008, told B'Tselem that they were trained in first-aid and in maintaining order. The Israeli 'Orient Research Group' claimed that 78 of the 89 killed during the first IAF strike were terror operatives, many of them belonging to the al-Qassam Brigades. In an update published in September 2009, JCPA claims that among the total of 343 members of the Palestinian security forces who were killed, 286 have been identified as terror organization members.

The Goldstone Report concluded that while there were many individual Gaza policemen who were members of militant groups, the Gaza police forces were a civilian police force and "cannot be said to have been taking a direct part in hostilities and thus did not lose their civilian immunity from direct attack as civilians". The report did not "rule out the possibility that there might be individuals in the police force who retain their links to the armed groups" but finds no evidence that the police were part of the Gaza armed forces and that it "could not verify the allegations of membership of armed groups of policemen." NGO UN Watch noted that the Goldstone Report relies on the testimony of the Gaza police spokesperson Islam Shahwan and accepts the interpretation of his own words "face the enemy" as meaning "distributing food stuffs". In the initial response to the fact-finding mission's report, issued on 24 September 2009, Israeli Government further added that "in seeking to support its assertion" that the police in Gaza were a civilian police force, not only did the committee reinterpreted some of the evidence, but also ignored other explicit statements of the police officials, e.g. the alleged admission by Hamas police chief Jamal al-Jarrah that "the police took part in the fighting alongside the resistance".

=== The principle of proportionality ===
Amnesty stated that some attacks on homes of Hamas leaders have killed dozens of civilians, even though it should have been apparent to Israeli forces that the target of attack was not likely to be present or that civilians were likely to be killed in the attack. AI asserted that such conduct may amount to disproportionate attacks, a type of indiscriminate attack, that "may be expected to cause incidental loss of civilian life, injury to civilians, damage to civilian objects, or a combination thereof, which would be excessive in relation to the concrete and direct military advantage anticipated" (Article 51(5b) of Additional Protocol I). The official report of the Israeli Government, published in July 2009, notes that while Israel is not a party to the Protocol I, Israel however accepts its provisions as reflective of customary international law. A senior legal adviser in Israel's Ministry of Foreign Affairs points out that a standard practice in assessing the anticipated military advantage, as was established by committee to review NATO bombings in Yugoslavia, is that of 'reasonable military commander' rather than a human rights lawyer. Professor Newton, expert in laws of warfare testifying in front of the Goldstone committee, said that in order to properly examine a proportionality assessment, the relevant question is what information was available to the commander at the time the attack was authorized.

Jerusalem Center for Public Affairs (JCPA) asserts that the rule of distinction permits attacking legitimate targets, even if the attack is expected to cause collateral damage to civilians and even if, in retrospect, the attack was a mistake based on faulty intelligence; moreover, Article 28 of the Fourth Geneva Convention makes clear that the presence of civilians "may not be used to render certain points or areas immune from military operations". CSIS report notes that Israel planned its air and air-land campaigns in ways that clearly discriminated between military and civilian targets and that were intended to limit civilian casualties and collateral damage, by systematic and comprehensive use of its IS&R assets, careful mapping, GPS abilities and guidance from targeting experts briefed in the laws and conventions of war; the report concludes that this aspect of the IDF's actions met the key legal test that the anticipated military advantage did not outweigh the risk to civilians. Israeli Government report further adds that on numerous occasions a last-minute decision not to attack legitimate military targets or to divert missiles moments before the impact was upheld to avoid the possibility of civilian harm, even though such an attack might not be excessive in relation to the anticipated military advantage. The report claims that the IDF also refrained from attacking al-Shifa Hospital in Gaza City, despite alleged Hamas' use of an entire ground floor wing as its headquarters, out of concern for the inevitable harm to civilians present in the hospital.

=== Food, medical supplies and relief ===
AI accused Israel of failure to provide adequate supply of food, essential supplies, medicine and medical care to the population of Gaza, as well as deliberate impediment of emergency relief and humanitarian assistance. JCPA asserted that according to Article 23 of the Fourth Geneva Convention, Israel is under no obligation to provide anything itself; Israel is only required not to interfere with passage of food and so forth sent by others for the benefit of children under age fifteen, mothers of newborns and pregnant women; under Article 23, a party can block passage even of food, clothing and medicine even for these population groups if it has serious grounds for suspecting that the items will be intercepted before reaching their destination. Several instances of Hamas seizing convoys of humanitarian aid were reported before and in the course of the fighting. Israel Ministry of Foreign Affairs claimed that more than 37,000 tons of humanitarian aid were allowed to Gaza from Israel and that numerous efforts for providing medical help took place during the war. The emergency clinic, opened at the Erez crossing at the end of the fighting, was shut down shortly due to the low number of Palestinian patients, supposedly as the result of a direct order by Hamas not to transfer the wounded to Israel.

=== Destruction of homes and property ===
AI points out that according to Article 53 of the Fourth Geneva Convention, destruction of homes and property of Palestinians is forbidden, unless it is militarily necessary to do so; unjustified violation of the prohibition is, in accordance with Article 147, a grave breach of the IHL. The comprehensive Amnesty International report, published in July 2009, notes that the destruction of homes, businesses and public buildings during Israeli offensive was in many cases "wanton and deliberate" and "could not be justified on the grounds of military necessity". The report stated that more than 3,000 homes were destroyed and approximately 20,000 were damaged. Deliberations by the IDF during the conflict resulted in a decision that striking homes supposedly used to store weapons, when "sufficient warning" is given to the residents, falls within the boundaries of international law and is therefore legitimate, citing Article 52(2) of Protocol I of the Geneva Conventions, which defines a site being used for military activities as a legitimate target.

=== Weapons ===
Israel has been criticized for using weapons such as white phosphorus and flechette shells which human rights groups have said violate laws on distinction.

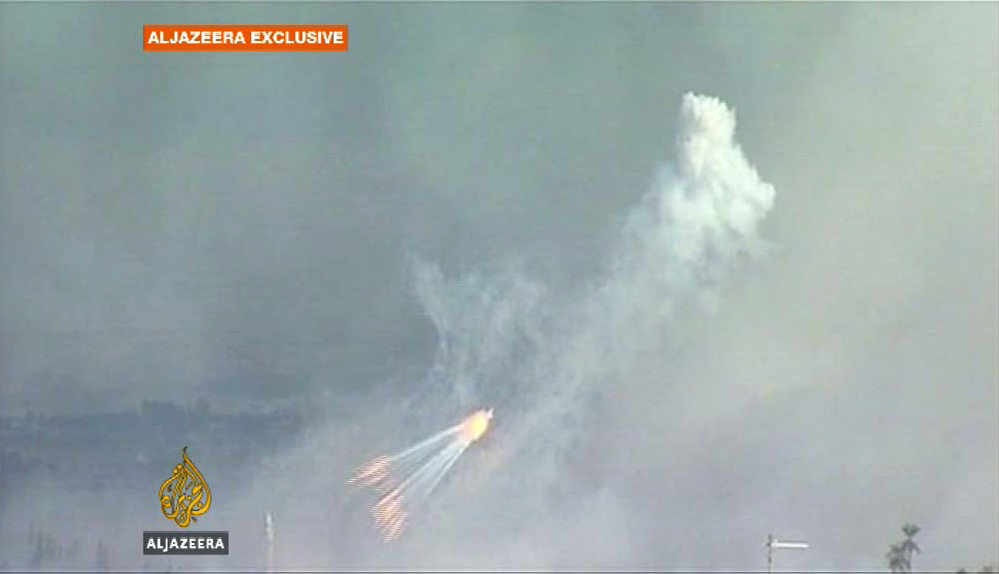
Israel used white phosphorus munitions during the conflict.

The Israeli military used white phosphorus munitions in the Gaza Strip. The IDF repeatedly denied using white phosphorus munitions but acknowledged its use after the conflict. Israel claims the use was in compliance with international law. The use of white phosphorus against civilians is banned under international law, but it is legal to use the substance in other conditions such as to illuminate areas during night or as a smoke screen. The weapon has a potential to cause particularly severe and painful burns or death. Colonel Lane, military expert testifying in front of the fact-finding mission in July 2009, told that white phosphorus is used for smoke generation to hide from the enemy. He stated that "the quality of smoke produced by white phosphorus is superb; if you want real smoke for real coverage, white phosphorus will give it to you". Professor Newton, expert in laws of armed conflict testifying in front of the committee, said that in an urban area, where potential perils are snipers, explosive devices and trip wires, one effective way to mask forces' movement is by white phosphorus. In certain cases, he added, such choice of means would be least harmful for civilian population, provided that the use of white phosphorus withstands the proportionality test. He also stressed that the white phosphorus munition is neither chemical nor incendiary weapon.

Donatella Rovera, Amnesty's researcher on Israel and the Occupied Palestinian Territories said that such extensive use of this weapon in Gaza's densely populated residential neighbourhoods is inherently indiscriminate. "Its repeated use in this manner, despite evidence of its indiscriminate effects and its toll on civilians, is a war crime," she said.

On 25 March, Human Rights Watch, published a report titled Rain of Fire, Israel's Unlawful Use of White Phosphorus in Gaza providing, "witness accounts of the devastating effects that white phosphorus munitions had on civilians and civilian property in Gaza."

The Israeli government released a report in July 2009 that stated that the IDF used white phosphorus in exploding munitions and smoke projectiles. The report stated that the use of exploding munitions were used by Israeli ground and naval forces. The report defended the use of these munition stating that they were only fired on unpopulated areas for marking and signaling and not as an anti-personnel weapon. The report further says that the main type of munitions containing white phosphorus employed by the IDF during the Gaza Operation was smoke screening projectiles, which are smoke shells containing felt wedges dipped in white phosphorus. The report suggests that the use of smoke obscurants proved to be highly effective at cloaking IDF forces while obstructing enemy lines of sight and that at no time did IDF forces have the objective of inflicting any harm on the civilian population.

Amnesty International stated that the Israeli army used flechette shells in densely populated civilian areas resulting in the injuries and deaths of civilians. The anti-personnel weapon spreads up to 8000 4 cm long metal darts over a 30,000 square meter area. The army has argued that it has used the weapons very selectively. Use of the munition is not forbidden under international law.

Military expert told Goldstone team that there is no proof that Dense Inert Metal Explosive (DIME) rounds were used, but he is of view that some weapons systems used in the conflict had some sort of DIME component, citing evidence of tungsten, iron, and sulfur in samples analyzed in a forensic lab. He made it clear the intent of Israel if it did indeed use these weapons was to reduce civilian casualties; however, those within the area of dispersal will experience catastrophic injuries, possibly leading to multiple amputations.

Sir John Stanley, a British Member of Parliament and an ex-cabinet member who served as the Minister of State for the Armed Forces for eight years, considers the use of DIME weapons a stealth method of killing and to breach Protocol 1 of the Convention on Certain Conventional Weapons to which Israel is a signatory.

The Goldstone Report wrote that the Mission was not in a position to state with certainty that DIME munitions were used by the Israeli armed forces, though it received reports from Palestinian and foreign doctors who had operated in Gaza during the military operations of a high percentage of patients with injuries compatible with their impact. The report added that as it currently stands, DIME weapons and weapons armed with heavy metal are not prohibited under international law, but do raise specific health concerns.

=== Human shields allegations ===
On 24 March, a report from the UN team responsible for the protection of children in war zones was released, it found "hundreds" of violations of the rights of children and accused Israeli soldiers of shooting children, using children as human shields, bulldozing a home with a woman and child still inside, and shelling a building they had ordered civilians into a day earlier. One case involved using an 11-year-old boy as a human shield, by forcing him to enter suspected buildings first and also inspect bags. The report also mentioned the boy was used as a shield when Israeli soldiers came under fire. The Guardian has also received testimony from three Palestinian brothers aged 14, 15, and 16, who all claimed to have been used as human shields.

The UK newspaper The Guardian conducted an investigation of its own which, according to the paper, uncovered evidence of war crimes including the use of Palestinian children as human shields and the targeting of medics and hospitals. The paper also found evidence of attacks on clearly distinguishable civilian targets.

In the report published by human rights NGO Breaking the Silence in July 2009, two testimonies were dedicated to alleged cases of using Palestinian civilians as human shields who were forced to enter suspect buildings ahead of troops. One of the testimonies were of the Golani Brigade soldier, who said that he had not seen Palestinians being used as human shields but had been told by his commanders that this occurred. Golani Brigade commander Col. Avi Peled said in response that the soldier had not been in combat at the time and that his testimony is based on what he heard happened. Peled added that at no point was there any civilian who was sent in ahead of Israeli troops to any place.

Richard Falk, the UN's Special Rapporteur on Human Rights in the Palestinian territories, alleged that Israel had confined Palestinian civilians to the combat zone in Gaza and prevented them from leaving during bombardment. Such a practice was a "new crime against humanity", Falk said and called for Israel to be held accountable. Aharon Leshno Yar, Israel's ambassador to the UN Human Rights Council, condemned the report, saying Israel found the report "to have no value except to narrowly further the politicized agenda of the Human Rights Council ... The report grossly and undeniably includes significant factual and legal errors and misrepresentations." NGO UN Watch noted that the US and the Czech Republic on behalf of the European Union had argued that Falk's report should be discredited for its unbalanced and unconstructive approach, suggesting that the Human Rights council look into the objectivity of his mandate, which is to only investigate Israel's violations while ignoring those of the Palestinians.

=== Attacking and obstructing medical workers ===
Amnesty International said in their report, published in July 2009, that lives were lost because Israeli forces "frequently obstructed access to medical care". Moreover, Amnesty accused Israel of using civilians, including children, as human shields in Gaza, forcing them to remain in houses which its troops were using as military positions, and to inspect sites suspected of being booby trapped. Israeli military correspondent recorded evidence of a Palestinian family that had insisted on staying in the house occupied by IDF, but at the same time tried to accuse forces of abusing civilians.

Physicians for Human Rights-Israel (PHR) stated the Israeli military violated medical ethics codes during its offensive, not only refusing to evacuate besieged and wounded families, but also preventing Palestinian medical teams from reaching the wounded. PHR quoted figures issued by the World Health Organization (WHO) which showed 16 Palestinian medical personnel were killed by Israeli fire during the offensive and that 25 were wounded while performing their duties. The IDF representative said in response that Hamas fighters had "methodically made use of medical vehicles, facilities and uniforms in order to conceal and camouflage terrorist activity, and in general used ambulances to carry terror activists and weapons." An IDF investigation, published on 22 April 2009, stated that seven Palestinian medical personnel have been killed by the IDF, of which five were Hamas operatives (including a nephew of the Health Minister in Gaza) and two were civilians. The Israeli Government report published in July 2009 further states that some of the reported cases of attacks on medical personnel were based on false information; in one such case the supposedly killed driver of the ambulance was allegedly interviewed on a Hamas website a few days after the incident.

The PHR report further claimed that the Palestinian health system "collapsed" during the operation and failed to provide adequate medical care for the wounded. The WHO report, however, noted that there was no shortage in medicine or medical supplies and that hospitals were never more than 75% full.

The PHR report accused the IDF of failing to assist in the evacuation of wounded Palestinians from the battlefield, claiming that the army had "created countless obstacles for the rescue teams in the field who attempted to evacuate trapped and injured persons." The Defense Ministry, however, said in its report that the Palestinian health authorities had refused to cooperate with the Gaza Coordination and Liaison Administration (CLA) to coordinate the transfer of wounded to Israel, despite "numerous requests by the CLA".

=== Attacks on UN facilities ===
Ban Ki-Moon ordered a UN Headquarters Board of Inquiry led by Ian Martin to independently investigate the nine most serious attacks on UN personnel and property. Israeli Government report says that while Israel viewed this inquiry as premature, pending the conclusion of its internal investigations, it cooperated fully with the Board, providing it with pertinent information.

Israel was faulted in seven of the nine cases, and Hamas was found guilty in one of the nine. The Israeli Government report notes however that the test applied by the Board was merely whether the physical premises of UN facilities had been affected and not whether the Laws of Armed Conflict were violated.

One of those included an UNRWA school incident in Jabalia that the UN says killed between 30 and 40 people. IDF officials claim the UN has confirmed that shells fired by Israeli forces landed outside the school compound. The report accused Israel of "gross negligence" and also stated that allegations that militants had fired from within UN premises "were untrue, continued to be made after it ought to have been known that they were untrue, and were not adequately withdrawn and publicly regretted." Ban plans to seek up to $11 million in damages from Israel.

Israeli officials rejected the report as one-sided, saying it ignored the fact that Israel was fighting a war against a terrorist organization. The IDF conducted its own probe into claims regarding incidents where UN and international facilities were fired upon and damaged. The findings published argue that in all the cases investigated, the damage resulted either from retaliatory fire or from misuse of the UN vehicles by Hamas militants and that there were no deliberate intentions to hit UN facilities.

=== Military experts' opinions ===
A study by military analyst Anthony H. Cordesman of the Center for Strategic and International Studies concluded that Israel did not violate the laws of war during its operation in Gaza. In his report he says that Israel used "decisive force to enhance regional deterrence", which he determined to be a "legitimate military objective". Norman Finkelstein, a political scientist, wrote that Cordesman's study lacked credibility as it is based almost entirely on official Israeli sources and ignored information that was readily available from the UN, NGOs and news reports. As stated in the Cordesman report, he relied exclusively on information provided by official Israeli sources, noting that Palestinian authorities in Gaza could provide primarily ideological and propaganda statements". Cordesman's view was shared by Colonel Richard Kemp, former commander of British forces in Afghanistan. Kemp stated that during Operation Cast Lead, the IDF did more to safeguard the rights of civilians in a combat zone than any other army in the history of warfare. Kemp also highlighted many of the efforts made by the IDF to reduce collateral damage including; Giving civilians four-hour notice to leave targeted areas, dropping over 900,000 leaflets, making over 30,000 phone calls to Palestinian households in Gaza, aborting airstrikes where the risk of collateral damage would be too great and allowing huge amounts of humanitarian aid to Gaza, at risk to themselves. Kemp reserved his criticism for Hamas which he said deliberately deployed its forces behind the "human shield of the civilian population" and employed a deliberate policy of operating consistently outside international law.

=== Human-rights activists' accusations ===
Sixteen human rights campaigners, including Desmond Tutu and Mary Robinson, sent an open letter to the United Nations calling for a "prompt, independent and impartial investigation [that] would provide a public record of gross violations of international humanitarian law committed." The letter stated that the signatories had been "shocked to the core" by the damage inflicted during the Israeli offensive. In response to criticism of using disproportionate force, OC Southern Command Maj.-Gen. Yoav Gallant said, "800 terrorists and 300 civilians, who we did not want to harm, were killed ... This ratio of almost a quarter [of the individuals] uninvolved [in the fighting] is an achievement unmatched in the history of this kind of combat."

=== Identity protection of Israeli soldiers and defense team ===
In order to protect soldiers from charges for possible war crime charges, the IDF censor banned the publication of the identity of military leaders who fought Hamas in Gaza. In addition, a defense team was set up to co-ordinate a legal defense for civilians and the military, should war crimes charges be raised.

=== Goldstone controversy ===
The UN report on the conflict was denounced by the United States Congress and Israeli leadership, with Benjamin Netanyahu stating that the report, and Judge Richard Goldstone, its lead author, were grave threats to Israel. Goldstone was subjected to personal attacks. Robert Fisk reported that Goldstone was pressured by Israel and members of his family to recant his report, was harassed by the Jewish community of South Africa, and "was in a state of great personal distress." On 1 April 2011, Judge Goldstone published an op-ed in the Washington times retracting a core finding of the original Goldstone report. He stated that "While the investigations published by the Israeli military and recognized in the U.N. committee's report have established the validity of some incidents that we investigated in cases involving individual soldiers, they also indicate that civilians were not intentionally targeted as a matter of policy." He also said that the UN Human Rights Commission has "a history of bias against Israel [that] cannot be doubted."

Hina Jilani, Christine Chinkin and Desmond Travers, the other members of the Goldstone report, released a statement contradicting Goldstone. They said there is "no justification for any demand or expectation for reconsideration of the report as nothing of substance has appeared that would in any way change the context, findings or conclusions of that report with respect to any of the parties to the Gaza conflict. Indeed, there is no UN procedure or precedent to that effect". After publication his op-ed, and pressure from the United States and Israel to nullify the report, Goldstone refused to recant it, stating, "As presently advised I have no reason to believe any part of the report needs to be reconsidered at this time."

== War crimes by Palestinian militant groups ==
=== Attacks directed against civilians and civilian objects ===
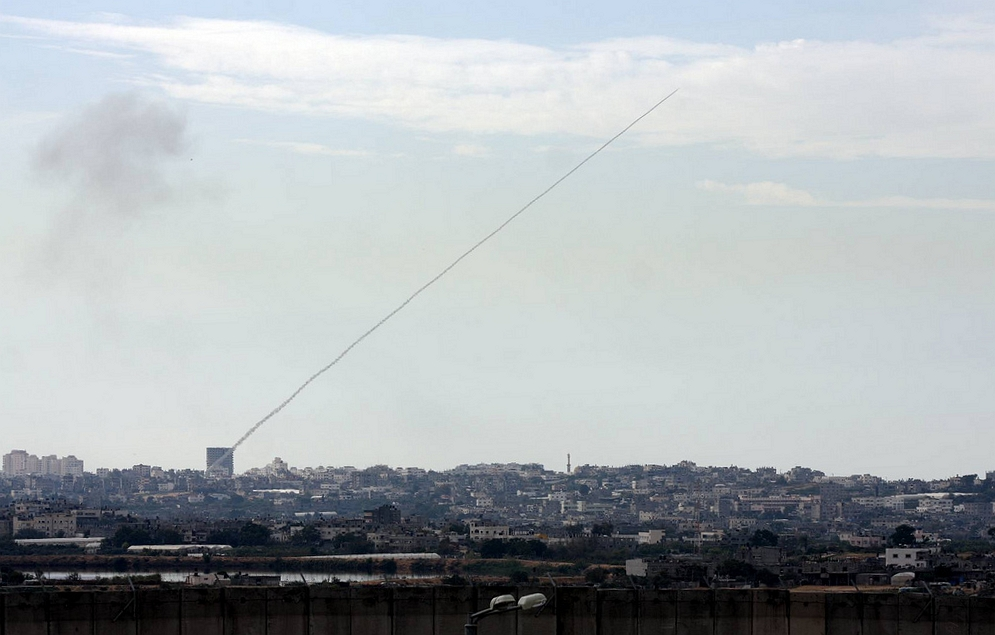
A rocket is fired from Gaza to Israel in December 2008.

As stated by several sources, including the UN official and Human Rights Watch (HRW) report published in August 2009, deliberate and systematic targeting of civilians and civilian objects in southern Israel since 2001 by Palestinian armed groups' rocket attacks violates International Humanitarian Law and amount to war crimes. Israeli Intelligence and Terrorism Information Center (ITIC) note that such attacks contravene the Principle of Distinction, as encapsulated by Article 48 of Additional Protocol I to the Geneva Conventions of 1949: "it is strictly prohibited to direct attacks at civilian objects or civilians not taking a direct part in hostilities". Furthermore, former Canadian justice minister and McGill University law professor, Irwin Cotler, and the ITIC point out that violation of this prohibition also amounts to a war crime as defined in the Article 8(2)(b)(i) of the Rome Statute of the International Criminal Court.

HRW and B'Tselem reports notice that even if the above attacks were directed at a specific military objective, they would still be unlawful, due to the fact that the types of rockets used by Palestinian armed groups are imprecise and cannot be directed in a way that discriminates between military targets and civilians.

In 2007, exiled Hamas political chief Khaled Mashal called recent rockets attacks on Israel "self-defense". Hamas leaders argue that "rocket attacks on Israel are the only way to counter Israel's policies and operations, including artillery strikes". Nevertheless, HRW has said that such justifications do not overcome the illegality of the attacks under laws governing reprisals, which prohibit direct or indiscriminate attacks on civilians. In its August 2009 report, HRW notes that the absence of Israeli military forces in the areas struck by the rockets, as well as statements from the leaders of Hamas and other armed groups, indicate that many of these attacks are deliberately intended to strike Israeli civilians and civilian structures; individuals who willfully authorize or carry out deliberate or indiscriminate attacks against civilians are committing war crimes.

The Amnesty report, published in July 2009, said Palestinian militants rocket fire from the Gaza Strip was "indiscriminate and hence unlawful under international law", regardless of small number of civilian casualties. Hamas official rejected the report as "unbalanced, unfair and unprofessional," calling the firing of rockets "self defense" and a legitimate response to Israel's actions.

HRW report, published in August 2009, says that the rocket attacks have also placed civilians in Gaza at risk, killing several local residents; furthermore, Palestinian armed groups have frequently violated the laws of war by firing rockets from within populated areas, failing to take all feasible precautions to avoid placing military targets within densely populated areas. In a response to HRW report, Hamas spokesman denied the charges, saying that "Hamas did not fire rockets from residential areas, Hamas does not target civilians". Addressing the allegations in the UN Fact-Finding Mission's report, a spokesman for Hamas in Gaza further added that the rockets fired at Israel were in self-defense and were not intended to target civilians: "We were targeting military bases, but the primitive weapons make mistakes".

=== Attacks aimed to spread terror ===
HRW points out that primary purpose of the rocket attacks seems to be at least to spread terror among the Israeli civilian population. HRW adds that the rockets have created a pervasive climate of fear among people in the areas where they can reach. During the fighting, the psychological effect of the rocket strikes paralyzed life across Israel's south. HRW official stated that "firing rockets into civilian areas with the intent to harm and terrorize Israelis has no justification whatsoever, regardless of Israel's actions in Gaza". Military expert, who testified in front of the fact-finding UNHCR mission in July 2009, said that rockets launched from Gaza Strip belong to Improvised Explosive Devices (IEDs) type of weapon that incorporate "destructive, lethal, noxious, pyrotechnic materials" that are used in 70% of global terror attacks. He further noticed that the level of lethal damage of IEDs is low compared to other means and that their primary impact on the target is psychological. ITIC asserted that the attacks aimed at sowing terror among Israel's civilian population are prohibited under International Humanitarian Law and violate Article 51(2) of Additional Protocol I to the Geneva Conventions: "Acts or threats of violence the primary purpose of which is to spread terror among the civilian population are prohibited."

=== Attacks from populated areas ===
The BBC reported on 5 January that "Witnesses and analysts confirm that Hamas fires rockets from within populated civilian areas. Amnesty International assessed that Hamas fighters put civilians in danger by firing from homes. United Nations Humanitarian Affairs Chief John Holmes accused Hamas of "reckless and cynical" use of civilian facilities during the hostilities in the Gaza Strip, and told that the above, as well as indiscriminate firing of rockets against civilian populations, are clear violations of International Humanitarian Law. In the course of the fighting, purported evidence of Hamas' exploitation of civilian infrastructure were recorded in ITIC reports. A study by CSIS suggests that Hamas must share responsibility for the outcome on the civil population, as it seems to have relied on the population density of Gaza to both deter Israeli attacks, and as a defense against Israeli offensive. Irwin Cotler said that attacks from within civilian areas and civilian structures in order to be immune from a response, e.g. apartment building, a mosque or a hospital, are unlawful; he argues that in these cases Hamas bears legal responsibility for the harm to civilians, as enshrined in general principles of International Humanitarian Law. ITIC accused Hamas of making systematic use of protected civilian areas (including homes and mosques) for the hiding and storage of rockets, explosives and ammunition; using of civilian facilities (such as universities) for weapons development; calling on Palestinians to flock to targets which are expected to be attacked in order to form "human shields". ITIC states that such conduct contravenes the Laws of Armed Conflict and some of the practices above, e.g. Art. 8(2)(b)(xxiii) of the International Criminal Court, amount to a war crime.

The Amnesty report, issued in July 2009, found no evidence that Palestinian militants had forced civilians to stay in buildings being used for military purposes, contradicting Israeli claims that Hamas repeatedly used "human shields"; however, Amnesty assumed that Palestinian militant groups had endangered civilians by firing rockets from residential neighbourhoods and storing weapons in them. Human Rights Watch researchers said that they did not find instances in which Palestinian fighters had fired from within the midst of the civilian population; however, they pointed out that the International Crisis Group interviewed three Hamas fighters in January who said, "They had often fired rockets in close proximity to homes and from alleys, hoping that nearby civilians would deter Israel from responding." In the 2009 annual world report, HRW noted that Hamas had used human shields during the war. The report says:

"Palestinian armed groups unnecessarily placed Palestinian civilians at risk from retaliatory attacks by firing rockets from densely populated areas. Additionally, reports by news media and a nongovernmental organization indicate that in some cases, Palestinian armed groups intentionally hid behind civilians to unlawfully use them as shields to deter Israeli counter-attacks."

=== Use of the emblems of the Geneva Conventions ===
The Israeli security services chief Yuval Diskin suggested at the start of the offensive that Hamas militants were hiding at Gaza hospitals, some disguised as doctors and nurses. IDF probe, issued in April 2009, asserted that Hamas seniors, including Ismail Haniyeh, were taking over a ward of the Shifa Hospital, the Gaza Strip's largest, and set up a command center for the duration of the campaign. The Palestinian Authority's Health Ministry in Ramallah accused Gaza-based security services of turning several hospitals and Red-Crescent clinics in Gaza into interrogation and detention centers during and after the war and expelling medical staffers. ITIC stated that alleged evidence of improper use of protective emblems of the Geneva Conventions, as well as hiding in hospitals, constitute acts prohibited under the Laws of Armed Conflict, e.g., Article 44 of the First Geneva Convention. Irwin Cotler told The Jerusalem Post that misuse of humanitarian symbols, like using an ambulance to transport fighters or weapons or disguising oneself as a doctor in a hospital, amounts to war crimes.

The President of the Palestinian National Authority, Mahmoud Abbas, claimed that Hamas leadership used ambulances in order to escape to Egypt.

Amnesty International released a report on 1 July 2009, that rejected the charges by Israel that Hamas had systematically used medical facilities, vehicles and uniforms as a cover, stating that no evidence had been provided proving such actions.

=== Perfidy principle ===
Hamas fighters presumptively wore civilian clothes and concealed their weapons as fighting tactics. Militants not dressed in uniform while carrying out attacks feign civilian status and endanger innocent Palestinian civilians, according to the JCPA; this practice is called perfidy that is prohibited under International Humanitarian Law (Art. 37 of the Protocol I).

=== Extrajudicial violence ===
HRW points out that recorded cases of extrajudicial executions, torture, inhuman treatment and arbitrary detentions against alleged collaborators and spies are prohibited under Article 3 of Fourth Geneva Convention.

Hamas has been accused of executing several Fatah members and Palestinians suspected of collaborating with Israel. On 20 April 2009, HRW published its report titled Under Cover of War Hamas, Political Violence in Gaza, claiming at least 32 people were killed. Fatah officials in Ramallah reported Hamas executed at least 19 party members and more than 35 Palestinians. The Palestinian Center for Human Rights stated on 31 January that "it had credible reports that Hamas operatives killed six members of Fatah" and that another "35 were shot in the knees or beaten." The Hamas government in Gaza endorsed the killing of Israeli collaborators but denied allegations it had attacked members of Fatah during the conflict. A Hamas spokesperson said that the internal security service "was instructed to track collaborators and hit them hard." Hamas also said that "the government will show no mercy to collaborators who stab our people in the back, and they will be held accountable according to the law... if any collaborator is sentenced to death, we will not hesitate to carry it out." Hamas later accused Fatah of spying for Israel during the conflict, claiming that the espionage was what had enabled Israel to create massive damage and hit targets with precision.

== Proposal to change international law ==
The Prime Minister of Israel, Benjamin Netanyahu, speaking in light of the Goldstone Report, said that there were problems with international law and changes needed to be made. On 21 October 2009, he directed relevant ministries to look into it. Javier Solana, head of the EU's Common Foreign and Security Policy, expressed understanding of the call to change the laws governing warfare, saying that "in yesterday's world there were wars of armies against armies and there were laws and conventions that dealt with the conduct of such wars. It is necessary to invest thought to the changing situation in which there is asymmetry between fighting parties, a situation in which it is difficult to implement the classic/old rules of war." At the same time he stressed that "until new rules are in place we must obey the old ones".

Professor of International Law William Schabas chair of the International Institute for Criminal Investigation law told Israeli Army Radio he thought "the fact that Netanyahu says he wants to change the laws of war is almost an admission that Israel violated them". He predicted it was very unlikely the world would support such an initiative. Former Canadian justice minister Irwin Cotler said that the current laws of war are sufficient, but what really needs to be changed is their selective application to Israel alone.

== 2014 Israel-Gaza conflict ==
As Operation Protective Edge was conducted by Israel during the 2014 Israel–Gaza conflict, the same charges arose. Three weeks into the conflict, a "Joint Declaration by International Law Experts on Israel's Gaza Offensive", drafted by several international law scholars, appeared on Richard Falk's website and was undersigned by 300 signatories. The document states that:

we feel the intellectual and moral duty to denounce the grave violations, mystification and disrespect of the most basic principles of the laws of armed conflict and of the fundamental human rights of the entire Palestinian population committed during the ongoing Israeli offensive on the Gaza Strip. We also condemn the launch of rockets from the Gaza Strip, as every indiscriminate attack against civilians, regardless of the identity of the perpetrators, is not only illegal under international law but also morally intolerable. However, as also implicitly noted by the UN Human Rights Council in its Resolution of the 23th [sic] July 2014, the two parties to the conflict cannot be considered equal, and their actions – once again – appear to be of incomparable magnitude.

The Declaration called on the State of Palestine to join the International Criminal Court so that international crimes committed on that territory by all parties in conflict might be investigated and prosecuted, a move they said had hitherto been subject to pressures to discourage recourse to that institution.

== See also ==
- United Nations Fact Finding Mission on the Gaza Conflict
