= Jabalia refugee camp =

Refugee camp in the Gaza Strip, Palestine

Jabalia Camp مخيّم جباليا
- Refugee camp
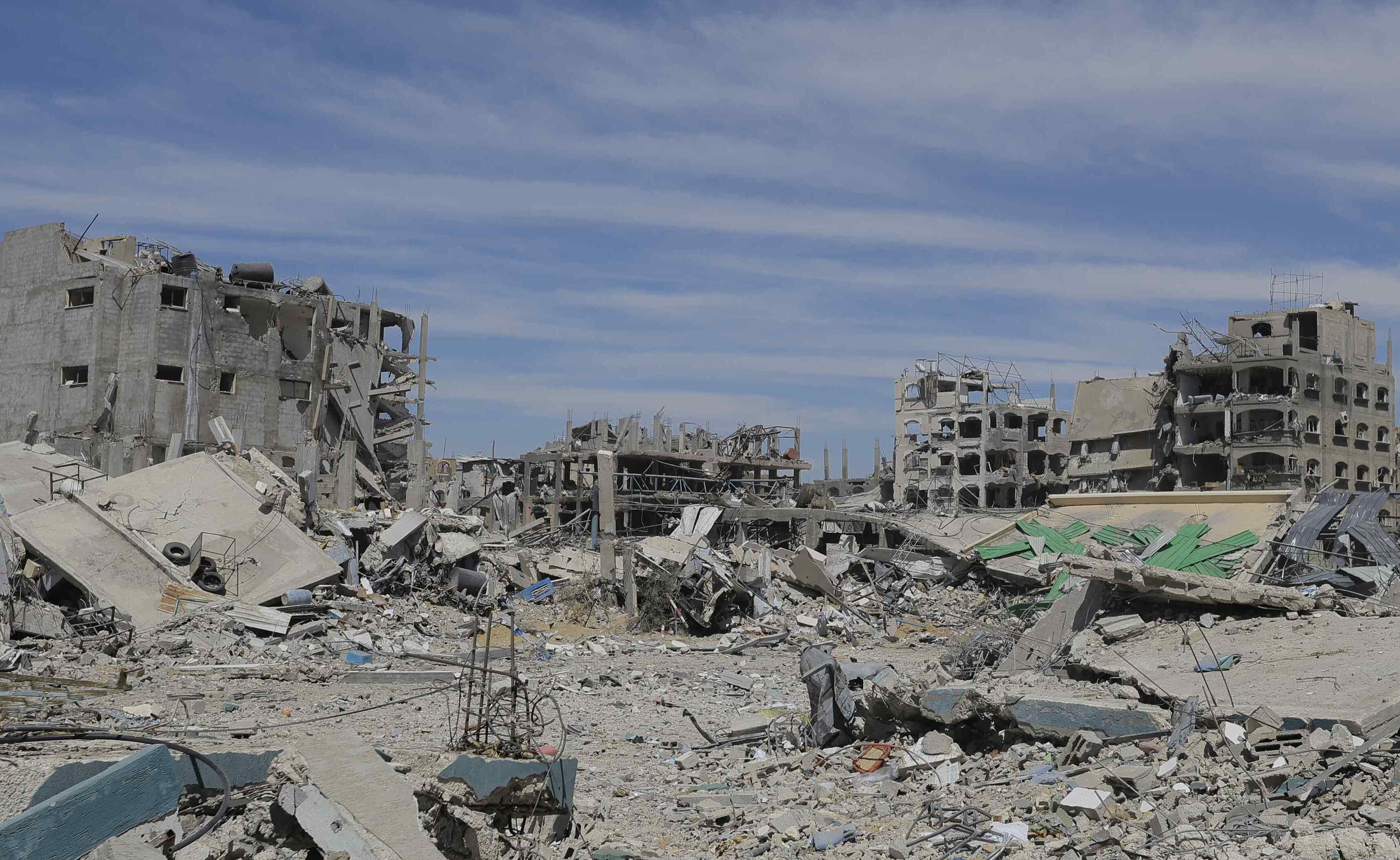
- Jabalia refugee camp in 2024, largely destroyed by Israeli bombing during the Gaza war and Gaza genocide

- Location of Jabalia Camp within Palestine
- Coordinates: 31°32′14″N 34°29′47″E
- Country: Palestine
- Governorate: North Gaza

Government
  - Type: Refugee Camp

Area
  - Total: 1.4 km^{2} (0.54 sq mi)

Population (2017)
  - Total: 49,462
  - Density: 35,000/km^{2} (92,000/sq mi)

Jabalia Camp (Arabic: مخيّم جباليا) (Note: also spelled Jabalya) is a Palestinian refugee camp in the North Gaza Governorate of the Gaza Strip, 3 kilometers (1.9 mi) north of Jabalia. Jabalia Camp was the largest refugee camp in Palestine, with more than 100,000 inhabitants. The camp only covers an area of 1.4 km^{2} (0.54 sq mi), making it one of the most densely populated areas in the Gaza Strip.

The camp was established in 1948 by the United Nations to house those displaced by the 1948 Palestinian expulsion. Originally composed of tents and other temporary structures, over time the population grew and the camp developed into a densely populated urban area with multi-story buildings.

Since the Six-Day War in 1967, the camp has been under Israeli occupation along with the rest of the Gaza Strip. Due to Israeli attacks during the Gaza war and Gaza genocide, the refugee camp has been mostly destroyed.

== History ==
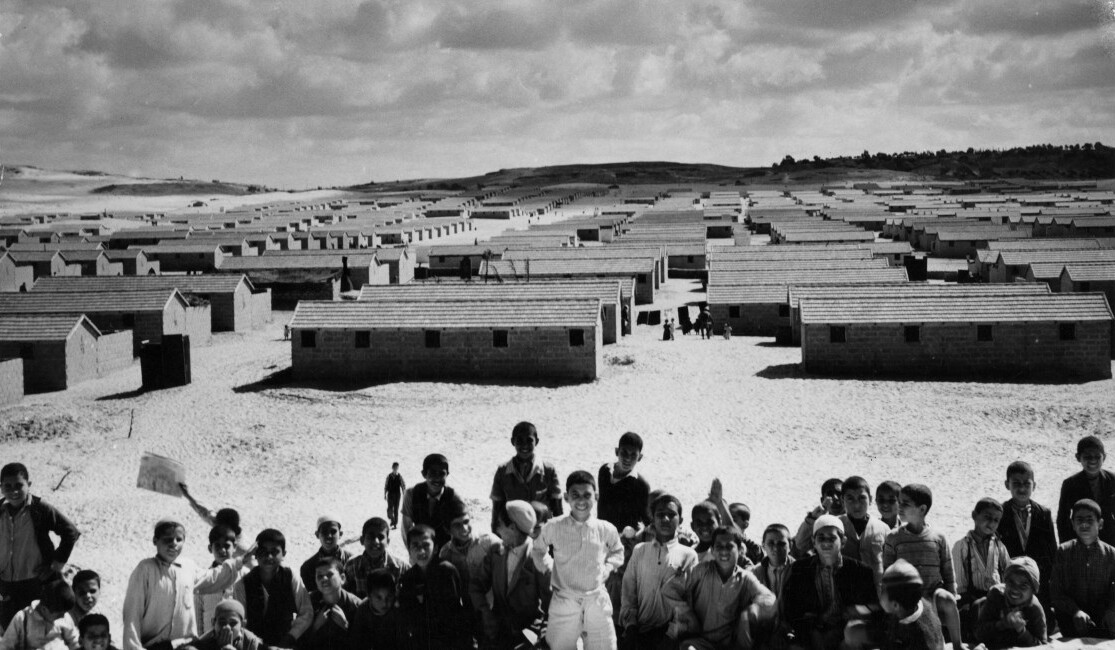
Jabalia refugee camp in 1950

Jabalia refugee camp was established in 1948 by the United Nations to house those displaced by the 1948 Palestinian expulsion. It was originally composed of tents and other temporary structures. Over time, the population grew and the camp developed into a densely populated urban area with multi-story buildings. Before the Gaza war, the camp was the largest refugee camp in Palestine, with a population of about 100,000.

Since the Six-Day War in 1967, the camp was under Israeli occupation along with the rest of the Gaza Strip. About 2,000 people were displaced from the camp.

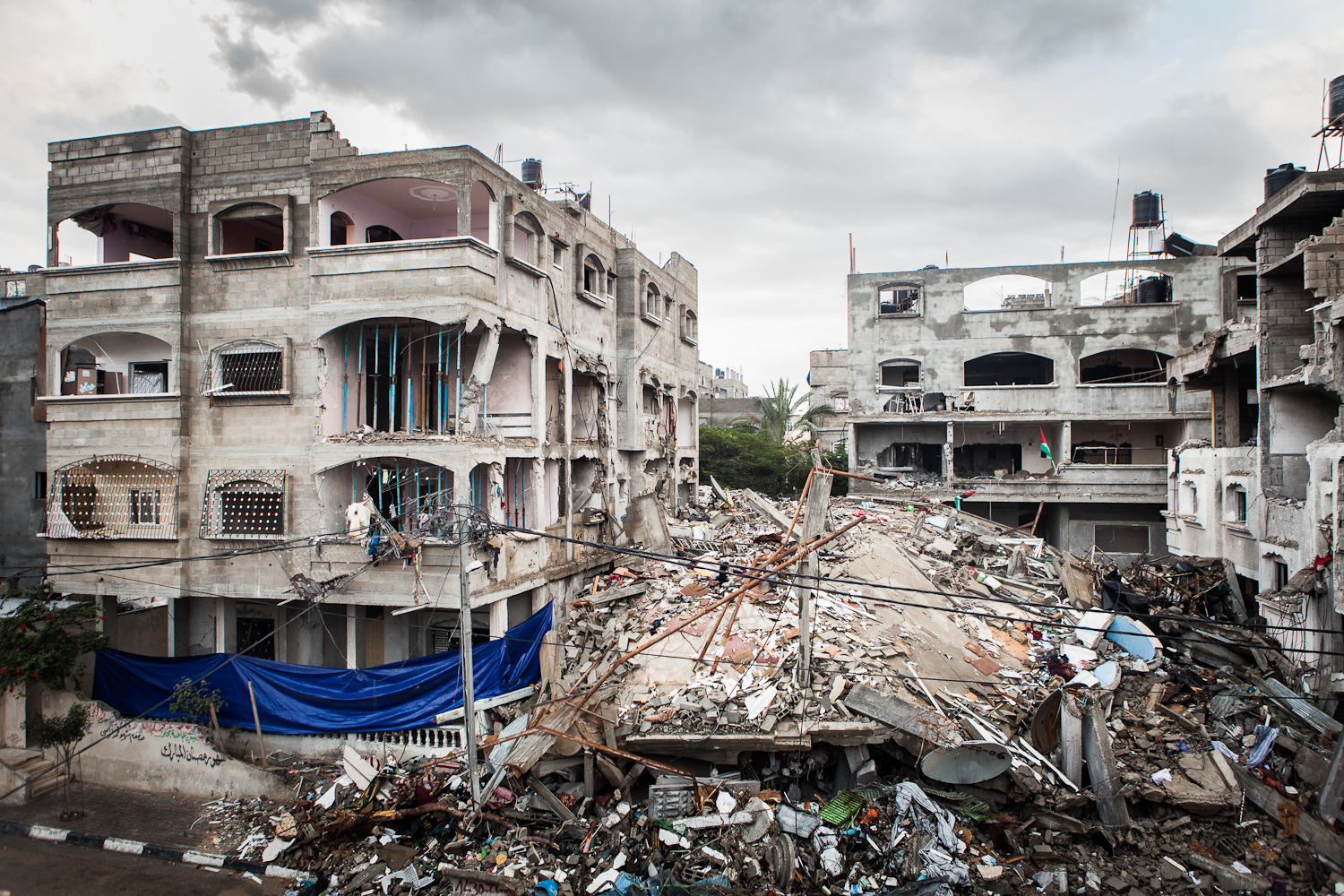
Jabalia refugee camp in 2012, with a building destroyed by Israeli bombing

The camp has been the scene of much violence in the Israeli–Palestinian conflict. The First Intifada in December 1987 began in Jabalia and the camp is considered by Israel to be a "Hamas stronghold". There was an extensive tunnel network beneath the camp. (Note: Culbertson, Shelly, Kobi Ruthenberg, Robert Lane, Nitay Lehrer, Mary E. Vaiana, and C. Ross Anthony, From Camps to Communities: Post-Conflict Shelter in Gaza. Santa Monica, CA: RAND Corporation, 2025. https://www.rand.org/pubs/research_reports/RRA3486-2.html. Quote: "Notable as a source of the first intifada, viewed by Israel as a "Hamas stronghold," and with an extensive under-ground tunnel network (Rosenberg, 2023; Berg,2024)") In 2004, during the Second Intifada, the Days of Penitence operation by the Israeli military resulted in over 155 Palestinian deaths and extensive damage to homes and agriculture, with the majority of the deaths and damage occurring in Jabalia camp.

The Al-Fakhura school shelling occurred in Jablia on January 6, 2009, during the First Gaza War.

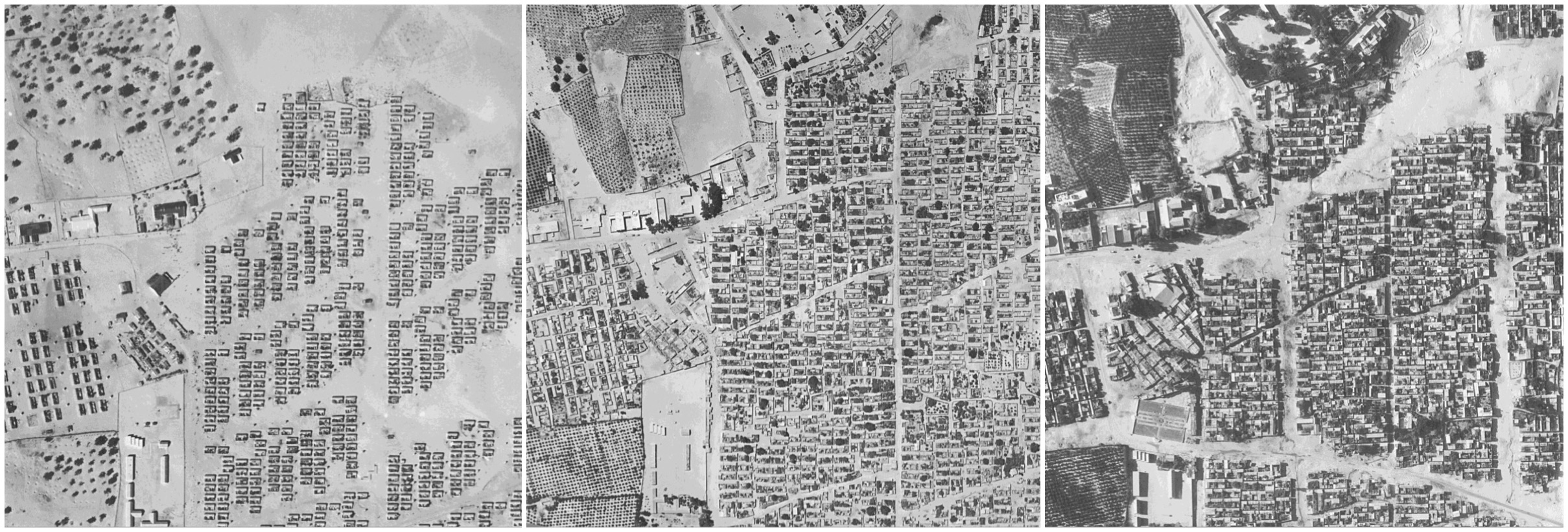
Aerial images of the camp from 1956 (left), 1967 (center), and 1971 (right)

=== 2014 Gaza War ===
During the 2014 Gaza War, Israeli artillery reportedly hit a UNWRA school in Jabalia Camp, killing at least 15 Palestinians sheltering there. A UN spokesman stated: "Last night, children were killed as they slept next to their parents on the floor of a classroom in a UN-designated shelter in Gaza. Children killed in their sleep; this is an affront to all of us, a source of universal shame. Today the world stands disgraced."

Protestors at the camp participated in the 2023 Gaza economic protests against poor economic conditions in Gaza and Hamas mismanagement.

Prior to the Gaza war, the UNRWA reported poor living conditions in the camp, including overcrowding, unsafe makeshift building add-ons, and "substandard conditions" for many who lived in the camp. Other problems faced by people living there included a high unemployment rate, electricity outages, contaminated water supply (90% of water was deemed "unfit for human consumption"), and unavailability of construction materials. There was also a high unemployment rate, which UNRWA attributed to the blockade, in place since 2005, which prevented most Palestinians in Gaza from working in Israel.

=== Gaza war and genocide (2023–present) ===
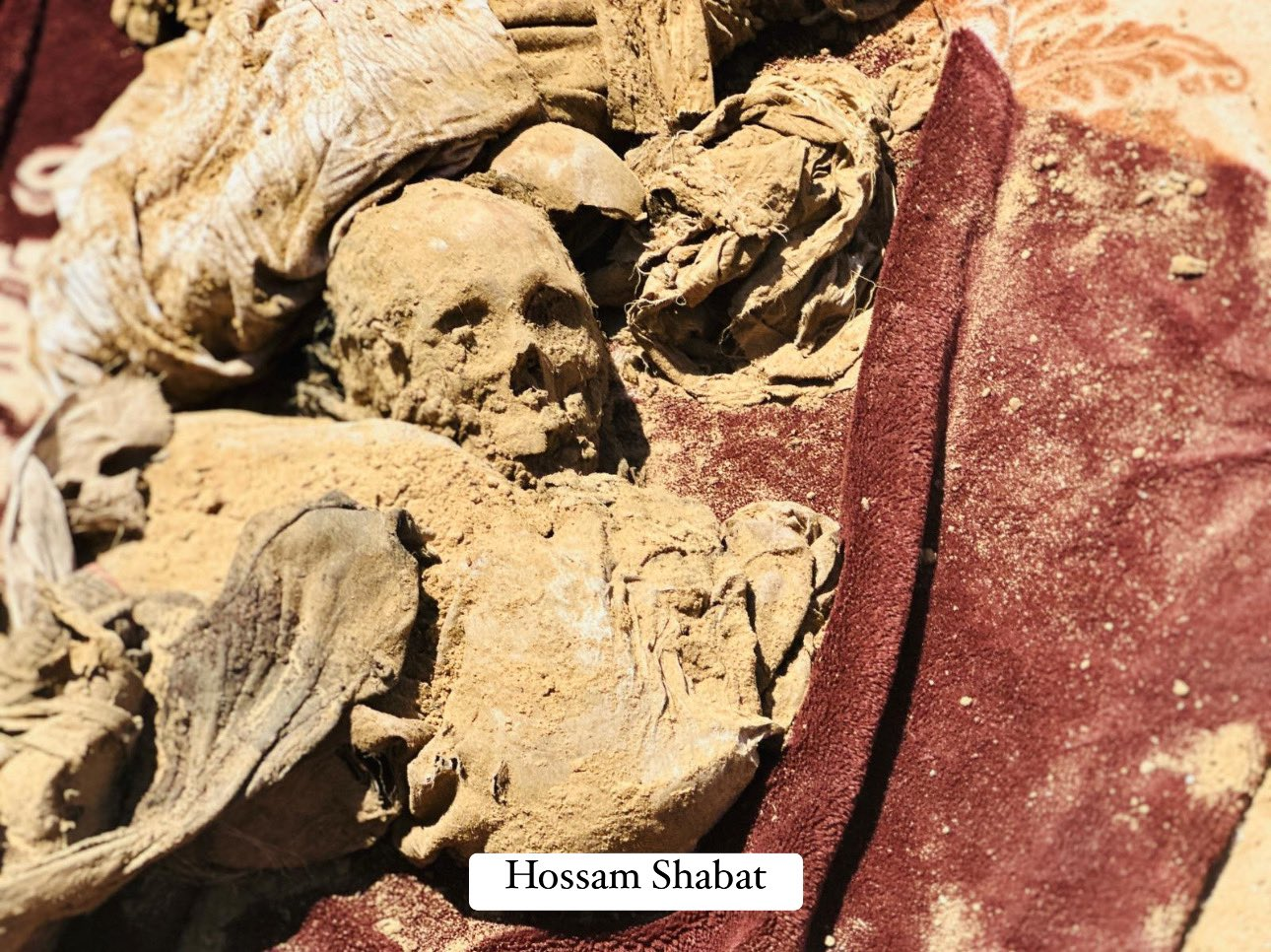
Mass graves in the Jabalia camp, 7 June 2024

The Jabalia refugee camp has been the target of multiple Israeli air strikes during the Gaza war and Gaza genocide. An Israeli air strike on 31 October 2023 killed at least 50 Palestinians and trapped more than 100 beneath the rubble, according to the Gaza Health Ministry. The Indonesia Hospital said most casualties were women and children. Survivors and videos detailed massive destruction of homes and businesses, and the Gaza Interior Ministry stated the camp had been "completely destroyed," with preliminary estimates of about 400 wounded or dead. IDF spokesperson Daniel Hagari confirmed that Israeli fighter jets attacked the refugee camp, stating that the attack killed a Hamas commander who led the October 7 attacks, along with dozens of Palestinian militants, and destroyed Palestinian tunnels. Hamas said none of its commanders were present and that Israel was using these claims as an excuse for the attack.

==== 2024 ====
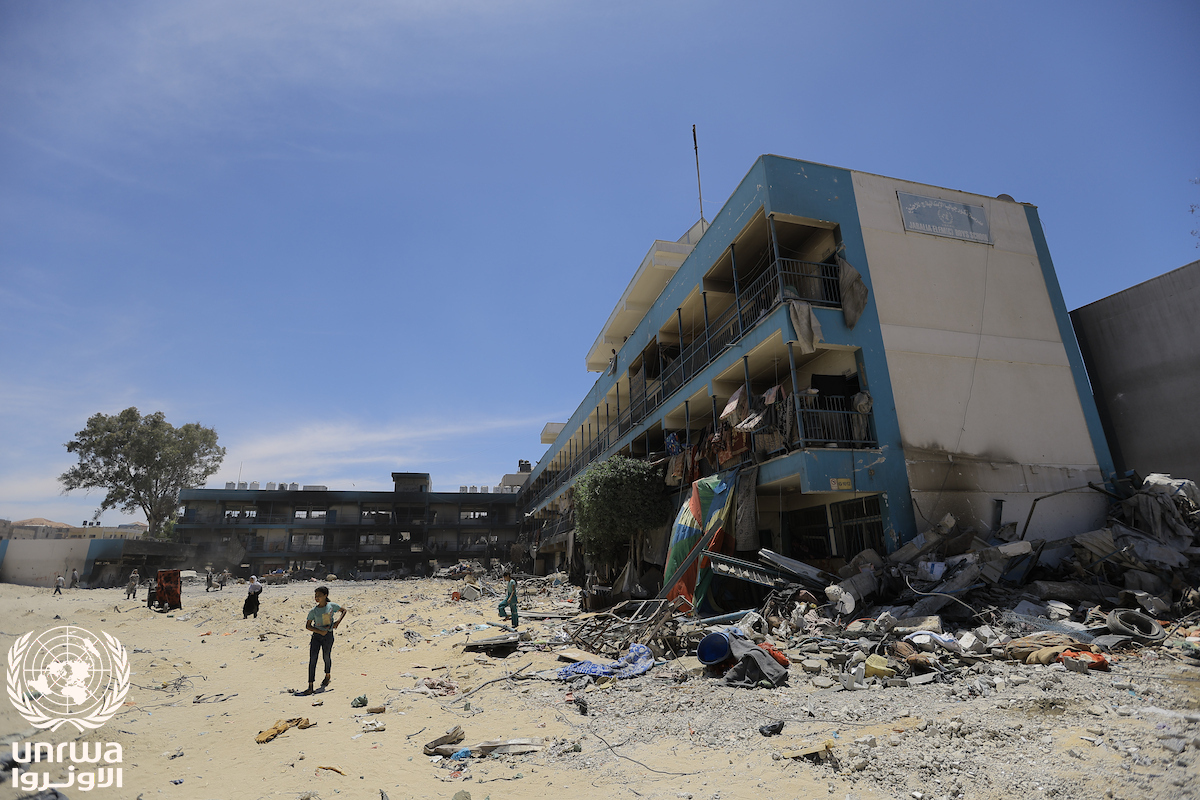
The ruin of Jabalia Boys' Preparatory School A in May 2024

The Israeli army withdrew from the refugee camp on 6 February 2024. Al Jazeera journalist Anas al-Sharif reported that all that remained was total destruction, with one resident of the area stating there was "not a single habitable house" remaining in Jabalia. On 12 May 2024, Israeli forces reportedly attacked the refugee camp again. Footage showed Israel dropping bombs on the camp, and using tanks to enter it. Following Israel's withdrawal from the camp in late May 2024, as much as 70 percent of the camp was said to be in ruins. The Israeli military said it destroyed over 10 kilometers of tunnels beneath Jabalia that it said the militants used. Civil defence crews reportedly uncovered 120 bodies in the aftermath of the withdrawal. In June 2024, Palestinian municipal authorities declared the camp a disaster area. In October 2024, the Israeli military attacked the camp, killing at least 33 people and wounding 85, including children. In December 2024, it was reported that there were very few families left in the camp.

== Notable people ==
- Atef Abu Saif, writer
- Izzeldin Abuelaish, physician
- Mahmoud al-Mabhouh, Hamas commander
- Anas Al-Sharif, journalist
- Hussam Abu Safiya, doctor

== See also ==
- Gaza Ghetto, a 1984 documentary film about the life of a family living in the camp
