= Al-Fakhura school shelling =

2009 Israeli bombing of a UN-operated school for refugees

- Part of the Gaza War (2008–2009)
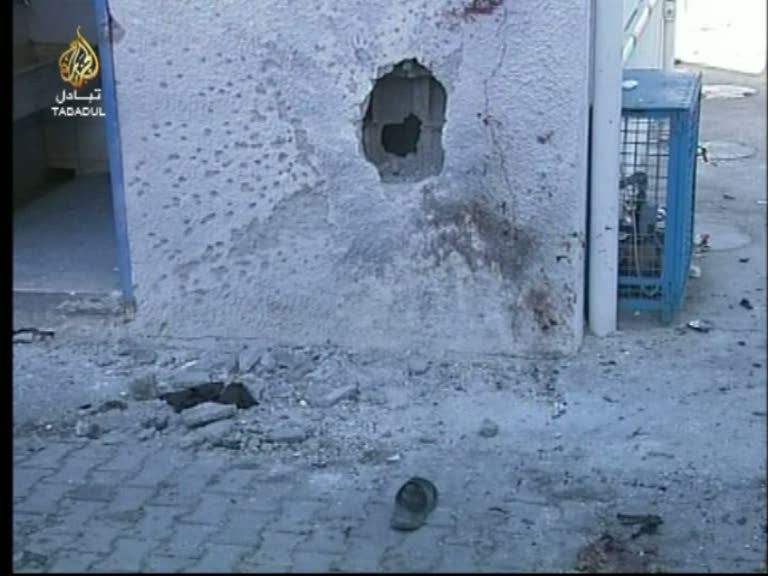
- Wall damaged in the shelling
- Location: 31.5377°N 34.4980°E; Near Al-Fakhura school, Jabalia Camp, Gaza Strip
- Date: 6 January 2009
- Attack type: artillery shells
- Deaths: between 12 and 43
- Injuries: 55 (Chan 4, Indep); 44 (DCI); 12 (IDF)
- Perpetrator: Israel Defense Forces

The al-Fakhura school shelling was an Israeli military strike that took place during the Gaza War on 6 January 2009 near a United Nations-run school in the Jabalia Camp in the Gaza Strip. According to the UN and several non-governmental organizations (NGOs), more than 40 people were killed. Israel reported the death toll as nine Hamas militants and three noncombatants with senior IDF officers stating that the death toll published by Hamas was "grossly exaggerated". Israel stated it fired on the school in response to militant gunfire believed to be coming from al-Fakhura. A UN inquiry said that there was no firing from within the school and there were no explosives within the school, but could not establish if militants fired from the vicinity of the school.

== Overview ==
On 6 January 2009, Palestinians were using the al-Fakhura school run by UNRWA as a shelter. Most were from northern Gaza near Beit Lahiya, after being ordered to leave by the IDF for their own safety. Two Israeli tanks fired shells which exploded outside the school.

== Accounts of the shelling ==
=== Israeli accounts ===
==== Initial Israeli accounts ====
The IDF originally said that Hamas militants were inside the school, firing rockets and mortars. The next day, it was said that a mortar was fired from the playground. The IDF stated that among the Hamas gunmen inside the school were Imad and Hassan Abu-Askar, known to the IDF as Hamas rocket-launching operatives, and said to have found their bodies following the attack. The Israeli military declared that it responded with a single shell at the school, resulting in an explosion because Hamas had booby-trapped the school.

An Israeli government spokesman said that "the incident was a 'very extreme example of how Hamas operates'", and "If you take over – I presume with guns – a UN facility. If you hold the people there as hostages, you shoot out of that facility at Israeli soldiers in the neighbourhood, then you receive incoming fire". An Israeli Ministry of Foreign Affairs spokesperson said that a Hamas squad was firing mortar shells from the immediate vicinity of the school.

On 6 January, the IDF released a video footage from 2007, showing Palestinian militants firing from the school compound and carrying a rocket launcher with them as they flee the scene.

According to Haaretz, a preliminary investigation found that the army's location system to pinpoint launch sites indicated that Hamas militants had launched a Qassam rocket into Israel from within a yard adjacent to the schoolyard. The troops had intended to launch a smart missile but a technical malfunction made this impossible. Instead mortar shells were used. Due to a GPS error margin of 30 meters, one of three rounds hit the UNRWA building. Two of the rounds hit the yard used to launch rockets into Israel, killing two members of Hamas' military wing.

==== Subsequent Israeli account ====
On April 22, 2009, the IDF announced the results of its internal investigation on Operation Cast Lead. The report found that Hamas had fired mortar shells at a position 80 meters from the school and that the IDF used "minimal and proportionate retaliatory fire" afterward. It also concluded that the IDF "did not, at any time, fire with the deliberate intention to hit a UN vehicle or facility" at any point in the conflict.

=== Palestinian accounts ===
A Hamas spokesman said allegations that militants had used the school to attack Israeli forces were baseless. Abdel Minaim Hasan who lost his eldest daughter, Lina, 11, wept by her body wrapped in a Hamas flag. The New York Times reported that he cried out: "From now on I am Hamas! ... I choose resistance!" He also cursed the Arab nations, shouting, "The Arabs are doing nothing to protect us!" Huda Deed who lost nine members of her extended family, ages 3 to 25, was also weeping and standing before the bodies of the dead remarked, "Look, they've lined them up like a ruler!" When asked for an interview by Al-Aqsa TV, the Hamas channel, she refused. Mushir al-Masri, a senior Hamas official who emerged from hiding to attend the funeral, commended the dead and called them martyrs. According to The New York Times, some parents greeted him by shaking his hand while others stared at him coldly.

=== United Nations accounts ===
John Ging, Director of UNRWA operations, said that three shells had landed "at the perimeter of the school". He said Israel knew it was targeting a UN facility. OCHA reported on 6 January that the missile strikes had been outside the school. The report stated that UNRWA had rejected Israeli statements that the school was being used to fire mortars at the Israeli army. In its report of the following day, however, OCHA said the school itself had been shelled. On 2 February, OCHA corrected the statement, clarifying that the shelling, and all of the fatalities, took place outside rather than inside the school. OCHA and UNRWA denied that they had ever verbally accused Israel of hitting the school. Several news agencies said that the UN had backtracked from its original statement that the strike had hit the school.

On 8 January, a UNRWA spokesman said that the IDF admitted that they had not responded to shelling originating from the school, and said that the attack on the UN site was unintentional. They also said that all the video footage released by the IDF of militants firing from inside the school was from 2007 and not from the incident itself.

According to an Israeli Government report published in July 2009, the UN Board of Inquiry was unable to reach any conclusion whether or not mortars were being fired and directed against the IDF from near to the school...[the Board] was not in a position to assess whether [more precise] means of response was available to the IDF at the time and, if it was not, the length and consequences of any delay until it might have become available.

The UNHRC fact-finding mission report in September 2009 criticized the choice of weapons for the counterstrike, saying that the use of mortars in this setting would have brought about certainty that civilians would be injured and killed. The report stated that the IDF had violated Article 57, Protocol I of the Geneva Convention, in excess of proportionality, finding in conclusion:

"... the Mission is of the view the deployment of at least four mortar shells to attempt to kill a small number of specified individuals in a setting where large numbers of civilians were going about their daily business and 1,368 people were sheltering nearby cannot meet the test of what a reasonable commander would have determined to be an acceptable loss of civilian life for the military advantage sought."

The same report expanded on the identities of two fatalities of the attack named by the IDF as Hamas operatives: Imad Abu Askar and Hassan Abu Askar. Both were sons of Muhammed Fouad Abu Askar, identified by the report as a Hamas member and holding the civilian position of Director-General for Religious Affairs. He denies involvement in armed militant activities. Mr. Abu Askar says that no person named Hassan exists in his family tree. The report speculates that it is a misidentification by the IDF of Khaled Abu Askar, Mr. Abu Askar's 19-year-old son and confirmed fatality in the attack. This person does not appear to be mentioned in any official IDF communications. The other, Imad Abu Askar, alleged by numerous Israeli officials to be "a well-known member" of Hamas and "of some significance in rocket launching operations", was reported to be a 13-year-old boy.

The report admits the possibility of Palestinian militant activity in the area, but states that the credibility of Israel's government was "damaged by the series of inconsistencies and factual inaccuracies", citing "erroneous allegations of who specifically was hit". The report regards the government's version of events on January 6 as being "erroneous" and "a result of the immediate outcry", factually conflicting with later official Israeli investigations published on April 22. It also points out the incorrect identities of the dead, and that none of the seven names made available by the CLA through the press corroborate with the identities produced by the investigation's findings. Citing these and other incongruities, it describes the version stated by Israeli authorities as giving "the impression of either profound confusion or obfuscation".

In the initial response to the UNHRC fact-finding mission report, Israeli Government replied that the committee findings reflect the oversimplistic approach to complex military challenges during the fighting, implying that the mission members did not possess the information that was known to the force's commander at the time of the attack regarding the immediate threat, weapon's availability and potential risks to civilians.

According to a UN Board of Inquiry there was no firing from within the school and no explosives within the school. The Board could not establish with certainty whether there had been any firing from the vicinity of the school.

=== Eyewitness accounts ===
According to Mouin Gasser, a 45-year-old teacher, the area around the school was hit four times in about two minutes by the shells that landed just outside the school. Gasser said that he did not see any militants in the area.

Hanan Abu Khajib said that Hamas militants fired just outside the school compound, likely from the secluded courtyard of a house across the street some 25 yards from the school, and that Israeli return fire minutes later landed outside the school along its southwest wall, killing two Hamas fighters.

Two unnamed residents, who spoke to an Associated Press reporter by phone on condition of anonymity for fear of reprisal, said a group of militants had been firing mortar shells rounds from a street close to the school. Jonathan Miller wrote in a Channel 4 story that "local residents in the street told me that militants had been firing rockets – as the IDF stated – and having been targeted in retaliatory fire by the IDF, they ran down the street past the school." Residents of the neighborhood said two brothers who were Hamas fighters were in the area at the time of the attack. The Israeli military identified the brothers as Imad Abu Asker and Hassan Abu Asker, and said they had been killed. Residents also said that the mortar fire had not come from the school compound, but from elsewhere in the neighborhood.

Shadi Abu Shanar who worked as a guard at the school said: "Suddenly I heard a number of explosions at the gate. I went out onto the street and found dead bodies and wounded people lying on the ground. Most of them were cut into pieces. The street was full of people. I was about to pass out because of what I saw. The shells landed in a range of 20 to 40 meters around the school. The school was full of people."

Four witness statements collected by Defence for Children International-Palestine section indicate that the area was quiet, and that adults and children were going about their daily business.

== Casualties ==
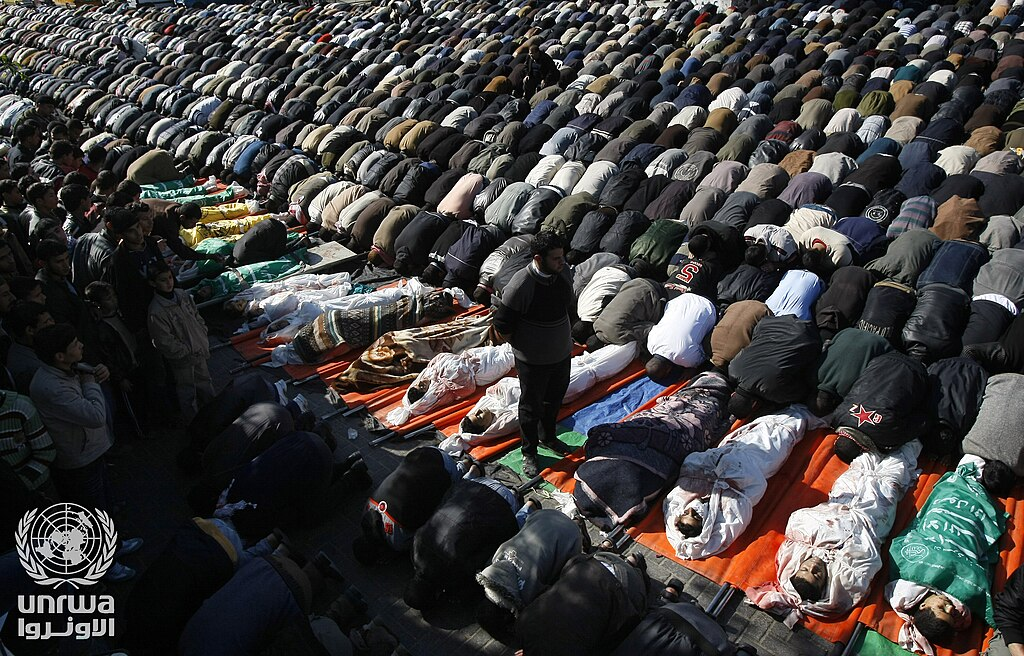
Palestinian mourners pray on January 7, 2009 near the bodies of the victims.

Some reports state over 40 people were killed in the incident, but the IDF state that 12 people died, 9 of them Hamas militants.The Guardian stated that, while the school itself was targeted, the majority of those killed were not in the school but in the playground and nearby street.

On 15 February 2009, The Jerusalem Post published the IDF account of the Palestinian fatalities in the incident. According to IDF's Gaza Coordination and Liaison Administration (CLA), 12 Palestinians were killed – 9 Hamas operatives and 3 noncombatants. The CLA also stated that the IDF was returning fire after coming under attack, that its shells did not hit the school compound, and that this has been acknowledged by the UN. Colonel Moshe Levi, head of the CLA said that: "From the beginning, Hamas stated that 42 people were killed, but we could see from our surveillance that only a few stretchers were brought in to evacuate people".

The Jerusalem Post quotes CLA officials stating that on the day of the incident officers from the CLA contacted the Palestinian Health Ministry and were told that 3 Palestinian civilians had been killed and that Hamas was hiding the identities of the remaining casualties.

== Initial reactions ==
- Secretary-General of the United Nations Ban Ki-moon condemned the attack, calling it "totally unacceptable".
- Bush administration Press Secretary Dana Perino stated just after the incident that "I saw the reports about the school. I don't have any information about that. I think that we should not jump to conclusions and we should wait to find out what the evidence says... What we do know is that Hamas often hides amongst innocents and uses innocent people, including children, as human shields."
- The incident prompted President-elect Barack Obama to break his silence over the 2008–2009 Israel–Gaza conflict, saying that "[t]he loss of civilian life in Gaza and Israel is a source of deep concern for me".
- British Prime Minister Gordon Brown said that the incident and the fighting preceding it represents "the darkest moment yet for the Middle East".
- The British Foreign Minister David Miliband said, "I've just landed in New York and been told of the terrible, shocking news of 30 further civilian deaths in a UN school. I think that this devastating news underlines the need for the immediate ceasefire that the prime minister and I have been calling for."

The New York Times, Al-Jazeera, and the San Francisco Chronicle linked the attack on al-Fakhura school with a possible cease-fire or withdrawal of Israeli troops from Gaza. In an analysis of Israeli media strategy in the 2008–2009 Israel–Gaza conflict, The New York Times and San Francisco Chronicle compared the killing of the civilians at al-Fakhura to the 1996 shelling of Qana and the Qana airstrike in Lebanon. The New York Times described these three events as "sudden events that can throw off so many careful calculations and come to symbolize the horrors of war". The New York Times said that the al-Fakhura killings "will inevitably turn stomachs all over the world and increase pressure on Israel for an early cease-fire". Al Jazeera said that the event has already caused "mounting pressure [on Israel] to agree a ceasefire". The San Francisco Chronicle said that "the clock might start ticking for Israel to withdraw its troops."

== See also ==
- UNRWA shelters shelled during the 2014 Israel–Gaza conflict
- Incidents in the Gaza War (2008–2009)
- International law and the Arab-Israeli conflict
- Media coverage of the Israeli-Palestinian conflict
- Israel and the United Nations
- Palestine and the United Nations
