= Forest of Noise =

2024 poetry collection by Mosab Abu Toha

- Author: Mosab Abu Toha
- Genre: Poetry
- Publisher: Alfred A. Knopf
- Publication date: October 15, 2024
- Pages: 96
- ISBN: 978-0593803974

Forest of Noise is a 2024 poetry collection by Mosab Abu Toha. A book chronicling Abu Toha's direct witnessing of the Gaza genocide, it was awarded the 2025 Brooklyn Public Library Nonfiction Prize.

== Critical reception ==
Literary Hub wrote that "Much of Forest of Noise, implicitly or explicitly, confronts us with the need to we examine what it means to be screaming in the language of one’s torturers at a world that views their suffering as an inescapable, even necessary part of how it functions."

Sojourners stated that "for Christians in the West, Forest of Noise is a direct confrontation. Its poems cut through our shallow excuses and demand an answer to an uncomfortable question: How can you claim that all people are made in the image of God and then allow that image to be buried under the rubble?"
