= Mosab =

Mosab is a given name. Notable people with the given name include:

- Mosab Amrani (born 1987), Moroccan-Dutch kickboxer
- Mosab Balhous (born 1983), Syrian footballer
- Mosab Abu Toha (born 1992), Palestinian writer, poet, scholar, and librarian
- Mosab Hassan Yousef (born 1978), American author and former militant
