= Ibrahim al-Makadmeh =

Palestinian militant leader (1952–2003)

Ibrahim al-Makadmeh (Arabic: ابراهيم المقادمة) (1952 – 8 March 2003) was a Palestinian and Hamas senior leader in the Gaza Strip who was killed by Israeli forces. Makadmeh, one of Hamas' founders and a leader of the group's military wing, was accused of engineering several attacks that killed 28 Israelis.

== Biography ==
Al-Makadmeh, age 52, was the father of seven children. He was a devoted preacher and political activist opposed to the Israeli occupation of Palestine. He was born in 1952, four years after his family fled from the village of Yibna, south-west of Jerusalem, when Israel was created. Al-Makadmeh's family fled to the refugee camps at Bureij and later moved to Jabalia.

After graduating from secondary school in Jabalia, al-Makadmeh studied dentistry in Egypt where he adopted the Islamist ideology of the Muslim Brotherhood. When he returned to Gaza, al-Makadmeh began organizing the Palestinian Islamist movement and a few years later, he and Sheikh Ahmed Yassin founded Hamas, the Palestinian Islamic resistance movement.

In 1984, the Israelis arrested, charged and convicted al-Makadmeh with possessing and supplying arms to Palestinian militants. During his eight years in Israeli prisons he allegedly was subjected to physical and psychological torture.

In 1992, he was released from prison and began working as a dentist at the Shifa Hospital in Gaza while continuing his Hamas activities. His harsh criticisms of Palestinian Authority corruption and the Oslo Accords, as well as vocal support for Hamas attacks on Israel, led the Palestinian Authority to arrest him several times. He was detained for three years without charge or trial and allegedly was tortured in custody, this time by Palestinian authorities.

== Killing ==
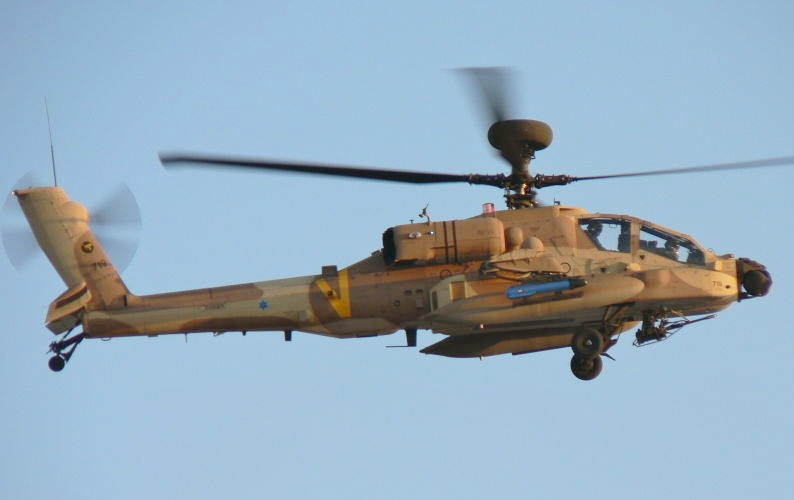
Israeli Air Force AH-64D Saraph

Al-Makadmeh and three of his aides were killed when three Israeli Apache helicopter gunships fired up to five missiles at the car he was in as it drove down a street in downtown Gaza City. Makadmeh's killing came after Hamas claimed responsibility for an attack Friday on a Jewish settlement that left two dead, and a Haifa bus 37 massacre which killed 17 civilians.

According to family members, al-Makadmeh anticipated his killing by Israel for his leadership role in Hamas. A few days before his death, he said, "Our homeland will not be liberated and our people will not be freed from Jewish enslavement and occupation without sacrifices. Freedom has a price, and the price is blood."

The Israel Defense Forces announced the killing saying that al-Makadmeh "deserved liquidation", for "masterminding terrorist activities against Israeli civilians and soldiers." A Hamas spokesman in Gaza dismissed the Israeli allegations as "cheap lies", claiming that al-Makadmeh was a political leader.

Israeli Defence Minister Shaul Mofaz said that Israel would go after "other leaders" from Hamas in the Gaza Strip.

== See also ==
- Massacre of Ibrahim al-Maqadma Mosque
- Israeli–Palestinian conflict
