= Haifa bus 37 suicide bombing =

2003 terrorist attack by Palestinian militants in Haifa, Israel

- Part of the Second Intifada militancy campaign
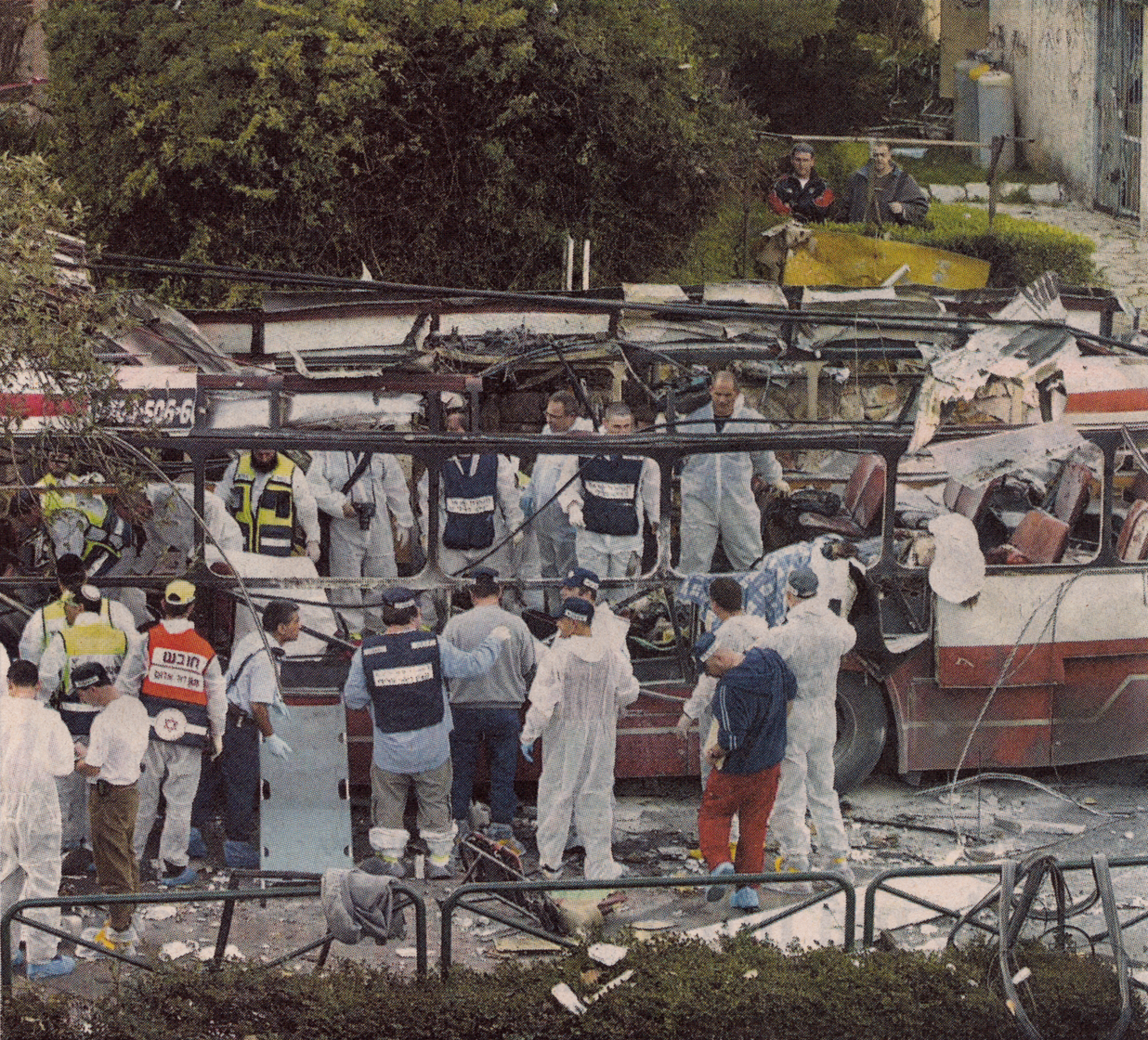
- The attack aftermath

- The attack site
- Native name: הפיגוע בקו 37
- Location: 32°47′50″N 34°59′03″E; Haifa, Israel
- Date: 5 March 2003; 23 years ago
- Target: Bus
- Attack type: Suicide attack
- Weapon: Suicide vest
- Deaths: 17 (+ 1 bomber)
- Injuries: 53
- Perpetrator: Hamas
- No. of participants: 1

Hamas carried out a suicide bombing on 5 March 2003 on an Egged bus in Haifa, Israel. 17 passengers were killed in the attack and 53 were injured. Many of the victims were university students from nearby Haifa University.

The bomber was 20-year-old Mahmoud Umdan Salim Qawasmeh, a student at the Palestine Polytechnic University. An Israeli Arab resident of Haifa who helped plan the attack was also tried and sentenced to life imprisonment for his involvement.

== The attack ==
The attack occurred on 5 March 2003, when a suicide bomber from Hebron detonated a bomb hidden underneath his clothes on a bus carrying many children and teenagers on their way home from school. The bus exploded as it was pulling out of station on Moriyah Street, a main traffic artery near the Carmeliya neighborhood, heading from the Bat Galim neighborhood to the University of Haifa. The explosion occurred while the bus was packed with commuters. The attack killed 17 people and wounded 53. Police said the bomb, strapped to the bomber's body, was laden with metal shrapnel in order to maximize the number of injuries.

== Aftermath ==
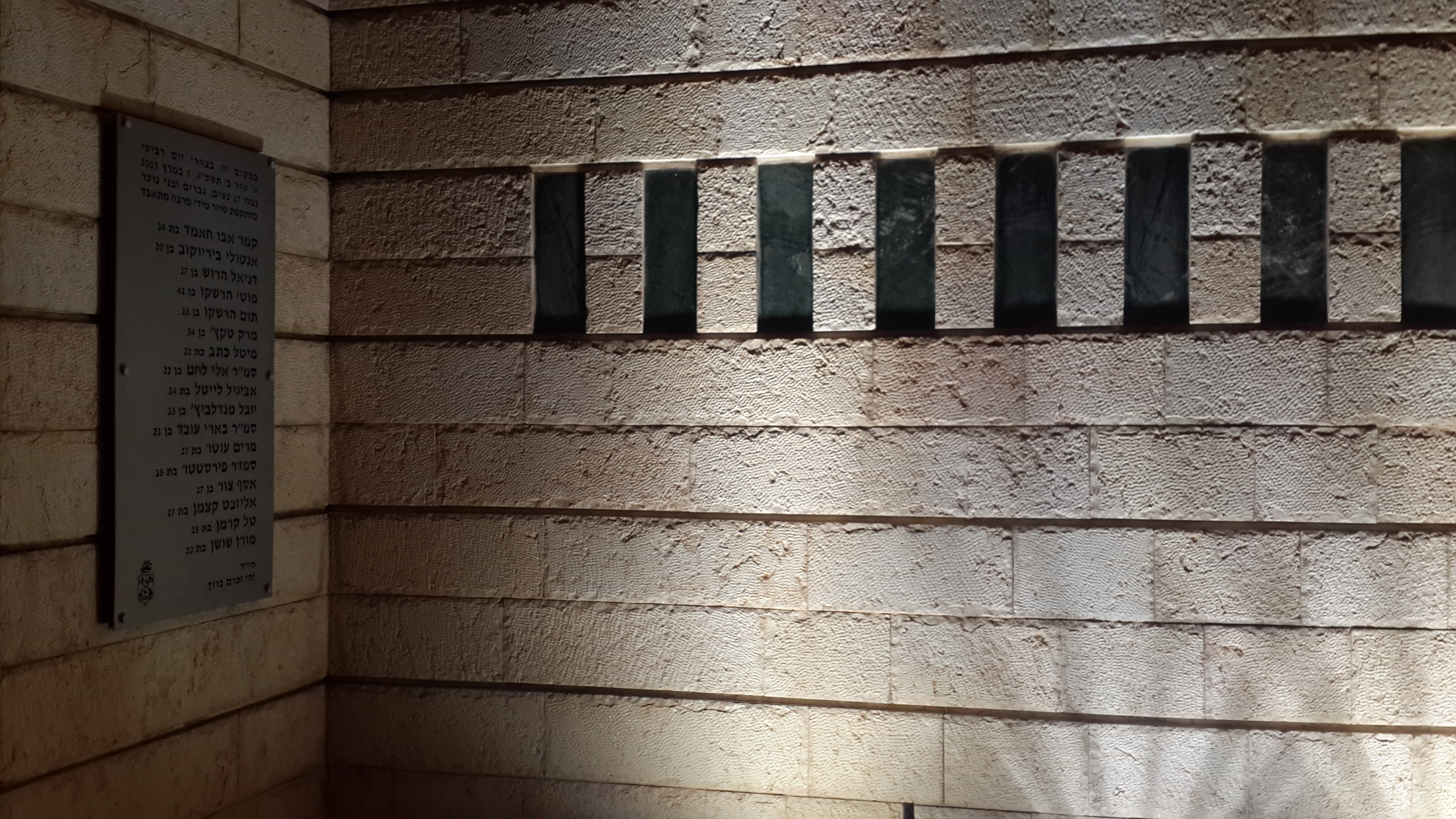
Memorial for the attack victims

Spokesmen from Hamas and Islamic Jihad praised the attack. "We will not stop our resistance," said Abd al-Aziz Rantisi of Hamas. "We are not going to give up in the face of the daily killing of Palestinians." In response, Israeli helicopters killed Hamas leader Ibrahim al-Makadmeh and three of his bodyguards.

On 18 October 2011, Israel released three people convicted of planning the attack, Maedh Waal Taleb Abu Sharakh (19 life sentences), Majdi Muhammad Ahmed Amr (19 life sentences) and Fadi Muhammad Ibrahim al-Jaaba (18 life sentences), as part of the Gilad Shalit prisoner exchange.

== See also ==
- List of Hamas suicide attacks
