= Ibrahim al-Maqadma Mosque attack =

Air strike during the Gaza War (2008–2009)

Ibrahim al-Maqadna Mosque strike
- Location: 31.504°N 34.464°E; Beit Lahia, Gaza, Palestine
- Date: January 3, 2009
- Attack type: airstrike
- Deaths: 16 (including 6 children)
- Injuries: more than 60
- Perpetrator: Israeli Air Force or Israeli Defence Force

The 2009 Ibrahim al-Maqadma Mosque strike or massacre of Ibrahim al-Maqadma Mosque occurred on January 3, 2009, as part of the 2008–2009 Israel–Gaza War when the Israeli Air Forces launched a missile and hit the Martyr Ibrahim al-Maqadma Mosque in Beit Lahia in the Gaza Strip during the evening prayers (Maghrib prayer).

== The attack ==
At 5:20 pm on January 3, the IDF attacked the western entrance of Ibrahim al-Maqadma Mosque in Beit Lahiya at the time of Maghrib prayer. Witnesses said over 200 Palestinian men were praying at the mosque at that time.

At least 16 people, including six children were killed, and more than 60 wounded. Almost all those of were killed were still inside the mosque building at the time of death. Paramedics arriving at the scene described seeing "people cut to pieces". One dead child's leg was blown off by the explosion and later found on the roof.

A paramedic interviewed by The Observer said there was no evidence of any militants among the casualties.

The mosque was in a densely populated residential area, close to Kamal Edwan Hospital and the locals did not expect this area to get hit. Neighboring homes were also damaged. The locals had combined Maghrib and Isha prayers, as was customary in times of distress. The mosque is named after a founder of Hamas "Ibrahim al-Makadmeh" who was killed by the Israelis in 2004.

== Aftermath ==
Israel accused Hamas of using mosques to hide weapons and ammunition. The IDF Spokesperson's Unit published videos showing secondary explosions that occurred after they had targeted mosques with missiles, alleging these were caused by the weapons and ammunition hidden inside of them. In July 2009, the Israel Ministry of Foreign Affairs released a report stating that, "the IDF inquiry revealed that the mosque was not attacked at all." The report also stated that "the individuals reported as killed in this incident were in fact killed in other incidents not involving the mosque. Further, the supposed 'civilians' who were casualties of the attack were in fact Hamas operatives killed while fighting against the IDF." It was also noted that IDF rules of engagement "expressly forbid attacks directed against sacred places, unless they are used for military purposes."

The report of the UN Fact-Finding Mission on the Gaza Conflict (a.k.a. the Goldstone report) stated that the Israelis intentionally bombed the al-Maqadmah mosque on the outskirts of Jabilyah when between 200 and 300 men and women attended for their evening prayer, with fifteen people dying. The South African jurist Richard Goldstone, who led the fact-finding mission, said "Assuming that weapons were stored in the mosque, it would not be a war crime to bomb it at night... It would be a war crime to bomb it during the day when 350 people are praying". Judge Goldstone referred to the incident as a case where there is no other possible interpretation for what could have occurred other than a deliberate targeting of civilians. The report concluded that the al-Maqadma mosque was hit during evening prayers by an Israeli missile, killing at least 15 people and injuring 40 others. The report noted that there was no evidence that the mosque had been used to store weapons or that it was being used by Palestinian militants at the time. The report further described response of the Israeli Government, alleging that the mosque was not attacked at all, as "unsatisfactory and demonstrably false". Researcher of the Jerusalem Center for Public Affairs (JCPA) colonel (res.) Jonathan Halevi asserted that in the course of the inquiry the commission did not consider other possibilities, such as a drone strike aimed at a group of militants nearby that could be supported by the fact that the blast hit just outside the mosque. He also stated that "[a]n examination of freely accessible Palestinian sources shows that the casualties in this incident were terrorist operatives", specifically naming 7 out of the 15 dead. According to witness statements, between 200 and 300 people were worshipping in the mosque when the attack took place. First hand investigation by Judge Goldstone's team revealed evidence of significant shrapnel damage within the mosque. The report also says that the mosque had unexpectedly combined its sunset and evening prayers on the day of the incident, and it is possible that this detail was not known to the IDF at the moment of the strike, added Halevi.

According to a 2010 report by the Israel Ministry of Foreign Affairs, following investigations carried out by Israel into allegations of misconduct and violations of the Law of Armed Conflict by the Israel Defense Forces, "an IDF officer was severely reprimanded and two other officers were sanctioned for failing to exercise appropriate judgment during an incident that resulted in civilian casualties in the Al-Maqadmah mosque".
