= List of libraries in Palestine =

This is a list of libraries in Palestine.

== Libraries in the West Bank ==
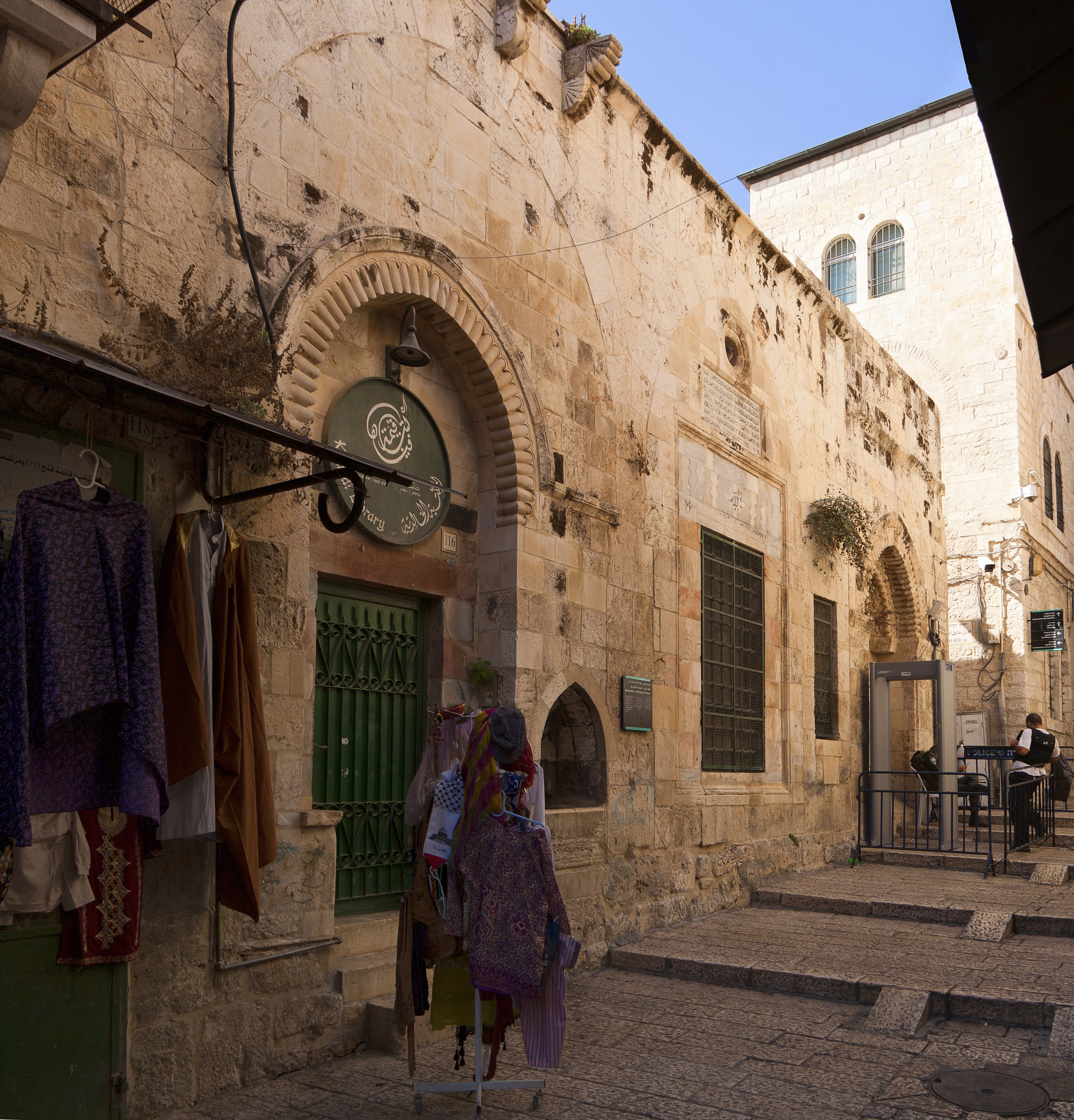
Khalidi Library

In 2011 there were 52 public libraries in the West Bank.

- Al-Budeiri Library
- Al-Quds University Library
- An-Najah University Library
- Arab American University Library - Jenin
- Arab Thought Forum Library
- Beth University Library
- Bethlehem Public Library
- Hebron University Library
- Islamic University Library - Gaza
- Issaf Nashashibi Center for Culture and Literature
- Khalidi Library
- Nablus Library
- Palestine Polytechnic University Library
- Palestinian Legislative Council Library
- Palestinian National Library

== Libraries in the Gaza Strip ==
During the 2008–2009 Gaza War, several public libraries and university libraries were damaged or destroyed. As of 2010, there were thirteen public libraries in the Gaza Strip. A further seven libraries were destroyed as a result of the 2014 Gaza War.

- Deir al-Balah Municipality Public Library
- Edward Said Library
- Gaza Municipality Public Library
- Khan Yunis Municipality Public Library
- Rafah Municipality Public Library
- Samir Mansour Library
- Phoenix Library, established in April of 2026 with many of the books being retrieved from under the rubble.

== See also ==
- List of museums in Palestine
