= Beit Lahia =

City in the Gaza Strip, Palestine

Beit Lahia بيت لاهيا
- City

Arabic transcription(s)
  - Arabic: بيت لاهيا
  - Latin: Bayt Lahiya (official)
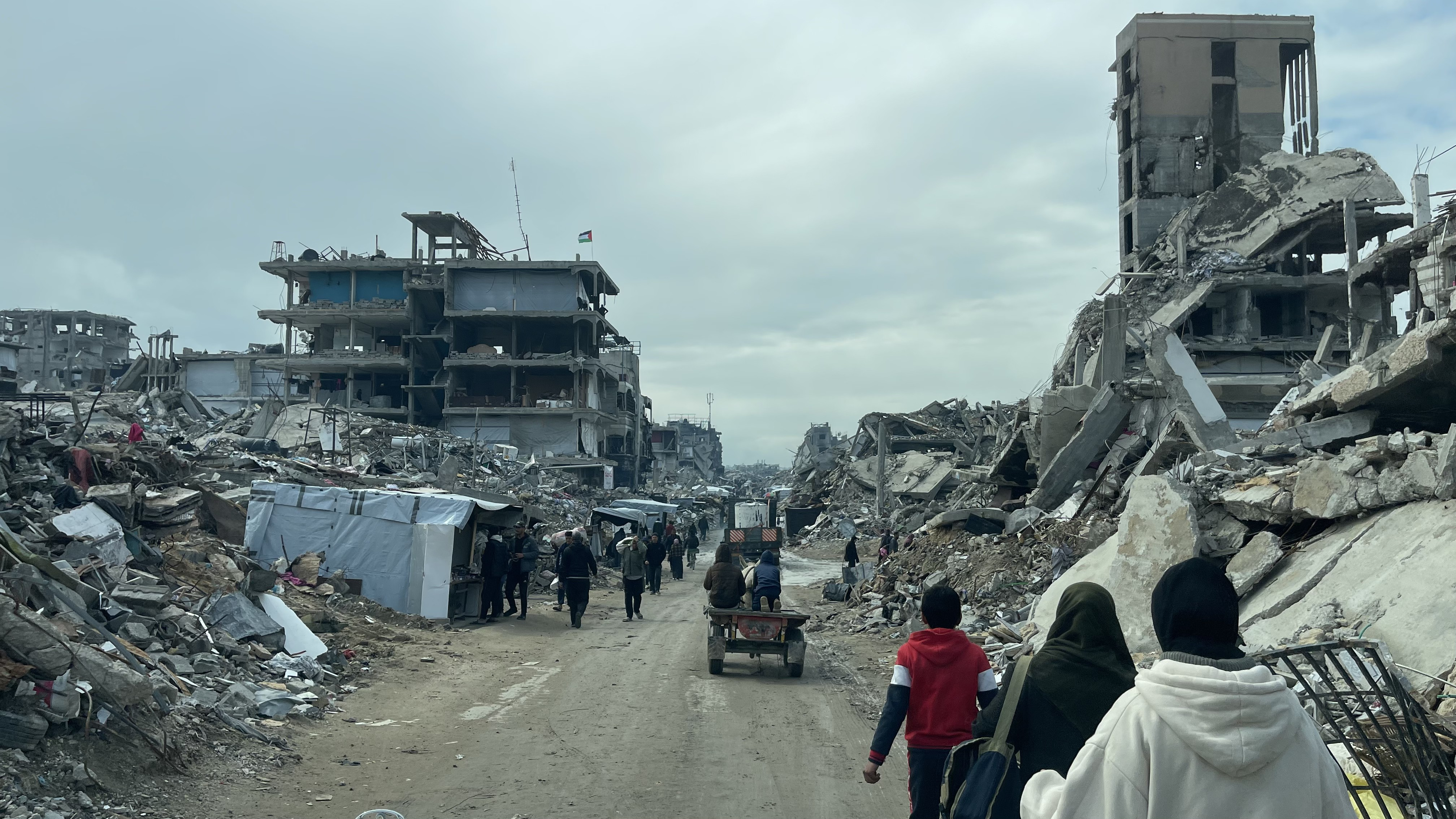
- Palestinians in the ruins of Beit Lahia, destroyed by Israeli bombing of the Gaza Strip, February 2025

- Municipal Seal of Beit Lahia
- Interactive map of Beit Lahia
- Location of Beit Lahia within Palestine
- Coordinates: 31°33′N 34°30′E
- Palestine grid: 102/106
- State: State of Palestine
- Governorate: North Gaza

Government
  - Type: City
  - Control: Israel
  - Head of Municipality: Izz al-Din al-Dahnoun

Population (2017)
  - Total: 89,838
- Name meaning: "House of Lahi"
- Website: www.bietlahia.mun.ps

Beit Lahia or Beit Lahiya (Arabic: بيت لاهيا) is a city in the Gaza Strip, north of Jabalia, in the North Gaza Governorate of the State of Palestine. It sits next to Beit Hanoun and close to the border with Israel. According to the Palestinian Central Bureau of Statistics, the city had a population of 89,838 in 2017.

== Geography ==
Beit Lahia is surrounded by dunes, some of which rise to 55 m (180 ft) above sea level. The area is renowned for its many large sycamore fig trees. The city is known for its fresh, sweet water, berries and citrus trees. According to Edward Henry Palmer, "Lahia" was from "Lahi", a personal name.

== History ==
=== Roman period ===
Beit Lahia has an ancient hill and nearby lay abandoned village ruins. The town has been identified as the Bethelia and had originally a pagan temple.

According to the 5th-century historian Sozomen, whose family had lived in the town for several generations, the townspeople started converting to Christianity due to the hermit Hilarion who is attributed to have healed miraculously a citizen called Alaphion. An eremitic center was founded around the year 360 in the village, housing around four anchorites who were disciples of Hilarion. Ceramics from the Byzantine period have been found.

=== Early Islamic period ===
A mihrab, or mosque alcove indicating the direction of salah (Muslim daily prayers), is all that remains of an ancient mosque to the west of Beit Lahia dating to the end of the Fatimid Caliphate and beginning of the Ayyubid dynasty of Saladin, and two other mosques dating to the Gaza Sanjak of the Ottoman era. Yaqut al-Hamawi (d. 1229) described "Bait Lihya" as being located "near Ghazzah", and he further noted that "it is a village with many fruit-trees".

=== Mamluk period ===
A marble slab, deposited in the maqam of Salim Abu Musallam in Beit Lahia is inscribed in late Mamluk naskhi letters. It is an epitaph over four sons of the Governor of Gaza, Aqbay al-Ashrafi, who all died in the month of Rajab 897 AH (29 April–9 May 1492 CE). It is assumed that the children died of the plague, described by Mujir al-Din, which ravaged Palestine in 1491–1492.

=== Ottoman Empire ===
In 1517, the village was incorporated into the Damascus Eyalet of the Ottoman Empire with the rest of Palestine, and in 1596, Beit Lahia appeared in Ottoman tax registers as being in the nahiyah (subdistrict) of the Gaza Sanjak. It had a population of 70 Muslim households and paid a fixed tax rate of 25% on various agricultural products, including wheat, barley, summer crops, vineyards, fruit trees, goats and/or beehives.

During the 17th and 18th centuries, the area of Beit Lahia experienced a significant process of settlement decline due to Bedouin pressures on local communities. The residents of abandoned villages moved to surviving settlements, but the land continued to be cultivated by neighboring villages.

In 1838, Edward Robinson noted Beit Lehia as a Muslim village located in the Gaza district.

In May 1863, Victor Guérin visited the village. He described it:

[P]eopled by 250 inhabitants, it occupies an oblong valley, well cultivated, and surrounded by high sand-dunes, which cause a great heat. It is a little oasis, incessantly menaced by moving sand-hills, which surround it on every side, and would engulf it were it not for the continued struggle of man to arrest their progress.

An Ottoman village list from about 1870 showed that Beit Lahia had a population of 394, with a total of 118 houses, though the population count included men only.

In 1883 the Palestine Exploration Fund's Survey of Western Palestine described it as a "small village with fine gardens and groves of large and ancient olives in the middle of the sand. It has a well to the south [..] There is a small mosque in the village."

=== Mandatory Palestine ===
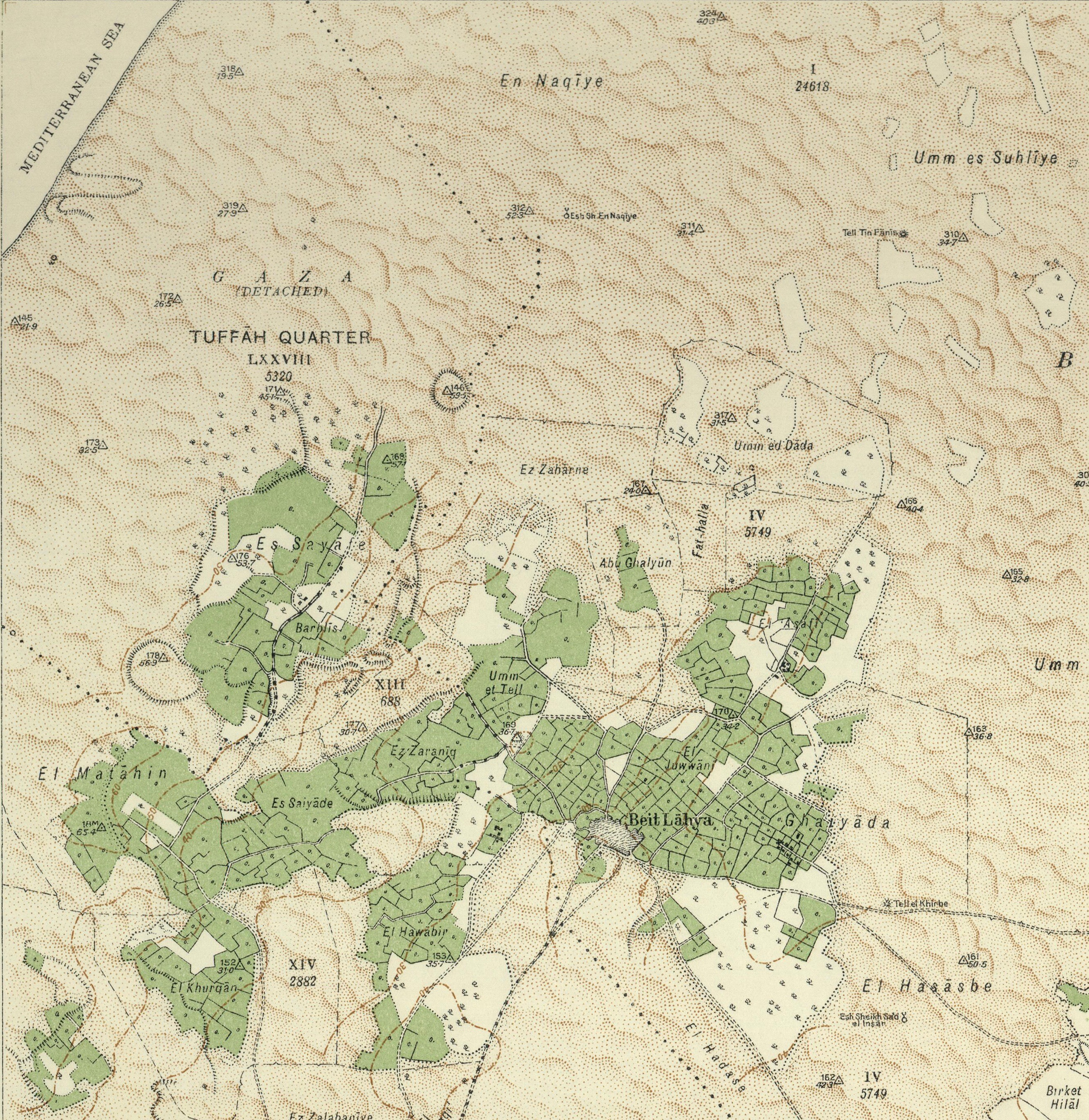
Beit Lahia 1931 1:20,000

In the 1922 census of Palestine conducted by the British Mandate authorities, Bait Lahia had a population of 871 inhabitants, all Muslims, increasing by the 1931 census to 1,133, still all Muslim, in 223 houses.

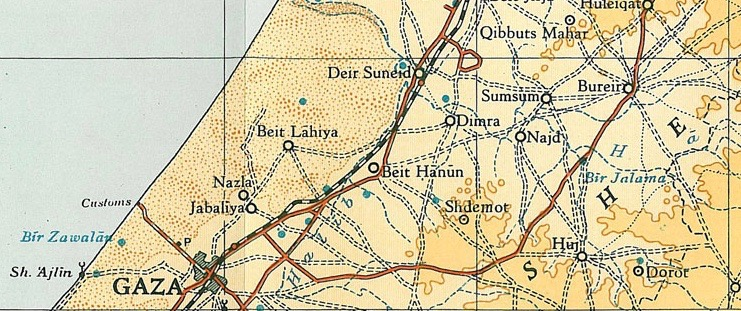
Beit Lahia 1945 1:250,000

In the 1945 statistics the population of Beit Lahiya consisted of 1,700 Muslims and the land area was 38,376 dunams, according to an official land and population survey. Of this, 134 dunams were designated for citrus and bananas, 1,765 for plantations and irrigable land, 15,185 for cereals, while 18 dunams were built-up areas.

=== 2004–2023 ===
On 4 January 2005, seven civilian residents of Beit Lahia, including six members of the same family, were killed, with the incident blamed on shelling by Israel Defense Forces (IDF) of the agricultural area where they were working.

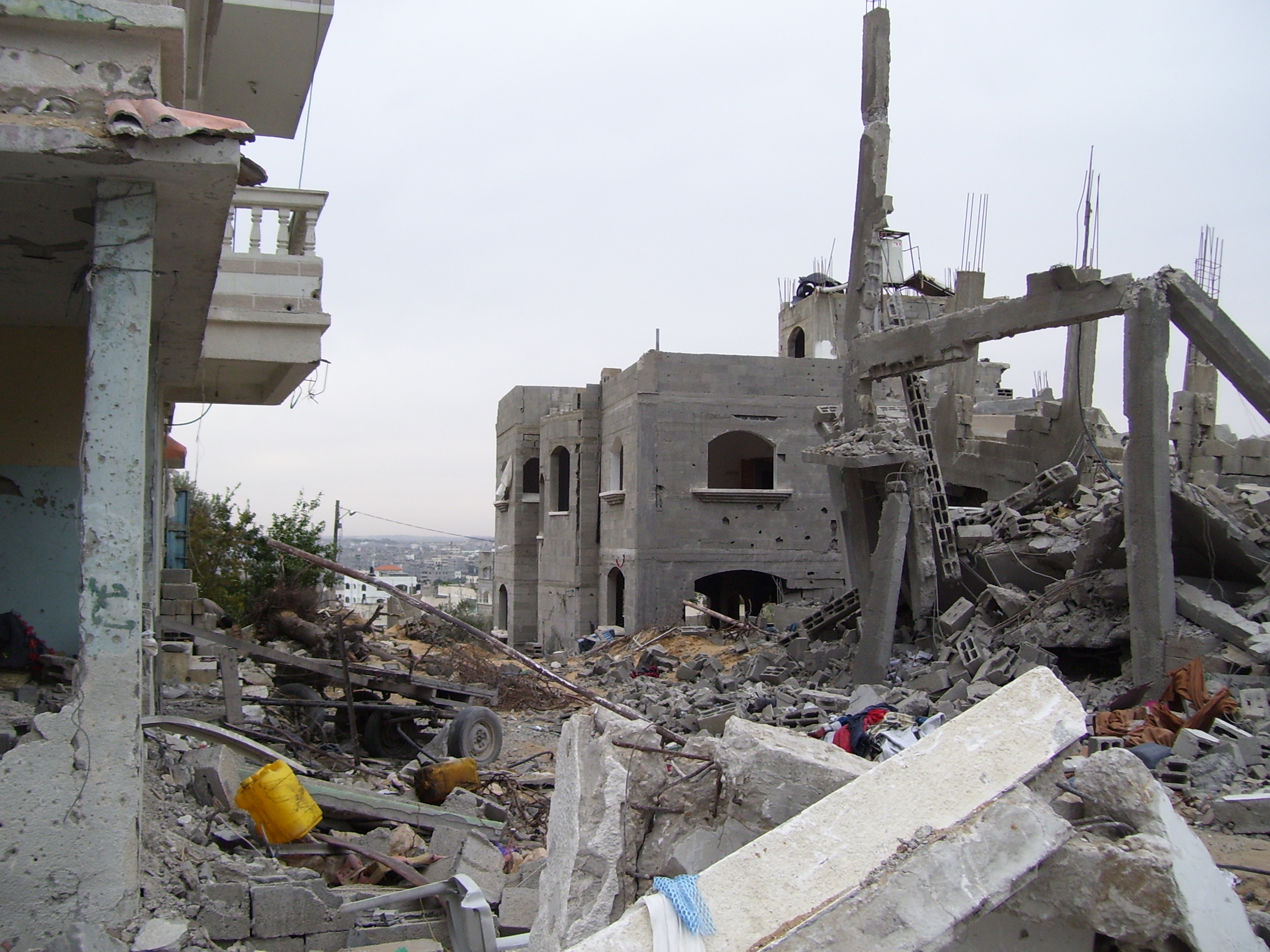
View of Beit Lahia in 2006 after an Israeli airstrike

On 9 June 2006, eight civilians were killed by IDF shells while picnicking on the northern Gaza beach in Beit Lahia. The dead included seven members of the Ali Ghaliya family. The IDF disputed they were responsible.

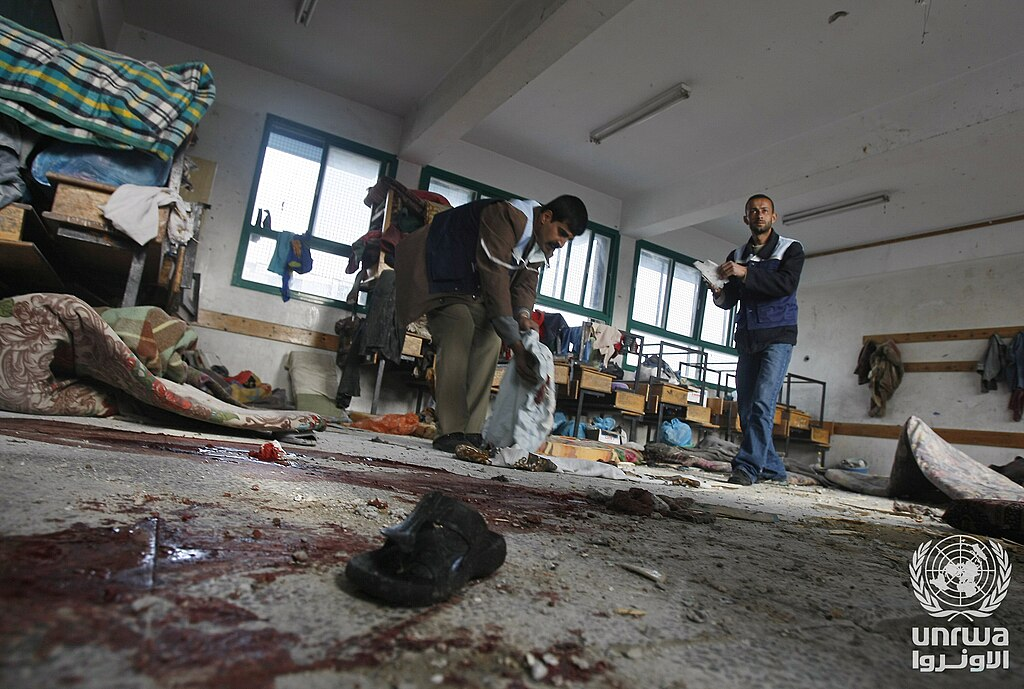
Israeli bombing of a school in Beit Lahia, January 17, 2009.

The town was a frequent target of airstrikes by Israel during the Gaza War (2008–2009) and has been a battlefield between Israel and Hamas.

The Ibrahim al-Maqadma Mosque missile strike occurred on 3 January 2009 as part of the Gaza War when an Israeli missile hit the Ibrahim al-Maqadna Mosque during evening prayer. Witnesses said over 200 Palestinians were praying inside at the time. At least 14 people, including six children, were killed, and many more than 60 wounded.

In 2017, the Edward Said Public Library was established in Beit Lahia by the poet Mosab Abu Toha; it was the first public library in the Gaza Strip for English-language works.

=== Gaza war (2023–present) ===
In December 2023, the Israel Defence Forces began their offensive in Beit Lahia. Israel launched airstrikes on targets Hamas militants. Though they launched several assaults on the city, Israel did not fully occupy Beit Lahia. Rather, they had encircled the town and occupied the surrounding villages and farmland.

In January 2024, Israel withdrew from the majority of North Gaza, and a ground connection between Palestinian-controlled Gaza City was re-established. Around this time, the Gaza Soup Kitchen was established in Beit Lahia to provide food to Palestinians at risk of famine.

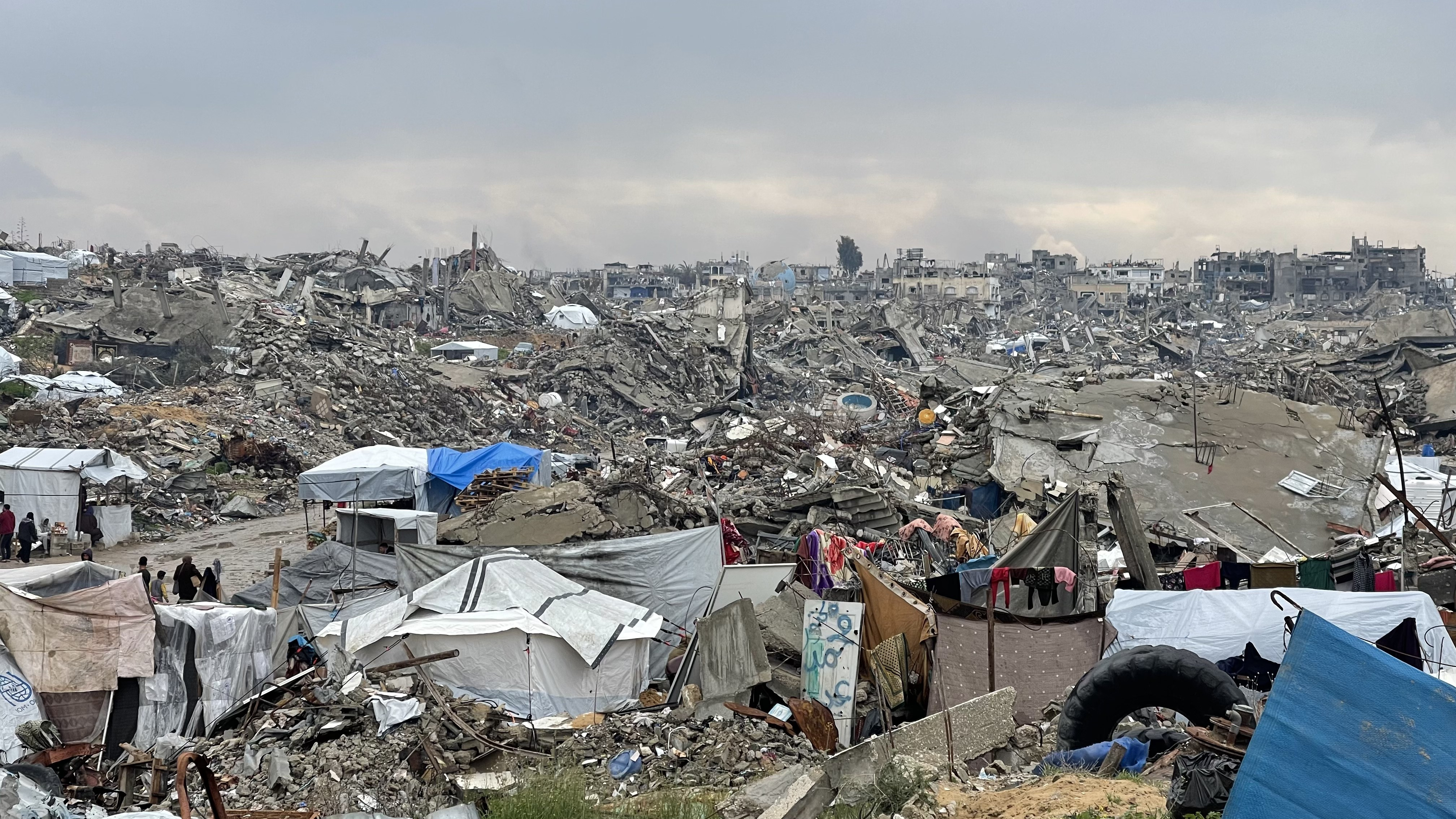
Damage caused by the Israeli army in Beit Lahia, February 23, 2025

In April 2024, Israel withdrew all territories in the Gaza Strip except for the Netzarim Corridor, returning the northern villages such as As-Siafa back to Palestinian control until the second Israeli invasion of northern Gaza in May 2024 as a result of Hamas regrouping in some areas there.

By June 2024, Gaza's Civil Defence stated the destruction in Beit Lahia "defies imagination".

On 29 October 2024, nearly 100 civilians, including over 20 children, were killed in a bombing of a five-story building by Israeli Forces. The Gaza Health Ministry reported over 90 casualties, including 25 children, with numerous individuals trapped under the rubble.

On 26 March 2025, The Guardian reported that hundreds of Palestinians, mostly male, had gathered in Beit Lahia, chanting anti-Hamas slogans.

== Demography ==
Some of Beit Lahia's residents trace their origins to Egypt, while others are Bedouins who migrated from the Mount Hebron area.

== International relations ==
Beit Lahia is twin or sister cities with:

- Padang, Indonesia
- Talas, Turkey

== Bibliography ==
- Barron, J.B., ed. (1923). Palestine: Report and General Abstracts of the Census of 1922. Government of Palestine.
- Conder, C.R.; Kitchener, H.H. (1883). The Survey of Western Palestine: Memoirs of the Topography, Orography, Hydrography, and Archaeology. Vol. 3. London: Committee of the Palestine Exploration Fund.
- Dauphin, C. (1998). La Palestine byzantine, Peuplement et Populations. BAR International Series 726 (in French). Vol. III : Catalogue. Oxford: Archeopress. ISBN 0-860549-05-4.
- Department of Statistics (1945). Village Statistics, April, 1945. Government of Palestine.
- Guérin, V. (1869). Description Géographique Historique et Archéologique de la Palestine (in French). Vol. 1: Judee, pt. 2. Paris: L'Imprimerie Nationale.
- Hadawi, S. (1970). Village Statistics of 1945: A Classification of Land and Area ownership in Palestine. Palestine Liberation Organization Research Centre. Archived from the original on 8 December 2018.
- Hartmann, M. (1883). "Die Ortschaftenliste des Liwa Jerusalem in dem türkischen Staatskalender für Syrien auf das Jahr 1288 der Flucht (1871)". Zeitschrift des Deutschen Palästina-Vereins. 6: 102–149.
- Hütteroth, W.-D.; Abdulfattah, K. (1977). Historical Geography of Palestine, Transjordan and Southern Syria in the Late 16th Century. Erlanger Geographische Arbeiten, Sonderband 5. Erlangen, Germany: Vorstand der Fränkischen Geographischen Gesellschaft. ISBN 3-920405-41-2.
- Le Strange, G. (1890). Palestine Under the Moslems: A Description of Syria and the Holy Land from A.D. 650 to 1500. Committee of the Palestine Exploration Fund.
- Mills, E., ed. (1932). Census of Palestine 1931. Population of Villages, Towns and Administrative Areas. Jerusalem: Government of Palestine.
- Palmer, E.H. (1881). The Survey of Western Palestine: Arabic and English Name Lists Collected During the Survey by Lieutenants Conder and Kitchener, R. E. Transliterated and Explained by E.H. Palmer. Committee of the Palestine Exploration Fund.
- Robinson, E.; Smith, E. (1841). Biblical Researches in Palestine, Mount Sinai and Arabia Petraea: A Journal of Travels in the year 1838. Vol. 3. Boston: Crocker & Brewster.
- Sharon, M. (1999). Corpus Inscriptionum Arabicarum Palaestinae, B-C. Vol. II. BRILL. ISBN 9004110836.
- Socin, A. (1879). "Alphabetisches Verzeichniss von Ortschaften des Paschalik Jerusalem". Zeitschrift des Deutschen Palästina-Vereins. 2: 135–163.
