= Nablus Library =

Public library in Nablus, West Bank, Palestine

Nablus Municipality Public Library
- مكتبة بلدية نابلس
- 32.22199370472764°N 35.25706469923608°E
- Location: Nablus, Palestine
- Type: Public library
- Established: 1960; 66 years ago

Collection
- Size: 8,000 book

Other information
- Website: www.nablus.org/index.php/ar/

Nablus Library (Arabic: مكتبة بلدية نابلس) is the oldest and largest public library in the West Bank, Palestine. The library was established by the municipality of Nablus with aid from the Jordanian government in 1960. It was the first library in Palestine to use Dewey Decimal Classification.

The building itself is an Ottoman-era structure built in 1817 as a place for senior military officers to rest. It was also formerly a café, a movie theatre, and a shelter after the 1927 Jericho earthquake. Surrounding the library building is a garden, used as a community space for lectures and events. During the First Intifada, while most schools and universities in the West Bank were shuttered, Nablus Library remained open. In the late 1990s, the library opened a children's department for the first time. As of late 2013, the library was constructing an audiovisual room.

Nablus Library's circulating collection includes some 80,000 books, most of which are in Arabic. Besides the circulating collection, Nablus Library also houses several significant archival collections, including the "Prisoner's Section", an archive of 8,000 books and 870 notebooks made and used by Palestinian prisoners held in Israeli jails between 1975 and 1995. It also holds the personal collections of scholars like Rasim Sweilem and Mohammed Ezzat Zuayter, as well as Qadri Tuqan a Nablusi educator and one of the founders of An-Najah College, now An-Najah National University. Other collections include Palestinian newspapers dating back to the 1920s, as well as a collection of sharia court documents from northern Palestine spanning the length of the Mandate Period. Nablus Library also houses doctoral theses donated by students from An-Najah National University.

In 2000, Nablus Library claimed to have about 500 visitors per day and 300 books lent out per day. According to the International Federation of Library Associations and Institutions, in 2000 the library had 27 employees, 4 of which were educated in library science. As of 2014 the library had 46 employees.

== Prisoner's section ==
The collection includes 8,000 volumes of published books and 870 notebooks made and used by Palestinian prisoners held in Israeli jails between 1975 and 1995. A large segment of the material is from the Nablus Jail, the veritable fount of the Palestinian prisoner self-education movement. Most Israeli jails in the 1960s did not have prison libraries; often books were prohibited. Nablus Jail was unique in that it included a small library for detainees, carried over from its time under Jordanian administration. A 1972 visit by the Red Cross concluded with the vast expansion of the library to include poetry, religious texts, books on Zionism, Marxism, Leninism, and economic theory, among others. Using this expanded library, detainees created a thriving intellectual culture within Nablus Jail; this self-education movement spread to other Israeli-operated detention facilities as well. Detainees at Nablus Jail often hand-copied books to send to other jails which lacked libraries.

In the wake of the Oslo Accords, several Israeli-operated detention facilities, including Nablus Jail, were closed. The contents of the prison libraries were donated to Nablus Library in 1996.

== See also ==
- List of libraries in Palestine
