= Edward Said Public Library =

Library in Gaza Strip, Palestine

- Location: Palestine
- Established: 2017
- Branches: 3

Other information
- Director: Mosab Abu Toha
- Website: espl.ps?lang=en

The Edward Said Public Library is a public library in Palestine. It was established in 2017 and is the first English-language public library in the Gaza Strip. The first branch was opened in Beit Lahia, and since two other branches have been established, one in each of Gaza City and Jerusalem. The library was established by the writer Mosab Abu Toha who began collecting books for the library in 2016 and raised funds to rent a venue to house the library. It was named after Edward Said and included some books from Said's private collection. The branch in Beit Lahia was destroyed and one of its librarians, Doaa Al-Masri, was killed during the Gaza war.

== See also ==
- Destruction of cultural heritage during the Gaza war
- List of libraries in Palestine
