= As-Siafa =

- Coordinates: 31°35′11″N 34°29′34″E
- Country: Palestine
- Governorates of Palestine: North Gaza Governorate

Population (2005)
  - Total: 190

As-Siafa, also known as Siafa, is a village in the North Gaza Governorate of the Gaza Strip. It is also the location of a border crossing between Israel and the Gaza Strip. It is located to the northwest of Beit Lahia and to the south of Zikim. The village is strategically located as it is the northernmost settlement of the Gaza Strip and has been the theater of multiple events during the Gaza war. The population of As-Siafa was 190 as of 2005 according to the United Nations.

== History ==
=== 2005-2009 ===
190 Palestinians lived in As-Siafa within the northern Israeli settlement block in February 2005. 389 Israelis lived in Elei Sinai, an Israeli settlement that overlapped with what is today's As-Siafa. The last of the settlers were evacuated on 21 August 2005 as part of the Israeli disengagement from the Gaza Strip.

=== Gaza War ===
On 26 October 2023, the Israel Defense Forces entered the village with military vehicles. On 10 April 2024, the Israeli defense minister Yoav Gallant announced a plan to open a new land crossing by As-Siafa to allow aid to flow from overseas, notably from Jordan. On 12 May 2024, the crossing, then dubbed the western Erez crossing, was officially opened. The crossing was closed on 2 August 2024. In November 2024, the crossing was considered "Open for pre-approved goods and/or people". By then, it was dubbed the As-Siafa/Zikim crossing.

== See also ==
- Gaza Strip
- North Gaza Governorate
