= Mosab Abu Toha =

Palestinian poet and educator (born 1992)

- مصعب أبو توهة
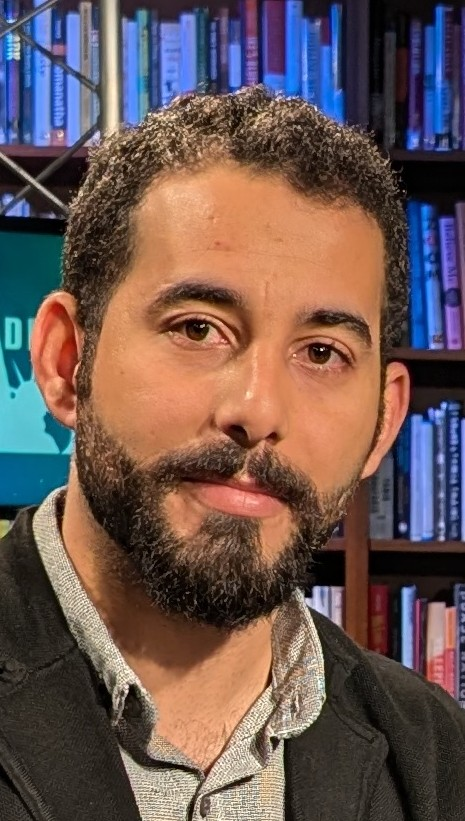
- Abu Toha in 2024
- Born: 17 November 1992 (age 33); Al-Shati refugee camp, Gaza Strip, Palestine
- Education: Islamic University of Gaza; Syracuse University (MFA)
- Occupations: Poet; librarian

Mosab Abu Toha (Arabic: مصعب أبو توهة, romanized: Muṣʿab Abū Tūha; born 17 November 1992) is a Palestinian writer, poet, scholar, and librarian from the Gaza Strip. His debut book of poetry, Things You May Find Hidden in My Ear (2022) won the Palestine Book Award and an American Book Award. It was also a finalist for the National Book Critics Circle Award and the Walcott Prize for Poetry.

Abu Toha is the founder of the Edward Said Library, Gaza's first English-language library. He was detained by the Israeli army in November 2023 when he was trying to flee to Egypt with his family. He was later released after being questioned and has since worked as a chronicler of the war from afar. He won the Pulitzer Prize for Commentary in 2025 for his essays about the Gaza war in The New Yorker.

== Early life ==
Abu Toha was born in 1992 in the Al-Shati refugee camp, shortly before the signing of the Oslo Accords. He graduated in English from the Islamic University of Gaza. In 2017, he founded the Edward Said Library, an English-language public library in Beit Lahia, of which a second branch was opened in Gaza City in 2019.

In 2023, Abu Toha graduated from Syracuse University’s College of Arts and Sciences with a Master of Fine Arts in creative writing.

== Career ==
Abu Toha taught English at United Nations Relief and Works Agency (UNRWA) schools in Gaza from 2016 until 2019, and is the founder of the Edward Said Library, the only English-language library in Gaza. In 2019–20 he was a visitor at Harvard University, as a Scholar-at-Risk Fellow at the Department of Comparative Literature, a librarian at the Houghton Library, and a fellow in the Harvard Divinity School.

Abu Toha is a columnist for Arrowsmith Press, and has written from Gaza for The Nation, Literary Hub, the New York Times, and The New Yorker.

His poems have been published on the Poetry Foundation website, and in publications which include The Atlantic, Banipal, Los Angeles Review of Books, The Markaz Review, The New Arab, The New York Review, The New Yorker, The Paris Review, Peripheries, Ploughshares, Poetry Magazine, The Progressive, and Solstice.

In 2022, he published his first book of poetry, Things You May Find Hidden in My Ear (City Lights). It won the Palestine Book Award and an American Book Award. It was also a finalist for the National Book Critics Circle Award and the Derek Walcott Prize for Poetry. The New York Times said, "Abu Toha’s accomplished debut contrasts scenes of political violence with natural beauty." For the National Book Critics Circle, Jacob Appel wrote, "What makes Abu Toha’s work resonate so strongly is his gift for the particular. By avoiding panoramic generalizations, he hones in upon evocative images that capture the larger plight of his people."

In 2023, Abu Toha was appointed to a visiting faculty position at Syracuse University through the Scholars at Risk network.

== Gaza war (2023–present) ==
In October 2023, Abu Toha, his wife and his children evacuated their home in Beit Lahiya, Gaza, and moved to the Jabaliya refugee camp after Israel warned it would bomb Beit Lahiya. In a New Yorker article published 6 November, Toha wrote that he had ridden his bicycle to Beit Lahiya in an attempt to retrieve some books from the collection in his home. However, their home and the surrounding area were destroyed. Israel later also bombed Jabaliya, seventy meters from where they were.

Mosab Abu Toha was good friends with the poet Refaat Alareer who was killed by an Israeli airstrike on 7 December 2023. On 22 January 2024, Amy Goodman asked Toha to speak about Alareer's significance and how he died. He responded by saying first that his death was not unique and that at this time and that Alareer's body is still under the rubble. He also shared: "I'd like to remember Refaat as someone who was always ready to listen to our literary works. He liked to read some of Shakespeare's sonnets, of John Donne's poems. He was a huge fan of John Donne. I would like to remember Refaat as someone who loves – who loved to go to strawberry farms and pick strawberries with me and play pun games. Refaat is someone who didn't want to die."

=== Detention by Israeli forces while evacuating ===
On 19 November 2023, Abu Toha was detained by Israel Defense Forces while he was heading to the Rafah border crossing in an attempt to evacuate from the Gaza Strip with his family. Initial reports attributed it to his recent high-profile writings. He had been told by American officials that he and his family would be able to cross into Egypt, since his three-year-old son is a US citizen. The Israeli military detained him at a checkpoint as he attempted to leave the north of Gaza for the south. The family had been given clearance to evacuate.

According to the Palestinian-Canadian lawyer Diana Buttu, Abu Toha had been sent for by the US embassy. Conveying an account from Abu Toha's wife, Buttu told Time: “He was forced to put his son down … They were all forced to walk with their hands raised in the air. He raised his arms in the air … [and he and] around 200 others were taken out of this line and abducted. They have not heard from him since.” The Israeli Defense Forces told the Washington Post that they were looking into the arrest.

New Yorker online editor Michael Luo confirmed on 20 November that Abu Toha had been "arrested". Free speech organization PEN America called for his protection, and PEN International called for information about Abu Toha's situation.

On 21 November 2023, Democracy Now! reported that Abu Toha had been released after being taken to an Israeli prison in the Negev and beaten, according to a statement from Buttu. He was taken to a hospital due to his injuries.

In a 2024 article in The New Yorker, Abu Toha described his move to Syracuse, New York, and the lingering impacts of his arrest, including secondary screenings in airports and a visit from FBI agents.

=== Targeting by Betar US ===
Far-right pro-Israel group Betar US sent Toha's name to the second Trump administration, recommending his arrest and deportation. After Abu Toha won the 2025 Pulitzer Prize, Betar again called for his deportation and described him as a "jihadi".

=== 2025 Pulitzer Prize ===
In 2025, Abu Toha's essays on the Gaza war in The New Yorker won the Pulitzer Prize for Commentary. The prize cited his essays "on the physical and emotional carnage in Gaza that combine deep reporting with the intimacy of memoir to convey the Palestinian experience" of the war. The four essays cited in the award covered the Gaza landscape, the Jabalia refugee camp, difficulties finding food in Gaza and the scrutiny experienced by Abu Toha while travelling in the US.

On winning the prize, Abu Toha said, "It is my biggest hope that this achievement and recognition will be a step toward greater understanding of the decades-long plight of the Palestinian people and that it will inspire people, especially those in power, to act and put an end to this tragedy."

=== Family deaths ===
On 1 August 2025, Abu Toha reported that his father-in-law was wounded by Israeli shrapnel in his brain near the Zikim crossing. His father-in-law died from his injuries on 3 August.

== Social media ==
On 25 January 2025, Abu Toha wrote a social media post questioning whether most of the hostages abducted by Palestinian militants during the October 7 attacks could be referred to as "hostages," specifically naming UK-Israeli civilian Emily Damari. On 6 May 2025, a day after winning the Pulitzer prize, he changed his post to read "some" instead of "most". On 3 February 2025, Abu Toha posted a message questioning whether abducted surveillance soldier Agam Berger could be considered a hostage, calling her and others "killers who join the army and have family in the army!" On 1 February 2025, he posted on social media casting doubt on reports by Israeli hostages that they were tortured in captivity.

The Times of Israel editorial staff wrote that they "uncovered posts in which [Abu Toha] accused Israel of killing hostages held by terror groups in Gaza, disparaged calls for their release, urged the international community to take military action against Israel, and called for activists and others to 'escalate' actions against the Jewish state." Abu Toha had also criticized the BBC for publishing an article which cited the IDF spokesman Daniel Hagari's statement that forensic evidence showed that the Bibas children were killed with "bare hands" without the BBC seeing the forensic evidence themselves.

Writer Seth Mandel and journalist Gil Hoffman criticized the conferment of the Pulitzer Prize to Abu Toha. Former hostage Emily Damari, whose hostage status was questioned by Abu Toha, called him "the modern-day equivalent of a Holocaust denier" for "blatant denial of documented crimes" in a letter to the Pulitzer prize board. Journalist Eliana Johnson, who was on the nominating jury panel for the Pulitzer prize for national reporting in 2025, criticized the Pulitzer board for granting the prize to Abu Toha, questioning if he had been properly vetted.

After Abu Toha won the 2025 Pulitzer Prize, he was interviewed by MSNBC. When asked about Emily Damari, he said he had not questioned her status as a hostage but was indicating "that the language used to describe those incarcerated differs depending on whether they are Israeli or Palestinian". Abu Toha said, "I have people in my family who were kidnapped from checkpoints, from schools, from shelters, and they are named prisoners." He also told MSNBC that an Israeli airstrike killed 31 of his family members.

Soon after Abu Toha's win, Meta suspended his account for the second time in a week. The decision was criticized by journalist Meghnad Bose, who wrote on Twitter that it was "the latest high-profile instance of Meta's disproportionate censorship of content related to Palestine." Meta said the suspension was an error and restored Abu Toha's account the next day, on 7 May.

== Awards ==
- Pulitzer Prize for Commentary, 2025
- Freedom of Expression Award by The Norwegian Authors' Union (with Adania Shibli), 2025
- Overseas Press Club Award for The New Yorker series
- James Beard Award for "My Family’s Daily Struggle to Find Food in Gaza” in The New Yorker, 2025

== Works ==
- Things You May Find Hidden in My Ear: Poems from Gaza. City Lights Publishers. 2022. ISBN 9780872868601. OCLC 1267386450.
- Forest of Noise. Knopf. 2024. ISBN 9780593803974.
