= List of journalists killed in the Gaza war =

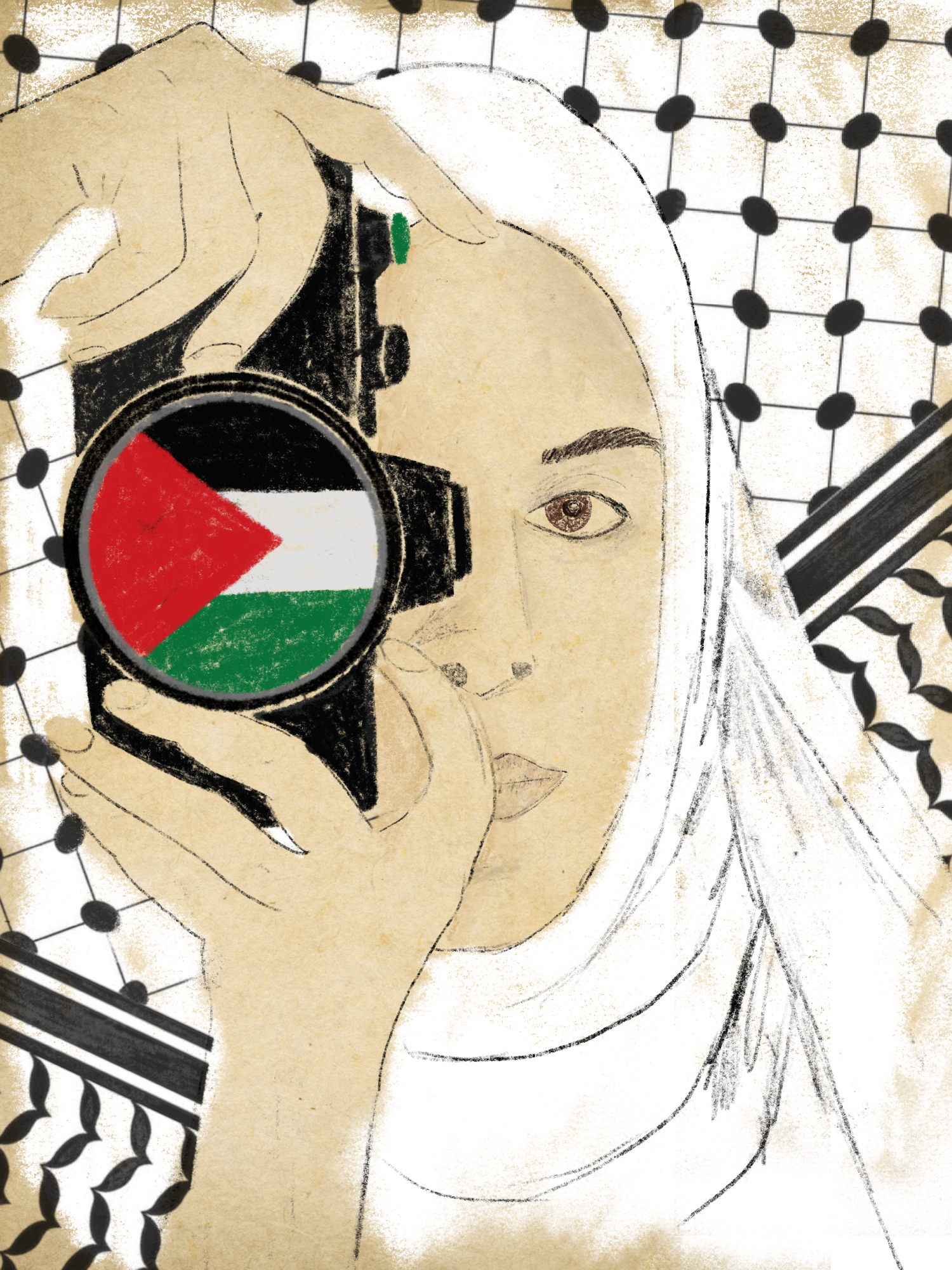
Portrait of photojournalist Fatima Hassouna, by Andrea Ebert. On 16 April 2025, she and ten members of her family, including her pregnant sister, were killed by an Israeli missile. Fatima Hassouna was the protagonist of the documentary Put Your Soul on Your Hand and Walk.

The killing of journalists in the Gaza war, overwhelmingly Palestinians killed by Israel, along with other acts of violence against journalists, marks the deadliest period for journalists in the Israeli–Palestinian conflict since 1992 and the single deadliest conflict for journalists in all known conflicts in the history of the world, according to the Costs of War Project. According to the United Nations, the number of Palestinian journalists killed by Israel since the start of the war stood at 242 by 11 August 2025. On the other hand, the Committee to Protect Journalists (CPJ) reported that 192 journalists, at least 184 of them Palestinian, had been killed by Israel as of 10 August 2025 while the International Federation of Journalists (IFJ) reported the killing of at least 180 Palestinian journalists and media workers by Israel as of 11 August 2025. In June 2026, CPJ announced that it had removed 20 names from the list, eight because of established links to Hamas, and 12 for other reasons, updating its list to 209. A July 2024 count by the Gaza Government Media Office placed the number of Palestinian journalists killed by Israel at 160. By January 2025, Israel had reportedly killed 42 more Palestinian journalists to raise this number to 202, and by July 2025, it had reportedly killed 15 more journalists to raise the number to 217. An aggregation of data from multiple sources, including the CPJ and the IFJ, which listed the names of all journalists hitherto reported to have been killed by Israel, concluded that, by 11 August 2025, Israel had killed up to 274 journalists, with 269 of them Palestinian.

The head of the Committee to Protect Journalists stated in 2024, "Israel's war on Gaza is more deadly to journalists than any previous war". Israeli airstrikes additionally damaged or destroyed an estimated 48 media facilities in Gaza. Reporters Without Borders (RSF) has reported that the Israeli army intentionally targeted Palestinian journalists. RSF's media abuse barometer lists 67 names, excluding two removed for ties to Hamas. The Guardian stated that some in the IDF considered Hamas-affiliated Palestinian journalists to be legitimate targets despite their non-involvement in combat, contrary to the opinion of experts in international law. In 2023, nearly 75% of journalists killed worldwide were Palestinians who had died in Israel's war in Gaza. According to the Committee to Protect Journalists, Israel was the second-worst country in the world for allowing the murderers of journalists to go unpunished. On 30 September 2026, following the killing of journalist Mohammed Abdul Aziz al-Najjar, the Gaza government media office announced that the number of Palestinian journalists who were killed by the Israeli army in the Gaza Strip had reached 263. This figure covers the period since the start of the war.

UNESCO awarded its 2024 World Press Freedom Prize to the Palestinian journalists of Gaza.

According to a report by the Watson Institute for International and Public Affairs, the war in Gaza since 7 October 2023 has led to the deaths of more journalists than the combined total killed during the U.S. Civil War, World War I, World War II, the Korean War, the Vietnam War (including related conflicts in Cambodia and Laos), the Yugoslav Wars of the 1990s and early 2000s, and the post-9/11 war in Afghanistan.

== Palestine ==
Palestinian journalists killed in the Gaza war
Date	Name	Agency/Position	Location	Description
October 7, 2023	Mohammad Al-Salhi	Fourth Authority news agency (photojounalist)	Gaza–Israel border, east of Al-Bureij	Shot by Israeli forces.
October 7, 2023	Mohammad Jarghoun	Smart Media	Gaza–Israel border, east of Rafah	Shot by Israeli forces. According to the Committee to Protect Journalists, he engaged in combat.
October 7, 2023	Ibrahim Mohammad Lafi	Ain Media (Photographer)	Erez Crossing	Shot by Israeli forces
October 8, 2023	Assaad Shamlakh	Freelance journalist.	Sheikh Ijlin, Gaza City	Killed with his family in an Israeli airstrike on his home.
October 10, 2023	Hisham Alnwajha	Khabar news agency	Rimal, Gaza City	Israeli airstrike
October 10, 2023	Mohammed Sobh	Khabar news agency (photographer)	Rimal, Gaza City	Israeli airstrike
October 10, 2023	Saeed Al-Taweel	Al-Khamsa News (editor-in-chief)	Rimal, Gaza City	Israeli airstrike
October 11, 2023	Mohamed Fayez Abu Matar	Freelance photographer. Not a journalist or media worker according to the Committee to Protect Journalists.	Rafah	Killed in an airstrike while covering the conflict.
October 12, 2023	Ahmed Shehab	Radio Voice of the Prisoners	Jabalia	Killed along with his wife and three children in an Israeli airstrike on their residence
October 13, 2023	Husam Mubarak	Al-Aqsa Voice Radio	Northern Gaza	Israeli airstrike.
October 13, 2023	Salam Mema	Freelance journalist, head of the Women Journalists Committee at the Palestinian Media Assembly	Jabalia	Killed in an Israeli airstrike on her residence.
October 14, 2023	Yousef Maher Dawas	Contributor (Palestine Chronicle and We Are Not Numbers (WANN))	Beit Lahia	Killed along with several relatives in an Israeli airstrike on their residence.
October 16, 2023	Abdulhadi Habib	Al-Manara News Agency, HQ News Agency	Near Zeitoun	Killed along with several relatives in an Israeli airstrike on their residence.
October 17, 2023	Issam Bhar	Al-Aqsa TV	northern Gaza	Israeli airstrike.
October 17, 2023	Mohammad Balousha	Palestine Today (administrator)	Al-Saftawi, northern Gaza	Israeli airstrike.
October 18, 2023	Sameeh Al-Nady	Al-Aqsa TV (director)		Israeli airstrike.
October 19, 2023	Khalil Abu Athra	Al-Aqsa TV (videographer)	Rafah	Killed along with his brother in an Israeli airstrike
October 20, 2023	Mohammed Abu Ali	Al-Shabab Radio	Northern Gaza	Israeli airstrike
October 21, 2023	Hani Madhoun	Al-Aqsa TV (administrator)		Killed in an Israeli airstrike on his residence
October 22, 2023	Roshdi Sarraj	Ain Media (co-founder)	Tel al-Hawa	Israeli airstrike
October 23, 2023	Mohammed Imad Labad	Al Resalah	Sheikh Radwan, Gaza City	Israeli airstrike.
October 25, 2023	Salma Mukhaimer	Freelance journalist. Not a journalist or media worker according to the Committee to Protect Journalists.	Rafah	Killed alongside her child in an Israeli bombardment.
October 25, 2023	Ahmed Abu Mhadi	Al-Aqsa TV		Israeli airstrike
October 25, 2023	Saed al-Halabi	Al-Aqsa TV	Jabalia refugee camp	Israeli airstrike
October 25, 2023	Jamal Al-Faqaawi	Mithaq Media Foundation	Khan Yunis	Killed in an Israeli airstrike on his residence. Claimed by Palestinian Islamic Jihad as a member of its "Central Support and Supply Unit."
October 25, 2023	Zaher Al-Afghani	Mithaq Media Foundation	Deir al-Balah	Killed in an Israeli airstrike on his residence.
October 26, 2023	Duaa Sharaf	Al-Aqsa Voice Radio (host)	Yarmouk Camp	Killed along with her child in an airstrike on their residence
October 27, 2023	Yasser Abu Namous	Al-Sahel	Khan Yunis	Killed in an airstrike on his residence According to the Committee to Protect Journalists, he had engaged in combat.
October 30, 2023	Nazmi Al-Nadim	Palestine TV (deputy director of finance and administration)	Zeitoun	Killed along with relatives in an airstrike on his residence.
October 31, 2023	Majed Kashko	Palestine TV (office director)		Killed along with relatives in an Israeli airstrike.
October 31, 2023	Imad Al-Wahidi	Palestine TV (administrator)		Killed along with relatives in an Israeli airstrike
November 1, 2023	Iyad Matar	Al-Aqsa TV	Deir al-Balah Governorate	Killed along with his mother in an airstrike on his residence.
November 1, 2023	Majd Arandas	Al-Jamaheer	Nuseirat refugee camp	Airstrike
November 2, 2023	Muhammad Abu Hatab	Palestine TV	Khan Yunis	Killed along with eleven relatives in an airstrike on his residence
November 2, 2023	Mohamad Al-Bayyari	Al-Aqsa TV		Killed in an Israeli airstrike
November 3, 2023	Haitham Harara	Government media office in Gaza	Rimal, Gaza City	Killed by an airstrike on the gate of Al-Shifa Hospital
November 5, 2023	Mohamed Al Jaja	Press House-Palestine (organisational development consultant).	Nasser, Gaza City	Killed with his wife and two daughters in a strike on his home.
November 7, 2023	Mohamed Abu Hassira	Wafa		Killed along with 42 relatives in an airstrike on his residence.
November 7, 2023	Yahya Abu Manih	Al-Aqsa Voice Radio		According to the Committee to Protect Journalists, he engaged in combat.
November 10, 2023	Ahmed Al-Qara	Photojournalist according to the Palestinian Journalists Syndicate. Not a journalist or media worker according to the Committee to Protect Journalists.	Khuzaʽa, Khan Yunis	
November 13, 2023	Yaacoub Al-Barsh	Namaa Radio (executive director)	Northern Gaza	Killed in an Israeli airstrike on his residence. According to the Committee to Protect Journalists, he participated in combat.
November 13, 2023	Ahmed Fatima	Al-Qahera News photographer and Press House-Palestine media worker.	Gaza Strip	Killed in a strike.
November 18, 2023	Mossab Ashour	Photographer according to the International Federation of Journalists. Not a journalist or media worker according to the Committee to Protect Journalists.	Nuseirat refugee camp	
November 18, 2023	Amro Salah Abu Hayah	Al-Aqsa TV		Israeli airstrike
November 18, 2023	Mostafa El Sawaf	MSDR News (contributor)	Shawa Square, Gaza City	Killed along with his wife and two sons in an airstrike on their residence
November 18, 2023	Hassouneh Salim	Freelance photojournalist	Bureij refugee camp	Israeli airstrike
November 18, 2023	Sari Mansour	Quds News Network (director)	Bureij refugee camp	Israeli airstrike
November 18, 2023	Abdelhalim Awad	Al-Aqsa TV (driver)		Killed in an airstrike on his residence
November 19, 2023	Belal Jadallah	Press House-Palestine (director)		Killed in an Israeli strike on his car that also injured his brother-in-law
November 20, 2023	Alaa Taher Al-Hassanat	Al Majdat Media Network (presenter)		Reportedly killed along with relatives in an airstrike on her residence. However, conflicting reports stated that she had survived.
November 20, 2023	Ayat Khadoura	Freelance journalist and podcaster	Beit Lahia	Killed along with relatives in an Israeli airstrike on her residence.
November 21, 2023	Jamal Hanieh	Amwaj Sports Media Network	Gaza City	Israeli bombardment.
November 22, 2023	Mohamed Nabil Al-Zaq	Quds News Network (social media manager)		Israeli airstrike. According to the Committee to Protect Journalists, he engaged in combat.
November 22, 2023	Assem Al-Barsh	Al-Ray radio	Al-Saftawi	Shot by an Israeli sniper. According to the Committee to Protect Journalists, he had engaged in combat.
November 23, 2023	Mohamed Mouin Ayyash	freelance photographer	Nuseirat refugee camp	Killed along with 20 family members in an Israeli airstrike on his residence.
November 24, 2023	Mostafa Bakeer	Al-Aqsa TV (cameraman)	Rafah	Israeli airstrike. According to the Committee to Protect Journalists, he had engaged in combat.
November 24, 2023	Amal Zahed		Gaza City	Israeli airstrike.
November 25, 2023	Nader Al-Nazli	Palestine TV (technician)		Bombing of his residence.
December 1, 2023	Adham Hassouna	freelance journalist		Killed along with relatives in an Israeli airstrike.
December 1, 2023	Montaser Al-Sawaf	Anadolu Agency (cameraman)		Killed in an Israeli raid.
December 1, 2023	Marwan Al-Sawaf	Anadolu Agency (soundman and the brother of Montaser)		Killed in an Israeli raid.
December 1, 2023	Abdullah Darwish	Anadolu Agency (cameraman)		Killed in an Israeli raid. According to the Committee to Protect Journalists, he participated in combat.
December 3, 2023	Shima El-Gazzar	Al-Majedat	Rafah	Killed along with relatives in an Israeli airstrike.
December 3, 2023	Hassan Farajallah	Al-Quds TV		Israeli attack. According to the Committee to Protect Journalists, he had engaged in combat.
December 3, 2023	Hamada al-Yaziji	Kanaan News Agency (director), Al-Quds Radio	Sheikh Radwan	Israeli airstrike.
December 4, 2023	Abdul Hamid Qarnawi	Amwaj Sports Radio	Nuseirat refugee camp	Killed by Israeli bombing.
December 7, 2023	Saeed Al-Shorbaji		Khan Yunis	Killed along with his family.
December 9, 2023	Ola Atallah		Daraj Quarter, Gaza City	Killed along with nine relatives in an Israeli airstrike.
December 9, 2023	Mohamed Abu Samra	Photojournalist	Southern Gaza	Israeli bombardment.
December 9, 2023	Duaa Jabbour	According to the International Federation of Journalists, a freelance journalist for the local website Eyes Media Network. Not a journalist or media worker according to the Committee to Protect Journalists.	Khan Yunis	Killed in an Israeli airstrike on her residence.
December 11, 2023	Narmeen Qawwas	Russia Today	Gaza	Killed in an Israeli airstrike on her home.
December 13, 2023	Hanan Ayyad	Freelance journalist	Shuja'iyya	Israeli airstrike.
December 13, 2023	Abdel Kareem Odeh		Nuseirat refugee camp	Airstrike.
December 13, 2023	Ahmed Abu Absa		Gaza	Israeli airstrike
December 15, 2023	Samer Abu Daqqa	Al Jazeera (cameraman)	Khan Yunis	Killed in an Israeli missile strike on a school that also injured bureau chief Wael Al-Dahdouh.
December 15, 2023	Rami Badir	New Press and Hadaf News	Khan Yunis	Israeli attack.
December 17, 2023	Assem Moussa	Palestine Now	Khan Yunis	Airstrike.
December 17, 2023	Haneen Kashtan	Al-Kofiya TV and Baladna TV	Nuseirat refugee camp	Airstrike.
December 18, 2023	Abdallah Alwan	photographer	Gaza City	Israeli missile strike.
December 19, 2023	Adel Zorob	Al-Aqsa Voice Radio	Rafah	Killed in an Israeli airstrike along with his family.
December 21, 2023	Ala Abu Muammar		Khan Yunis	Killed in an Israeli airstrike along with his family.
December 22, 2023	Mohamed Khalifeh	Al-Aqsa TV (director)	Nuseirat refugee camp	Airstrike
December 23, 2023	Mohamed Naser Abu Huwaidi	Al-Istiklal newspaper	Northern Gaza	Killed in an Israeli airstrike in while covering the aftermath of previous airstrikes. According to the Committee to Protect Journalists, he participated in combat.
December 24, 2023	Ahmad Jamal Al Madhoun	Al Rai Agency (deputy director)		Airstrike
December 24, 2023	Mohamed Azzaytouniyah	Al-Rai (sound engineer)	Gaza City	Airstrike
December 24, 2023	Mohamad Al-Iff	Al-Rai (sound photographer)	Gaza City	Airstrike
December 28, 2023	Ahmed Khair al-Din	Photojournalist	Beit Lahia	Airstrike
December 28, 2023	Mohammad Khair al-Din		Beit Lahia	Airstrike
December 29, 2023	Jabr Abu Hadros	Al-Quds TV	Nuseirat refugee camp	Killed by an Israeli airstrike on his residence.
December 30, 2023	Narmeem Harboush	Media program coordinator and board member at PYALARA (Palestinian Youth Association for Leadership and Rights Activation)	Gaza City	Israeli airstrike
January 7, 2024	Hamza al-Dahdouh	Al Jazeera	Khan Yunis	Killed by an Israeli airstrike on their vehicle. Hamza al-Dahdouh was also a son of Wael Al-Dahdouh.
January 7, 2024	Mustafa Thuraya	Freelance journalist	Khan Yunis	Killed by an Israeli airstrike on their vehicle. Hamza al-Dahdouh was also a son of Wael Al-Dahdouh.
January 7, 2024	Abu Ali Ajwa		Gaza City	Killed in an Israeli airstrike. Also the grandson of Sheikh Ahmed Yassin, the founder of Hamas.
January 9, 2024	Heba Al-Abadla	Al-Azhar Radio (host)	Khan Yunis	Killed along with her daughter and several relatives in an Israeli airstrike.
January 10, 2024	Shareef Okasha	Freelance photographer for various media outlets	Deir al-Balah	Killed by shrapnel.
January 10, 2024	Ahmed Badir	Al-Hadaf	Deir al-Balah	Killed in an Israeli airstrike near the Al-Aqsa Martyrs' Hospital
January 11, 2024	Mohamed Jamal Sobhi Al-Thalathini	Al-Quds Al-Youm	southern Gaza Strip	Killed in an Israeli airstrike on his residence.
January 14, 2024	Yazan Al-Zuweidi	Al-Ghad TV (cameraman)	Beit Hanoun	Killed in an Israeli airstrike along with his brother and cousin
January 18, 2024	Wael Fanouneh	Al-Quds TV (news director)	Gaza City	Airstrike
January 21, 2024	Karam Ahmed Abu Ajiram	Freelance journalist	Abasan al-Kabira, Khan Yunis	Killed by Israeli bombing
January 26, 2024	Eyad al-Rawagh		Nuseirat refugee camp	Killed by an Israeli airstrike, along with eleven members of his family, including a newborn son.
January 27, 2024	Iyad Ahmed al-Rawag	Sawt Al-Aqsa Radio	Nuseirat refugee camp	
January 29, 2024	Mohammed Atallah	Al-Resalah (editor) and Raseef22 (writer)	Shati refugee camp	Killed in an Israeli airstrike along with several relatives
February 7, 2024	Rizq Al-Gharabli	Palestinian Information Center (director)	Khan Yunis	Israeli bombardment
February 8, 2024	Nafez Abdel Jawad	Palestine TV	as-Salam, Deir al-Balah	Killed in an Israeli missile attack on a residential building
February 11, 2024	Yasser Mamdouh El-Fady	Kan'an news agency	Nasser Hospital, Khan Yunis	Shot by an Israeli sniper
February 12, 2024	Angam Ahmad Edwan	February TV	Jabalia	Killed in an Israeli airstrike on her residence
February 12, 2024	Ala'a al-Hums	al-Masirah TV	Rafah	Killed in Israeli shelling of her residence
February 14, 2024	Ayman Al-Rafati	Al Mayadeen (contributor)	Al Jalaa Street, Gaza City	Killed along with his brother, sister in law, and nephews in an Israeli airstrike on his residence
February 15, 2024	Zayd Abu Zayed	Quran Radio (director)	Nuseirat refugee camp	Israeli airstrike
February 21, 2024	Ihab Nasrallah		Zeitoun, Gaza City	Killed along with his wife
February 23, 2024	Mohamed Yaghi	Freelance photojournalist	Az-Zawayda, Deir al-Balah	Killed along with his family
March 5, 2024	Muhammad Salama	Al-Aqsa TV (host)	Deir al-Balah	Killed along with his family in an Israeli airstrike on his residence.
March 14, 2024	Abdul Rahman Saima	Raqami TV (photojournalist)	Bureij refugee camp	Airstrike
March 15, 2024	Mohamed El-Reefi	Freelance photographer	Southeast of Gaza City	Shot by the IDF while trying to obtain flour during a humanitarian aid delivery
March 25, 2024	Saher Akram Rayan	Wafa	Gaza City	Killed along with his son in an Israeli strike while assisting injured neighbors
March 29, 2024	Mohammad Abu Sukheil	Sawt Al-Quds Radio and Shms News Agency (editor and graphic designer)	Al-Shifa Hospital	Shot by the IDF According to the Committee to Protect Journalists, he had engaged in combat.
April 24, 2024	Amna Hamid	Poet and journalist	Al-Shati refugee camp	Bombed in her home alongside her two children
April 25, 2024	Mohammed Bassam Al Jamal	Palestine Now news agency (photographer)	Al-Jenenah, Rafah	Killed in an Israeli airstrike on his residence along with six relatives. According to the Committee to Protect Journalists, he had engaged in combat.
April 26, 2024	Ayman Mohamad Al-Gharbawi	Freelance photojournalist	Hamad City	Killed in an Israeli drone strike
April 26, 2024	Ibrahim Mohamad Al-Gharbawi	freelance photojournalist	Hamad City	Killed in an Israeli drone strike
April 29, 2024	Salem Abu Toyour	Al-Quds Al-Youm TV	Nuseirat refugee camp	Killed in an Israeli airstrike on his residence along with two relatives According to the Committee to Protect Journalists, he had engaged in combat.
May 6, 2024	Mustafa Ayyad	Freelance journalist	Zeitoun	Airstrike on his residence
May 11, 2024	Bahaa Okasha	Al-Aqsa Media Network photojournalist. Not a journalist or media worker according to the Committee to Protect Journalists.	Al-Qasasib, Jabalia refugee camp	Killed alongside his wife and son in an Israeli strike on his home.
May 16, 2024	Amna Mahmoud Hamid			Killed by Israeli forces
May 16, 2024	Moataz Mustafa Al-Ghafrit	Ard Canaan and the Palestinian Media Corporation (photojournalist)		Killed by Israeli forces
May 16, 2024	Mahmoud Jahjouh	Palestine Post (photojournalist).		Killed by Israeli forces
May 16, 2024	Hael Al-Najjar	Al-Aqsa Media Network (editor)		Killed by Israeli forces
June 1, 2024	Ola al-Dahdouh		Gaza City	Killed in an Israeli airstrike in her residence
June 9, 2024	Abdullah Ahmed Al-Jamal	Palestine Now and Palestine Chronicle (editor)	Nuseirat refugee camp	Killed by Israeli forces while holding Israeli hostages in his home.
June 9, 2024	Ahlam Ezzat Al-Ajla	Family Happiness Magazine	Nuseirat refugee camp	Killed by Israeli forces
June 9, 2024	Dina Abdullah Al-Batniji	Al-Thuraya Media Foundation	Nuseirat refugee camp	Killed by Israeli forces
June 17, 2024	Mahmoud Qassem	Palestine Online		Killed by Israeli forces
June 20, 2024	Salim al-Sharafa	Al-Aqsa TV		Killed by an Israeli airstrike
July 1, 2024	Muhammad Mahmoud Abu Sharia	Shams News Agency		Killed by Israeli forces
July 5, 2024	Ahmad Sukar		Daraj, Gaza City	Killed along with one other by Israeli forces.
July 5, 2024	Saadi Madoukh		Daraj, Gaza City	Killed along with one other by Israeli forces.
July 6, 2024	Rizq Abu Shakyan	Palestine Media Agency	Nuseirat refugee camp	Israeli airstrike. According to the Committee to Protect Journalists, he had participated in combat.
July 6, 2024	Amjad Jahjouh	Palestine Media Agency	Nuseirat refugee camp	Israeli airstrike
July 6, 2024	Wafa Abu Dabaan	Islamic University Radio	Nuseirat refugee camp	Killed along with 10 people including his wife and children by an Israeli airstrike.
July 13, 2024	Muhammad Manhal Abu Armana		Khan Yunis	Israeli airstrike. According to the Committee to Protect Journalists, he participated in combat.
July 16, 2024	Muhammad Abdullah Mishmish	Sawt Al-Awsa Radio (programme director)	Al-Razi School, Nuseirat refugee camp	Killed by Israeli forces
July 20, 2024	Muhammad Abu Jasser		Jabalia refugee camp	Killed by an Israeli airstrike along with his wife and two children
July 21, 2024	Mutasim Mahmoud Gharab			Killed by Israeli forces
July 22, 2024	Haider Ibrahim al-Masdar		Shuhada al-Aqsa Hospital, Deir al-Balah	Israeli airstrike on a media tent
July 31, 2024	Ismail al-Ghoul	Al Jazeera Arabic (Correspondent)	Al-Shati refugee camp	Killed by Israeli forces
July 31, 2024	Rami al-Rifee	Al Jazeera Arabic (Cameraman)	Al-Shati refugee camp	Killed by Israeli forces
August 6, 2024	Mohammed Issa Abu Saada	Sahat and Shariqya Pulse (freelance photographer)	Khan Yunis	Killed by Israeli forces
August 9, 2024	Tamim Muammar		Khan Yunis	Killed by an Israeli airstrike along with six other people
August 19, 2024	Ibrahim Muharab	Freelance	Hamad City	Killed by Israeli forces
August 20, 2024	Hamza Abdul Rahman Murtaja	Photographer and journalist	Gaza City	Killed by Israeli airstrike on school
August 22, 2024	Hussam al-Dabbaka	Al-Quds Al-Youm (Camera operator)	Maghazi refugee camp	Killed in an airstrike along with several family members According to the Committee to Protect Journalists, he had engaged in combat.
August 26, 2024	Medo Halimy	Journalist	Khan Yunis	Killed by Israeli airstrike
August 26, 2024	Ali Tuaima		Khan Yunis	Israeli airstrike
August 28, 2024	Mohamed Abd Rabbo	Al Manara Media	Nuseirat refugee camp	Killed by an Israeli aerial attack along with his sister, Sumaya Abd Rabbo, who was also a journalist
September 15, 2024	Abdullah Shakshak		Southern Gaza Strip	Killed by an Israeli quadcopter
September 30, 2024	Wafa Al-Udaini		Deir al-Balah	Killed by an Israeli airstrike in an area deemed a "safe humanitarian zone" along with three family members, including two children
October 6, 2024	Hassan Hamad	Freelance journalist	Northern Jabalia	Killed by an Israeli airstrike on his home.
October 6, 2024	Abdul Rahman Bahr	Palestine Breaking News (photographer and camera operator)	Gaza City	Killed by an Israeli drone strike.
October 9, 2024	Mohammed Tanani	Al-Aqsa TV	Jabalia	Killed while covering the siege of Jabalia.
October 9, 2024	Omar al-Balawi		Jabalia	Killed while covering the siege of Jabalia.
October 14, 2024	Ayman Muhammad Ruwaished	Unknown (photojournalist)		Killed by Israeli forces
October 27, 2024	Saed Radwan	Al-Aqsa TV		Killed by Israeli attacks
October 27, 2024	Hamza Abu Salmiya	Sanad News Agency		Killed by Israeli attacks
October 27, 2024	Haneen Baroud	Al-Quds Foundation		Killed by Israeli attacks
November 1, 2024	Bilal Rajab	Al-Quds al-Youm TV		Killed by Israeli bombardment
November 2, 2024	Baraa Ali Daghish	Unknown (photojournalist)	Nuseirat refugee camp	Killed by Israeli forces
November 8, 2024	Khaled Abu Zir	An unknown local news outlet		Killed by Israeli forces
November 9, 2024	Ahmed Abu Sakhil		Fahd al-Sabah school, Tuffah, Gaza City	Killed by an Israeli airstrike alongside their father
November 9, 2024	Zahra Abu Sakhil		Fahd al-Sabah school, Tuffah, Gaza City	Killed by an Israeli airstrike alongside their father
November 11, 2024	Mohammed Khreis		Nuseirat refugee camp	Killed by Israeli forces alongside his wife
November 11, 2024	Mahdi al-Mamluk	Al-Quds Al-Youm TV (broadcast engineer)	Western Gaza City	Killed in an Israeli airstrike According to the Committee to Protect Journalists, he participated in combat.
November 16, 2024	Mohammed Saleh al-Sharif		Northern Gaza Strip	Killed by an Israeli drone along with his cousin
November 19, 2024	Ahmed Abu Sharia	Editor and photographer for several media outlets	Sabra, Gaza	Killed when Israeli tanks shelled his home. According to the Committee to Protect Journalists, he engaged in combat.
November 20, 2024	Mahmoud al-Khatib		Rimal	Israeli airstrike
November 20, 2024	Abdul Rahim al-Tahrawi		Rimal	Israeli airstrike
November 22, 2024	Wael Abu Quffa	Lecturer at the Department of Journalism and Media of the Islamic University of Gaza	Gaza	Israeli airstrike
November 27, 2024	Alaa Fawzi Barhoum	Editor for several news outlets	Gaza City	Israeli airstrikes on the al-Tabi'in School in Gaza City
November 30, 2024	Mamdouh Quneita	Al-Aqsa satellite channel (editor)	Al-Ahli Arab Hospital	Killed by Israeli forces
December 1, 2024	Maysara Ahmed Salah	Quds News Network	Gaza	Killed in an Israeli attack According to the Committee to Protect Journalists, he participated in combat.
December 5, 2024	Mohammad Hijazi		Jabalia refugee camp	Israeli airstrike
December 11, 2024	Iman al-Shanti	Al-Aqsa Voice Radio	Sheikh Radwan	Killed in an Israeli airstrike along with her family
December 14, 2024	Mohammed Baalousha	Al-Mashhad Channel		Killed in an Israeli airstrike
December 14, 2024	Mohammed Jaber Al-Qerainawi	Sanad News Agency	Al-Saftawi	Killed in an Israeli airstrike along with his family
December 15, 2024	Ahmed al-Louh	Al Jazeera (cameraman)	Nuseirat refugee camp	Killed in an Israeli airstrike along with five Palestinian Civil Defence workers
December 21, 2024	Hazem Abu Arqoub		Khan Yunis	Killed in an Israeli airstrike along with his wife
December 26, 2024	Fadi Hassouna	Al Quds Today	Al Awda Hospital, Nuseirat Camp	Killed by a targeted Israeli airstrike on a vehicle marked with "Press".
December 26, 2024	Ibrahim Al-Sheikh Ali	Al Quds Today	Al Awda Hospital, Nuseirat Camp	Killed by a targeted Israeli airstrike on a vehicle marked with "Press".
December 26, 2024	Ayman Al-Jadi	Al Quds Today	Al Awda Hospital, Nuseirat Camp	Killed by a targeted Israeli airstrike on a vehicle marked with "Press".
December 26, 2024	Mohammed Al-Lada'a	Al Quds Today	Al Awda Hospital, Nuseirat Camp	Killed by a targeted Israeli airstrike on a vehicle marked with "Press".
December 26, 2024	Faisal Abu Al-Qumsan	Al Quds Today	Al Awda Hospital, Nuseirat Camp	Killed by a targeted Israeli airstrike on a vehicle marked with "Press".
December 27, 2024	Shatha al-Sabbagh		Jenin	Shot in the head during clashes between militants and Palestinian National Security Forces, her family blamed the PA security forces while the PA blamed the insurgent groups in Jenin.
January 2, 2025	Hassan al-Qishaoui	Photojournalist	Gaza	Killed by an Israeli drone
January 3, 2025	Omar Salah Al-Derawi	Photojournalist for several news agencies	Az-Zawayda	Killed by Israeli bombing.
January 3, 2025	Areej Shaheen	Freelance photographer	Nuseirat refugee camp	Killed by Israeli bombing.
January 10, 2025	Saed Abu Nabhan	Anadolu Agency (freelance cameraman)	Al-Jadeed refugee camp, Nuseirat	Israeli long-range rifle attack
January 13, 2025	Ahlam Nafeth Al-Taluli		Gaza City	Israeli airstrike
January 14, 2025	Mohammed al-Talmas	Safa News Agency	Sheikh Radwan	Israeli airstrike
January 15, 2025	Aqel Saleh		Shati refugee camp	Israeli airstrike
January 15, 2025	Ahmed Abu Alrous		Nuseirat refugee camp	Israeli airstrike
January 15, 2025	Ahmad al-Shayah		Khan Yunis	Israeli drone strike
March 15, 2025	Alaa Hashim		Gaza City	Died after sustaining injuries from Israeli bombardment
March 15, 2025	Mahmoud al-Sarraj	Cameraman	Beit Lahia	Killed by Israeli airstrikes
March 15, 2025	Bilal Abu Matar	Video editor	Beit Lahia	Killed by Israeli airstrikes
March 15, 2025	Mahmoud Isleem al-Basos	Cameraman	Beit Lahia	Killed by Israeli airstrikes
March 17, 2025	Husam al-Titi	Former ABC News journalist	Deir al-Balah	Israeli airstrike
March 24, 2025	Mohammed Mansur	Palestine Today (correspondent)	Khan Yunis	Israeli airstrike
March 24, 2025	Hossam Shabat	Al Jazeera Mubasher	Beit Hanoun	Israeli airstrike, was previously injured and, without evidence, accused of being a militant by the Israeli Defense Force
March 31, 2025	Mohammed Saleh Al-Bardawil	Al-Aqsa Radio	Khan Yunis	Israeli airstrike
April 6, 2025	Islam Miqdad		Khan Yunis	Killed in an Israeli airstrike along with her son
April 7, 2025	Helmi al-Faqawi	Palestine Today	Nasser Hospital, Khan Yunis	Was in a media tent targeted by an Israeli airstrike which set it ablaze
April 7, 2025	Ahmad Mansoor		Nasser Hospital, Khan Yunis	Was rescued from the fire with severe burns, but later died from his injuries
April 16, 2025	Fatima Hassouna	Photojournalist	Tuffah, Gaza City	Israeli airstrike, killed along with 10 of her relatives
April 23, 2025	Saeed Abu Hassainen	Al-Aqsa Voice Radio	Deir al-Balah	Died after sustaining wounds from an Israeli airstrike
May 7, 2025	Noor al-Din Matar Abdu		Tuffah, Gaza	Killed in an Israeli airstrike at Karama School, Tuffah.
May 7, 2025	Yahya Sobeih		Rimal, Gaza City	Killed in an Israeli airstrike hours after his newborn daughter was born
May 13, 2025	Hassan Aslih	Alam24 News Agency (Photojournalist, editor and director)	Khan Yunis	Killed in an Israeli airstrike while receiving treatment at Nasser Hospital
May 15, 2025	Hassan Samour	Al-Aqsa Voice Radio	Khan Yunis	Killed in Israeli airstrikes along with 11 members of his family
May 15, 2025	Ahmed Al-Helou		Khan Yunis	Killed in an Israeli airstrike
May 17, 2025	Aziz al-Hajjar	Photojournalist	Bir an-Naaja, northern Gaza	Killed by Israeli forces alongside his wife and children
May 17, 2025	Nour Qandil		Deir al-Balah	Killed alongside her husband and infant daughter during an Israeli attack on her home
May 17, 2025	Abdul Rahman al-Abadleh		al-Qarara, Khan Yunis	Went missing two days prior, his death was confirmed by the al-Quds Network.
May 17, 2025	Ahmed al-Zenati		Khan Yunis	Killed along with his wife and their two children.
May 17, 2025	Khaled Abu Seif		Deir al-Balah	Killed in an Israeli airstrike along with his wife and daughter.
May 23, 2025	Yaqeen Hammad	11-year-old digital journalist/media personality and Ouena Collective volunteer	Al-Baraka, Deir al-Balah	Israeli airstrike
May 23, 2025	Bilal al-Hatoum		Al-Saftawi	Israeli airstrike
May 25, 2025	Hassan Majdi Abu Warda		Jabalia	Killed in an Israeli airstrike alongside an unknown number of relatives
May 28, 2025	Moataz Rajab	Al-Quds TV (editor)	Gaza City	Killed in an Israeli airstrike
May 31, 2025	Yousef al-Nakhala	Satellite broadcast engineer	Gaza City	Killed in an Israeli airstrike
June 5, 2025	Suleiman Hajjaj	Palestine Today (correspondent)	Al-Ahli Arab Hospital, Gaza City	Israeli airstrike, killed alongside two of their relatives.
June 5, 2025	Ismail Badah	Palestine Today (cameraman)	Al-Ahli Arab Hospital, Gaza City	Israeli airstrike, killed alongside two of their relatives.
June 5, 2025	Samir Al-Rifai	Shams News Agency	Al-Ahli Arab Hospital, Gaza City	Israeli airstrike, killed alongside two of their relatives.
June 5, 2025	Ahmad Qalaja	Al Araby Television Network (cameraman)	Al-Ahli Arab Hospital, Gaza City	Israeli airstrike, killed alongside two of their relatives.
June 9, 2025	Moamen Abu Alouf		Tuffah	Killed by Israeli airstrikes along with three other paramedic workers
June 22, 2025	Amin Hamdan		Central Gaza	Killed in an Israeli attack along with his wife and two daughters
June 25, 2025	Mahmoud Abu Sharbi		Northern Gaza	Killed by an Israeli airstrike
June 30, 2025	Ismail Abu Hatab	Photojournalist	Gaza City	Killed by an airstrike along with 33 others after Israeli forces targeted a beachside cafe.
July 11, 2025	Ahmad Salama Abu Aisha		Sawarha, Nuseirat	Killed by an Israeli drone in front of his home. According to the Committee to Protect Journalists, he engaged in combat.
July 13, 2025	Hussam Al-Adlouni		Al-Mawasi	Killed along with his wife and three children after Israeli forces targeted them in a tent.
July 13, 2025	Fadi Khalifa		Zeitoun, Gaza City	Killed in an Israeli strike while inspecting his home
July 21, 2025	Tamer Al-Zaanin	Freelance photojournalist	Al-Mawasi, Khan Yunis	Killed in an Israeli raid
July 23, 2025	Walaa Al-Jabari	Editor	Tel al-Hawa	Killed in an Israeli airstrike while pregnant, along with her husband and four of their children
July 25, 2025	Adam Abu Harbid	Photojournalist	Al-Yarmouk Market, Gaza City	Killed by an Israeli helicopter strike, along with three of his relatives
July 30, 2025	Ibrahim Hajjaj		Gaza City	Killed by an Israeli airstrike
August 1, 2025	Marwa Musallam	Al Shabab Radio	Tuffah, Gaza City	Killed in her home by an Israeli airstrike along with her two brothers. Her skeletal remains were later discovered on 16 August.
August 10, 2025	Anas Al-Sharif	Al-Jazeera (correspondent)	Al-Shifa Hospital	Killed in an Israeli airstrike targeting Al-Sharif. Two non-journalists were killed as well. Freelance reporter Mohammed al-Khaldi was also among those reported killed.
August 10, 2025	Mohammed Qreiqeh	Al-Jazeera (correspondent)	Al-Shifa Hospital	Killed in an Israeli airstrike targeting Al-Sharif. Two non-journalists were killed as well. Freelance reporter Mohammed al-Khaldi was also among those reported killed.
August 10, 2025	Ibrahim Zaher	Al-Jazeera (cameraman)	Al-Shifa Hospital	Killed in an Israeli airstrike targeting Al-Sharif. Two non-journalists were killed as well. Freelance reporter Mohammed al-Khaldi was also among those reported killed.
August 10, 2025	Mohammed Noufal	Al-Jazeera (cameraman)	Al-Shifa Hospital	Killed in an Israeli airstrike targeting Al-Sharif. Two non-journalists were killed as well. Freelance reporter Mohammed al-Khaldi was also among those reported killed.
August 10, 2025	Moamen Aliwa	Al-Jazeera (cameraman)	Al-Shifa Hospital	Killed in an Israeli airstrike targeting Al-Sharif. Two non-journalists were killed as well. Freelance reporter Mohammed al-Khaldi was also among those reported killed.
August 11, 2025	Ziad Al-Razi	Palestinian Broadcasting Corporation	Gaza City	Killed by an Israeli airstrike
August 18, 2025	Islam al-Koumi		Sabra, Gaza City	Killed in an Israeli airstrike.
August 23, 2025	Khaled al-Madhoun	Palestine TV (cameraman)	Zikim	Killed in an Israeli strike.
August 25, 2025	Hussam al-Masri	Reuters (cameraman)	Nasser Hospital	Killed in an Israeli airstrike along with 16 others.
August 25, 2025	Mariam Dagga	Associated Press and Independent Arabia (freelance journalist)	Nasser Hospital	Killed in an Israeli airstrike along with 16 others.
August 25, 2025	Mohammed Salama	Al Jazeera Media Network and Middle East Eye	Nasser Hospital	Killed in an Israeli airstrike along with 16 others.
August 25, 2025	Moaz Abu Taha	NBC (photographer)	Nasser Hospital	Killed in an Israeli airstrike along with 16 others.
August 25, 2025	Ahmed Abu Aziz	Quds Feed Network and Middle East Eye	Nasser Hospital	Killed in an Israeli airstrike along with 16 others.
August 25, 2025	Hassan Douhan	Al-Hayat Al-Jadida	Al-Mawasi, Khan Yunis	Shot by Israeli forces
August 31, 2025	Islam Abed	Al-Quds Today TV (correspondent)	Rimal, Gaza City	Killed along with her husband and children after Israeli forces shelled a residential apartment.
September 2, 2025	Rasmi Jihad Salem	Manara Media Company (cameraman)	Gaza City	Killed in an Israeli drone strike.
September 2, 2025	Iman Ahmad Al-Zamli		Khan Yunis	Killed by drone fire while collecting water near the Hamad Towers in Khan Yunis.
September 2, 2025	Ayman Haniyeh	Manara Media Company (Broadcast engineer)	Jordanian Hospital, Gaza City	Killed by an Israeli strike.
September 8, 2025	Osama Balousha		Sheikh Radwan, Gaza City	Killed by an Israeli airstrike on his home.
September 15, 2025	Mohammad al-Kuwaifi		Al-Nasr, Gaza City	Killed when Israeli forces struck a tent sheltering Palestinians
September 18, 2025	Mohammed Alaa al-Sawalhi	Al-Quds Today (Photojournalist)	Gaza City	Killed in an Israeli airstrike.
September 27, 2025	Mohammed al-Daya	The Palestinian Information Center	Deir al-Balah	Shot by Israeli forces.
September 30, 2025	Yahya Barzaq	TRT World	Deir al-Balah	Killed by an Israeli airstrike.
October 6, 2025	Enas Ramadan		Al-Nasr, Gaza City	Killed by an Israeli airstrike.
October 12, 2025	Saleh al-Jafarawi		Sabra, Gaza	Killed by the Palestinian Doghmush clan while reporting clashes between the group and Hamas fighters.
October 19, 2025	Ahmed Abu Mutair	Palestine Media Company and ZDF (broadcast engineer)	Al-Zawaida, central Gaza	Killed by an Israeli strike along with an eight-year-old child at the offices of the Palestine Media Company.
October 29, 2025	Mohammed Al-Munirawi	Felesteen News	Nuseirat, Gaza	Killed by an Israeli airstrike along with his wife in a tent during the ceasefire.
December 2, 2025	Mahmoud Wadi	Photographer	Khan Yunis	Killed by an Israeli airstrike.
January 21, 2026	Abdul Raouf Shaat	Agence France-Presse and CBS News (Photo and videojournalist)	Al-Zahra	Killed by an Israeli airstrike.
January 21, 2026	Mohammed Salah Qashta	Photojournalist	Al-Zahra	Killed by an Israeli airstrike.
January 21, 2026	Anas Ghneim	Photojournalist	Al-Zahra	Killed by an Israeli airstrike.
March 9, 2026	Amal Shamali	Qatar Radio (correspondent)	Nuseirat refugee camp	Killed by an Israeli airstrike.
April 8, 2026	Mohammed Washah	Al Jazeera Mubasher (correspondent)	Gaza City	Killed by an Israeli drone strike.
June 20, 2026	Ahmad Washah	Al Jazeera (cameraman)	Bureij refugee camp	Brother of Mohammed Washah. Killed by an Israeli airstrike alongside another Palestinian and injured another. A day later the IDF accused him of being a "Hamas terrorist" without providing evidence.
September 30, 2026	Muhammad Abdel Aziz al-Najjar	Holy Quran Radio	Al-Qarara, Al-Mawasi	Killed by an Israeli drone strike.

== Lebanon ==
Lebanese journalists killed in the Gaza war
Date	Name	Agency/Position	Location	Description
October 13, 2023	Issam Abdallah	Reuters (videographer)	Aalma ech Chaab	Killed in an Israeli artillery strike targeting a group of reporters
November 21, 2023	Farah Hisham Omar	Al Mayadeen (correspondent)	Tayr Harfa	Israeli airstrike
November 21, 2023	Rabih Al Maamari	Al Mayadeen (cameraman)	Tayr Harfa	Israeli airstrike
September 23, 2024	Hadi Al-Sayed	Al Mayadeen	Borj Rahhal	Killed by an Israeli airstrike on his home
September 25, 2024	Kamel Karaki	Al-Manar (cameraman)	Qantara	Killed by an Israeli airstrike
October 25, 2024	Ghassan Najar	Al Mayadeen (cameraman)	Hasbaya	Killed either by an Israeli drone strike or an Israeli missile strike
October 25, 2024	Mohammed Rida	Al Mayadeen (broadcast technician)	Hasbaya	Killed either by an Israeli drone strike or an Israeli missile strike
October 25, 2024	Wissam Qassim	Al-Manar (cameraman)	Hasbaya	Killed either by an Israeli drone strike or an Israeli missile strike
November 13, 2024	Sakina Mansour	al-Nour Radio Station	Joun	Killed by an Israeli airstrike along with her two sons and other family members
February 16, 2025	Ahmad Farhat	Nabaa TV		Killed in an Israeli airstrike
January 26, 2026	Ali Nour al-Din	Al-Manar (presenter)	Tyre	Killed in an Israeli airstrike
March 18, 2026	Mohammad Shari	Al-Manar (director)	Zuqaq al-Blat, Beirut	Killed in an Israeli airstrike that also killed his wife and injured his children and grandchildren.
March 25, 2026	Hussain Hamood	Al Manar (photojournalist and camera operator)	Nabatieh	Killed by an Israeli strike while filming an Israeli raid in the city.
March 28, 2026	Ali Shaib	Al Manar (reporter)	Jezzine, southern Lebanon	Killed after an Israeli strike targeted their vehicle.
March 28, 2026	Fatima Ftouni	Al Mayadeen (broadcaster)	Jezzine, southern Lebanon	Killed after an Israeli strike targeted their vehicle.
March 28, 2026	Mohammed Ftouni	Al Mayadeen (cameraman)	Jezzine, southern Lebanon	Killed after an Israeli strike targeted their vehicle.
April 7, 2026	Ghada Dayekh	Sawt Al-Farah (presenter)	Tyre	Killed when her apartment building was struck by Israeli forces.
April 8, 2026	Suzan Khalil	Al-Manar (presenter and reporter)	Kfoun	Killed by an Israeli strike.
April 22, 2026	Amal Khalil	Al-Akhbar	At-Tiri	Killed by an Israeli airstrike.

== Israel ==
Israeli journalists killed in the Gaza war
Date	Name	Agency/Position	Location	Description
October 7, 2023	Yaniv Zohar	Israel Hayom (photographer)	Nahal Oz	Killed along with his wife, two daughters, and father-in-law during the Nahal Oz attack
October 7, 2023	Roee Idan	Ynet (photographer)	Kfar Aza	Killed along with his wife during the Kfar Aza massacre.
October 7, 2023	Shai Regev	Maariv (entertainment writer)	Re'im	Killed during the Nova music festival massacre.
October 7, 2023	Ayelet Arnin	Kan (news editor)	Re'im	Killed during the Nova music festival massacre.
After October 7, 2023	Oded Lifshitz		Captivity in Gaza	Shot and kidnapped in Kibbutz Nir Oz, killed in captivity about a month later. According to the Committee to Protect Journalists, he was not on assignment at the time of his capture.

== Syria ==
Syrian journalists killed in the Gaza war
Date	Name	Agency/Position	Location	Description
October 1, 2024	Safaa Ahmad	Syria TV	Mezzeh	Killed by an Israeli airstrike

== Iran ==
Iranian journalists killed in the Gaza war
Date	Name	Agency/Position	Location	Description
June 13, 2025	Fereshteh Bagheri	Defa News Agency	Tehran	Killed by Israeli airstrikes during the Twelve-Day War
June 15, 2025	Saleh Bairami	Andishe Pooya Magazine (Freelance cartoonist)	Tehran	Killed by Israeli airstrikes during the Twelve-Day War
June 16, 2025	Nima Rajabpour	Khabar (Editor)	Tehran	Killed by Israeli airstrikes during the Twelve-Day War
June 16, 2025	Masoumeh Azimi	Islamic Republic of Iran Broadcasting (Secretariat staffer)	Tehran	Killed by Israeli airstrikes during the Twelve-Day War

== Yemen ==
Yemeni journalists killed in the Gaza war
Date	Name	Agency/Position	Location	Description
September 10, 2025	Abdulaziz Al-Sheikh	26 September Newspaper or Yemen newspaper	A newspaper complex, Sanaa	Killed by Israeli attacks. The deadliest massacre of journalists since the Maguindanao massacre.
September 10, 2025	Abbas Al-Dailami	26 September Newspaper or Yemen newspaper	A newspaper complex, Sanaa	Killed by Israeli attacks. The deadliest massacre of journalists since the Maguindanao massacre.
September 10, 2025	Youssef Shams Al-Din Al-Bahri	26 September Newspaper or Yemen newspaper	A newspaper complex, Sanaa	Killed by Israeli attacks. The deadliest massacre of journalists since the Maguindanao massacre.
September 10, 2025	Mohammed Al-Omeisi	26 September Newspaper or Yemen newspaper	A newspaper complex, Sanaa	Killed by Israeli attacks. The deadliest massacre of journalists since the Maguindanao massacre.
September 10, 2025	Abdullah Al-Harazi	26 September Newspaper or Yemen newspaper	A newspaper complex, Sanaa	Killed by Israeli attacks. The deadliest massacre of journalists since the Maguindanao massacre.
September 10, 2025	Murad Halboub Al-Faqih	26 September Newspaper or Yemen newspaper	A newspaper complex, Sanaa	Killed by Israeli attacks. The deadliest massacre of journalists since the Maguindanao massacre.
September 10, 2025	Ali Naji Al-Shara'i	26 September Newspaper or Yemen newspaper	A newspaper complex, Sanaa	Killed by Israeli attacks. The deadliest massacre of journalists since the Maguindanao massacre.
September 10, 2025	Ali Mohammed Al-Aqel	26 September Newspaper or Yemen newspaper	A newspaper complex, Sanaa	Killed by Israeli attacks. The deadliest massacre of journalists since the Maguindanao massacre.
September 10, 2025	Jamal Al-Adhi	26 September Newspaper or Yemen newspaper	A newspaper complex, Sanaa	Killed by Israeli attacks. The deadliest massacre of journalists since the Maguindanao massacre.
September 10, 2025	Sami Mohammed Hussein Al-Zaidi	26 September Newspaper or Yemen newspaper	A newspaper complex, Sanaa	Killed by Israeli attacks. The deadliest massacre of journalists since the Maguindanao massacre.
September 10, 2025	Mohammed Ismail Hazam Al-Amsi	26 September Newspaper or Yemen newspaper	A newspaper complex, Sanaa	Killed by Israeli attacks. The deadliest massacre of journalists since the Maguindanao massacre.
September 10, 2025	Bashir Hussein Ahsan Dablan	26 September Newspaper or Yemen newspaper	A newspaper complex, Sanaa	Killed by Israeli attacks. The deadliest massacre of journalists since the Maguindanao massacre.
September 10, 2025	Aref Ali Abdo Al-Samahi	26 September Newspaper or Yemen newspaper	A newspaper complex, Sanaa	Killed by Israeli attacks. The deadliest massacre of journalists since the Maguindanao massacre.
September 10, 2025	Mohammed Hamoud Ahmed Al-Matari	26 September Newspaper or Yemen newspaper	A newspaper complex, Sanaa	Killed by Israeli attacks. The deadliest massacre of journalists since the Maguindanao massacre.
September 10, 2025	Abdul Wali Abdo Hussein Al-Najjar	26 September Newspaper or Yemen newspaper	A newspaper complex, Sanaa	Killed by Israeli attacks. The deadliest massacre of journalists since the Maguindanao massacre.
September 10, 2025	Abdo Taher Musleh Al-Saadi	26 September Newspaper or Yemen newspaper	A newspaper complex, Sanaa	Killed by Israeli attacks. The deadliest massacre of journalists since the Maguindanao massacre.
September 10, 2025	Abdulaziz Saleh Ahmed Shas	26 September Newspaper or Yemen newspaper	A newspaper complex, Sanaa	Killed by Israeli attacks. The deadliest massacre of journalists since the Maguindanao massacre.
September 10, 2025	Mohammed Ahmed Mohammed Al-Zaakri	26 September Newspaper or Yemen newspaper	A newspaper complex, Sanaa	Killed by Israeli attacks. The deadliest massacre of journalists since the Maguindanao massacre.
September 10, 2025	Zuhair Ahmed Mohammed Al-Zaakri	26 September Newspaper or Yemen newspaper	A newspaper complex, Sanaa	Killed by Israeli attacks. The deadliest massacre of journalists since the Maguindanao massacre.
September 10, 2025	Mohammed Abdo Yahya Al-Sanfi	26 September Newspaper or Yemen newspaper	A newspaper complex, Sanaa	Killed by Israeli attacks. The deadliest massacre of journalists since the Maguindanao massacre.
September 10, 2025	Mohammed Al-Azzi Ghaleb Al-Harazi	26 September Newspaper or Yemen newspaper	A newspaper complex, Sanaa	Killed by Israeli attacks. The deadliest massacre of journalists since the Maguindanao massacre.
September 10, 2025	Issam Ahmed Murshid Al-Hashidi	26 September Newspaper or Yemen newspaper	A newspaper complex, Sanaa	Killed by Israeli attacks. The deadliest massacre of journalists since the Maguindanao massacre.
September 10, 2025	Salim Abdullah Abdo Ahmed Al-Wateeri	26 September Newspaper or Yemen newspaper	A newspaper complex, Sanaa	Killed by Israeli attacks. The deadliest massacre of journalists since the Maguindanao massacre.
September 10, 2025	Abbas Abdul Malik Muhammad Al-Dailami	26 September Newspaper or Yemen newspaper	A newspaper complex, Sanaa	Killed by Israeli attacks. The deadliest massacre of journalists since the Maguindanao massacre.
September 10, 2025	Lutfi Ahmed Nasser Hadiyan	26 September Newspaper or Yemen newspaper	A newspaper complex, Sanaa	Killed by Israeli attacks. The deadliest massacre of journalists since the Maguindanao massacre.
September 10, 2025	Qais Abdo Ahmed Al-Naqeeb	26 September Newspaper or Yemen newspaper	A newspaper complex, Sanaa	Killed by Israeli attacks. The deadliest massacre of journalists since the Maguindanao massacre.
September 10, 2025	Muhammad Ali Hamoud Al-Dawi	26 September Newspaper or Yemen newspaper	A newspaper complex, Sanaa	Killed by Israeli attacks. The deadliest massacre of journalists since the Maguindanao massacre.
September 10, 2025	Faris Abdo Ali Al-Rumaisa	26 September Newspaper or Yemen newspaper	A newspaper complex, Sanaa	Killed by Israeli attacks. The deadliest massacre of journalists since the Maguindanao massacre.
September 10, 2025	Abdul Rahman Mohammed Mohammed Jaman	26 September Newspaper or Yemen newspaper	A newspaper complex, Sanaa	Killed by Israeli attacks. The deadliest massacre of journalists since the Maguindanao massacre.
September 10, 2025	Amal Muhammad Ghaleb Al-Manakhi	26 September Newspaper or Yemen newspaper	A newspaper complex, Sanaa	Killed by Israeli attacks. The deadliest massacre of journalists since the Maguindanao massacre.
September 11, 2025	Abdullah Mahdi al-Bahri	Saba News Agency	Houthi-held parts of Yemen	Killed by an Israeli drone strike

== Journalists injured ==
Journalists injured in the Gaza war
Date	Name	Agency/Position	Location	Description
October 7, 2023	Ibrahim Qanan	Al Ghad TV	Khan Yunis	Injured by shrapnel during an Israeli attack
October 13, 2023	Thaer Al-Sudani	Reuters	Aalma ech Chaab, Lebanon	Injured in the same attack that killed Issam Abdallah
October 13, 2023	Maher Nazeh	Reuters	Aalma ech Chaab, Lebanon	Injured in the same attack that killed Issam Abdallah
October 13, 2023	Elie Brakhya	Al Jazeera	Aalma ech Chaab, Lebanon	Injured in the same attack that killed Issam Abdallah
October 13, 2023	Carmen Joukhadar	Al Jazeera	Aalma ech Chaab, Lebanon	Injured in the same attack that killed Issam Abdallah
October 13, 2023	Christina Assi	Agence France-Presse (photographer)	Aalma ech Chaab, Lebanon	Injured in the same attack that killed Issam Abdallah
October 13, 2023	Dylan Collins	Agence France-Presse (video journalist)	Aalma ech Chaab, Lebanon	Injured in the same attack that killed Issam Abdallah
November 13, 2023	Issam Mawassi	Al-Jazeera (videographer)	Yaroun, Lebanon	Israeli missile strike
December 15, 2023	Wael Al-Dahdouh	Al Jazeera (Gaza bureau chief)	Khan Yunis	Injured in an Israeli missile strike at a school that also killed cameraman Samer Abu Daqqa
December 15, 2023	Mustafa Alkharouf	Anadolu Agency (photojournalist)	East Jerusalem	Assaulted along with camera operator Faiz Abu Ramila by Israeli Border Police near Al-Aqsa Mosque
December 15, 2023	Faiz Abu Ramila	Anadolu Agency (camera operator)	East Jerusalem	Same attack as Mustafa Alkharouf
December 16, 2023	Mohammed Baalousha	Al-Mashahd TV (reporter)	North Gaza Governorate	Shot by an Israeli sniper while reporting
December 19, 2023	Islam Bader	Al-Aqsa TV (presenter)	Jabalia refugee camp	Airstrike
December 19, 2023	Mohamed Ahmed'	Shehab agency (reporter) and Al-Aqsa TV (photographer)	Jabalia refugee camp	Airstrike
December 23, 2023	Khader Marquez	Al-Manar (cameraman)	Al-Khardali river, Lebanon	Struck in the right eye by Israeli missile fragments following an airstrike
January 7, 2024	Ahmed al-Bursh		Nasr, Gaza City.	Injured by an Israeli attack.
January 7, 2024	Amer Abu Amr		Nasr, Gaza City.	Injured by an Israeli attack.
January 7, 2024	Hazem Rajab		Nasr, Gaza City.	Injured by an Israeli attack.
February 13, 2024	Ismail Abu Omar	Al Jazeera Arabic (correspondent)	Muraj, Rafah	Lost a leg following an Israeli drone strike
February 13, 2024	Ahmad Matar	Freelance cameraman	Rafah	Israeli drone strike
March 31, 2024	Hazem Mazeed	Al-Jazeera (photographer)	Al-Aqsa hospital, Deir al-Balah	Injured by an Israeli attack.
March 31, 2024	Ibrahim Labad	Al-Aqsa (photographer)	Al-Aqsa hospital, Deir al-Balah	Injured by an Israeli attack.
March 31, 2024	Nafez Abu Labda	Freelance photojournalist	Al-Aqsa hospital, Deir al-Balah	Injured by an Israeli attack.
March 31, 2024	Mohammed Abu Dahrouj	Zain Media (cameraman)	Al-Aqsa hospital, Deir al-Balah	Injured by an Israeli attack.
March 31, 2024	Naaman Shteiwi	Freelance photojournalist	Al-Aqsa hospital, Deir al-Balah	Injured by an Israeli attack.
March 31, 2024	Saeed Jars	Freelance photojournalist	Al-Aqsa hospital, Deir al-Balah	Injured by an Israeli attack.
March 31, 2024	Ali Hamad	Freelance photojournalist	Al-Aqsa hospital, Deir al-Balah	Injured by an Israeli attack.
March 31, 2024	Magdi Qaraqea	Freelance photojournalist	Al-Aqsa hospital, Deir al-Balah	Injured by an Israeli attack.
April 12, 2024	Sami Shehadeh	TRT	Nuseirat refugee camp	Injured by an Israeli attack
April 12, 2024	Sami Berhum	TRT Arabi (correspondent)	Nuseirat refugee camp	Injured by an Israeli attack
April 12, 2024	Unidentified third journalist		Nuseirat refugee camp	Injured by an Israeli attack
May 21, 2024	Amr Manasrah	Freelance photographer	Khalil Salman Hospital, Jenin	Hit by a bullet on the back
May 25, 2024	Nir Hasson	Haaretz	Old City, East Jerusalem	Attacked by young Israelis during the Jerusalem Day flag march
July 19, 2024	Unidentified journalist		Beita, Nablus	Injured during clashes by Israeli settlers
July 20, 2024	Mahmoud Ikee	Al Jazeera Arabic (cameraman)	Nuseirat refugee camp	Israeli airstrike
July 31, 2024	Ilana Curiel	Ynet	Sde Teiman detention camp	Physically and verbally abused by far-right Israeli anti-Arab rioters.
July 31, 2024	Ori Isaac	Channel 12	Sde Teiman detention camp	Physically and verbally abused by far-right Israeli anti-Arab rioters.
August 19, 2024	Salma Al-Qaddoumi		Hamad City	Shot in the back by Israeli forces
September 2, 2024	Mohammed Abu Zeid	Wafa Agency (photographer)	Ramallah	Assaulted, verbally abused and briefly detained by Israeli forces
September 4, 2024	Mohammed Mansour	Wafa Agency (photographer)	Kafr Dan, Jenin	Shot by Israeli forces
September 4, 2024	Raneen Sawafta	Wafa Agency (photographer)	Kafr Dan, Jenin	Shot by Israeli forces
September 4, 2024	Ayman Al-Nubani	Wafa Agency (photographer)	Kafr Dan, Jenin	Shot by Israeli forces
September 4, 2024	Yazan Hamayel	Freelance	Kafr Dan, Jenin	Shot by Israeli forces
September 24, 2024	Fadi Boudia	Miraya International Network (editor-in-chief)	Baalbek, Lebanon	Israeli missile strike
October 2, 2024	Ahmed al-Zard		Khan Yunis	Israeli missile strike which killed al-Zard's brother, uncle, and two cousins while injuring his mother and another brother
October 3, 2024	Robin Ramaekers	VTM (correspondent)	Beirut, Lebanon	Israeli airstrike
October 3, 2024	Stijn De Smet	VTM (cameraman)	Beirut, Lebanon	
October 8, 2024	Ali al-Attar	Al Jazeera (cameraman)	Al-Aqsa Martyrs' Hospital, Deir el-Balah	Injured by shrapnel during an Israeli airstrike
October 9, 2024	Fadi al-Wahidi	Al Jazeera (cameraman)	Northern Gaza	Shot in the neck by Israeli forces while covering the invasion of Jabalia refugee camp and slipped into a coma. As a result of paraplegia, he is paralyzed in both legs
October 11, 2024	Andrey X		West Bank, Palestine	Beaten up and detained by Israeli forces along with 4 other journalists
November 5, 2024	Rabie al-Munir	Al Araby TV (cameraman)	Qabatiya, Jenin	Shot and sustained injury in the abdomen by Israeli forces during an incursion
November 27, 2024	Abdelkader Bay	Video journalist	Khiam, Lebanon	Shot at by Israeli forces alongside another journalist right after the ceasefire began
November 27, 2024	Unidentified journalist	Associated Press	Khiam, Lebanon	Shot at by Israeli forces alongside another journalist right after the ceasefire began
November 27, 2024	Unidentified journalist	Sputnik	Khiam, Lebanon	Shot at by Israeli forces alongside another journalist right after the ceasefire began
January 12, 2025	Jarrah Khalaf	Quds Feed	Unidentified prison, West Bank	Lawyers for Justice said that he is being tortured in a Palestinian Authority jail for reporting on clashes in Jenin
January 14, 2025	Bashir Abu al-Shaar		Daraj, Gaza City	Israeli airstrike
January 26, 2025	Joel Maroun	Russia Today	Kfar Kila, Lebanon	Shot by Israeli forces
April 7, 2025	Hassan Aslih		Nasser Hospital, Khan Yunis	Israeli airstrike
April 7, 2025	Ihab al-Bardini		Nasser Hospital, Khan Yunis	Israeli airstrike
May 21, 2025	Mohammad Aliwi	Wafa Agency	Askar al-Qadeem refugee camp, Nablus	Suffered suffocation during an Israeli raid
May 27, 2025	Issam al-Rimawi	Anadolu Agency (photojournalist)	al-Mughayyir, Ramallah	Attacked by Israeli settlers
May 28, 2025	Osama Al-Arbid		As-Saftawi	Rescued after surviving an Israeli airstrike on his home that killed eight people and injured several others
June 5, 2025	Ahmed Qaljah	Al-Arabiya (freelance cameraman)	Al-Ahli Arab Hospital, Gaza City	Israeli airstrike
June 5, 2025	Unnamed journalist		Al-Ahli Arab Hospital, Gaza City	Israeli airstrike
June 5, 2025	Unnamed journalist		Al-Ahli Arab Hospital, Gaza City	Israeli airstrike
June 5, 2025	Unnamed journalist		Al-Ahli Arab Hospital, Gaza City	Israeli airstrike
June 30, 2025	Bayan Abu Sultan		Gaza City	Survived an Israeli airstrike that killed 33 other people, including journalist Ismail Abu Hatab
July 5, 2025	Unnamed correspondent	Deutsche Welle	Sinjil, Ramallah	Attacked by Israeli settlers while covering a planned protest against settler violence
July 5, 2025	Unnamed cameraman	Deutsche Welle	Sinjil, Ramallah	Attacked by Israeli settlers while covering a planned protest against settler violence
August 25, 2025	Hatem Khaled	Reuters	Nasser Hospital	Survived an Israeli attack that killed 20 other people, including 5 journalists
September 7, 2025	Mahmoud Abu Hamda		Gaza City	Injured by an Israeli bomb while reporting the targeting of the Al Ruya Tower
September 10, 2025	Mansour Al-Ansi		A newspaper complex in Sanaa, Yemen	Injured alongside an unknown number of journalists during Israel's September 2025 attacks
October 10, 2025	Arafat al-Khour	Abu Dhabi TV	Sabra, Gaza City	Injured by an Israeli airstrike while documenting damage in Sabra
October 10, 2025	Jaafar Ashtiyeh	Agence France-Presse (photographer)	Beita, Nablus	Attacked and injured by Israeli settlers while covering the Palestinian olive harvest
November 19, 2025	Fadi Yassin	Al Jazeera Arabic (cameraman)	Nur Shams, Tulkarm, West Bank	Shot and injured by Israeli forces while covering a protest by families displaced from the Nur Shams refugee camp
March 19, 2026	Steve Sweeney	Russia Today (reporter)	Qasmiyeh Bridge, north of Tyre, Lebanon	Injured after avoiding an Israeli strike targeted them while filming a report during the 2026 Lebanon war.
March 19, 2026	Ali Rida	Russia Today (cameraman)	Qasmiyeh Bridge, north of Tyre, Lebanon	Injured after avoiding an Israeli strike targeted them while filming a report during the 2026 Lebanon war.
March 31, 2026	Menahem Kahana	Haaretz (photojournalist)	West Jerusalem	Injured by an Israeli Police water cannon while reporting a protest against the "Death Penalty for Terrorists Law" bill.
April 22, 2026	Zeinab Faraj		At-Tiri, Lebanon	Injured by an Israeli airstrike that also killed her colleague, Amal Khalil.
August 5, 2026	Mohammed Somreen		Qalandia Camp	Injured and assaulted during a raid by Israeli forces.
September 6, 2026	Ali Shbib	Al-Manar (reporter)	Nabatieh, Lebanon	Injured by an Israeli airstrike.
September 6, 2026	Mohammad Barjaoui	Al-Manar (cameraman)	Nabatieh, Lebanon	Injured by an Israeli airstrike.
October 16, 2026	Heidi Levine	The Washington Post	Khirbet Abu Falah, West Bank	Attacked and injured by Israeli settlers.
November 17, 2026	Suleiman Abu Srour	Wafa (Photographer)	Ein ad-Duyuk at-Tahta, West Bank	Attacked and sustained injuries by Israeli soldiers while covering events in the town.

== See also ==
- Attacks on journalists during the Israel–Hezbollah conflict (2023–present)
- Casualties of the Gaza war
- History of Palestinian journalism
- List of journalists killed during the Israeli–Palestinian conflict
- Media coverage of the Gaza war
- Outline of the Gaza war
