= Communications in Palestine =

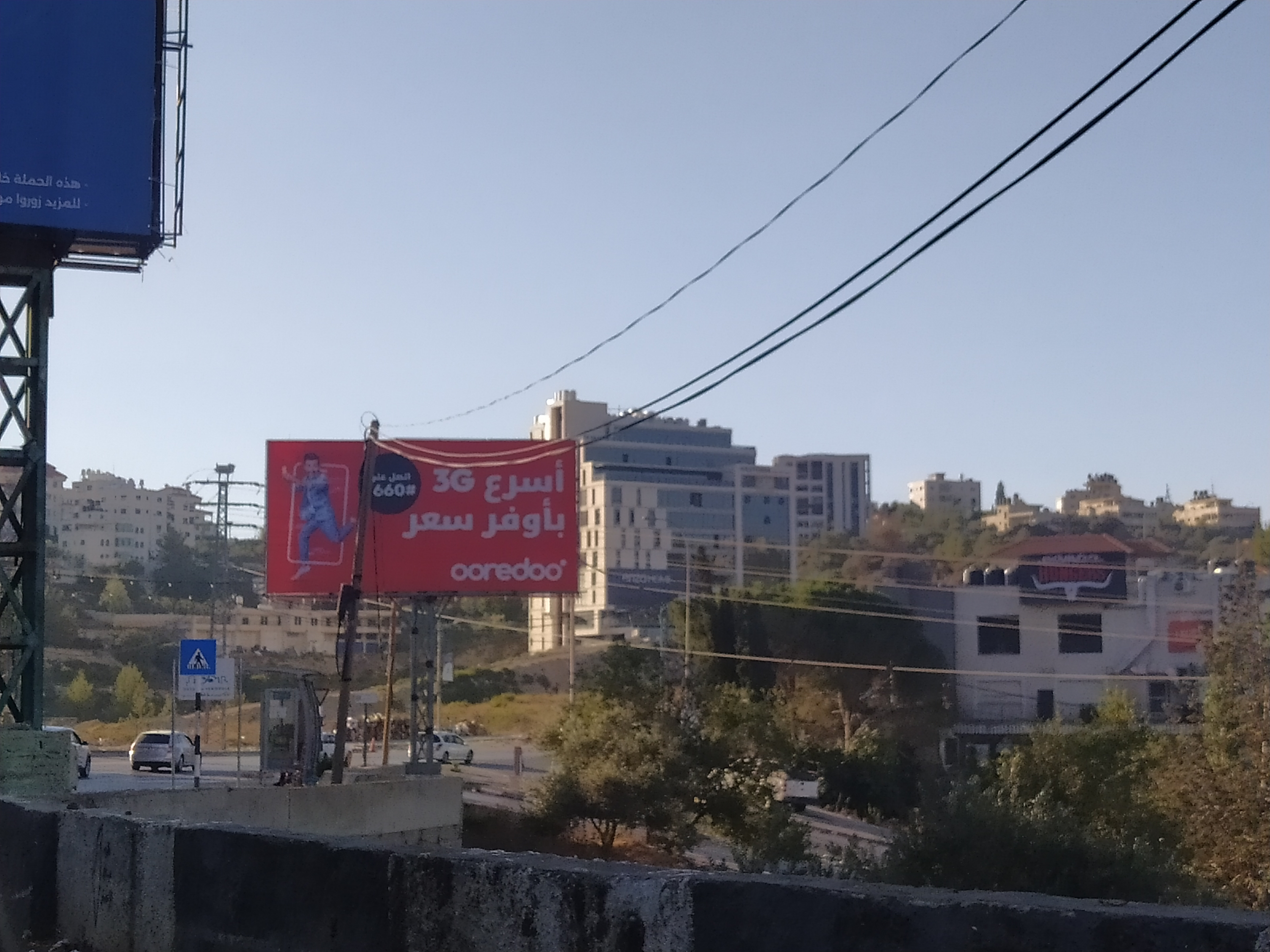
Ooredoo Palestine advertisement board in Surda

Palestine (consisting of the Gaza Strip and the West Bank) has access to telephone, radio, television, and Internet services; however, it significantly trails behind global standards in these sectors. The communications landscape in Palestine is hindered by several challenges, including restrictions from the Oslo Accords, which limit the use of spectrum frequencies for wireless communication without Israeli approval. Consequently, this has obstructed the introduction of modern technology into the Palestinian territories.

Through persistent negotiations, Palestine secured third-generation wireless communication frequencies, known as 3G, but this advancement is only available in the West Bank. In contrast, provision in Gaza remains constrained to 2G. The constraints imposed by the Oslo Accords are part of the broader framework governing the telecommunications industry in Palestine. Additional regulations, such as the Palestinian Telecommunications Law and various international agreements, further shape this sector.

On 6 January 2026, Israel authorised the enhancement of 4G mobile services for Palestinians in the West Bank.

The data illustrates how Palestine lags behind its neighboring countries, primarily due to the impacts of the Israeli occupation and the restrictions imposed on acquiring advanced technology from around the world. The control over Palestine's spectrum frequencies stifles its potential for growth in the communications sector.

== Telecommunications ==
=== Infrastructure and ISPs ===
- Country calling code: +970 or +972

The Palestinian telecommunications sector comprises a mix of public and private companies that provide fixed-line, mobile, and internet services. Three main companies dominate the sector:

- Paltel Group: Paltel Group, through its subsidiaries, offers fixed-line, internet, and mobile services. Paltel is the largest telecommunications company in Palestine and is heavily involved in infrastructure development, with over 400,000 landline customers.
- Jawwal: A subsidiary of Paltel, Jawwal is the leading mobile provider in Palestine. It provides mobile services for over 3 millions of Palestinians in the West Bank and Gaza Strip. However, due to frequency restrictions, Jawwal's service offerings have been limited compared to those of other Middle Eastern operators.
- Ooredoo Palestine (previously Wataniya Mobile) In addition to Paltel and Jawwal, entered the market in 2009 as the second mobile service provider. This competition introduced more options for consumers, with over 1.5 million customers, though both companies still face similar regulatory and frequency constraints.

Internet connectivity in Palestine is largely delivered through a combination of fixed-line and mobile networks. While broadband access is available, the Palestinian territories still experience lower average internet speeds compared to neighboring regions, largely due to the absence of advanced mobile networks and restrictions on equipment and frequencies.

=== Radio and television ===
TV and radio stations are run by two main entities, the Palestinian Broadcasting Corporation and Hamas. The PBC operates Voice of Palestine radio, Palestine TV, and Palestine Satellite Channel. While Hamas operates Al-Aqsa TV and Al-Aqsa Voice Radio, there are also dozens of other private broadcasters. Pan-Arab free-to-air TV is also popular, where users access channels such as Qatar's Al Jazeera channel.

On 1 October 1999, the International Telecommunication Union assigned Palestine the call block E4A through E4Z. Aircraft tail numbers, amateur radio stations, vessels at sea, and other radio facilities licensed by the Palestinian Authority will carry call signs beginning with "E4."

== Censorship ==
Digital technology in the Palestinian territories has expanded methods of government control. Repression now operates through surveillance, censorship, and harassment online. Digital tools enable faster and broader monitoring of communication, often serving as a precursor to arrests or other punitive actions. Similar to trends seen worldwide, digital repression in the Palestinian territories reflects a hybrid model in which online and offline controls are combined, contributing to self-censorship and restrictions on free expression.

In 2008, OpenNet stated, "Access to the Internet in the Palestinian territories remains relatively open, although social filtering of sexually explicit content has been implemented in Gaza. Internet in the West Bank remains almost entirely unfiltered, save for a single news Website that was banned for roughly six months starting in late 2008. Media freedom is constrained in Gaza and the West Bank by the political upheaval and internal conflict as well as by the Israeli forces."

On 23 April 2012, EFF published a list of websites censored by some Palestinian ISPs. That same day, the Tor Project announced that they were witnessing politically motivated censorship in Bethlehem.

In May 2012, the Ma'an news agency claimed, "The Palestinian Authority has quietly instructed Internet providers to block access to news websites whose reporting is critical of President Mahmoud Abbas."

== Mail ==
Palestine Post is responsible for providing postal service in the West Bank, while the Ministry of Telecommunications and Digital Technology is responsible for postal service in the Gaza Strip. Generally, international letters addressed to the West Bank are routed through both Jordan and Israel, and international letters addressed to Gaza are routed through only Israel. Delays often happen during the sending and receiving of letters from Palestine. Without these two national postal authorities, no international courier service would be serving the areas.

== Gaza war ==
During the Gaza war, telecommunications company Paltel kept its networks online for most of the first six weeks. The company has a network operations center in Ramallah, West Bank. As of 2023, Paltel has 750 staff in Gaza, and they perform maintenance tasks such as repairing and refueling generators when an outage is detected. Five Paltel staff have been killed in the conflict. Paltel networks are essential for coordinating emergency services and humanitarian aid, and for documenting conditions inside Gaza.

In response to previous wars in Gaza, Paltel has made preparations and has many contingencies to help keep its networks online. It buries its cables very deep (up to 26 feet) and has multiple power sources available, such as batteries, solar panels, and generators. Ultimately, Paltel is reliant on Israel, because its two main fiber optic cables pass through Israel. Israel has turned off telecommunications by interfering with these cables twice before.

On 3 November 2023, the BBC World Service launched an emergency radio service for Gaza, broadcasting on long-range AM from the British East Mediterranean Relay Station, to "provide listeners in Gaza with the latest information and developments as well as safety advice on where to access shelter, food and water supplies".

On 16 November 2023, due to fuel shortages, Internet and telephone services went down in Gaza. This also resulted in a suspension of humanitarian aid convoys because humanitarian agencies could not communicate. On 18 November, services were partially restored after some fuel was allowed in and allocated to telecommunications. On 21 November, an Israeli strike against a telecommunications tower in North Gaza led to a telecommunications blackout in that area.

An organization called Connecting Humanity provides internet access to people in Gaza using donated eSIMs, allowing them to connect to networks outside of Gaza. By December 2023 200,000 people living in Gaza (around 10% of the population) had received internet access through an eSIM.

As of August 2024, according to a Palestinian source, over 70% of telecommunications has been rendered inoperable. As of June 2025, Paltel is still providing some internet and landline telephone services in southern Gaza. There have been at least 10 outages since the conflict began. The lack of reliable telecommunications has hampered efforts by first responders and humanitarian groups.

== See also ==
- Blockade of the Gaza Strip
- Postage stamps and postal history of the Palestinian National Authority
- Israeli apartheid
- Occupied Palestinian territories
