= List of radio stations in Palestine =

This is a list of radio stations in Palestine.

== FM ==
- Palestinian Broadcasting Corporation
- Radio Alam
- Voice of Palestine

== See also ==
- Communications in Palestine
