= Ahmad Washah =

Palestinian journalist (2000–2026)

- احمد وشاح
- Born: Ahmad Samir Washah; 2000; Bureij, Deir al-Balah Governorate, Gaza Strip
- Died: 20 June 2026; Bureij
- Occupation: Journalist
- Employer: Al Jazeera
- Relatives: Mohammed Washah (brother)

Ahmad Samir Washah (Arabic: احمد سمير وشاح, romanized: Ahmad Samīr Wishāḥ, 2000 – 20 June 2026) was a Palestinian journalist working for Al Jazeera. He died during the Gaza war, after sustaining injuries from an Israeli airstrike on Bureij, a refugee camp in the Deir al-Balah Governorate. The Israel Defense Forces stated that Washah was a Hamas terrorist.

== Background ==
Ahmad Washah was born in the Al-Bureij refugee camp, the youngest of three brothers. He worked as a cameraman for Al Jazeera Mubasher, and gained prominence during the Gaza war by accompanying and filming footage for his late brother, Mohammed Washah, a Jazeera correspondent killed on April 8. After Mohammed's death, Ahmad took care of his children.

== Death ==
On 20 June 2026, the IDF conducted an airstrike on a house in Bureij, killing two other people as well. He was transported to Shuhada al-Aqsa Hospital in Deir al-Balah after the airstrike, where prayers were conducted as well as a funeral in his honor. He was buried in the camp's cemetery, next to his brother.

=== Response and tributes ===
The IDF confirmed that Washah was targeted in the airstrike, stating that he was a "a terrorist in Hamas' military wing who served as a sniper operative."

Al Jazeera Media Network demanded that the international community and legal institutions punish Israeli officials for crimes committed against its correspondents and staff in the Gaza Strip, and condemned the killings of Ahmad and his brother Mohammed. The network affirmed its intention to prosecute the perpetrators of the crimes, and rejected any claims of Ahmad being a member of Hamas' military wing.

Zohran Mamdani, mayor of New York City, described the killing of Ahmad Washah, along with other events that happened in Gaza, as ''immoral'' in a press conference.

== See also ==
- List of journalists killed during the Israeli–Palestinian conflict
- List of journalists killed in the Gaza war
