= Said Seyam =

Palestinian politician (1959–2009)

Minister of Interior of the Gaza Strip
- In office 15 June 2007 – 15 January 2009
- Prime Minister: Ismail Haniyeh
- Preceded by: Office established
- Succeeded by: Fathi Hamad

Minister of Interior
- In office 29 March 2006 – 17 March 2007
- Prime Minister: Ismail Haniyeh
- Preceded by: Nasser Yousef
- Succeeded by: Hani Talab al-Qawasmi

Member of the Palestinian Legislative Council
- In office 18 February 2006 – 15 January 2009
- Constituency: Gaza Governorate

Personal details
- Born: 22 July 1959 Al-Shati, Egyptian-administered Gaza Strip, Palestine
- Died: 15 January 2009 (aged 49) Jabalia, Palestine
- Cause of death: Israeli airstrike
- Party: Hamas
- Children: 6 (2 sons, 4 daughters)
- Education: Al-Quds Open University

Said Seyam (Arabic: سعيد صيام; 22 July 1959 – 15 January 2009), first name also spelled Saeed and Sayed and last name also spelled Siam, was a Palestinian politician. He served as the interior minister of the Palestinian government of March 2006. He joined Hamas and became one of its top commanders. During the 2008–2009 Gaza War, Seyam was killed in an Israeli airstrike in Jabalia. Seyam was the most senior Hamas member killed in the war, and the most senior Hamas figure killed by Israel since the death of Abdel Aziz al-Rantisi in April 2004.

== Early life and education ==
Said Seyam was born on 22 July 1959 in the Al-Shati refugee camp near Gaza City. His parents fled there during the 1948 Arab–Israeli War from their village home of al-Jura, near Ashkelon. Following his secondary education in Gaza City, he gained a diploma in sciences and maths, followed by a bachelor's degree in Islamic education from the Al-Quds Open University.

== Hamas membership ==
It is unknown when Seyam joined Hamas, but he was one of the earliest members. Seyam held a job as a teacher at various United Nations-run schools until 2003. He was arrested four times during the First Intifada from 1987 to 1991. In 1992, he was expelled from the Palestinian territories by Israel to southern Lebanon and upon his return in 1995, Seyam was arrested by the Preventive Security Service (PSS) dominated by Fatah.

Seyam was reported by Hamas as one of the pioneer of mortar and Qassam rocket attacks on Jewish settlements in the Gaza Strip, which caused them to be virtually besieged from 2001 to their evacuation by Israel in September 2005. According to his fighters, Seyam was injured three times during that period, although the causes of these injuries were not disclosed. Seyam was the second of Hamas' top five officials to be killed during Israel's offensive. He had evaded at least one attempt by the IDF to kill him in late 2004. Seyam became one of the members of the Hamas "collective leadership" in Gaza after the 2004 killings of founders Ahmed Yassin and Abdel Aziz al-Rantisi.

Seyam was close to Yassin and Hamas secretary-general Khaled Mashal, that latter whom he accompanied on a diplomatic visit to Moscow, Russia. After the parliamentary elections in 2006, Seyam was appointed Interior Minister of the Palestinian National Authority, forming the Palestinian government of March 2006. It also put him in charge of 13,000 police and security forces. He represented the Gaza electoral district of the Palestinian Legislative Council as a Hamas member after being elected with the most votes for any single candidate. In June 2007, he created the Executive Force, a paramilitary organization to rival Mohammed Dahlan's PSS. It played a key role in the takeover of Gaza and was praised by many Gazans for bringing order to Gaza, but accused of torture by others.

== Personal life ==
He had six children: two boys and four girls.

== Death ==
Said Seyam was killed on 15 January 2009 in an Israeli air raid on his brother's rented home in Jabalia. Also killed in the strike were his son, brother and two other Hamas officials: the interior ministry's security director Saleh Abu Sharkh and the local leader of the Hamas militia, Mahmoud Abu Watfah. Hamas spokesman Sami Abu Zuhri stated "Some of our leaders will fall, some of our people will fall, but the flag of resistance won't fall" in response to Seyam's death. Hamas members stated on Al-Aqsa TV that Seyam's "blood will be the fuel for the coming victory [against Israel]".

Political offices
Preceded by Nasser Yousef	Minister of Interior; 2006–2007	Succeeded by Hani Talab al-Qawasmi
New office	Minister of Interior of the Gaza Strip; 2007–2009	Succeeded by Fathi Hamad
