= Salwa Abu Libdeh =

Palestinian TV producer

Salwa Abu Libdeh (Arabic: سلوى أبو لبدة; born 1966) is a Palestinian TV producer and documentary filmmaker from Jerusalem.

== Early life and education ==
Salwa Abu Libdeh was born in Jerusalem in 1966. Her family is originally from Jaffa, but they moved to Jerusalem in 1948. She studied Arabic literature at Beirut Arab University through distance learning.

== Career ==
While in college, Abu Libdeh worked at a newspaper called Al Fajr. Her company collaborated with Deutsche Welle, and she received training in TV journalism from them. Later, she hosted local shows and radio programs for the Palestinian Broadcasting Corporation (PBC). She is a director at the PBC. Salwa Abu Libdeh has also worked with Qatar TV and Bahrain TV. She has created multiple documentaries on daily life for Palestinians and Israelis.

Abu Libdeh has also worked with UNESCO to produce the documentary On The Road to Dialogue in 2004.

Abu Libdeh took part in BBC 100 Women 2013. She has also worked with BBC Media Action, which collaborated with the PBC to create the program "Voices from Palestine" in 2012.

Salwa Abu Libdeh was married in 1987, and she has six children. She is a Muslim.
