= Mohammed Washah =

Palestinian journalist (1986–2026)

- محمد وشاح
- Born: Mohammed Samir Washah; 1986; Al-Bureij refugee camp
- Died: 8 April 2026 (aged 39–40); Gaza City
- Occupation: Journalist
- Years active: 2006–2026
- Employer(s): Al-Aqsa TV, TRT World, Al Jazeera
- Relatives: Ahmad Wishah (brother)

Mohammed Samir Washah (Arabic: محمد سمير وشاح, romanized: Muḥammad Samīr Wishāḥ, 1986 – 8 April 2026) was a Palestinian journalist working for Al Jazeera. He was assassinated during the Gaza war after an Israeli airstrike that targeted the vehicle he and another civilian were in, while they were driving on the Coastal road in Gaza city. The IDF has maintained that Washah was a Hamas combatant.

== Background ==
Born in 1986 in Al-Bureij refugee camp, Washah studied Medical Laboratory Analysis in university but decided to become a journalist in 2006, when he joined Al-Aqsa TV. Between 2010 and 2014, Washah was a journalist for TRT World. In 2018, Washah joined Al-Jazeera. In February 2024, the IDF's Arabic-language spokesman Avichay Adraee shared a tweet on his X account in which he said the army had found a laptop belonging to Wishah in the Gaza Strip containing documents that he claimed proved that Washah was a "senior commander in the anti-tank missile system within Hamas's military wing". Both Hamas and Al-Jazeera denied the claim.

== Family ==
Washah has a daughter called Sumayya, who has on occasions told news reporters that she wishes to pursue journalism as a career. He also has a brother called Ahmad Washah who also worked for Al-Jazeera, Ahmad was killed in an Israeli airstrike in June of 2026, the IDF confirmed that he was targeted, stating that he was a "a terrorist in Hamas' military wing who served as a sniper operative."

== Death ==
On 8 April 2026, an Israeli drone fired a missile at Washah's car, killing Washah and another person travelling with him instantly. Emergency crews rushed to the scene to extinguish the fire and recover the bodies. Washah was then carried to his hometown of Al-Bureij, where his funeral was held in one of the camp's mosques, attended by dozens of Palestinians. A day later, on 9 April 2026, the IDF said its forces had "struck and eliminated" Wishah, whom it described as “a key terrorist in Hamas' rocket and weapons production headquarters, who had been planning terrorist attacks against IDF soldiers operating in the area".

=== Response and tributes ===
Al-Jazeera Media Network strongly condemned the killing, calling the death "a deliberate and targeted crime".

Reporters Without Borders condemned the attack, saying that Wishah had joined “the list of more than 220 journalists killed in two and a half years by Israeli forces in Gaza, at least 70 of whom were killed while performing their duties".

The Committee to Protect Journalists called the attack a "part of a broader assault on press freedom" and called the international community for action.

== See also ==
- List of journalists killed during the Israeli–Palestinian conflict
- List of journalists killed in the Gaza war
