= Madinat Hamad =

Madinat Hamad may refer to:

- Hamad Town (Arabic: مدينة حمد, romanized: Madinat Hamad), a city in the Northern Governate of Bahrain
- Hamad City (Arabic: مدينة حمد السكنية, romanized: Madinat Hamad), a housing project in northwestern Khan Yunis, Gaza Strip
