= Al-Quds TV =

Defunct Hamas TV channel

- Country: Lebanon
- Broadcast area: Arab world Europe; Asia
- Headquarters: Lebanon; Ramallah, Palestine

Programming
- Language: Arabic

Ownership
- Owner: Hamas
- Sister channels: Al-Aqsa TV

History
- Launched: 11 November 2008
- Closed: 10 February 2019

Al-Quds TV (Arabic: قناة القدس) was a satellite television channel broadcast on Nilesat and Arabsat. It broadcast from 11 November 2008 to 10 February 2019.

The channel was affiliated with Hamas and maintained a pro-Hamas editorial position. Much of the channel's programming focused on statements and activities from Hamas and Islamic Jihad and criticism of Fatah and the Palestinian Authority.

On 18 November 2012, during Operation Pillar of Cloud, Israel bombed the Al-Quds TV station in Gaza, injuring three staff.

Israel designated Al-Quds TV as a terrorist organization in July 2018. Defense Minister Avigdor Lieberman accused the channel of serving as a "propaganda arm of Hamas".

On 10 February 2019, Al-Quds TV halted operations and closed its offices in Lebanon and the Gaza Strip due to financial issues. Salaries for its 150 employees had not been paid for months.
