= Iman al-Shanti =

Palestinian journalist (1988–2024)

- إيمان حاتم الشنطي
- Born: 1988
- Died: 11 December 2024 (aged 35–36); Gaza City, Gaza, Palestine
- Cause of death: Airstrike by the Israel Defence Forces
- Resting place: Sheikh Radwan Medical Centre
- Occupation: Journalist
- Years active: 2014–2024
- Employer(s): Al-Aqsa Voice Radio; AJ+
- Known for: Reporting on life in Gaza
- Spouse: Helmi
- Children: 4

Iman al-Shanti (Arabic: إيمان حاتم الشنطي, romanized: Īmān Ḥātim aš-Šanṭī; c. 1988–11 December 2024) was a Palestinian journalist working in Gaza. She worked for various outlets, including Al-Aqsa Voice Radio and Al Jazeera Arabic's online channel AJ+. On 11 November 2024, al-Shanti was killed, alongside her husband and three of her four children, in an Israeli airstrike on their home.

== Career ==
At the time of her death, al-Shanti had worked for a decade as a journalist reporting on and from Gaza. She hosted and produced the radio programme Asl al-Qisa (أصل القصة, 'Origin of the Story'), which covered social issues, women's rights, and the daily challenges of life in Gaza, and was broadcast on Al-Aqsa Voice Radio. Al-Shanti also contributed to AJ+, Al Jazeera Arabic's online-only news channel.

Following the outbreak of the Gaza war in October 2023, al-Shanti helped source medicine and water for people living in besieged northern Gaza. She used social media to document her family's life during the war, particularly X.

== Death ==
On 11 December 2024, the Israel Defence Forces carried out an airstrike on the Al-Malash apartment building in the Sheikh Radwan neighbourhood of Gaza City, where al-Shanti lived with her husband Helmi and their children Banan, Alma, Omar, and Bilal. The entire family was killed in the airstrike with the exception of Banan, who was seriously injured and required hospitalisation. Following al-Shanti's death, a post she wrote on X hours before her death, which read "is it possible we are still alive after all this? May God have mercy on the martyrs", went viral on social media.

Al-Shanti, her husband and their children were buried in a makeshift graveyard in the garden of Sheikh Radwan Health Centre.

== Response ==
The British newspaper The Guardian noted that al-Shamsi's fellow journalists, as well as media rights groups, believed that al-Shamsi had been deliberately targeted due to her journalism; it was reported that her apartment was the only one in the building damaged in the strike. The Guardian, the American news outlet ABC News, and the nonprofit organisation Committee to Project Journalists requested comments on al-Shamsi's death from the IDF, but did not receive an immediate response.

The Coalition for Women in Journalism stated that al-Shamsi was the 26th or 27th female Palestinian journalist killed following the outbreak of the war in October 2023. The Palestinian Media Forum reported that al-Shamsi was the 193rd Palestinian journalist overall to be killed in the war, and stated she had "given her life" for the Palestinian cause; it condemned "silence" from the international community as failing to protect journalists in Gaza. Tawakkol Karman of Women Journalists Without Chains called on perpetrators of violence against journalists in Gaza to be tried before the International Criminal Court.
