= Kabar (news agency) =

Official news agency of Kyrgyzstan

Кабар

Agency overview
- Jurisdiction: Government of Kyrgyzstan
- Headquarters: Bishkek
- Agency executives: Kubanichbek Tabaldiyev, Director General; Kuban Abdymen, Director
- Website: Kabar

Kabar, officially Kyrgyz National News Agency Kabar (Kyrgyz: Кыргыз Улуттук Маалымат Агенттиги «Кабар», romanized: Kyrgyz Uluttuk Maalymat Agenttigi "Kabar"; Russian: Кыргызское национальное информационное агентство «Кабар», romanized: Kyrgyzskoye natsionalnoye informatsionnoye agentstvo "Kabar"), is the official news agency of Kyrgyzstan and the oldest news agency in the country.

== History and profile ==
The agency was launched in 1937 under the name of KyrTAG. In 1992 it became a state-run news agency and was renamed to KyrgyzKabar. Three years later it was renamed to the Kyrgyz National Agency for Telecommunications and Information Administration Kabar. In 2001, it was renamed to the Kyrgyz National News Agency Kabar.

Kabar is headquartered in Bishkek. As of 2013, the director general of the agency is Kubanichbek Tabaldiyev. Kuban Abdymen was appointed director in February 2011, succeeding Jyrgalbek Turdukojoev. Kuban Abdymen was the director of the agency between 2000 and 2006.

The agency signed a cooperation agreement with Trend International News Agency of Azerbaijan on 8 November 2013.

A photographer working for Kabar named Mohammed Sobh was killed in an airstrike in Rimal district during the Gaza war.

Kabar is a member of the Organization of Asia-Pacific News Agencies (OANA).
