= Wafa Al-Udaini =

Palestinian journalist (1985-2024)

- Born: 1985
- Died: 29 September 2024 (aged 38–39)
- Cause of death: Airstrike
- Education: Al Aqsa University
- Occupation: Journalist
- Years active: 2008–2024
- Organization: 16 October Group
- Known for: Freelance journalism
- Spouse: Munir Atiyeh Al-Udaini
- Children: 4
- Website: 16october.com

Wafa Ali Al-Udaini (1985 – 29 September 2024) was a Palestinian freelance journalist. In 2024, she was killed in an airstrike at her home in Deir Al-Balah, Gaza Strip during the Gaza war.

== Biography ==
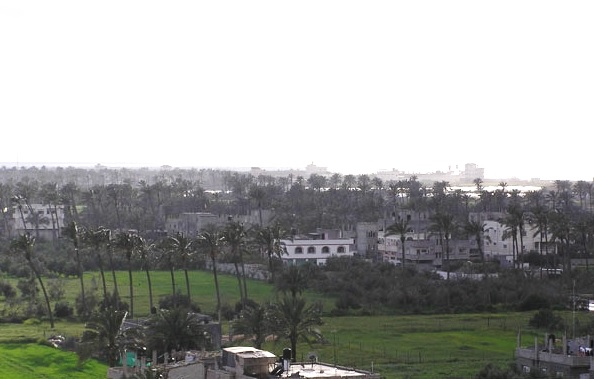
Deir al-Balah, Gaza Strip, pictured in 2008, when Al-Udaini first began reporting.

Wafa Al-Udaini was born in Deir Al- Balah in 1985. She attended Al Aqsa University where she majored in English, with the intention of becoming a teacher and translator.

=== Journalism career ===
After graduation, Al-Udaini started a career in journalism, reporting from Gaza first in 2008. In 2009, she started the media group 16 October, where she mentored young Gazan media professionals.

In 2018, Al-Udaini began reporting for the Palestine Chronicle. Al-Udaini reported on the conditions in Gaza and worked with several English-speaking news outlets, including The Guardian and Middle East Monitor.

In August 2024, Al-Udaini reported on the deaths of her journalist colleagues in Gaza, recounting how their press affiliations did not protect them from violence in Gaza.

=== Death ===
On 29 September 2024, Al-Udaini was killed alongside her husband and two of her children in an Israeli airstrike on her home in Deir Al-Balah. She became the 174th journalist to die reporting in Gaza since October 2023.

== See also ==
- List of journalists killed in the Gaza war
