= Yahya Barzaq =

Palestinian freelance photojournalist

- Born: Northern Cyprus
- Died: September 30, 2025 (aged 34–35); Gaza Strip, Palestine
- Cause of death: Israeli airstrikes
- Occupation: Freelance photojournalist
- Employer: TRT World
- Known for: Reporting during the Israel-Gaza conflict; killed while working

Yahya Barzaq (Arabic: يحيى برزق; died 30 September 2025), also known as Yahia Barzaq, was a Cypriot-Palestinian freelance photojournalist and newborn photographer from Gaza. He worked with TRT World among other outlets. Barzaq was killed in an Israeli airstrike in Deir al-Balah, central Gaza, while covering the impact of war on civilians.

== Life and work ==
Barzaq began his photography career doing newborn photography in Gaza City, capturing portraits of infants and family moments. Barzaq, along with his wife, established the Yahia Barzaq Newborn Studio in Gaza. Over time, especially after onset of escalated conflict, he shifted to photojournalism, documenting civilian life under bombardment, displacement, destruction, and the human cost of war. His work came to include images of airstrikes, destroyed infrastructure, and stories of survival. Barzaq was also of Turkish Cypriot descent through his grandmother, which allowed him to have Northern Cyprus citizenship.

He was known for having fled Gaza City due to safety concerns and displacement, yet continued to work, sharing his images on social media and for outlets including TRT. Barzaq also produced a documentary called Gaza Through My Lens with TRT.

Prior to his death, Barzaq contacted Cypriot news website, Bugun Kibris, to report about the situation in the Gaza Strip and expressed his frustration at Israel's orders to evacuate to southern Gaza.

== Death ==
On 30 September 2025, Barzaq was killed in an Israeli airstrike in Deir al-Balah, central Gaza. He was among several people killed in the strike, which reportedly hit a café and nearby carpentry workshop. Barzaq was in the area allegedly uploading footage, or had taken refuge there after leaving more heavily bombed areas. According to the Committee to Protect Journalists, the Israel Defense Forces sent an email through the North America Media Desk to the organization, stating that the attack targeted "a Hamas terrorist" and claimed that "the mentioned photographer was not the target of the strike."

TRT World, Qatar Press Center, and press-freedom organizations condemned the attack, highlighting the dangers faced by journalists in conflict zones and calling for accountability.

== See also ==
- Killing of journalists in the Gaza war
- List of journalists killed in the Gaza war
