= Hassan Aslih =

Palestinian journalist (died 2025)

- حسن صليح
- Born: c. 1990s Gaza Strip, Palestine
- Died: 13 May 2025; Khan Yunis, Gaza Strip, Palestine
- Occupations: Photojournalist, editor
- Known for: Coverage of Gaza conflict; director of Alam24 News; documenting October 7 events

Hassan Abdel Fattah Mohammed Aslih (Arabic: حسن عبد الفتاح محمد اصليح, romanized: Ḥasan Abd el-Fattāḥ Muḥammad Ṣulayyiḥ, pronounced: Ḥasan Eslāyeḥ (other spelling Hassan Eslayeh or Hassan Eslaiah); died 13 May 2025) was a Palestinian photojournalist, editor and director of Alam24 News Agency. He was killed by an Israeli airstrike on Nasser Hospital in Khan Yunis while recovering from injuries sustained in a previous attack on the same facility in April 2025. Aslih was widely recognized for his front line reporting of the Gaza war and his large social media presence documenting daily life during the Gaza war.

== Career ==
Aslih was a freelance photojournalist and editor, collaborating with both international and local news organizations, including CNN and the Associated Press. He led the Alam24 news outlet and was known for comprehensive coverage of the Israeli–Palestinian conflict, often reporting directly from the front lines and sharing real-time footage and photos on social media, where he had over a million followers. His content during the Gaza war often highlighted the humanitarian crisis, including the destruction of infrastructure and civilian casualties.

He gained international attention for sharing images and videos from the Hamas-led attack on Israel on 7 October 2023, some of which were published by major news agencies. Aslih’s work was widely used by global media, including Sky News, and The New York Times.

In September 2024, Aslih attempted to flee from Gaza to Egypt but was denied entry by Egypt.

On 7 April 2025, Aslih was severely injured by an IDF strike on a media tent near Nasser Hospital in southern Gaza. Aslih was then moved to the hospital's burn unit.

=== Controversy ===
The Israeli military accused Aslih of participating in the October 7 attacks and claimed the strike targeted a “Hamas command and control complex” at the hospital, though no specific evidence was provided and Palestinian officials denied any political affiliation. Human rights groups and press freedom organizations condemned the attack as part of a broader pattern of targeting journalists in Gaza. Israeli authorities alleged that Aslih was a Hamas operative, an accusation he and his colleagues denied. Gaza’s Government Media Office described the allegations as “untrue” and part of a strategy to justify attacks on journalists. In 2024, a photograph surfaced of former Hamas leader Yahya Sinwar kissing Aslih, leading some international news organizations to sever ties with him and remove his work from their archives.

== Death ==
On 13 May 2025, during the early morning hours, Aslih was killed in an Israeli airstrike that struck the surgical area of Nasser Hospital in Khan Yunis, where he had been hospitalised for nearly a month after being wounded in a previous strike on a media tent at the same hospital on 6 April. Gaza Civil Emergency Service member Ahmed Siyyam stated that the attack hit the third floor of the hospital building, where dozens of patients were being treated. Aslih's killing was condemned by the Committee to Protect Journalists and the International Federation of Journalists.

== See also ==
- Killing of journalists in the Gaza war
- List of journalists killed during the Israeli–Palestinian conflict
- List of journalists killed in the Gaza war
- 2025 Nasser Hospital strikes, which also killed journalists at the same spot
