= Fathi Hamad =

Palestinian politician (born 1961)

Fathi Ahmad Hamad
- فتحي أحمد حماد
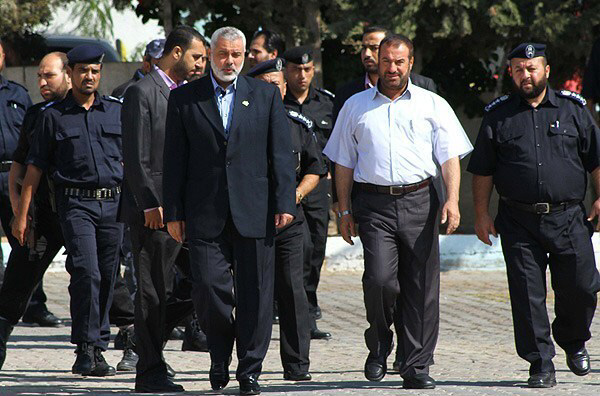
- Hamad (second from right, in white shirt) participates in Gaza police exercise in 2011

Minister of Interior of the Gaza Strip
- In office April 2009 – 2 June 2014
- Prime Minister: Ismail Haniyeh
- Preceded by: Said Seyam
- Succeeded by: Rami Hamdallah

Member of Hamas Political Bureau
- Incumbent
- Assumed office 2012

Member of the Palestinian Legislative Council
- Incumbent
- Assumed office 18 February 2006

Personal details
- Born: 3 January 1961 (age 65) Beit Lahia, Egyptian-administered Gaza Strip, Palestine
- Party: Hamas
- Children: 24
- Education: Qalandia Institute (1982); Al-Quds Open University (2006); Islamic University of Gaza (2012); Omdurman University (2020)

Fathi Ahmad Hamad (Arabic: فتحي أحمد حماد, also spelled Fathi Hammad; born 3 January 1961) is a Palestinian politician and member of the Hamas political bureau. He was Interior Minister in the Hamas-administered Gaza Strip from 2009 to 2014.

== Biography ==
In 1983, Hammad joined the Muslim Brotherhood. He is the founder and Vice President of Dar Al Quran.

From 1988 to 1994, Hamad was in Israeli prison. He was also arrested three times by the Palestinian Authority and spent 2 years in Palestinian jails.

Hamad became a Hamas-affiliated member of the Palestinian Legislative Council in 2006, representing his home town of Beit Lahia in North Gaza Governorate. He also leads the Hamas Public Affairs Department and the chairman of al-Ribat Communications and Artistic Productions - a Hamas-run company which produces Hamas's radio station, Al-Aqsa Voice Radio, its television station, Al-Aqsa TV and its bi-weekly newspaper, The Message. Under his direction, the station broadcast children's show Tomorrow's Pioneers, which received heavy criticism for its antisemitic and Islamist content. Hamad defended the contents of the show, stating "it does not violate any moral or professional standard."

In April 2009, Hamad was appointed Interior Minister in the Hamas-administered Gaza Strip, replacing Said Seyam who had been assassinated by Israel during the 2008–2009 Gaza War. He ceased being Interior Minister in June 2014 on the formation of the Fatah–Hamas unity government. According to the United States, Hamad used his position as interior minister to "coordinate terrorist cells."

In November 2009, Waad, a Gaza charity headed by Hamad, offered a $1.4 million bounty to any Arab citizen of Israel who abducts an Israeli soldier. While Palestinian militant groups have frequently called on Arab-Israelis to capture soldiers, this marked the first time money had been offered.

In September 2016, the U.S. Department of State named Hamad a Specially Designated Terrorist, outlawing U.S. citizens and companies from doing business with him and freezing his assets in areas under U.S. jurisdiction. The designation named Hamad as the founder and director of Hamad's Al-Aqsa TV, which the U.S. said aired "programs designed to recruit children to become Hamas armed fighters and suicide bombers." In response, Hamad told the Washington Post that he "was proud that I managed to anger America."

He provides funding and military instruction to the West Bank branch of Hamas, founded by prisoners released in the 2011 Gilad Shalit prisoner exchange. According to Palestinian officials, Hamad was behind a cell planning suicide bombings and other attacks in Abu Dis.

Hamad arranged for Yahya Sinwar's widow to be remarried in Turkey, and was believed to be smuggling Hamas members and their families out of Gaza during the 2023 Gaza War, arranging for fake passports, fictitious medical records, and assistance from the embassies of sympathetic countries.

In September 2025, Hamad narrowly escaped an Israeli assassination attempt that killed 5 other Hamas members in Doha, Qatar.

== Personal life ==
According to Hamas' website, Hamad has 24 children. Some sources claim that Yaqeen Khader Fathi Hamad, who was killed in 2025, was his daughter.

== Views ==
Hamad is viewed in Gaza as a powerful, but extreme, loose cannon, who operates independently of and kept at arm's length by Hamas. He is well-known as one of the most radical figures in Hamas. Hamad was a central figure opposing reconciliation with the Fatah-dominated Palestinian Authority.

A speech made by Hamad, broadcast on Al-Aqsa TV in February 2008, has been used as evidence by Israel and others that Hamas and other Palestinian militant groups make use of human shields. In an interview which aired on Al-Aqsa TV on 14 December 2010 (as translated by MEMRI), Hamad stated that "the Jews have become abhorred and loathed outcasts because they live off corruption and the plundering of the peoples."

In 2011, Hamad predicted Israel's destruction in 12 years, saying "we are working toward that goal day and night."

In a speech broadcast on Egyptian Al-Helma TV on 23 March 2012, Hamad condemned Egypt over the fuel shortage in the Gaza Strip, and stated, "Half of the Palestinians are Egyptians and the other half are Saudis."

In late July 2018, Hamad called on Muslims to kill Zionist Jews in a funeral speech at the Great Omari Mosque in Gaza City: "O Muslims, wherever you find a Zionist Jew, you must kill him because that is an expression of your solidarity with the al-Aqsa Mosque and an expression of your solidarity with your Jerusalem, your Palestine and your people,"

In March 2018, Hamad, as a senior Hamas official, was reported to oppose reconciliation with Fatah, and urged a resumption of war against Israel. He was implicated in the assassination attempt on Prime Minister Rami Hamdallah.

== Controversies ==
In July 2019, Hamad urged members of the Palestinian diaspora to kill Jews in Palestine and also across the globe. His comments were characterized as incitement to genocide by Committee for Accuracy in Middle East Reporting in America and the Simon Wiesenthal Center. His rhetoric was condemned by other Palestinians. The deliberate killing of civilians is said by mainstream Islamic scholars to be prohibited in Islamic law.

Political offices
Preceded by Said Seyam	Minister of Interior of the Gaza Strip; 2009–2014	Succeeded by Rami Hamdallah
