= Hani Talab al-Qawasmi =

Palestinian politician

- هاني طلب القواسمي

Minister of Interior
- In office 17 March 2007 – 23 April 2007
- President: Mahmoud Abbas
- Prime Minister: Ismail Haniyeh
- Preceded by: Said Seyam
- Succeeded by: Ismail Haniyeh

Personal details
- Born: 1958 (age 67–68) Gaza City, All-Palestine Protectorate
- Party: Independent
- Children: 5
- Education: Cairo University
- Occupation: Politician, law professor

Hani Talab al-Qawasmi (Arabic: هاني طلب القواسمي; born 1958) is a Palestinian politician and law professor. He was born in 1958 in Gaza City, although his family originated from Hebron in the modern-day West Bank and emigrated to the Gaza Strip in 1949. Al-Qawasmi received his BA degree in accounting from Cairo University and pursued his studies and got a high diploma in human resources from Cairo University. Al-Qawasmi worked at the religious al-Azhar Institute for 10 years. He worked with the establishment of the Palestinian National Authority in its Civil Affairs Ministry for 7 years.

He worked as general director of administrative affairs at the Interior Ministry, effectively the Interior Minister of the Palestinian National Authority, upon a decision from the Cabinet.

In May 2007, the coalition deal between Hamas and Fatah appeared to be weaker, as new fighting broke out between the two factions. This was considered a major setback. Al-Qawasmi, who had been considered a moderate civil servant acceptable to both factions, resigned due to what he termed harmful behavior by both factions.

Al-Qawasmi is currently married with five children.

== See also ==
- History of the Israeli–Palestinian conflict

Political offices
Preceded by Said Seyam	Minister of Interior; 2007	Succeeded by Ismail Haniyeh
