= Palestinian Satellite Channel =

Television channel in Palestine

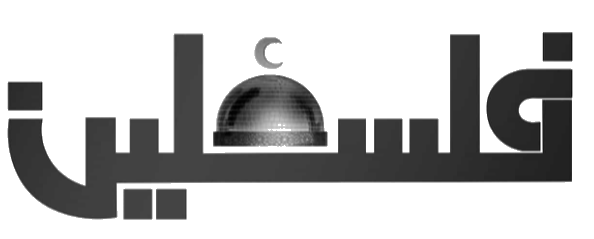
- Country: Palestine
- Headquarters: Ramallah, Palestine

Programming
- Language: Arabic
- Picture format: 576i (4:3 SDTV)

History
- Launched: 18 January 1999; 27 years ago

Links
- Website: www.pbc.ps

Availability

Streaming media
- pbc.ps: Watch live

Palestine Satellite Channel, widely and formally known as Palestine TV or Palestinian Authority TV and its companion radio station, Voice of Palestine (launched 1995), are free-to-air (FTA) general entertainment channels in Arabic. The satellite channel is part of the Palestinian Broadcasting Corporation, which began broadcasting from the Gaza Strip immediately after the government took power under the Oslo Accords in 1994.

== History ==
A test card of the Palestinian Satellite Channel appeared on the Nilesat 101 satellite on the morning of 21 December 1998. That afternoon, it held its first test transmission while linking up to the PBC Gaza station for Tarawih prayers. Voice of Palestine reported that the station would remain in test transmissions for the next two months. The channel opened on 18 January 1999; work on the building that would house PBC and PSC would be finished by 1 April.
