= Ismail Abu Hatab =

Palestinian journalist (1993–2025)

- إسماعيل أبو حطب
- Born: 1993; Gaza City, Gaza
- Died: 30 June 2025 (aged 32); Gaza City, Gaza
- Cause of death: Assassination by airstrike
- Education: University College of Applied Sciences (UCAS)
- Occupations: Photojournalism; filmmaking
- Organizations: BBC; DW; CARE International; C-light

Ismail Abu Hatab (Arabic: إسماعيل أبو حطب; 1993 – 30 June 2025) was a Palestinian photojournalist and filmmaker, creator of C-light and ByPa, a Palestinian creative collective. He was best known for his frontline coverage of the Gaza war. He organized several photography exhibitions outside the Gaza Strip. He was killed by an Israeli airstrike on 30 June 2025.

== Life and career ==
Abu Hatab was born and raised in Gaza City. In the early 2000s, he began photographing daily life and conflict scenes, and by 2008, he was freelancing for local outlets.

From 2008, Abu Hatab started working with International organizations and news agencies, such as BBC, DW, and CARE International.

On 2 November 2023, While covering Israeli airstrikes from the al-Ghafari Tower, Abu Hatab was seriously injured. Abu Hatab told NDTV that freelance journalists in Gaza "have no institutional safety net".

In April 2025, Abu Hatab's exhibition "Between Sky and Sea", was screened at Los Angeles, United States.

=== Death ===
On 30 June 2025, an Israeli airstrike hit the al-Baqa internet cafeteria in Gaza City, killing him and at least 41 others. He was 32.

The Palestinian Media Forum mourned Abu Hatab's death. The International Federation of Journalists (IFJ) and the Palestinian Journalists Syndicate (PJS) condemned the attack and called for an immediate investigation.
