= Al-Baqa Café airstrike =

2025 attack in the Gaza war

- Part of the Gaza war
- Location: Gaza Port, Gaza Strip
- Date: 30 June 2025
- Attack type: Airstrike
- Weapon: Mark 82 bomb
- Deaths: 41+
- Injuries: 75+
- Perpetrator: Israel Defense Forces

On 30 June 2025, the Israel Defense Forces (IDF) conducted an airstrike on the al-Baqa internet café near the port of Gaza City, within the Gaza Strip. The attack killed at least 41 people—including photojournalist Ismail Abu Hatab—and injured another 75. Reportedly, most of the casualties were women and children.

The café had become a gathering place for young people, including students, journalists, and artists. According to eyewitnesses, some of the visitors were working remotely or attending a child's birthday party at the time of the strike.

== Background ==
The al-Baqa Café had been operating for nearly 40 years and served as a recreation spot for young people in the Gaza Strip. As a result of the Gaza war, the café had consisted of several tents along the beach, sheltering Palestinian refugees. The area al-Baqa Café is located was not covered by any of the Israel Defense Forces (IDF) evacuation orders.

== Airstrike ==
The IDF had used a warplane to drop a 500-pound Mark 82 bomb on the crowded beachfront cafeteria, leaving a large crater and killing at least 41 Palestinians. The IDF did not issue any warnings or evacuation orders before conducting the strike. According to an Israeli outlet, the target of the strike was Hasham Mansour, the son of a Hamas military commander who was killed months prior.

A few days later, the IDF claimed to have killed Ramzi Ramadan Abd Ali Saleh, Nissim Muhammad Suleiman Abu Sabha, and Hisham Ayman Atiya Mansour—deputy head of Hamas's mortar unit.

== Victims ==
Among the dead was Ismail Abu Hatab, a filmmaker and photojournalist who had previously been injured in a 2023 airstrike. He was the founder of ByPa, a Palestinian creative collective. Another journalist, Omar Zaino, also died in the attack, while journalist Bayan Abu Sultan was reported injured. Visual artist, Frans al-Salmi, was also killed in the attack.

The airstrike also killed two athletes, according to the Palestinian Olympic Committee: footballer Mustafa Abu Amireh and boxer Malak Musleh. Musleh was one of Gaza's youngest female boxers and had aspirations of representing Palestine at international tournaments.

Other victims included remote IT workers Nasim Sabha and Mohammed Abu Odeh, as well as several members of the Mansour family, including the son of Ayman Mansour, a Hamas commander killed in 2023. It is unclear whether these family members had ties to Hamas. The Israeli military stated that the target was Hamas operatives and claimed it had attempted to minimize civilian casualties through aerial surveillance prior to the strike.

== Reactions ==
The IDF said the situation is under review and claimed it had "struck several Hamas terrorists" and that "prior to the strike, steps were taken to mitigate the risk of harming civilians using aerial surveillance".

Hamas condemned the airstrike, stating: "An airstrike carried out by the criminal occupation army's aircraft targeted innocent civilians gathered at a rest stop on the Gaza City beach".

Gerry Simpson of Human Rights Watch (HRW) said that the IDF: "hasn’t said exactly whom it was targeting", but that it had used aerial surveillance to minimize civilian casualties, meaning: "it knew the café was teeming with customers at the time", calling it an: "unlawful disproportionate or indiscriminate attack" which should be investigated as a war crime.

== See also ==
- Outline of the Gaza war
- Timeline of the Israeli–Palestinian conflict in 2025
- Timeline of the Gaza war (16 May 2025 – 19 August 2025)
- Gaza genocide
- Israeli war crimes
  - Israeli war crimes in the Gaza war
