= Hamad City =

Apartment complex in Khan Yunis, Gaza Strip

Hamad City مدينة حمد السكنية
- Neighbourhood of Khan Yunis
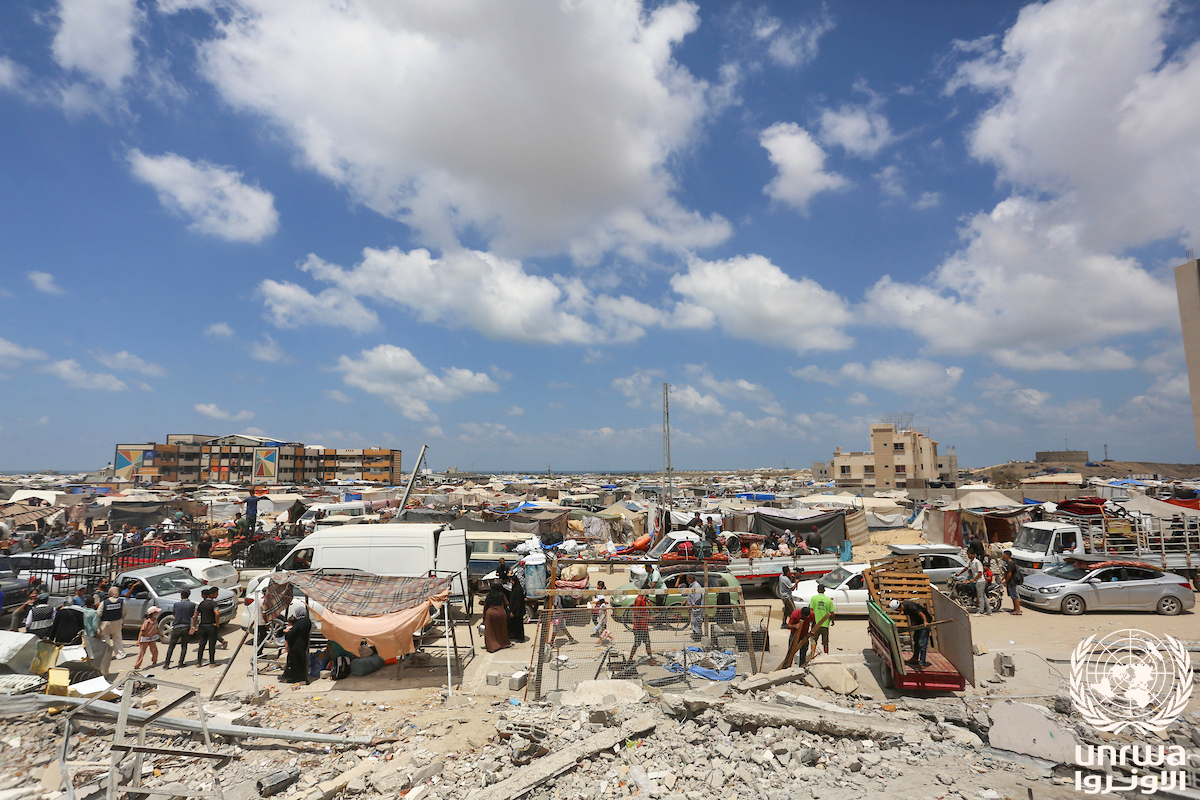
- Hamad in August 2024 during evacuations
- Nickname: Hamad
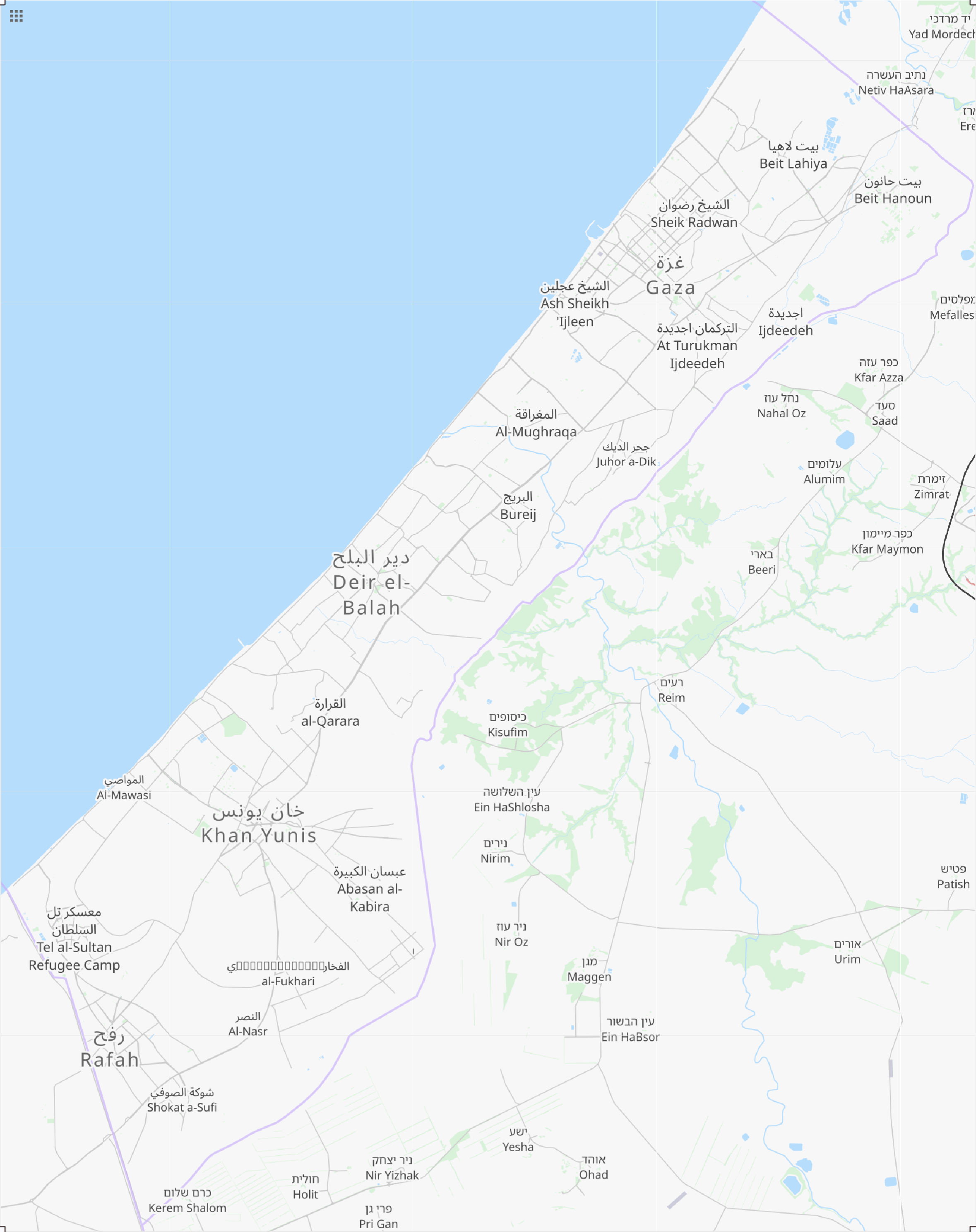
- Location within Gaza Strip Location within State of Palestine
- Coordinates: 31°22′33″N 34°19′03″E
- Palestine grid: 83/83
- Country: Palestine
- Governorate: Khan Yunis Governorate
- City: Khan Yunis
- Opened: 2016
- Founder: Hamad bin Khalifa Al Thani

Government
  - Body: Ministry of Public Work and Housing

Area
  - Total: 0.126 km^{2} (0.049 sq mi)
- Demonym: Palestinians
- Time zone: UTC+2 (EET)
  - Summer (DST): +3

Hamad City or Hamad Town (Arabic: مدينة حمد السكنية, romanized: Madinat Hamad; lit. 'Hamad Residential City') is an apartment complex and neighbourhood in northwestern Khan Yunis, Gaza Strip, Palestine. Named after its benefactor, Hamad bin Khalifa Al Thani of Qatar, the complex was envisioned as a housing solution for middle to lower-income Palestinian families.

In 2024, Hamad City was the scene of a battle in the Gaza war. Many buildings in the complex were destroyed as a result of the war.

== Background ==
One of the outcomes of the Gaza Strip's long conflict with Israel was a perennial housing crisis. As a result of the 1948 Palestine war, many of the 700,000 Palestinians who fled or were forcibly expelled from their homes arrived in the Gaza Strip as refugees. After Hamas's rise to power in 2007, an Israeli-imposed blockade of the Gaza Strip severely limited the importation of building materials. Military operations in 2009 and 2012 rendered 70,000 housing units uninhabitable. In addition to these challenges, the United Nations found that population density in 2020 was 5,800 per square kilometre (15,000 per square mile), with an annual birth rate of 60,000. As the largest scale Gaza Strip housing project conceived in the aftermath of these conflicts, Hamad City was partly successful in addressing this housing shortage while adding thousands of jobs to the local economy. However, it ultimately failed in its primary mission of providing truly affordable housing for the forlorn population of the Gaza Strip.

== History ==
The area of the complex was the location of the former Israeli settlements of Katif and Netzer Hazani. The settlements were abandoned in 2005, along with the entire Gush Katif settlement bloc, as a result of Israel's disengagement from Gaza. The land subsequently fell under the administration of the Palestinian Authority.

The initiative to create Hamad City came as a direct result of the visit of Hamad bin Khalifa Al Thani, Emir of Qatar, to the Gaza Strip in 2012. The visit, the first by a head of state to the Gaza Strip since Hamas fighters seized control in 2007, was condemned by Israel as seemingly granting legitimacy to a terror organisation. The Qatari government and Gaza's Ministry of Public Work and Housing (MPWH) took joint responsibility in managing the project, with the Qatari Committee for the Reconstruction of Gaza being formed at this time. Al Thani, who envisioned the project as a housing solution for middle to lower-income Palestinians, laid the foundation stone for the complex and provided $150 million to fund its construction. His idea was to sell the apartments at cost, while also providing an easy payment plan. Ninety percent of the construction plans were repurposed from a similar project in Gaza City. Construction materials were almost impossible to import due to the blockade of the Gaza Strip, so the Qataris sought to bring these in through the border with Egypt. By 2013 however, a change in Egypt's leadership led to severe restrictions at the Rafah Border Crossing and a crackdown on the smuggling tunnels used to import materials into Gaza, slowing down construction considerably. Hamad City was inaugurated in 2016, with the first thousand units being allocated to families who lost their homes as a result of the 2014 Gaza War. (Note: It is estimated that some 200,000 housing units were totally or partially destroyed as a result of the 2014 Gaza War alone; in a study concluded in January 2015, MPWH determined that 11,000 housing units in the Gaza Strip had been completely destroyed, 6,800 suffered severe damage, 5,700 had major damage, and 147,000 had minor damage; of those, 17,800 were classified as uninhabitable.) After delays involving a land dispute with a local Bedouin tribe, in February 2017 Ismail Haniyeh—then vice chairman of the Hamas Political Bureau—delivered a speech at the dedication ceremony of the second phase of the project, during which he announced the addition of 1,060 apartments. A third phase, which was to encompass 800,120 square metres (0.30893 mi^{2}) and include playgrounds and car parks, was in the planning stages. Three main roads adjacent to the complex were repaired and developed.

While the complex generally attracted a younger demographic which was not inclined to resistance activity, Maariv claimed that Hamas operatives and officials were known to have domiciled there. On 10 May 2023—the second day of Operation Shield and Arrow—the Israeli Air Force (IAF) struck an apartment in the complex belonging to the sister of Palestinian Islamic Jihad's rocket division head, killing him and two of PIJ's commanders.

=== Israel–Gaza war ===
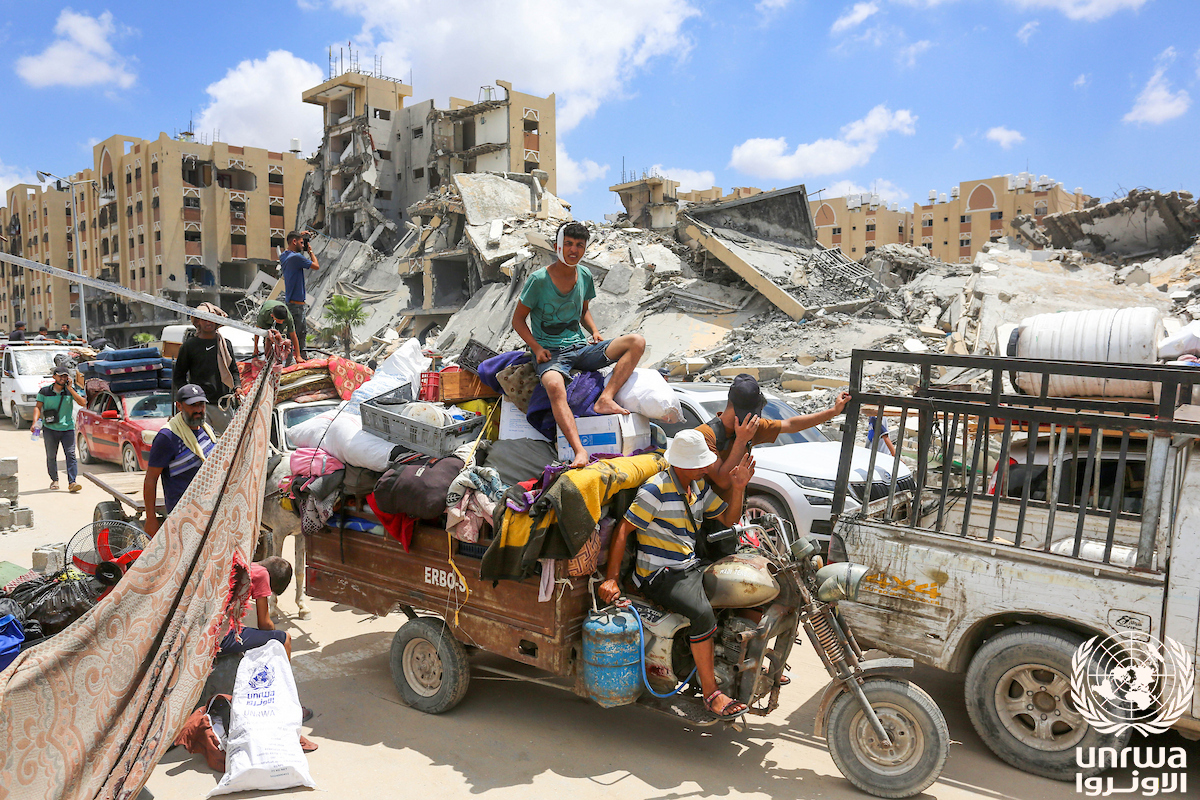
People evacuating from Hamad in August 2024

On 2 December 2023, after a week-long cessation of fighting in the Gaza war, the Israel Defense Forces (IDF) began bombing targets in Khan Yunis, including in Hamad City. The IAF conducted five airstrikes in the complex within a space of two minutes. Bombs hit one building after another, largely destroying them. Residents were warned to leave the area via leaflets before the strikes commenced.

On 3 March 2024, after conducting a series of attacks on nearby Deir al-Balah, the IDF began to lay siege to Hamad City. By this time, the neighbourhood was serving as a shelter for additional thousands of refugees who had been displaced as a result of IDF operations in northern Gaza. The IDF set up a checkpoint in the neighbourhood and directed residents to evacuate to Al-Mawasi or Deir al-Balah. A total of fifty targets in the district and in neighbouring al-Qarara were hit by airstrikes and artillery within the space of six minutes. During the eleven days of fighting which ensued, specialised Egoz, Maglan, Shayetet 13 and Givati reconnaissance units methodically went through what remained of every building in the complex, clearing them floor by floor. In one of the buildings, soldiers found Colonel Yonatan Steinberg's army-issued weapon, along with personal effects of Israelis who were abducted at the outset of the war. IDF commanders who engaged elite Nukhba fighters in the neighbourhood declared that it was the toughest battle zone of the war. Hamad City was turned into ruins as a result of IDF operations there. A resident of the complex who returned there in April in order to move back into her severely-damaged home explained that "it is better than tents ... We don't have a city any more, only rubble. There is absolutely nothing left ... There were no walls or windows. Most of the towers were completely blown up."

On 11 August 2024, Israel ordered the evacuation of Khan Younis, including Hamad City, as they considered it a combat zone. It was one of the largest evacuation orders issued during the war to that point.

== Description ==
Hamad City is situated in the northwestern part of Khan Yunis, adjacent to Deir al-Balah. It consisted of three thousand apartments divided among fifty-three sand-coloured apartment blocks. Each building consisted of a ground floor and five-storeys above it, with four apartments on each floor. The apartments came in three sizes: 100 square metres (1,100 ft^{2}), 115 square metres (1,240 ft^{2}) and 130 square metres (1,400 ft^{2}). While the complex featured its own schools, a mosque, shops and a garden area, some residents noted the lack of a health clinic, food market and police station. Other complainants referred to sub-standard electrical systems and bad quality doors and floor tiles, as well as sewage backups. Some residents reported being unfamiliar with such modern amenities as cooktops and washing machines.

=== Eligibility requirements ===
Although the complex was initially intended as a housing solution for middle to lower-income Palestinian families affected by homelessness, assertions were made over time that applicants who demonstrated an ability to make house payments were given preferential access by the MPWH. The complex, which has been described as "luxurious" "prestigious" and "affluent", only had fifty of its units allocated to the truly destitute. The MPWH required an applicant to pay an initial $10, and then be able to make a $1,000 down payment, along with a $170 monthly installment. A personal interview and background check was required, with one guarantor required for a government employee and two for self-employed applicants. The average cost of an apartment was $40,000 with payments required to be made through the Hamas-controlled Commercial Bank or Islamic National Bank. A cash payment in full would lower the cost to $32,000. Preference seems to have been given to party activists and government officials. Professional groups such as teachers, engineers and their family and friends seemed to coalesce around specific buildings. One religious resident succeeded in coercing his less observant neighbours to remove concrete benches from the garden area because he was interested in promoting gender segregation amongst the complex's youth. While the initial expectation that apartments should be granted outright to families whose homes were destroyed never materialised, after the political and economic situation worsened the MPWH did agree to lower the monthly payment to $130, and deferred payments for two years.

== Sources ==
- Elkahlout, Ghassan (2020). "Post-conflict Housing Reconstruction In the Gaza Strip: A Case Study of Agency-driven Housing in Sheikh Hamad City". International Journal of Housing Markets and Analysis. 13 (2). Bingley: 317–330. doi:10.1108/IJHMA-03-2019-0034. ProQuest 2534214806.
