= Voice of Palestine =

Radio station of the Palestinian Authority

The Voice of Palestine (Arabic: صوت فلسطين, romanized: Ṣawt Filasṭīn) is the official radio broadcaster of the Palestinian Authority, based in Ramallah, Palestine. It is a subsidiary of the Palestinian Broadcasting Corporation, under the control of the Palestinian Authority. The station was originally known as the Voice of Palestinian Revolution (صوت الثورة الفلسطينية Ṣawt aṮ-ṯawra l-Filasṭīniyya) before the 1993 Oslo Accords, and was launched on 17 October 1998.

On 12 October 2000 – shortly after the outbreak of the Second Intifada – successive Israeli Air Force raids stopped transmission of the Voice of Palestine, destroying the technical equipment used for transmission. As of 2008 the radio service broadcast on shortwave (AM).

The Voice of Palestine broadcasting centre was destroyed by Israel in January 2002. Anne Applebaum wrote that "the Voice of Palestine will remain what it has become: a combatant—and therefore a legitimate target—in a painful, never-ending, low-intensity war".

On 20 March 2023, Israeli authorities ordered Voice of Palestine to be banned from operating within Israel. Israel closed the Voice of Palestine's office in East Jerusalem, which is considered part of the West Bank, and Palestinian territories under international law. The order did not affect the station's operation in the West Bank and Gaza.

== Frequency ==
Frequency	Area
100.1 MHz	Jerusalem
90.7 MHz	Ramallah, Al-Bireh and Jenin
99.4 MHz	Nablus, Hebron, Jericho and Jordan Valley ( الأغوار )
98.8 MHz	Tulkarm and Qalqilya
89.9 MHz	Bethlehem and Tubas
103.2 MHz	South Hebron and Southern Gaza

=== Local station ===
Frequency	Area
89.5 MHz	Jenin
104.9 MHz	Bethlehem

== See also ==
- Palestinian Broadcasting Corporation
- Palestinian Satellite Channel
