= Al-Aqsa Voice Radio =

Hamas-affiliated radio station in Gaza

- Gaza City, Gaza; Palestine

Programming
- Language: Arabic

Ownership
- Owner: Hamas
- Sister stations: Al-Aqsa TV

History
- First air date: June 2003

Links
- Website: alaqsavoice.ps

Al-Aqsa Voice Radio (Arabic: إذاعة صوت الأقصى, romanized: Idhaʻah Ṣawt al-Aqṣá) is a radio station run by Hamas based in Gaza City, Gaza, Palestine. Together with sister operation Al-Aqsa TV, it is seen as one of the most influential outlets promulgating Hamas's narrative to residents of Gaza since the Second Intifada.

== History ==
Al-Aqsa is a radio station run by Hamas. It broadcasts news and religious programming. It was established in June 2003. The station is based in offices overlooking the Mediterranean Sea in Gaza City.

According to Al Jazeera, Al-Aqsa Radio is an extension of Hamas' media institution which includes TV station Al-Aqsa TV and began with the weekly newspaper Al-Risala. These outlets operate under the Al-Ribat Media and Artistic Production Company, chaired by senior Hamas official Fathi Hammad. The radio station gained notice for its coverage of Israeli military actions during the Second Intifada and increased in popularity after it was bombed in 2004. The radio station uses inflammatory language, which journalist Shadi al-Kashif says matches what listeners want.

By 2006, the station employed approximately 20 men under the age of 30, who are either members or supporters of Hamas. They are all graudates of local universities and received professional training from abroad. News director Ibrahim Daher stated that the work environment was not suitable for women due to the need to separate women and men in the workplace.

The radio station, along with its sister operation Al-Aqsa TV "has massaged and promulgated the Hamas narrative" since the Second Intifada. According to The Washington Post, Al-Aqsa is the most influential and far-reaching radio station in Gaza, "essentially Gaza's official state media." Ibrahim Daher, the station's director, has claimed the station's coverage is the leading reason behind Hamas's popularity in Gaza, including by not reporting on negative news about Hamas.

According to the Israeli Shin Bet, Hamas has attempted to incite members in the West Bank to commit attacks via the radio station.

In 2019, the Shin Bet discovered that an antenna located on a position shared by Hezbollah and the Lebanese Army in Marwahin, Lebanon, on the Israel-Lebanon border, had been broadcasting Al-Aqsa's signal from Lebanon into Israel. The broadcasts included messages to Hamas prisoners and could be accessed in Israeli prisons in the Central District and North District. Israel submitted an official complaint to the International Telecommunication Union.
