= Al-Aqsa TV =

Palestinian political television channel

- Country: Palestine
- Broadcast area: Middle East, Webcast
- Network: al-Aqsa Media Network
- Headquarters: Gaza

Programming
- Language: Arabic

Ownership
- Owner: Hamas

History
- Launched: 9 January 2006

Links
- Website: www.alaqsanet.news (ar)

Al-Aqsa TV (Arabic: قناة الأقصى) is a television channel run by Hamas, which is based in the Gaza Strip. Its programs include news and propaganda promoting Hamas, children's shows, and religiously inspired entertainment.

It is currently directed by Fathi Hamad, who is a member of the Palestinian Legislative Council and Interior Minister of the Gaza Strip. The channel is named after Al-Aqsa in Jerusalem.

== History ==
Al-Aqsa TV was founded in 2005 and was named after Al-Aqsa mosque. It began broadcasting in the Gaza Strip on 9 January 2006, after Hamas won a decisive victory in the 2006 Palestinian legislative election. On 22 January 2006, the Palestinian public prosecutor Ahmed Maghni moved to close down the Al-Aqsa TV because it did not have the necessary broadcast license, but the decision was never enforced. Al-Aqsa TV claimed to be independent from Hamas, but many Hamas members worked for the channel as senior employees, such as Ismail Haniyeh's son, who hosted a weekly sports program. The channel had 200 employees.

The station programming consisted of Quran recitation sessions, sports and propaganda praising "resistance". Al-Aqsa TV's commentary referred to Israel as "Zionist enemy" and those associated with Palestinian Authority President Mahmoud Abbas as "coup plotters". The station documented vehicular attacks, stabbings and other attacks against IDF troops occupying West Bank. Al-Aqsa TV attracted many controversies, with Israeli critics accusing it of inciting violence and antisemitism. US lawmakers accused it of supporting terrorist activities.

In June 2010, the French government ordered Eutelsat to stop broadcasting Al-Aqsa TV in the country because its programming violated French laws against promoting violence and racial hatred. Hezbollah condemned France, saying the decision violated freedom of speech. In February 2014, Egyptian military government raided offices Al-Aqsa TV and Al-Jazeera in Cairo for criticizing military coup and confiscated their equipment. In December 2015, Palestinian Authority banned communication companies from airing Al-Aqsa TV.

In September 2016, the U.S. Department of State named Fathi Hamad a Specially Designated Terrorist in his role as the director of Al-Aqsa TV, which the U.S. said aired "programs designed to recruit children to become Hamas armed fighters and suicide bombers". In December 2018, after Israeli airstrikes destroyed Al-Aqsa TV's headquarters and studios, the channel announced that it will cease operations indefinitely due to lack of funds. A few days later, Ismail Haniyeh announced that the channel would continue to operate and that its financial problems had been "partially resolved".

In March 2025, several European countries and the United States announced a ban on Al-Aqsa TV's use of satellite networks and the imposition of punishments on satellite companies if they continued to broadcast the channel. Palestinian Islamic Jihad and Hamas condemned the decision, calling it a "violation of media freedom". The decision was made following a report from Israel.

== Israeli operations ==
On 29 December 2008, during the Gaza War, Israeli aircraft repeatedly bombed the television station headquarters in Gaza City. The building was completely destroyed, but the station continued to broadcast from a mobile TV unit. On 18 November 2012, IDF airstrike damaged Al-Aqsa TV office in Gaza City. In November 2013, two Al-Aqsa TV cameramen were killed by IDF missile during clashes between Israel and Hamas.

On 29 July 2014, during the 2014 Gaza War, an Israeli air strike hit a media building housing al-Aqsa TV and Al-Aqsa Radio in the centre of Gaza City early in the morning. The television station continued to broadcast, but the radio station went silent, though it later returned to the air.

On 12 November 2018, Israel bombed the station building after launching at least five non-exploding missiles nearby as warnings to evacuate followed a surge in cross-border fighting. In February, 2019 Shin Bet assessed that al-Aqsa TV used coded messages to recruit operatives to Hamas. In March 2019, Israeli Ministry of Defense has designated al-Aqsa TV a terrorist organization. In response, Palestinian Journalists Syndicate and Palestinian Center for Human Rights staged a protest near damaged al-Aqsa TV building, condemning Israeli Prime Minister Benjamin Netanyahu for the decision.

On October 12, 2023, Al-Aqsa TV's broadcast was briefly hacked, calling on all residents of the Gaza Strip to seek shelter, stating: "Hamas destroyed the Gaza Strip and smuggled its leaders to safe places. Now you have to protect yourselves, evacuate your homes, and go to safe places because the blow will be fatal". Hamas claimed Israel was behind the incident.

== Criticism ==
In May 2013, al-Aqsa TV became the focus of media scrutiny after a decision by the Newseum to honor two al-Aqsa TV members as part of its ongoing memorial to journalists who lost their lives in the line of duty in 2012. The U.S. government classifies al-Aqsa TV as being controlled by Hamas, a "Specially Designated Global Terrorist," and states that it "will not distinguish between a business financed and controlled by a terrorist group, such as Al-Aqsa Television, and the terrorist group itself."

Tomorrow's Pioneers, a children's television show produced by the network, received criticism due to its promotion of antisemitic and violent themes. Following complaints by Israeli watchdog groups that triggered international scrutiny, Palestinian Information Minister Mustafa Barghouti said he had asked Al-Aqsa TV to stop broadcasts so the content could be reviewed. Tomorrow's Pioneers defied Barghouti's call and continued to air as usual.

In May 2008, Basem Naim, the minister of health in the Hamas government in Gaza, responded to allegations of antisemitism in Al-Aqsa TV programmes. In his letter to The Guardian, Naim stated that the Al-Aqsa Channel is an independent media institution that often does not express the views of the Hamas government or the Hamas movement. In response, The Guardian columnist Alan Johnson wrote that Al-Aqsa TV cannot be a media institution independent of Hamas, because it is headed by Fathi Hamad, chairman of a Hamas-run company that also produces the Hamas radio station and its bi-weekly newspaper, and because, since 2007, Hamas had blocked Palestinian National Authority broadcasts into Gaza, which indicated that there is no independent media in Gaza.

About reporting, Ibrahim Daher, a director at Al-Aqsa media operation, said they may not broadcast certain news. He said “If there was bad news during the war, or something went wrong, we just kept silent about it” and “now we mostly keep silent about the blockade, and that Hamas wasn't able to lift it during the war”.

== See also ==
- al-Aqsa Foundation
- Al-Aqsa Voice Radio
- Al Fateh, Hamas' website for children
- Al Manar
- Palestinian Broadcasting Corporation
