= Palestinian Broadcasting Corporation =

Television station of Palestine

Palestinian Authority Broadcasting Corporation (PBC)
- هيئة الإذاعة والتلفزيون الفلسطينية

Agency overview
- Formed: 1 July 1994
- Headquarters: Ramallah, Palestine
- Agency executive: Ahmad Hazoury, General manager
- Child agencies: Voice of Palestine; Palestinian Satellite Channel
- Website: www.pbc.ps

The Palestinian Authority Broadcasting Corporation (PBC; Arabic: هيئة الإذاعة والتلفزيون الفلسطينية, romanized: Hayʾat al-ʾIḏāʿa wa-t-Tilifizyūn al-Filasṭīniyya) or Palestine Authority Public Broadcasting Corporation (الهيئة العامة للإذاعة والتلفزيون الفلسطينية al-Hayʾa l-ʿĀmma li-l-ʾIḏāʿa wa-t-Tilifizyūn al-Filasṭīniyya), also known as Palestine Authority TV, was established on 1 July 1994 and is within the jurisdiction of the Palestinian Authority.

PBC has a subsidiary radio station known as the Voice of Palestine and a satellite channel known as Palestinian Satellite Channel. Palestine TV first began broadcasting in 1996 in Gaza.

== History ==
Former logo of the Palestinian Broadcasting Corporation.

The first head of the PBC was Fatah activist and Arafat loyalist Radwan Abu Ayyash, former head of the Arab Journalists' Association. On 3 May 1994, PBC initiated a seven-week training course with Egyptian Television; subsequently PBC would open its services on 1 July. Initially, PBC Radio would operate eight hours a day, and the television station from 4pm to 8pm daily, with readings from the Quran, cartoons, cultural programs and a half-hour news bulletin. Late on 6 June, PBC TV made its first television test broadcasts from a converted hotel, showing the corporation's logo in English and Arabic. Up until then, the PLO only beamed radio programs from stations in Cairo, Baghdad and Tunis.

The PBC had a terrestrial television network, comprising channel 5 in Nablus, channel 21 in Khan Yunis, channel 21 in Jericho (very low power), channel 23 from Kasser El Hakim, channel 25 in the de facto capital Ramallah, channel 30 in Halhul, channel 31 in Jenin, and channels 4 and 34 in Beit Jala. In their early years, these channels had broadcast 12 hours a day and up to 18 hours during holidays.

PBC gained more sophisticated television equipment in July 1995 using a transmitter in Ramallah and was operating from studios on the capitals of both sides, in Ramallah and Gaza.

On 19 January 2002, the Israel Defense Forces used explosives to destroy the five-story main building and transmission tower of the PBC in Ramallah, claiming retaliation for the killing of six people by a Palestinian gunman linked to Fatah. The Israeli government later singled out PBC for broadcasting material deemed to be antisemitic or that incited violence.

The corporation is a former associate member of the European Broadcasting Union, and was reportedly seeking to become an active member. However, the Palestinian Authority is not a member of the required organizations, and thus does not comply with the criteria. Currently, the broadcaster is a member of the Arab States Broadcasting Union (ASBU).

== Financing ==
The PBC was funded partially by the US government until 1998. In 2010, the Palestinian Authority Mahmoud Abbas issued a decree converting the PBC into a public institution.
