= List of civilians killed in the Gaza war =

Palestinians killed from 2023 to present

This is a list of notable civilians killed by Israel during the Gaza war and genocide. Included are numerous journalists who have been killed, from agencies including Al Jazeera, Associated Press, and Reuters, as well as photojournalists and freelance journalists. Professional athletes include two former international footballers, a volleyball player, and a karate champion expected to compete at the Olympics prior to her bombing in a refugee camp; among other civilians are poets, novelists, professors, doctors, social media personalities, and community volunteers. Some entries include families killed in airstrikes with the most deaths per family recorded at 54.

== List ==
Name	Date of death	Age	Occupation	Means of death	Refs
Awni El-Dous	7 October 2023	12–13	Gradeschooler, YouTuber, gamer, computer enthusiast	Home airstrike	
Mohammad Al-Salhi	7 October 2023	28–29	Photojournalist, freelance media worker	Refugee camp airstrike	
Omar Abu Shawish	7 October 2023	36	Poet, journalist, social activist, novelist	Refugee camp airstrike	
Abu Qouta family	7 October 2023	/	19 family members, the youngest a baby under one year old	Home airstrike	
Wael Al Zard	13 October 2023	50	Islamic preacher, professor	Home airstrike	
Heba Zagout	13 October 2023	39	Artist and schoolteacher	Home airstrike	
Omar Ferwana	15 October 2023	67	Gynaecologist, researcher, assistant professor	Home airstrike	
Mohamed al-Dalou	16 October 2023	54	Sports worker, athlete	Home airstrike	
Hiba Abu Nada	20 October 2023	32	Poet, novelist, nutritionist, women's rights activist, Wikimedian	Home airstrike	
Roshdi Sarraj	22 October 2023	31	Freelance journalist, filmmaker	Home airstrike	
Ibrahim al-Astal	23 October 2023	62	Educational theorist, researcher, professor	Home airstrike	
Duaa Sharaf	26 October 2023	32	Journalist, radio presenter	Home airstrike	
Hammam Alloh	12 November 2023	36	Nephrologist	Home airstrike	
Ibrahim Qusaya	14 November 2023	32	Volleyball player	Refugee camp airstrike	
Mohammed Shabir	14 November 2023	77	Politician, academic	Airstrike	
Belal Jadallah	19 November 2023	45	Journalist, NGO director	Neighborhood airstrike	
Ayat Khadoura	20 November 2023	27	Journalist, podcaster, Instagram activist	Home airstrike	
Al-Hasayna family	23 November 2023	/	54 family members	Home airstrike	
Abu Sharia family	23 November 2023	/	38 family members	Home airstrike	
Sufian Tayeh	2 December 2023	52	Scientist, president of the Islamic University of Gaza	Home airstrike	
Refaat Alareer	6 December 2023	44	Writer, poet, professor, activist	Home airstrike	
Samer Abu Daqqa	15 December 2023	45	Al-Jazeera video journalist	School airstrike	
Khaled Nabhan	16 December 2023	54	Social media personality	Refugee camp airstrike	
Samar Anton	16 December 2023	50	Catholic community volunteer	Shot in head by sniper	
Nahida Anton	16 December 2023	70	Catholic community volunteer	Shot 3 times by sniper	
Zorob family	19 December 2023	/	22 members of the Zorob family and other families	Home airstrike	
Hani Al-Masdar	6 January 2024	42	Athlete, sports coach	Village airstrike	
Hamza Al-Dahdouh	7 January 2024	27	Al Jazeera journalist	Car airstrike	
Nagham Abu Samra	12 January 2024	24	Karate champion, sports icon, expected Olympic athlete	Refugee camp airstrike	
Hind Rajab	29 January 2024	5 (Note: Most media sources reported Rajab's age at death as six years old. Euro-Mediterranean Human Rights Monitor and CNN reported that Rajab was five years old. A list released by the Gaza Health Ministry in September 2024 of people killed during the Gaza war with their ID number, age, gender, and birthdate list Rajab as having been 5 years old.)	Preschooler	Shot by tank	
Sidra Hassouna	12 February 2024	7	Gradeschooler	Home airstrike	
Mohammed Barakat	11 March 2024	39	Former international footballer, nicknamed "the Legend of Khan Younis"	Home airstrike	
Adnan al-Bursh	19 April 2024	50	Orthopedic surgeon, head of orthopedics at Al-Shifa Hospital	Torture	
Mohammad Bhar	3 July 2024	24	Man with Down syndrome, autism	Mauled by military dog	
Ismail al-Ghoul	31 July 2024	27	Al-Jazeera journalist, correspondent	Refugee camp airstrike	
Medo Halimy	26 August 2024	19	Social media personality, blogger	Street airstrike	
Rashad Abu Sakhila	2 September 2024	23	Actor, poet	School airstrike	
Wafa Al-Udaini	29 September 2024	38–39	Freelance journalist	Home airstrike	
Shaban al-Dalou	14 October 2024	19	Software engineering student, PlayStation gamer, football fan, provider for family	Mosque airstrike	
Mahasen al-Khateeb	18 October 2024	30–31	Freelance artist, illustrator, character designer	Neighborhood airstrike	
Hala Khreis	12 November 2024	57	None	shot while holding white flag and grandson's hand	
Mahmoud Almadhoun	30 November 2024	33	Chef and founder of Gaza Soup Kitchen	Drone strike while bringing food aid to hospital	
Layla Al-Khatib	25 January 2025	2	None, toddler	Shot in the head	
Hossam Shabat	24 March 2025	23	Journalist, Al Jazeera correspondent	Car airstrike	
Fatima Hassouna	16 April 2025	25–26	Photojournalist	Home airstrike	
Yahya Sobeih	7 May 2025	25–35	Journalist, editor, reporter	Restaurant airstrike	
Hassan Aslih	13 May 2025	25–35	Photojournalist	Hospital airstrike	
Yaqeen Hammad	23 May 2025	11	Gradeschooler, social media influencer, humanitarian aid volunteer	Home airstrike	
al-Najjar children	23 May 2025	/	9 children	Home airstrike	
Ismail Abu Hatab	30 June 2025	32	Photojournalist	Internet café airstrike	
Ibrahim Hajjaj	30 July 2025	36–37	Photojournalist	Neighborhood airstrike	
Suleiman Obeid	6 August 2025	41	Former international footballer, nicknamed "Palestinian Pelé"	Shot waiting for humanitarian aid	
Anas Al-Sharif	10 August 2025	28	Al Jazeera journalist, videographer	Media tent airstrike	
Mohammed Salama	25 August 2025	23–24	Photojournalist, war correspondent	Hospital airstrike	
Moaz Abu Taha	25 August 2025	26–27	Freelance video journalist	Hospital airstrike	
Ahmed Abu Aziz	25 August 2025	27–28	Freelance journalist, correspondent	Hospital airstrike	
Mariam Dagga	25 August 2025	33	Associated Press visual journalist	Hospital airstrike	
Hussam al-Masri	25 August 2025	48–49	Reuters cameraman, photojournalist	Hospital airstrike	
Yahya Barzaq	30 September 2025	34–35	Freelance photojournalist, photographer	Cafe airstrike	
Ahmed Abu Mutair	19 October 2025	37	Broadcast engineer, described as talented repairman and technician	Broadcasting office airstrike	
Saleem Al-Ashqar	29 June 2026	32	Footballer, goalkeeper	Shot while looking for cooking gas	
Mohammed al-Wahidi	7 July 2026	65	aid worker who organized screenings of the 2026 World Cup	Israeli air strike on taxi	
Wafaa Akila	6 September 2026	8	student	Israeli air strike while she was buying school supplies	
Mohammad Abdul Zinati	15 September 2026	15	none	killed in an Israeli double-tap strike while running to assist an injured Palestinian paramedic	
Rizk Abu Shaira	11 November 2026	52	surgeon	Israeli airstrike on Nasser Hospital	

== Analysis ==
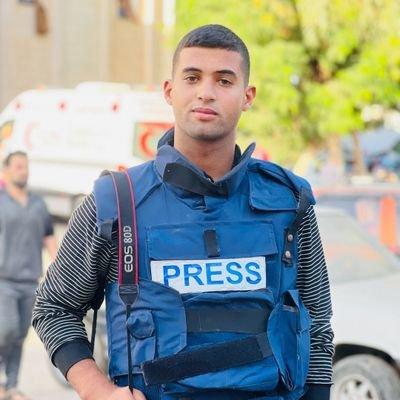
Palestinian correspondent for Al Jazeera Mubasher, Hossam Shabat, was one of over two hundred journalists killed in the Gaza war.

The Gaza Strip suffered significant civilian casualties from Israeli bombardments in the beginning of the war.

On 3 November 2023, at least 10 cemetery workers were killed by an Israeli airstrike while working at a graveyard in Beit Lahia. On 4 November, an unnamed Israeli official said that around 20,000 people had been killed in Gaza, "most of them terrorists." On 14 November, two volleyball players, Hassan Zuaiter and Ibrahim Qusaya, were killed in an Israeli airstrike on Jabalia refugee camp. As of 1 December 102 UNRWA employees in Gaza had been killed in Israeli airstrikes. On 29 December, UNRWA reported 308 people had been killed in UNRWA shelters. Euro-Mediterranean Human Rights Monitor reported that the IDF was taking and holding Palestinian bodies from Gaza, prompting calls for an international investigation on organ theft suspicions. The organization further stated that Israel had systematically killed hundreds of tech specialists, including "programmers, information technology experts, and computer engineering analysts". In March 2024, Al Jazeera English's news blog reported that Israeli forces conducted a pattern of killing entire families by targeting the homes they were sheltering in. An entire family, including both parents and four sons, were shot dead by the IDF in December 2023.

According to the Gaza Health Ministry, at least 50 people were killed by Israeli strikes on Jabalia on 31 October and 1 November. Significant civilian casualties were reported following the Al-Ahli Arab Hospital explosion, the Jabalia camp airstrike on 31 October, and the Fakhoora school airstrike on 4 November. Other mass casualty events included the Church of Saint Porphyrius airstrike and the al-Shati refugee camp airstrike, as well as numerous attacks on refugee camps, schools, and healthcare facilities. The United Nations stated they had recorded seven mass casualty incidents just between 24 and 29 October 2024 in the Gaza Strip.

By late-June 2024, a Palestinian NGO reported that as many as 10,000 Palestinians had been disabled by injuries related to the war. According to public health experts, such as chair of global public health at the University of Edinburgh Devi Sridhar, the death tolls in the Gaza Strip are likely an undercount.

In September 2025, The Guardian citing data from independent conflict tracker ACLED, that is backed by western governments and the UN, reported a vast majority of Palestinians killed were civilians since Israel's renewed offensive earlier in March. Over a six-month period, ACLED had tracked reports on losses inflicted on Hamas and allied armed groups from "reliable local and international media", Israeli military statements and statements from Hamas and found that Israel's claim of combatants killed had exceeded what could be independently verified. ACLED report wrote, "Since 18 March, Israel claims it killed more than 2,100 operatives, though Acled data indicates that the number is closer to 1,100, and includes Hamas’ political figures, as well as fighters from other groups". Earlier in August 2025, The Guardian cited a classified Israeli military internal report, noting that, if the data was accurate, approximately 83% of Palestinians killed would have been civilians. This ratio of civilian to combatants among dead, is considered unusually high for modern warfare even when compared with conflicts like Sudanese and Syrian Civil War, renown for their indiscriminate killings. The Israeli military had rejected the analysis, arguing that militant deaths may have been undercounted, but did not release alternative casualty figures or a detailed methodology to support its position.

Investigative reports by +972 Magazine and Local Call, as well as reporting by Haaretz, indicates that the Israel Defense Forces (IDF) have, at times, misreported or classified a high number of civilian deaths as "militants". For example, +972 and Local Call reported that an Israeli battalion stationed in Rafah recorded around 100 Palestinians as militants; however an officer in that battalion later stated that only two of the 100 Palestinians were armed. In a separate case, Haaretz reported that an IDF spokesman stated that all 200 Palestinians who had been killed by the 252nd Division in the Netzarim Corridor were "terrorists", but only 10 of the 200 individuals were subsequently verified as Hamas operatives. In April 2024, members of Israeli Knesset's Foreign Affairs and Defense Committee had expressed doubt on the figures given to them by the army and later found the army had inflated the militant casualties "in order to create a 2:1 ratio" of civilian to militant deaths. An Israeli intelligence source told The Guardian, +972, and Local Call that they had used figures based primarily on officer testimonies, which likely overcounted Hamas deaths. In contrast, the figures in Israel's internal intelligence database are the only numbers that the army could rely on with "a high degree of certainty" as it uses person-by-person analysis; however, this method may also undercount the number of Hamas deaths.

Israeli forces killed at least eight Palestinians in Gaza, including a father and his 13-year-old son. Since the establishment of a ceasefire brokered by the United States, more than 1,600 Palestinians in Gaza have lost their lives; meanwhile, the total number of casualties from October 7, 2023, to November 2026 has reached over 74,000.

== See also ==
- List of journalists killed in the Gaza war
- List of Gaza war hostages
- Casualties of the Gaza war
- Additional civilian deaths:
  - Awdah Hathaleen (died 28 July 2024), activist and documentary consultant, shot and killed by Israeli settler
  - Fathi Ghaben (died 25 February 2024), artist and educator who died due to lack of medical care for lung issues
  - Majed Abu Maraheel (died 11 June 2024), first Palestinian to compete in the Olympics, long-distance runner, football player, security officer, and athletics coach who died due to lack of medical care for kidney failure
