= List of entire families killed in the Gaza war =

The Gaza war has seen multiple reports of entire families killed. According to humanitarian groups and media, such incidents have occurred both in southern Israel, where families were killed by Hamas-led militants during the 7 October 2023 attacks, and in Gaza, where Israeli airstrikes and shelling have destroyed family homes. Some scholars and observers have described these patterns as targeting of family units, coining terms such as "kinocide". Others have argued that the cases raise concerns about possible war crimes or genocide, though such characterizations remain legally contested.

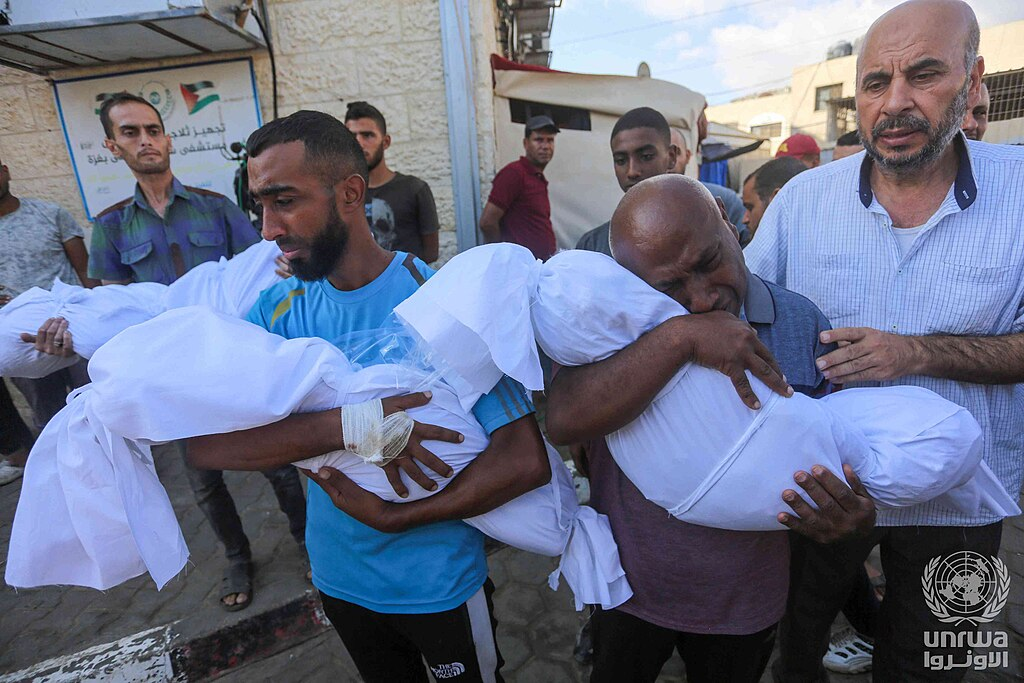
A Palestinian man holds his family killed in an Israel airstrike

== In Gaza ==
As of August 2026, over 6,000 Palestinian families have been reduced to a single surviving member, while more than 2,700 entire families have been completely wiped from official records with zero survivors, according to records from the Gaza Civil Registry and health authorities.

=== Abu Qouta family (Rafah, 7 October 2023) ===
On 7 October 2023, an Israeli airstrike struck a multi-story building in Rafah housing the extended Abu Qouta family, killing up to 27 civilians and injuring 25 others. Among the victims were 19 members of the Abu Qouta family spanning multiple generations, including Abdul Hamid Abu Qouta, his wife Sarah, and all five of their children, as well as five neighbors.

=== Al-Mughari family (Bureij, 17 October 2023) ===
On 17 October 2023, an Israeli airstrike on the Bureij refugee camp killed at least 92 civilians, including dozens of members of the Al-Mughari family. Among the victims were 87-year-old Ramadan al-Mughari, his sons Nayef, Dr. Ahmed, and Nafez, and several grandchildren. The Israeli military stated that the strike targeted Hamas commander Ayman Nofal, who was killed in the same incident.

=== Al Zaneen family (Izbet Beit Hanoun, 8 October 2023) ===
On 8 October 2023, an Israeli airstrike struck the house of the Al Zaneen family in Beit Hanoun, killing at least 21 relatives across three generations. Among the victims were family patriarch Jamil Hassan Al Zaneen, his wife Salma, their adult sons, and their grandchildren. The casualties also included Hussam Jameel Al Zaneen, his wife Heba, and all six of their children

=== Al-Qatnani family (Beit Lahia, 9 October 2023) ===
On 9 October 2023, an Israeli airstrike destroyed the four-story home of the Al-Qatnani family in Beit Lahia, killing between 13 and 15 relatives across three generations. Among the victims were family patriarch Musa Al-Qatnani, his wife Basma, their adult sons, and their grandchildren, including Samir Al-Qatnani, his wife Rana, and all four of their children. Child rights monitors documented Al-Qatnani children among those killed, and human rights groups reported multiple incidents in which entire families were killed in their homes.

=== Al-Hassayna and Abu Shari'a family (Sabra, November 2023) ===
On 22 November 2023, around 308 members of the Al-Hassayna family, also known as the Abu Shari'a family, were killed by Israel after Israeli airstrikes targeted apartment buildings in Sabra, Gaza City. Among the victims, 44 of them were children, 37 were women and more than 10 members suffered from disabilities. On 4 August 2026, after identifying the last 112 remaining members of the family, they were buried and laid to rest in Gaza City.

=== Salem family (Gaza Strip, 19 December 2023) ===
In December 2023, airstrikes on Deir al-Balah killed members of the Salem family, including children. Humanitarian organization reported more than 170 relatives killed in multiple strikes.

=== Shehadeh family (Gaza City, October 2023) ===
An Israeli strike in October 2023 killed at least 36 members of the Shehadeh family, destroying their residential block in Gaza City.

=== Zorob family (Rafah, 2023) ===
In late 2023, an Israeli strike in Rafah killed 25 members of the Zorob family.

=== Hassouna family (Gaza, 2023–2025) ===
Israeli airstrikes in Gaza killed multiple members of families bearing the surname Hassouna across separate incidents. On 12 February 2025, an airstrike in Rafah destroyed the home of Karam and Amouna Hassouna, killing both parents, their seven-year-old twin daughters Sidra and Suzan, their 15-month-old son Malik, as well as their grandparents and an uncle. In April 2025, Palestinian photojournalist Fatima Hassouna was killed in an Israeli airstrike on her home in northern Gaza alongside six family members, including her pregnant sister.

=== Hamada family (Gaza City, 2024) ===
On 29 January 2024, five-year-old Hind Rajab was killed in Gaza City alongside six members of her mother's Hamada family, after being trapped in a car hit by Israeli fire. The casualties included Hind's uncle Bashar Hamada, her aunt Anam, and all four of their children.

=== Mughrabi family (Gaza City, 22 December 2023) ===
On 22 December 2023, an Israeli airstrike killed Issam al-Mughrabi, a UNDP staff member, his wife Lamia, several of their children, and more than 70 members of his extended family in Gaza City.

=== Alloh family (Gaza City, November 2023) ===
On 11 November 2023, Dr. Hammam Alloh, a physician at al-Shifa Hospital, was killed in an Israeli airstrike along with his wife, children, and father. In the same month, his relatives Razan (12), Nouran (10), and their father Ahmed were killed by a sniper near their home in Gaza City.

=== Al-Tabatibi family (Nuseirat, 15 March 2024 - Daraj, 12 April 2024) ===
On 15 March 2024, an overnight Israeli airstrike struck a residential building near the Nuseirat refugee camp where members of the extended Al-Tabatibi family were gathered to prepare suhoor during Ramadan. The attack killed at least 36 relatives spanning multiple generations. On the early hours of 12 April 2024, another Israeli strike killed 25 members of the family in Daraj.

== In Israel ==
=== Siman Tov family (Nir Oz, 7 October 2023) ===
According to Haaretz, Hamas fighters killed Tamar Kedem and Yonatan Siman Tov and their three children, Shahar, Arbel, and Omer, inside their home at Nir Oz kibbutz on 7 October 2023. Yonatan's mother, Carol, was also killed in the attack.

=== Kutz family (Nir Oz, 7 October 2023) ===
In the Kfar Aza kibbutz, Hamas militants killed Aviv and Livnat Kutz along with their three teenaged children.

== In Lebanon ==
=== Gharib family (Tyre, 23 September 2024) ===
On 23 September 2024, an Israeli airstrike struck the apartment of the Gharib family in the Al-Housh neighborhood of Tyre, southern Lebanon, killing five relatives. The victims were identified as Ahmed Gharib, his wife Hanan Sabra Gharib, and their three daughters Rasha (24), Maya (23), and Nour (20). The family was preparing for a wedding when the strike hit. The Israeli military claimed it targeted a Hezbollah site nearby.

== Investigations and accountability ==
Palestinian human rights groups including Euro-Med Human Rights Monitor have investigated specific cases of family killings in the Gaza war, which they label as a "family massacre". The Palestinian Centre for Human Rights has also documented cases of "annihilation" of families. Israel has stated that its strikes target militants and military infrastructure, and that Hamas operates from within civilian areas, placing responsibility for civilian casualties on the group.

Academic researchers have described the phenomenon of entire families being killed as unprecedented in scale. The killing of families across generations by Israel was highlighted specifically in South Africa's International Court of Justice filing accusing Israel of genocide.

The abduction and killing of families in southern Israel have been described as war crimes. The UN Independent International Commission of Inquiry on the Occupied Palestinian Territory, including East Jerusalem, and Israel reported that deliberate attacks on civilians, including the killing of families in Kfar Aza, Nir Oz, and Be’eri, violated international humanitarian law. A study published by Israeli legal scholars referred to the systematic erasure of kinship groups as “kinocide.”

== See also ==
- Casualties of the Gaza war
