= Khaled Nabhan =

Palestinian social media personality (1969–2024)

- خالد نبهان
- Nabhan with his granddaughter, Reem
- Born: 23 December 1969
- Died: 16 December 2024 (aged 54); Khan Younis, Gaza Strip, Palestine
- Cause of death: Israeli tank shelling
- Other name: Abu Diaa
- Occupations: Influencer, gardener
- Known for: Being an influencer during the Gaza war

Khaled Nabhan (Note: Arabic: خالد نبهان) (23 December 1969 – 16 December 2024), also known by the kunya Abu Diaa, (Note: Arabic: ابو ضياء) was a Palestinian social media personality. He is best known for appearing in a video that showed him holding his granddaughter who had died after an Israeli airstrike, becoming notable for his frequent usage of the phrase 'Soul of my soul' in the same video. He was killed on 16 December 2024, after an Israeli airstrike on Gaza's Nuseriat camp.

== Background ==
Nabhan was born on 23 December 1969 to a Muslim Palestinian family from the central Gaza Strip and worked as a gardener prior to the start of the Gaza war. His granddaughter, Reem, was born on the same date in 2019. As the girl's father worked abroad outside of Gaza, Nahban took care of her and the rest of her family. He stated that neither he nor anyone in his family were fighters for Hamas or its conflict with Israel.

== Gaza war ==
During the early stages of the Gaza war, Israel's nascent bombing campaign over the territory was, according to commentator Fawaz Turki, nearly indiscriminate, striking "homes, multistorey residential buildings, schools, hospitals, marketplaces, mosques and all standing infrastructure, densely populated refugee camps." With the absence of any civilian air raid shelters, Nabhan and his family; his wife, his daughter Maysa, and his grandchildren Reem and Tariq, resided in their home at the Nuseirat refugee camp.

=== Killing of Reem and Tariq Nabhan ===
On 21 November 2023, at approximately 02:00 local time, an airstrike launched by the Israeli Defense Forces struck Nuseirat, including Nabhan's home. The blast had caused the structure to collapse over the family while they were asleep. Nabhan recalled waking up screaming, for his grandchildren while attempting to wade through the debris in the dark, but was unsuccessful in rescuing them and eventually fell unconscious. Maysa recalled from the attack: "I heard Reem screaming next to me, I told her there is something heavy on top of me, I can’t reach you. I said my final prayers and next I woke up in the hospital." Reem and her five-year-old brother Tariq were trapped under the rubble and killed. Nabhan stated that they had not been informed by Israel of any airstrike.

The next day, Reem and Tariq were prepared for burial. A video depicted Nabhan holding and kissing Reem, opening her eyelids, speaking to, and shaking her as if she were still alive before he gave her to the paramedics for burial. Another video showed him fixing the hair of Tariq as the two children were laid on the ground underneath a white shroud. The videos soon went viral on social media. Nabhan's usage of the Arabic phrase "soul of my soul" while speaking to Reem for the final time received particular recognition. According to The Washington Post, Reem was one of 899 3-year-old children killed in the Gaza war by 15 July 2025.

In June 2024, Australian band The Herd released the song titled Soul Of My Soul, in reference to Nabhan's usage of the phrase.

Nabhan later posted videos on social media documenting his life during the war, which mainly showed him helping injured people in hospitals and giving aid to children. The fame he gained through the viral video allowed him to become a global icon and a "one-man relief agency", regularly distributing food and water throughout Gaza.

=== Death ===
On 16 December 2024, Nabhan was killed following an Israeli bombing strike. Saed Nabhan, Nabhan's nephew, told CNN that eyewitnesses reported his uncle rushed to assist injured individuals after a tank shelling in their neighborhood but was immediately killed by a second tank shell. His death was condemned by the Council on American–Islamic Relations. He was mourned by imam Omar Suleiman on social media and by rapper Tamer Nafar in a Haaretz op-ed. Dearborn mayor Abdullah Hammoud encouraged Democrats to vote uncommitted in the 2024 Democratic presidential primary in honor of Nabhan and his granddaughter.

== See also ==
- Attacks on refugee camps in the Gaza war
- List of civilian fatalities in the Gaza war
