= Ibrahim Hajjaj =

Palestinian photojournalist

- إبراهيم محمود رجب حجاج
- Born: 1987 or 1988
- Died: 30 July 2025 (aged 36–37); Al-Daraj Gaza City, Palestine
- Cause of death: Israeli airstrike
- Other name: Ibrahim Mahmoud Hajjaj
- Occupation: Photojournalist
- Organization: Palestinian Journalists' Syndicate

Ibrahim Mahmoud Hajjaj was a Palestinian photojournalist, member of the Palestinian Journalists' Syndicate, who was killed on 30 July 2025, during an Israeli airstrike in Gaza City while covering residential damage. He contributed to Independent Arabia.

== Death ==
On 30 July 2025, Hajjaj was killed by Israeli shelling in the Al-Daraj neighbourhood of Gaza City, near Al-Zahraa School.

The Palestinian Journalists' Syndicate stated he was "killed in an Israeli airstrike in Gaza City's Al-Daraj neighborhood while documenting the ongoing aggression." He was survived by his three children.

The Union of Organization of Islamic Cooperation News Agencies (UNA-OIC) called for accountability, describing Hajjaj's death as part of a pattern of violence against journalists.
