= Awni El-Dous =

Palestinian YouTuber (died 2023)

- Awni El-Dous's profile picture
- Born: 2010 or 2011
- Died: 7 October 2023 (aged 12–13); Gaza City, Gaza Governorate, Gaza

YouTube information
- Channel: awni eldous
- Years active: 2020–2023
- Genre: Gaming
- Subscribers: 1.74 million
- Views: 4.6 million
- Last updated: 17 August 2024

Awni El-Dous (Arabic: عوني الدوس; 2010 or 2011 – 7 October 2023) (Note: Variously described by news outlets) was a Palestinian YouTuber. His content centered around making gaming videos without commentary, with videos on games such as PUBG Mobile and Pro Evolution Soccer 2017. His content gained popularity after he was killed by an Israeli airstrike on the first night of the Gaza war.

== Life and family ==
His father was a computer engineer, which gave Awni his love for computers. Awni would copy his father, pulling apart laptops and attempting to put them back together. In photos shared on the Facebook page of his school, Safad Primary School (A) for Boys, he is shown standing in front of a blackboard holding a motherboard, leading a lesson on computer technology as a part of the Little Teachers Initiative. A member of his family called him "engineer Awni" because of his love for computers.

His channel was created on 2 May 2020, however he didn't upload his first gaming video until 12 December that year. On 18 August 2022, he made a short video thanking his fans for helping him reach 1,000 subscribers, "So now folks, let me introduce myself: I am a Palestinian from Gaza, aged 12 years old. The goal of this channel is to reach 100,000 subscribers. And 500,000, then 1 million, and God willing to reach 10 million subscribers with your support and love". On 3 August 2023, he would publish his final video, in which he played Counter Strike.

Ashraf El-Dous, a distant relative of Awni who works as a programmer and helps to run several YouTube channels, stated that Awni would frequently come to him for advice on his channel, with Awni referring to him as "brother Ashraf". He told the BBC "His ambition was to be my competitor or colleague - He created a YouTube channel. It wasn't that big, it didn't have any big views. Every start-up is hard at the beginning." His aunt, Ala'a, said that he idolised YouTubers who made his hobby their career, saying "He wanted to be like them - to have followers and fans".

== Death ==
On 7 October 2023, at around 8:20 pm that night, the top of the building was hit by two Israeli bombs, destroying it. The three-story building in Zeitoun, Gaza housed three generations of their family, with each branch housed on different floors. Awni lived on a floor with his mother, father, two older sisters and two younger brothers, all of whom were killed in the bombing. 15 people were killed in total, 7 of them being children. His uncle, Mohammad El-Dous, who was in the building at the time and lost his son in the attack, told Amnesty International "Two bombs fell suddenly on top of the building and destroyed it. My wife and I were lucky to survive because we were staying on the top floor. She was nine-months pregnant and gave birth at al-Shifa hospital a day after the attack. Our entire family has been destroyed."

Shortly after his death, one of his teachers shared a photo of himself with El-Dous, saying that he had an "ever-lasting smile." Ala'a said of him that he was "very happy and confident," and that on one "very wonderful night" she remembered watching a film with El-Dous and his siblings, sharing crisps and chocolates. She recalled the last time she saw him, at a family breakfast three weeks before his death, where she looked at his nephew and said "El-Dous is becoming a man."

Kuwaiti YouTuber AboFlah released a video on 23 October 2023 about El-Dous after seeing a video shared to him by his friend on Instagram relating to the conflict and to the death of El-Dous. When interviewed by the BBC, he said "It was very touching to hear that [El-Dous] looked up to me as a role model." When asked why he believes that El-Dous had made such a large impact, he said "Fans see themselves in Awni. We are all Awni."

At the time of the video's release, El-Dous's channel had just over 50,000 subscribers. AboFlah asked his subscribers to help El-Dous reach his goal of 100,000 subscribers. On the week of 15–21 October, El-Dous's subscriber count skyrocketed, receiving almost 26,000 subscribers, receiving another almost 700,000 subscribers the following week. By 7 November, his channel reached around 1.17 million subscribers. In December, the number has increased to more than 1.5 million.

After his death, in December 2023, Al Jazeera Arabic journalist, Ahmed Hamoush, wrote an op-ed on behalf of El-Dous to former President of the United States, Barack Obama.

== See also ==
- Effect of the Gaza war on children in the Gaza Strip
- List of civilians killed in the Gaza war
