= Killing of Ahmed Abu Mutair =

Palestinian broadcast engineer (1988–2025)

Ahmed Abu Mutair
- Died: October 19, 2025 (aged 37); Gaza Strip, Palestine
- Cause of death: Drone Strike
- Occupations: Journalist; Broadcast Engineer
- Employer: Palestine Media Company

Ahmed Abu Mutair, a Palestinian broadcast engineer, was killed by an Israel Defense Forces drone strike on October 19, 2025. The strike targeted the offices of the Palestine Media Company in Gaza, killing Mutair and an 8-year-old child, and injuring a cameraman. The killing was condemned by multiple international organizations dedicated to the protection of journalists, including the National Union of Journalists, the International Federation of Journalists, and the Palestinian Journalists' Syndicate, who called for an investigation into the killing. The Israeli Army accused Mutair of being a Hamas platoon commander; an investigation by Der Spiegel found inconsistencies in the document supporting the accusation, and was inconclusive.

Mutair is listed on UNESCO's Observatory of Killed Journalists as a cross-platform media worker; UNESCO's director general condemned his killing.

== Background ==
Over 220 journalists covering the conflict had been killed by Israeli forces at the time of Mutair's death, more than in any other modern conflict. Israeli forces agreed upon a ceasefire with Hamas on October 10. Palestinian Journalist Saleh Aljafarawi was killed in clashes in Gaza City on October 12; Israeli media labeled him a terrorist affiliated with Hamas.

== Ahmed Abu Mutair ==
Mutair was a 37-year-old engineer working for the broadcasting arm of the Palestine Media Production (PMP). Colleagues noted Mutair's exceptional skills as a repairman and technician, calling him a "genius." One colleague described Mutair as a "brilliant professional, an educated, liberal man." Mutair and other PMP journalists in Gaza City worked in a rented office that included a production facility. Mutair and the PMP regularly provided news and coverage services to local and international news agencies. Mutair and the PMP often worked for the German broadcaster ZDF through its office and reporters stationed in Tel Aviv, Israel.

== Killing ==
On Sunday, October 19, at nearly 4:30 pm, an Israeli drone fired a missile at the PMP's office in Al-Zawaida, central Gaza. Mutair was killed immediately by the strike, as was Bashar al-Zaanen, the 8-year-old son of another PMP journalist, Mohammed al-Zaanen. PMP cameraman Ismail Jabr was wounded by shrapnel from the attack. According to PMP staff, about 25 people were in the offices at the time of the attack.

Images showed the satellite news gathering transmission van of the PMP and other press vehicles damaged or destroyed by the attack. Filming equipment and broadcast cables were also destroyed.

Mutair was later mourned at the Al-Aqsa Martyrs Hospital in Deir al-Balah, Gaza. Forty-five other Palestinians in Gaza were killed by Israeli forces on the same day Mutair was killed.

== Reactions ==
One PMP journalist described the attack on Palestinian journalists as "deliberate". The Palestinian Center for Development and Media Freedoms condemned the attack and killings. The British and Irish National Union of Journalists, the International Federation of Journalists, and the Palestinian Journalists' Syndicate, all condemned the killing of Mutair and others in the attack, and called for an investigation.

The Committee to Protect Journalists requested comment from the Israel Defense Forces about Mutair's killing and received no reply.

A spokesperson for the German Foreign Ministry described the killing as "shocking". German broadcaster ZDF's editor-in-chief Bettina Schausten expressed condolences for the journalists killed and called their deaths unacceptable. A ZDF correspondent described those killed as colleagues.

The Israeli Army told the German Bild tabloid that Mutair was a Hamas platoon commander. On October 27, ZDF stated that Israel provided information indicating that Mutair was a member of Hamas. ZDF released a statement stating that it had suspended all collaboration with PMP, and that based on a document provided by Israeli, "ZDF assumes that the engineer [Mutair] was a member of the Qassam Brigades." Israeli spokespeople have often killed journalists in the Gaza War and later claimed they were militants.

An investigation by Der Spiegel found that aspected of the document provided by the Israeli Army appeared to be authentic, but noted that the signature on the document did not match that of Mutair. On November 3, after the Israeli allegations, the United Nations Educational, Scientific and Cultural Organization (UNESCO) described Mutair as a broadcast engineer for Palestine Media Production, condemned his killing, and demanded an inquiry. Mutair is listed on UNESCO's Observatory of Killed Journalists.

== Later events ==
Palestinian journalist Mohammed al-Munirawi was killed by Israeli forces several days after Mutair.

== See also ==
- Killing of journalists in the Gaza war
- Saleh al-Jafarawi
- Mariam Dagga
