= Saleem Al-Ashqar =

Palestinian footballer (1993/1994–2026)

Personal information
- Full name: Saleem Khader Al-Ashqar
- Date of birth: 1993 or 1994
- Date of death: 29 June 2026 (aged 32)
- Place of death: Al-Qarara, Gaza Strip, Palestine
- Position: Goalkeeper

Senior career*
Years	Team	Apps	(Gls)
- Al Aqsa Club
- Shabab Khan Younis
- Al-Masdar Sports Club
- Khadamat Khan Younis
- * Club domestic league appearances and goals

Saleem Khader Al-Ashqar (Arabic: سليم خضر الأشقر; 1993 or 1994 – 29 June 2026) was a Palestinian footballer who played as a goalkeeper for various clubs in the Gaza Strip. He was shot and killed by the Israeli Defense Forces (IDF) in the town of Al-Qarara in 2026.

== Career ==
Al-Ashqar played as a goalkeeper from a young age and dreamed of representing the Palestine national team. He played club football in the Gaza Strip for Al Aqsa Club, Shabab Khan Younis, Al-Masdar Sports Club, and finally, Khadamat Khan Younis, though the Gaza war both interrupted his career and resulted in severe damage to the club infrastructure of many clubs including Khadamat Khan Younis.

According to Palestine Now, Al-Ashqar was well known for his "high morals and distinguished presence on the field, where he was loved by his colleagues and everyone who knew him", as well as his "good character and humility".

"When club managements would sit with us to negotiate his contract, Saleem would tell them, ‘I don’t need money; I need to be a player who represents my homeland, my people, and the State of Palestine," recalled his uncle, Palestinian Football Association (PFA) referees committee member Farid Al-Ashqar.

== Personal life ==
Al-Ashqar was the only son in a family of six or seven sisters. He married his wife on 29 January 2026; the pair were expecting his first child at the time of his death. According to Al Jazeera, Al-Ashqar lived "a life dedicated to football and family." A relative described him as "one of the finest young men in [their] neighbourhood".

== Death and reactions ==
On 29 June 2026, Al-Ashqar was shot and killed by soldiers from the Israeli Defense Forces (IDF) while looking for cooking gas in Al-Qarara. Al-Ashqar was struck in the abdomen but doctors were unable to stop his severe internal hemorrhaging due to the Gaza Strip healthcare collapse. He died around two hours after arriving at the hospital.

According to the Palestinian Football Association (PFA), Al-Ashqar was the 1,009th Palestinian sportsperson killed by Israeli forces since the start of the Gaza war, as well as the 567th Palestinian killed from the football sector alone. His killing was condemned by the International Centre of Justice for Palestinians (ICJP) and the Communist Party of Swaziland, with the latter also condemning the "silence of the FIFA leadership". His uncle Farid Al-Ashqar, who helped raise him, accused FIFA and international federations of hypocrisy for failing to address Israel's continued attacks on civilian sportspeople in Gaza. Tributes were paid by Khadamat Khan Younis club president Abdulghani al-Sheikh, Club Deportivo Palestino, and the Turkish Minister of Youth and Sports, Osman Aşkın Bak, with the last using his to compare the 572 footballers at the World Cup with the 567 Palestinian footballers killed since October 2023.

Some sources placed his killing in the context of the attention received by the ongoing 2026 FIFA World Cup; there were various displays of solidarity with the Palestinian cause shown by different groups of fans at the tournament. Fans from countries including Algeria, Bosnia and Herzegovina, and Jordan have demonstrated their support by waving Palestinian flags.

== See also ==
- Palestinian sports during the Gaza war
- List of civilians killed in the Gaza war
- Stop The Game – A 2026 campaign against Ireland playing UEFA matches against Israel
