= Nagham Abu Samra =

Palestinian karate champion killed in Israeli air strike (1999 or 2000–2024)

- نغم أبو سمرة
- Born: 1999 or 2000; Nuseirat refugee camp, Deir al-Balah, Palestine
- Died: 12 January 2024 (aged 24); El-Arish, North Sinai, Egypt
- Cause of death: Israeli airstrike
- Education: Bachelor's and Master's in Physical Education from Al-Aqsa University
- Occupation: karateka

Nagham Abu Samra (Arabic: نغم أبو سمرة; 1999 or 2000 – 12 January 2024) was a Palestinian karate champion who opened a sports training club for girls in Gaza. Considered a Palestinian sports icon, she was expected to represent Palestine in the 2024 Summer Olympics but was killed by an Israeli airstrike during the Gaza war.

== Life and karate career ==
Abu Samra was from the Nuseirat refugee camp. She became interested in learning karate after seeing other children at a karate school near her home. At the age of 6, she started learning karate and attained a black belt in 2011. Although she was criticized by some people in her community for participating in a sport they considered to be off-limits for girls, her father Marwan supported her interest.

Abu Samra advocated for girls to participate in sports, stating: "I wanted every girl to feel her strength from within, not from those surrounding her." According to her father, she wanted to "inspire generations of girls to play karate". After obtaining bachelor's and master's degrees in Physical Education at Al-Aqsa University, Abu Samra started a gym for women and girls in 2021. It was called Fit to Be Gym.

Abu Samra competed several times at the Palestine Karate Championship, placing second in 2017 and 2018 and first in 2019. She was largely unable to compete internationally due to Israeli restrictions on Palestinian athletes. Considered a Palestinian sports icon, Abu Samra was expected to represent Palestine in the 2024 Summer Olympics.

Her mother died of cancer shortly before the Gaza war began in 2023.

== Death ==
On 17 or 18 December 2023, the Israeli military launched an airstrike on Nuseirat refugee camp that hit Abu Samra's home, killing her sister Roseanne. Abu Samra sustained serious injuries in the attack; she arrived at Al-Aqsa Martyrs Hospital in a coma and having lost her right leg. Due to Israeli attacks on the healthcare system and the shortage of medical supplies and other resources, hospitals in Gaza have limited capacity. Additionally, her family feared an Israeli airstrike would hit the hospital. Unable to adequately treat her severe injuries, the hospital attempted to obtain a permit to evacuate her. Her father made appeals via news media and social media requesting international assistance in transferring her for medical care. He told Sky News: "I am ruined. Nagham is my life and my spirit".

After several weeks, Abu Samra was granted a medical permit and transferred to a hospital in El-Arish, Egypt, arriving January 7. Her father, who travelled with her, said that Abu Samra almost died on the journey due to issues with her ventilator. Around that time, the Israeli military started attacking the Al-Aqsa hospital that had treated Abu Samra in Gaza. A few days after reaching Egypt, she died.

After Abu Samra's death, an Al-Aqsa Hospital official stated that her permit to evacuate had been granted "too late". Jibril Rajoub, the head of the Palestine Olympic Committee, called her death a loss for Palestinian sports. Abu Samra has been mentioned in several news articles as one of hundreds of Palestinian athletes killed by Israel in the Gaza war. As of May 2024, it was estimated that between 243 and 300 Palestinian athletes had been killed since the war began; by August 2026, the Palestinian Football Association estimated that over 1000 athletes had been killed.

Ala'a Al Qaisi, a Palestinian writer living in Australia, was inspired to create a play after seeing a video of Abu Samra's father Marwan sitting in the hospital with her. In The Return, Marwan waits for his deceased daughters to come back to him. The play was performed at several theaters across Australia in 2026. She is also working on another play about Abu Samra's life called Nagham of Gaza.

== See also ==
- Palestinian sports during the Israeli invasion of the Gaza Strip
- Palestine at the 2024 Summer Olympics
- Attacks on refugee camps in the Gaza war
- List of civilian fatalities in the Gaza war
