= Mohamed al-Dalou =

Palestinian table tennis executive (1968–2023)

- محمد صلاح رشيد الدلو
- Born: Mohamed Salah Rashid al-Dalou; 22 November 1968; Gaza City, Gaza Strip, Palestine
- Died: 15 October 2023 (aged 54); Tel al-Hawa, Gaza Strip, Palestine
- Other names: Mohamed S. R. Aldalou
- Occupation: Sportsman

Mohamed Salah al-Dalou (Abu Salah; Arabic: محمد صالح الدلو; 22 November 1968 – 15 October 2023) was a Palestinian head of the Palestine Table Tennis Federation (PTTF). He had also worked in the Palestinian Supreme Council for Youth and Sports, the Palestinian Football Association, and Mujama al-Islamiya.

On 15 October 2023, he, his wife and children were killed during an airstrike attack by the Israeli Air Force on his home located in Tel al-Hawa, southwest of Gaza City, during the Gaza war. Many official bodies mourned him, including the International Table Tennis Federation, the Palestinian Supreme Council for Youth and Sports, the Egypt Table Tennis Federation, the Jordan Table Tennis Federation, and others. The Arab Table Tennis Championship, which was scheduled to be held in Beirut at the end of November 2023, was postponed after he was killed.
