= Samer Abu Daqqa =

Palestinian photojournalist (1978–2023)

- سامر أبو دقة
- Born: 1978; Gaza Strip
- Died: 15 December 2023 (aged 45); Khan Yunis, occupied Gaza Strip
- Cause of death: Israeli airstrike
- Citizenship: Belgium; Palestine
- Education: Al-Azhar University
- Occupations: Video journalist, photographer, technician
- Employer(s): Al Shaab (? – 2004); Al Jazeera (2004 – 2023)
- Children: 4
- Awards: Distinguished Arab Journalist Award (2004); Distinguished International Journalist Award (2007)

Samer Abu Daqqa (Arabic: سامر أبو دقة; c. 1978 – 15 December 2023) was a Belgian-Palestinian video journalist working for Al Jazeera. He was killed during the Gaza war after the Israeli army bombed an Al Jazeera crew in Khan Yunis on 15 December 2023, while he was covering a Haifa School airstrike.

== Early life and education ==
Born in 1978, he was a native of Khan Younis. Abu Daqqa held a bachelor's degree in journalism and media from Al-Azhar University in Gaza.

== Career ==
Abu Daqqa began his work as a journalist in Al-Shaab newspaper. He then in 2004 moved to work for Al-Jazeera. He was one of the founders of the channel's office in the occupied Gaza Strip, where he worked as a photographer and technician for Al-Jazeera for more than twenty years.

== Personal life and death ==
Abu Daqqa also held Belgian citizenship and was the father of three sons and a daughter. His family lived in Belgium.

On 15 December 2023, in the Gaza war, he was killed by a drone strike that targeted the Al Jazeera crew while covering the aftermath of an earlier air strike that killed at least 20 people the Haifa School, which was being used by the United Nations Refugee Agency as a shelter in the city of Khan Yunis in the southern Gaza Strip (Haifa School airstrike). Wael Al-Dahdouh, Al Jazeera's Gaza bureau chief, was also injured in his hand and stomach, but was able to withdraw on foot. Samer, however, was unable to withdraw after his injury and continued to bleed for more than five hours, eventually succumbing to his wounds. During these five hours, Al Jazeera tried to coordinate with the Israeli military. Al Jazeera tried to reach humanitarian organizations to be able to rescue him or try to get him an ambulance. One ambulance that tried to reach Abu Daqqa came under fire. Three Gazan rescue workers were killed.

Abu Daqqa was 45. He was buried on 16 December, after performing Abu Daqqa's funeral prayer in the hospital courtyard, hundreds of Palestinians, including dozens of his journalists colleagues, took part in Abu Daqqa's funeral procession, leaving from Nasser Hospital. His body was buried in the cemetery of the city of Khan Yunis wearing his press vest and helmet in a grave dug by his journalist colleagues. The injured Wael Al-Dahdouh, was in the front row of mourners, alongside the rest of the team.

Al Jazeera Media Network decided to refer the case of the assassination of Samer Abu Daqqa, to the International Criminal Court (ICC) − which presides over war crimes − “urgently”. Speaking from Belgium, his son, Yazan Abu Daqqa, also said that the family would be filing a case with the ICC.

Al Jazeera told it held "Israel accountable for systematically targeting and killing Al Jazeera journalists and their families." Palestinian UN Ambassador Riyad Mansour stated in a General Assembly meeting on the war that Israel “targets those who could document (their) crimes and inform the world, the journalists. Before Abu Daqqa's death, 64 media practitioners have been killed since the start of the Gaza war, according to the Committee to Protect Journalists. According to Al Jazeera, with Abu Daqqa's death, the number of journalists and media workers killed during Israel's war exceeded 90.

On 22 December, Reporters Without Borders filed a complaint with the International Criminal Court over the killing of seven Palestinian journalists, including Abu Daqqa.
