= Gaza Soup Kitchen =

Organization providing food for Palestinians in Gaza

- Formation: 2024
- Founder: Hani Almadhoun, Mahmoud Almadhoun
- Purpose: To feed Palestinians in Gaza
- Headquarters: Gaza
- Website: https://gazasoupkitchen.org/

Gaza Soup Kitchen is a grassroots organization that was established in Beit Lahia, Gaza, to provide food for Palestinians at risk of famine during the Gaza war. Founded in early 2024 by brothers Hani and Mahmoud Almadhoun, Mahmoud coordinated activities on the ground while Hani supported the organization from the United States through online fundraising.

In April 2024, they reported serving 3,000 people a day, but their operations in later months have been severely impacted by the Israeli blockade on Gaza. On November 30, 2024, the Gaza Soup Kitchen announced that Mahmoud had been killed in an Israeli drone strike that morning.

== Background ==
The Gaza Soup Kitchen was co-founded by brothers Hani Almadhoun and Mahmoud Almadhoun. Hani, the director of philanthropy for UNRWA USA, lives in Virginia, while much of his family lives in Beit Lahia. Hani reached out to U.S. officials regarding the lack of food in Gaza but was dissatisfied with their response. He became increasingly concerned in December 2023, after learning that Palestinians like his sister Samah were making bread from animal feed.

Previously, Mahmoud sold mobile phones, but the Israel Defense Forces (IDF) bombed his shop. In December 2023, Mahmoud and three other male relatives were detained by the Israel Defense Forces in Gaza. Hani recognized him in photos of blindfolded men held by the IDF. After Hani spoke about Mahmoud's detainment to the US media and on social media, Mahmoud was released. In an op-ed for The Washington Post, Mahmoud recounted being: "stripped to my underwear and paraded with other blindfolded men in the cold like circus animals" and wrote that none of the detained men were militants. He also told PBS that the experience inspired him to help others.

Mahmoud and Hani have lost at least 150 family members in the war, including their brother Majed, his wife, and their four children.

== History ==
=== 2024 ===
In early 2024, Mahmoud and Hani started the Gaza Soup Kitchen in Beit Lahia. On its first day, the soup kitchen fed 150 families, increasing to as many as 3,000 people a day by April 2024. To support their efforts, Hani created a GoFundMe campaign, raising $2 million by December 2024. He transfers the funds with difficulty due to Gaza's damaged financial infrastructure.

Mahmoud, the head chef until he was killed in an Israeli drone strike, was assisted by his relatives, including his mother and sister Faten. To obtain ingredients, the Gaza Soup Kitchen barters, forages, or purchases food at high cost. Searching for food in Gaza is dangerous; Mahmoud reported being shot at while trying to acquire ingredients. Most of the meals are vegetarian and include foods like zucchini, potatoes, lentils, or khubeza. Due to the lack of fuel, meals are prepared over a wood fire.

Mahmoud told reporters that families come to the soup kitchen in the morning to wait in line for food distribution in the evening. For many people, the soup kitchen is their only source of food. In addition to providing food, Hani has said that the Gaza Soup Kitchen helps to improve the mental wellbeing of the people it serves.

In March, the Gaza Soup Kitchen reported that they had started providing food to the Kamal Adwan Hospital. The same month, they opened another location in Rafah, run by Hani and Mahmoud's sister, Niveen. The kitchen was later closed due to Israel's Rafah offensive.

The Washington Post published an op-ed by Mahmoud in April, in which he wrote that he would feed his neighbors for as long as possible. He stated: "We will keep serving our community, remembering that when all else has failed the Palestinians, the land did not".

In September, the Gaza Soup Kitchen opened a school for local children in Beit Lahia. Because many school buildings have been destroyed in Israeli airstrikes or repurposed as refugee camps, the Gaza Soup Kitchen school was located in a commercial building. On the roof, they placed a sign that said: "School. Please Don't Bomb" in Hebrew and English. On November 3, the IDF attacked the building, leaving a hole in the ceiling and destroying the furniture inside.

In October, Israel began the siege of North Gaza, which has killed or wounded over 13,000 Palestinians according to Gaza officials. The United Nations and U.S. officials have stated that not enough aid has been entering North Gaza during the siege. By November, the Gaza Soup Kitchen was unable to serve many of the families who needed food.

After an Israel drone strike killed Mahmoud in November, the Gaza Soup Kitchen has continued operating. As of December 2024, the Gaza Soup Kitchen has about 45 staff working at multiple locations in the North and the South.

=== 2025 ===
In March 2025, the Israeli blockade of the Gaza Strip escalated, preventing all food and aid from entering Gaza and increasing the humanitarian crisis there. By April, Hani reported that Gaza Soup Kitchen's supplies were seriously depleted and would run out in a few weeks. Lacking fresh food, they primarily served pasta, rice, and canned meat. He estimated that they were only able to feed about 80% of people who came for meals.

== Killing of Mahmoud Almadhoun ==
=== November 2024 ===
On November 30, 2024, the Gaza Soup Kitchen announced that the IDF had killed Mahmoud in a drone strike that morning. An eyewitness reported that he and Mahmoud were on their way to deliver aid to Kamal Adwan Hospital when an IDF drone attacked Mahmoud. The eyewitness attempted to take Mahmoud to the hospital, but they were shot at. Mahmoud is survived by his wife and their seven children, including a newborn and another child injured by an Israeli quadcopter.

Aid workers from World Central Kitchen (WCK) and Save the Children were also killed by Israel that day.

=== Reactions ===
In a statement on social media, the Gaza Soup Kitchen wrote that Mahmoud was "targeted and assassinated" and: "killed because of his unwavering dedication to solving problems for Kamal Adwan Hospital and ensuring they had whatever they needed". Hani stated: "My brother slowed down the ethnic cleansing of north Gaza, and that’s why he was taken out".

UNRWA USA, New York City (NYC) restaurant chain Ayat, and Laila el-Haddad have paid tribute to Mahmoud on social media. Other pieces honoring Mahmoud have been published by The Nation, Al-Jazeera, and The Forward.

== See also ==
- Timeline of the Israeli–Palestinian conflict in 2024
- Gaza Strip famine
- Siege of North Gaza
- Gaza genocide
