= Ayat Khadoura =

Palestinian journalist (1996–2023)

- آيات خضورة
- Born: Beit Lahia, Palestine
- Died: 20 November 2023; Beit Lahia, Palestine
- Education: Al-Quds Open University
- Occupation: Journalist

Ayat Khadoura (Arabic: آيات خضورة) was a Palestinian freelance journalist, podcaster and an activist on Instagram. She was killed during the Gaza genocide, along with members of her family, when an Israeli strike targeted her home in Beit Lahia on the 20th of November 2023. Over 200 journalists and media workers have been killed since Israel's war on Gaza began on October 7, 2023.

== Early life and education ==
Khadoura was born in Beit Lahia, in the north of the Gaza Strip. She held a bachelor's degree in digital media from Al-Quds Open University.

== Online presence ==
Khadoura used her platform to spread information about the situation in Gaza. During the Israeli bombardments, she gained international recognition for her videos, documenting people's struggles to find food and other basic necessities, as well as their mourning for lost loved ones. Since her death, family members have continued to use her social media platform to share the latest news and memorialise her work. She has over 200 thousand followers on Instagram.

Khadoura's sister Yasmin said that "Ayat aspired to become a big journalist, to study further, to get filming equipment. So many things."

With Gaza under siege, professional and non-professional journalists use social media to inform the outside world about the realities of life in the territory, and independent reporting has taken on a more significant role. Since October 7, journalists have been under more strain than ever, targeted from within Israel by smear campaigns, threats and accusations of working for Hamas. Since the start of the current wave of violence, over 200 journalists and media workers have been killed by Israeli forces, whilst many more have been injured or imprisoned.

== Death ==
On the 20th of November 2023, Khadoura was killed along with her grandmother and three of her siblings in an Israeli strike on her home in Beit Lahia.

On the 6th of November 2023, Khadoura had shared a video on Instagram that she called "My last message to the world." In it she said, "We had big dreams, but our dream now is to be killed in one piece so they know who we are." She also expressed her terror at the use of white phosphorus and thermobaric bombs in her area.

According to relatives Khadoura's body could not be buried; it was blown to pieces in the explosion.

== Response ==
There have been reports that journalists have been deliberately targeted in Gaza.

On the 14th of December 2023, UNESCO Director-General Audrey Azoulay expressed her outrage at the death of Khadoura. She stated: "The protection of journalists as civilians is a requirement under international law, including UN Security Council Resolution 2222/2015 on the protection of journalists, media professionals and associated personnel in situations of conflict." Azoulay then called for a "full and transparent investigation to determine the circumstances of this tragedy."

On the 26th of January 2024, the UN Special Rapporteur on the situation of human rights defenders, Mary Lawlor, described the vital work of local journalists in Gaza, given that international journalists are only allowed to report if "embedded with the Israeli army." Although she was not associated with a particular news outlet, Khadoura, and others like her, played an important role in getting information out of Gaza.

Tariq Ahmad, Baron Ahmad of Wimbledon condemned attacks on all media workers on X (formerly known as Twitter), stressing the importance that they be protected.

On the 1st of February 2024, the U.N. Human Rights Council expressed their alarm over attacks against media workers in identifiable press insignia. They stated that these attacks indicate a "deliberate strategy" by Israeli forces to obstruct and silence critical reporting.
