= Attacks on refugee camps in the Gaza war =

Airstrikes in the Gaza Strip and West Bank

In the Gaza war, as part of the bombing and invasion of Gaza, the Israel Defense Forces (IDF) has conducted numerous airstrikes in densely populated Palestinian refugee camps in both the Gaza Strip and West Bank.

== Gaza Strip ==
=== Al-Mawasi ===
On 4 December 2024, the Israeli Air Force executed two sequential strikes on al-Mawasi beginning prior to 19:20 PSST. The attacks ignited numerous makeshift tents housing displaced civilians, prompting immediate responses from Palestinian Civil Defence crews who attempted to control the fires while conducting rescue operations. Many displaced civilians were still in their tents when the resulting fire began to spread.

The death toll progressively increased throughout the afternoon. Initial reports indicated 20 fatalities, with Civil Defense spokespersons confirming that children were among the victims. The attacks also resulted in dozens of injuries, with medical teams being overwhelmed in treating severely wounded survivors due to limited medical resources and insufficient staff. As a result, many initial survivors died due to severe burns or from severe injuries caused by the explosions.

The attacks caused severe damage to a wide array of refugee shelters and accommodations, with many being completely destroyed.

=== Jabaliya ===
==== 9–22 October ====
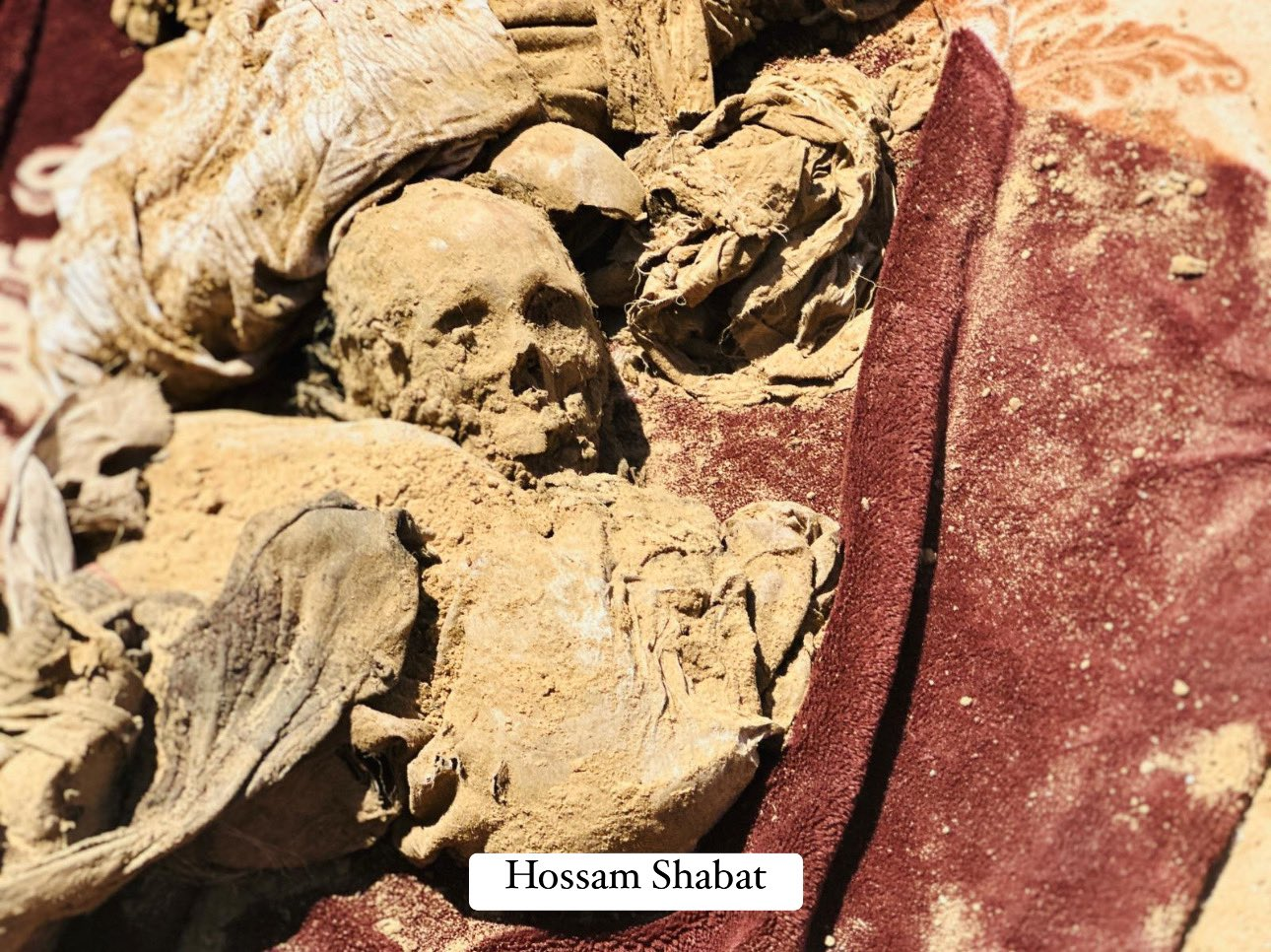
Mass graves found in Jabalia camp

Following Israeli airstrikes on other areas of Gaza, internally displaced Gazans fled to the Jabaliya camp. At the time of the attack, the market was full, with customers and vendors stocking up on goods. The airstrike hit the al-Trans area of the Jabalia market, one of the most populated areas of Jabaliya. Survivors of the attack, speaking to France 24, stated that the airstrike "hit in the heart of the market", and in the immediate aftermath, there were many dead. Many of the bodies were unable to be recovered in the days following the airstrike, due to a lack of equipment.

A rescue worker speaking to the New York Times stated that the death toll was over sixty, and the entire market and surrounding buildings were destroyed. Gaza's health ministry declined to give a full estimate, but reported "dozens" of dead and wounded. Gaza's interior ministry also claimed that the airstrike initially targeted a residential building belonging to the Abu Eshkayyah family.

The Israeli government claimed that the Jabalia airstrike targeted elements of Hamas located in a mosque in the Jabalia camp. Amnesty International investigated the airstrike in its report on the Gaza genocide. The report said there was no evidence of a military objective and that the "Israeli military made contradictory remarks and failed to substantiate them." The Amnesty report concluded the strike was a likely war crime.

On 12 October, a second airstrike on the Jabalia camp hit a residential building, destroying several apartments, and killing people from two families. Gaza's Interior Ministry reported 45 people were killed, and at least four others injured. Some were sheltering there after being displaced from Beit Hanoun.

On 19 October, the camp was hit by a third airstrike, killing 18 refugees. On 22 October, the camp was bombed for a fourth time during a particularly intense bombardment of Gaza. Multiple homes were bombed and at least 30 bodies have been recovered from the rubble.

==== 31 October ====
On 31 October, the camp was bombed again by Israeli fighter jets. The IDF said the attack was meant to target a key leader of the 7 October attacks Ibrahim Biari, as well as a "vast underground tunnel complex" beneath the camp that according to the IDF Biari was commanding operations from. Hamas denied the presence of any commander and said Israel was using these claims as an excuse for the attack.

An eyewitness interviewed by CNN spoke of "apocalyptic scenes":

"Children were carrying other injured children and running, with grey dust filling the air. Bodies were hanging on the rubble, many of them unrecognized. Some were bleeding and others were burnt. ... I saw women screaming and confused. They didn't know whether to cry for losing their children or run and look for them, especially since many children were playing in the neighborhood."

Atef Abu Seif, Minister of Culture of the Palestinian Authority of President Mahmoud Abbas and a well-known critic of Hamas, likewise spoke of "apocalyptic" scenes to Der Spiegel, saying more than 50 houses were "smashed, crushed. In each house there were dozens of people, families and relatives who had fled here from outside because their areas were bombed ... They bombed the center, the heart of the refugee camp. No place in all of Palestine is probably as densely populated as this. Now we can't even make out where which building began and ended."

Al Jazeera reporter Anas Al Shareef was on the scene, stating, "It's a massive massacre. It is hard to count the number of buildings that have been destroyed here." Nebal Farsakh, a spokesperson for the Palestinian Red Crescent, described the scene as "absolutely horrific". More than a hundred people were reported missing beneath the rubble. The Gaza Interior Ministry stated the camp had been "completely destroyed", with preliminary estimates of about 400 wounded or dead. The director of the Indonesia Hospital reported more than 50 dead.

IDF spokesperson Daniel Hagari confirmed that Israeli fighter jets attacked the refugee camp. IDF spokesman Richard Hecht described civilian deaths as a tragic consequence of war and accused Hamas of using the local population as human shields, noting that civilians had been warned to move south.

==== 1–2 November ====
Less than a day after the 31 October airstrike which killed at least 50 people, Jabalia was bombed again. The Civil Defense in Gaza described the airstrike as a "second massacre" which destroyed several buildings surrounding the camp and killed at least 80 people and wounded hundreds more. The IDF said the strike killed "the head of [Hamas's] anti-tank missile unit, Muhammad A'sar".

On 2 November, another airstrike in the Jabalia refugee camp hit the UNRWA-sponsored Abu Hussein school, home to many displaced Gazans.

==== Al-Fakhoora school ====
External videos
- Gazan child speaks of having to carry decapitated body after Israeli strike on Jabalia on 4 November (via The Irish Times)

On 4 November, a UNRWA spokeswoman confirmed reports that Israel had conducted another airstrike against a UN-run school in the Jabalia refugee camp. According to the Gaza health ministry, the attack on the Al-Fakhoura school killed fifteen and wounded dozens more. Reuters reported having obtained a video of a boy crying in despair: "I was standing here when three bombings happened, I carried a body and another decapitated body with my own hands. God will take my vengeance." According to UNRWA, at least one strike hit the schoolyard where displaced families had set up their tents. In response to the strike, Al Jazeera remarked Israel was "trying to eliminate all sources of survival for the civilian population to force the evacuation to the southern part of Gaza."

A second airstrike on the school occurred in the early hours of the morning on 18 November. Journalists on the scene reported dead bodies everywhere, suggesting the strike may have been an Israeli message to civilians to flee to the southern Gaza Strip. The second strike killed at least 50 people. A video clip surfacing following what has been described as a "massacre" depicts a man walking through several rooms where dozens of corpses can be seen, and distress can be heard throughout the school.

==== 13–23 November ====
On 13 November, Israel bombed the camp, destroying twelve houses and killing more than 30 people. The civil defence team reported being unable to rescue injured people from the rubble due to a lack of equipment. On 14 November, Israeli airstrikes killed volleyball players Hassan Zuaiter and Ibrahim Qusaya at the camp. On 17 November, Israel hit several residential buildings, killing and wounding an unknown number. Residents and rescue workers reportedly used axes, hammers, and their bare hands to try to find survivors. On 23 November, an Israeli airstrike on the Abu Hussein School killed at least 27 people, according to the Gaza Health Ministry.

==== December ====
On 5 December, the IDF stated they had the entire Jabalia camp surrounded. On 6 December, airstrikes on the camp reportedly intensified.

=== Al-Shati ===
==== 2023 ====
On 9 October 2023, during the Gaza war, the Israel Defense Forces conducted an airstrike on al-Shati refugee camp in the Gaza Strip, destroying four mosques. According to Palestinian media, the attack killed people inside. The camp is Gaza's third-largest refugee camp, with a population of more than 90,000 refugees. A second strike was conducted on 12 October, killing 13 people.

The al-Gharbi mosque, Yassin mosque, and al-Sousi mosque were totally destroyed according to satellite footage, with local news reporting an unspecified number of people killed inside. The Palestinian Ministry of Health described the situation as "a massacre".

==== 2024 ====
Ten people were killed in an airstrike on 29 January. Two people were killed and four wounded in an airstrike on 24 February. By 6 March 2024, aerial footage showed that the Shati camp, which had been one of the world's most densely populated areas before the war, was in complete ruins. Several casualties were reported following an Israeli bombing of the camp on 22 March. Wafa reported at least four people were killed by an Israeli attack on 18 April. The government media office stated 24 were killed by an air raid on 22 June 2024. An Israeli drone strike killed five children on 13 October 2024, according to Gaza's civil defence agency. On 19 October 2024, an Israeli airstrike killed at least 73 people at the Asmaa School, according to Gaza's Civil Defense. On 7 November, an Israeli airstrike targeted a school for displaced people, killing 12 people. On 16 November, 10 people were killed and at least 20 others were injured by an Israeli strike on a UN-run school. On 16 December, five Palestinian civilians were killed and 15 others were injured by an Israeli airstrike. On 20 December, another Israeli airstrike killed at least 10 people.

==== 2025 ====
On 15 January 2025, three Palestinians were killed by an Israeli airstrike. On 1 April, three Palestinian civilians were killed and several others injured by an Israeli airstrike.

On 19 June, an Israeli drone attacked a makeshift tent at the camp, killing at least 13 Palestinians. On 9 July, ten people, including two children, were killed and at least 30 others were injured when Israeli forces attacked the Jouda family home in west of the refugee camp. On 12 July, at 11 people were killed and more than 40 others were injured by Israeli attacks in Al-Balakhia, west of the refugee camp. On 15 July, nine people including five children were killed while 25 others were injured in an Israeli airstrike. On 22 July, Israeli forces targeted tents in the refugee camp, killing 16 people and injuring more than 25 others. On 7 August, three people were killed after Israeli forces targeted a residential apartment. On 6 September, six people were killed in an Israeli attack on a house in the camp. On 27 September, four people were killed by an Israeli airstrike.

=== Al-Bureij ===
==== October – December 2023 ====
An airstrike by Israeli forces on the Al-Bureij refugee camp on 17 October 2023 killed at least 12 people and injured dozens.

On 2 November 2023, a residential building in the camp was bombed, killing 15 people. On 5 November 2023, residential structures in the camp were bombed again, killing at least 20 people.

A drone bombing killed two people on 22 December. Four were killed in a 23 December bombing.

==== January – May 2024 ====
Attacks reported intensified on 5 January 2024. A bombing on 1 March killed four people. An airstrike on 14 March killed nine people from a single family. At least two people were killed by an Israeli airstrike on 27 March, with the Palestinian Red Crescent stating it had recovered one body and three wounded people. Local media reported an Israeli strike killed four people on 31 May 2024.

==== June – December 2024 ====
Three people were reportedly killed by an airstrike on 3 June 2024. The camp underwent "constant bombardment" in June. Six people were killed by an Israeli bombing on 8 June. Nine people were killed by an Israeli strike on the camp on 16 June. Nine people, including five children, were reportedly killed in an Israeli attack on 9 July. In July 2024, nine men were reportedly killed while attempting to transport the deceased from Al-Bureij to Nuseirat. On 8 August, at least 12 people, including children were killed when an Israeli fighter jet targeted a home in the camp. On 10 September, a Palestinian was killed and several others were injured by an Israeli airstrike. On 8 October, at least 17 people were killed by an Israeli airstrike. Five people were reportedly killed by an Israeli drone attack in 2 November. On 17 November, at least eight people, including a child were killed by Israeli airstrikes.

==== January – June 2025 ====
On 4 January 2025, four people were killed and dozens were injured when Israeli forces targeted the Abu Helou School that houses displaced Palestinians. On 21 April, one Palestinian was killed and five others were injured in an Israeli airstrike on the camp. On 2 May 2025, at least nine Palestinians were killed by an Israeli airstrike. On 6 May, 49 people were killed and dozens were injured when Israeli airstrikes struck Abu Hamisa and Al-Karama schools for displaced persons at the camp. On 29 May, at least 23 people were killed by Israeli attacks on residential buildings in the camp.

==== July 2025 – present ====
On 14 July, at least four people were killed when Israeli forces targeted a commercial centre of the camp, according to Wafa. On 20 September, eight people were killed by an Israeli strike in front of a clinic in the camp. On 2 December, a Palestinian man was killed by Israeli gunfire in the eastern part of the camp, according to Al-Awda Hospital.

=== Al-Maghazi ===
==== 17 October (UNRWA school) ====
On 17 October 2023, an airstrike conducted by Israel Defense Forces struck a United Nations Relief and Works Agency for Palestine Refugees in the Near East (UNRWA) school in the Al-Maghazi refugee camp in the Gaza Strip. Six people were killed by the airstrike. The UNRWA said that at least 4,000 people had taken refuge in the school since the start of the Gaza war. On 22 October, UNRWA confirmed that 29 of their staff had been killed since 7 October, half of whom were UNRWA teachers. The agency further added that as of 21 October nearly 180 civilians sheltering at UNRWA schools had been injured and 12 had been killed, while 38 UNRWA installations had been impacted by strikes since 7 October.

==== 5 November ====
On 5 November 2023, during the Israeli invasion of the Gaza Strip, the Israel Defense Forces conducted an airstrike in the al-Maghazi refugee camp in the central Gaza Strip. According to the Gaza Health Ministry, at least 45 people were killed, who were mostly women and children. The IDF did not confirm that the camp had been hit with an Israeli airstrike and said its airstrikes were "specific intelligence-based strikes, specifically against terrorist elements". The airstrike caused severe damage to neighboring homes and infrastructure. The Gaza Health Ministry stated that more than 30 dead people arrived in Al-Aqsa Martyrs Hospital in Deir Al-Balah following the airstrike.

==== 6 December ====
On 6 December 18 were killed in an Israeli airstrike, with many believed to still be buried under rubble.

==== 24 and 25 December ====
70 people were reportedly killed after Israeli airstrikes. A survivor of the attack described it as a "complete and real extermination" of the residential area. People searched for the wounded with their bare hands. The wounded were transported to the nearest hospital by wooden cart. By 25 December, the death toll had risen to 106. Seven families were taken off the civil registry after the attack, meaning every single person in that family had been killed. Residents stated they were given no evacuation orders or warning notice. On 28 December, the IDF stated the death toll was so high because they had used the "wrong type of munition." Residents continued trying to dig up victims four days after the initial strike.

==== 28 December ====
At least 70 people were killed after an airstrike on 28 December.

==== 9 January 2024 ====
Massive strikes were reported on 9 January with Al Jazeera journalist Hani Mahmoud stating, "People are trapped in this small strip of land and waiting to die."

=== Nuseirat ===
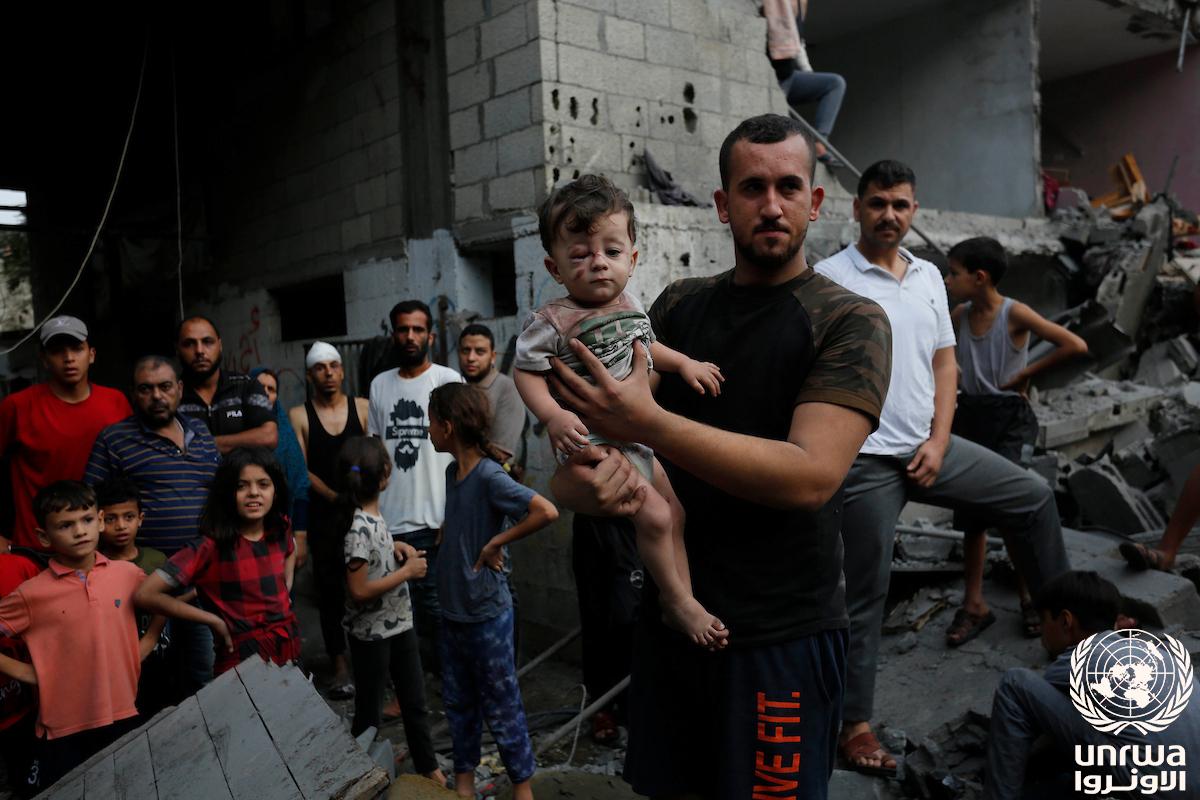
A Palestinian father with his child who was injured during Israeli shelling of Nuseirat Camp in October 2023

The Nuseirat refugee camp has been bombed repeatedly.

==== October – December 2023 ====
On 18 October 2023, the Grand Nuseirat Mosque was bombed and destroyed by Israeli airstrikes, killing at least 30.

On 4 November, four Palestinians were killed by an airstrike. An airstrike on 17 November was the third such strike on the area, and killed 18 people. On 21 November, Israeli forces bombed the camp again, targeting homes including those of a nurse and civil defense staff, killing at least 20 people.

On 3 December, at least thirteen were killed in an airstrike. At least ten were reported killed in an airstrike on 5 December. Six were reported killed in an airstrike on 6 December. Several people were reported killed on 18 December. On 17 or 18 December, karateka Nagham Abu Samra was injured in an Israeli airstrike that also killed her sister Roseanne. She later died. Multiple people were reported killed after a bombing on 21 December. Israel bombed a house on 22 December with 52 family members inside, of whom 18 died. As many as twenty were reported killed following an airstrike on 29 December.

==== January 2024 ====
Two died in an airstrike on 3 January 2024. A bombing on 4 January killed five people. An airstrike on 13 January killed multiple people. Seven people are killed in an airstrike on 19 January. Four people were killed on 20 January. On 24 January 2024 four children were killed in Israeli strikes targeting a residential square in the Nuseirat refugee camp. Israeli bombing destroyed a residential building in the al-Hassayna neighborhood on 25 January. Four children were reportedly killed. Eleven people were killed in an airstrike on 26 January. An unknown number of people were killed after an Israeli airstrike on a residential building on 28 January.

==== February 2024 ====
Five people were killed on 13 February, including artist Alaa Qadouha. 12 people were killed by strikes on 15 February, including several children. Three people were reportedly killed by strikes on 20 February. A kamikaze drone reportedly killed and wounded several people on 21 February. Seventeen people were killed on 22 February. Several people were reported killed on 28 February.

==== March 2024 ====
A strike on 3 March wounded more than 40 people and ten people killed. Al Jazeera released a photo series of people wounded by a 5 March Israeli airstrike. Ten people were killed following an airstrike on a residential block on 9 March. The death count was revised to 13, with one survivor stating, "There is nothing called the international court or international humanitarian law. All of these are just lies. All these names were created to back the strong against the weak; the oppressor against the oppressed." Eight people were killed in an attack on an aid warehouse on 14 March. Wounded people, including children, were taken to the Al-Aqsa Hospital following an Israeli airstrike on 15 March.

36 people were killed in an airstrike overnight on 16 March, with seven killed in another airstrike in the morning. Two were killed in an airstrike on 17 March. Nine were killed in an airstrike on 18 March. At least 27 people were killed in an attack on 19 March. Nine people were killed in an airstrike on 21 March.

==== April 2024 ====
Video verified by Al Jazeera English showed recordings of "the sounds of children crying" seeming to come from an Israeli quadcopter plane, with residents stating it was an attempt to "lure civilians and kill them". On 21 April 2024, seven civilians were reported killed by an Israeli air raid. On 24 April, four people were reportedly killed by a bombing near a school in the camp. Three people were reportedly killed by an airstrike on 27 April. At least six Palestinians have been reported killed, including four children on 3 May. In late-April, witnesses again stated the IDF was "using drones that release the sounds of children and women calling for help. When people attempt to rescue them, they are attacked."

==== May 2024 ====
20 people were reportedly killed by an Israeli attack on 14 May. The Palestinian Civil Defence stated 31 people were killed by an Israeli airstrike on 19 May. 10 people were reported killed by a bomb on 22 May. Eight were reportedly killed by an Israeli bombing on 23 May. Four people were reportedly killed on 25 May. Three Gaza police officers were killed in an air raid on 26 May. Local media reported three people were killed in an apparently targeted airstrike on 31 May.

==== June 2024 ====
Four people were killed by an airstrike on 2 June. On 6 June, an Israeli airstrike in the Nuseirat refugee camp hit the UNRWA-run al-Sardi school that was sheltering displaced Palestinian refugees, killing more than 30 people, including 23 women and children. On 8 June, at least 276 Palestinians were killed and more than 600 others were injured when Israeli forces conducted an operation to rescue four Israeli hostages, Noa Argamani, Shlomi Ziv, Almog Meir Jan, and Andrey Kozlov. On 18 June, 17 people were killed in strikes on both Nuseirat and Bureij camps.

==== July 2024 ====
On 6 July, at least 16 people were killed by an Israeli airstrike on the Al-Jaouni school at the camp. Eight people were killed by an Israeli bombs on 19 July. At least thirteen people were killed on 20 July by Israeli airstrikes on Nuseirat and the Bureij refugee camp. On 21 July, the Gaza government media office stated Israel had bombed Nuseirat 63 times in seven days. A strike on Nuseirat on 30 July 2024 reportedly killed twelve people.

==== August 2024 ====
A Palestinian woman was killed and several others were injured when an Israeli airstrike targeted a home in the camp on 11 August.

==== September 2024 ====
On 3 September, two people, including a child, were killed after Israeli forces launched strikes on the camp. On 11 September, Israeli forces bombed al-Jaouni school at the camp, killing at least 18 people, including the shelter manager and five UNRWA staff. On 16 September, at least 10 people were killed and 13 others were injured by Israeli attacks. On 27 September, two people were killed and 11 others were injured when an Israeli airstrike hit a home in the camp.

==== October 2024 ====
13 people were reportedly killed by airstrikes on two houses in October 2024. On 24 October 2024, an Israeli airstrike killed at least 17 people at the Al-Shuhada school, according to hospital officials.

==== November 2024 ====
14 people were reportedly killed by attacks on 1 November 2024. Health authorities stated a total of 30 people had been killed by airstrikes on 1 November. 5 people were reportedly killed the next day. On 10 November, at least three Palestinians were killed and 24 others were wounded from an Israeli airstrike. On 20 November, three people were killed when an Israeli airstrike hit the home of Al-Da'alsa family in the camp. On 28 November, nine members of a family were killed by Israel.

==== December 2024 ====
On 7 December, 26 Palestinians were killed and more than 60 others were injured when Israeli forces attacked the camp. On 12 December, at least 33 Palestinians were killed while 84 others were injured by an Israeli airstrike. On 20 December, at least 25 Palestinians were killed by Israeli airstrikes, including seven children. On 23 December, five people were killed by Israeli forces.

==== January – February 2025 ====
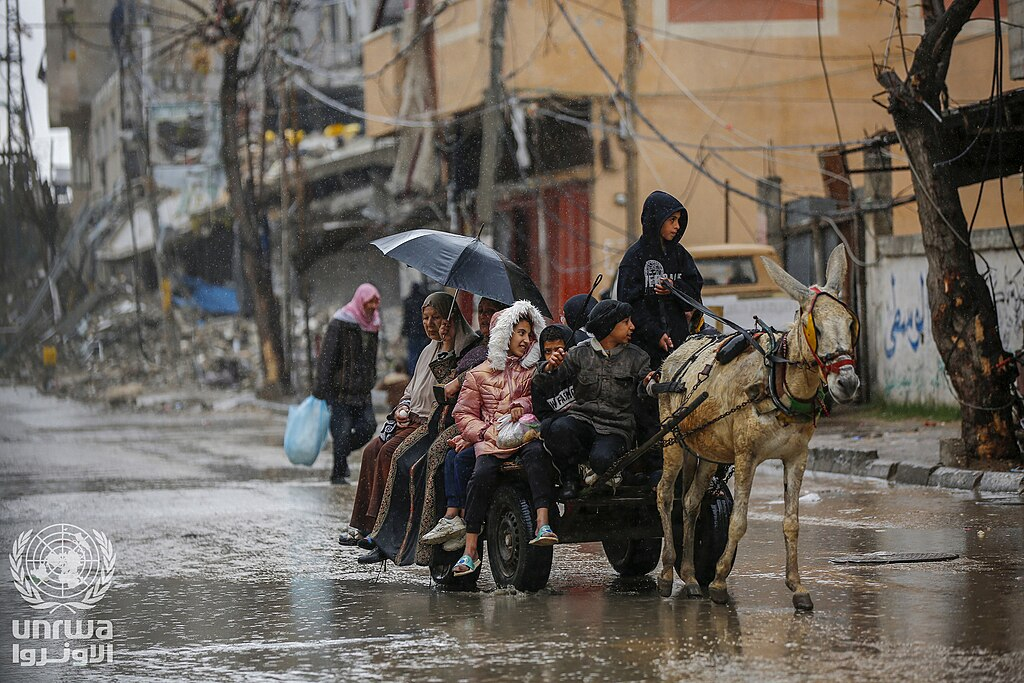
Displaced Palestinians continue to return to their homes destroyed by Israeli airstrikes in Nuseirat Camp.

On 9 January 2025, a father and his three daughters were killed by Israeli airstrikes. On 27 January, a five-year-old child was killed and three others were injured by Israeli attacks despite the ceasefire. On 2 February, despite the ceasefire, a child was killed and five others were injured in an Israeli airstrike.

==== March – April 2025 ====
On 24 March, five people were killed and 13 others were injured by Israeli forces at the al-Razi school in the camp. On 26 March, four people were killed by an Israeli airstrike near a mosque.

On 19 April, one person was killed by an Israeli airstrike at his home near al-Uruba school in the camp. On 29 April, two Palestinians including a child, were killed on the Ain Jalut towers in the camp from an Israeli airstrike.

==== May – June 2025 ====
On 4 May, an Israeli airstrike hit the Abu Hweishel family home in the camp, killing two Palestinians, including a woman and injured several others. On 19 May, at least five people were killed and several others were injured, including children, when Israeli airstrikes targeted Al-Hasayna School, a school-turned-humanitarian-shelter in the camp. On 20 May, 15 people were killed in an airstrike at a gas station near the camp. On 25 May, three people including, a woman who was seven months pregnant, operations director of Gaza's Civil Defence, Ashraf Abu Nar and his wife were killed by Israeli attacks at the camp.

On 8 June, three people were killed by Israeli shelling. On 15 June, an Israeli airstrike killed at least 11 people in a house at the camp. On 22 June, a husband and wife were killed when an Israeli airstrike targeted an apartment to the north of the camp.

==== July 2025 – present ====
On 4 July, two people were killed and several others were injured when Israeli forces targeted civilians in the Al-Hasayneh area in west Nuseirat. On 7 July, eleven people were killed by Israeli attacks. On 9 July, one person was killed several others were injured in north Nuseirat. On 13 July, at least ten people were killed and 16 others were injured when Israeli forces targeted a water distribution point in the camp. On 19 July, the head of the police force along with 11 of his family members were killed by an Israeli strike. On 29 July, at least 30 Palestinians, including 14 women and 12 children, were killed after Israeli airstrikes targeted central Nuseirat.

On 6 August, Al Jazeera Arabic reported that five Palestinians, including a woman and two children, were killed by an Israeli airstrike. On 30 August, an Israeli airstrike targeted a home in the camp, killing a family of five. On 24 September, a helicopter struck a home in the camp, killing four people. That same day, a Palestinian was killed by an airstrike in northern Nuseirat. That same day, another airstrike killed 12 people and injured 18 others. On 27 September, nine members of the same family were killed by Israeli attacks on their home. On 1 October, Israeli airstrikes killed a husband and his wife.

On 19 October, despite a ceasefire, Israeli forces launched an attack on the refugee camp, killing three Palestinians and injuring several others. On 15 January 2026, an Israeli attack targeted the Al-Khatib family home in the camp, killing two people.

=== Khan Yunis ===
On 27 August 2024, at least four people were killed when Israeli forces attacked the home of the Ziyada family in the Khan Yunis refugee camp. On 6 April 2025, a young girl was killed and several others were injured when Israeli forces bombed a house. On 16 April, two people were killed in a surprise attack by an Israeli drone. On 1 May, Israeli forces targeted the Abu Sahlul family home in the camp, killing eight people. On 3 May, an Israeli airstrike struck the refugee camp, killing 11 Palestinians, including three infants, two one-year-old girls and a month-old child. On 20 May, at least five people were killed by Israeli drone attacks, including three children.

=== Shaboura ===
At least twenty were reported dead on an airstrike on one family's home in the Shaboura refugee camp on 7 December. On 14 December, rescuers dug by hand for survivors after an Israeli airstrike destroyed a building in the camp. On 21 April 2024, three Palestinian civilians were killed in an Israeli raid in the camp. On 30 April, two children, a four-year-old boy, Kareem Jarada and his two-year-old sister, Mona Jarada, were killed when Israeli airstrikes targeted the camp. On 5 January 2025, one person was killed in a drone shelling in the camp.

=== Tel al-Sultan ===
Satellite imagery from the Tel al-Sultan refugee camp showed damage to tents following an Israeli airstrike that reportedly killed at least 45 people on 26 May 2024. On 11 June, three people were killed by Israeli airstrikes on the camp.

== West Bank ==
=== Jenin ===
On 22 October 2023, an airstrike conducted by Israel Defense Forces struck the Al-Ansar Mosque located in the Jenin refugee camp in the West Bank, causing extensive damage to the mosque, killing two people and injuring three more. Three people were reportedly killed in an Israeli airstrike on 20 March 2024. On 14 January 2025, six Palestinians were killed by an Israeli airstrike.

=== Nur Shams ===
At least 6 people were killed in an Israeli bombing of Nur Shams refugee camp on 27 December 2023. An Israeli drone bombed the al-Manshiyya neighborhood in the Nur Shams camp on 20 March 2024. The Palestinian Health Ministry stated four people were killed by an Israeli airstrike on 2 July 2024. On 27 January 2025, two Palestinians were killed in airstrike when Israeli forces targeted a vehicle in the camp.

=== Tulkarem ===
In August 2024, four people were reported killed by an airstrike on Tulkarem. On 3 October 2024, Israel carried out the 2024 Tulkarm Camp airstrike, killing 18.

=== Balata ===
On 4 January 2025, Israeli forces killed a Palestinian teenager and injured nine others during a raid at the Balata Camp, Nablus. On 9 April, 14 Palestinians were injured and dozens more suffocated from tear gas when Israeli forces raided the camp. On 2 May, a Palestinian man was killed by Israeli forces at the camp and confiscated his corpse. Israeli forces also detained an injured man before withdrawing from the camp.

=== Far'a ===
On 19 February 2025, at least three Palestinians were killed in an Israeli raid on a house in Far'a refugee camp. All the three bodies were also later confiscated by Israeli forces.

== Lebanon ==
=== Ain al-Hilweh camp ===
On 1 October 2024, an Israeli airstrike targeted the Ain al-Hilweh camp in Sidon, killing five people. The attack reportedly targeted the home of Munir al-Maqdah, a brigadier general in the Al-Aqsa Martyrs' Brigades, whom he survived. On 18 November 2025, Israeli forces launched an attack on the refugee camp, killing 13 people. The IDF stated that the strike targeted a "Hamas training compound" that was being used to "plan and carry out terrorist attacks against the IDF and the State of Israel." On 20 February 2026, two people were killed by Israel when a drone targeted the Hittin neighbourhood of the camp.

=== Beddawi camp ===
On 5 October 2024, an official of the Hamas's military wing, along with his wife and two daughters, were killed in an airstrike in the Beddawi refugee camp, north of Tripoli.

=== Rashidieh camp ===
On 24 November 2024, several Israeli airstrikes targeted the Rashidieh refugee camp, killing two people and injured 22 others.

== Reactions ==
In response to an Israeli airstrike on the Nuseirat camp on 14 March 2024, the Malaysian Ministry of Foreign Affairs condemned the attack, stating, "This reprehensible act of aggression against innocent civilians underscores the flagrant disregard for human rights and international law by the Israeli authorities". In June 2024, OHCHR condemned several Israeli attacks on refugee camps in Gaza, stating, "These attacks also appear to be disproportionate in that they would be expected to cause incidental loss of civilian life, injury to civilians and damage to civilian objects excessive in relation to the concrete and direct military advantage anticipated."

== See also ==
- Attacks on schools during the Israeli invasion of Gaza
- Attacks on health facilities during the Gaza war
- List of military engagements during the Gaza war
- List of massacres in the Palestinian territories
- Israeli war crimes in the Gaza war
