= 2023 Zorob family airstrike =

Israeli airstrike

- Part of the Gaza war and genocide
- Location within the Gaza Strip
- Location: Rafah, southern Gaza Strip
- Date: 19 December 2023
- Attack type: Airstrike
- Deaths: 22+ Palestinian civilians
- Perpetrator: Israel Defense Forces

On 19 December 2023, the Israeli Air Forces targeted the house of Palestinian journalist Adel Zorob in the Gaza Strip. The airstrike led to the deaths of over 22 civilian victims, from Zorob's family and other families sheltering in the building. Amnesty International found no evidence that any person staying in the house has any connection with an armed group.

== Airstrike and casualties ==
In the evening of Tuesday, December 19, an airstrike targeted the home of Zorob, as well as his family and others sheltering in it at the time. The strike reportedly killed 22 members of the Zorob and Al-Ladda families, including 11 children.

Zorob was a freelance journalist who worked with a number of media outlets including the Hamas-affiliated Al-Aqsa Voice Radio. According to reports, Zorob was "known for his efforts to help wounded children." The Committee to Protect Journalists wrote that "Zorob posted Gaza war news on his Facebook page and on WhatsApp news groups. The last news message was sent directly before his death, according to a WhatsApp screenshot CPJ viewed."

== Reactions ==
The targeting of Zorob has been cited as an instance of the killing of journalists by Israeli forces.

Amnesty International independently confirmed the identities of at least 16 residents injured in the airstrike. They also found no evidence that any person staying in the house directly hit was affiliated with an armed group, and no indication of any military objectives in or near the house.

UNESCO Director-General Audrey Azouley released a statement about Zorob's death on 17 June 2024. "I deplore the death of Adel Zorob and call for a thorough and transparent investigation," she said. "I reiterate my urgent call on all parties to respect UN Security Council Resolution 2222 unanimously adopted in 2015 on the protection of journalists, media professionals and associated personnel as civilians in situations of conflict."
