= Summary executions during the Gaza war =

During the Gaza war there have been a very large number of incidents of deliberate killings of people who were non-combatants. In addition to unarmed civilians, many of the soldiers and militants who were killed - and often reported simply as militants or soldiers, as if they died in combat - were not actively engaging in hostilities at their time of death. There have also been many alleged assassinations, summary executions, deaths in custody, or other extrajudicial killings, with varying amounts of evidence.

== Background ==
=== International law regarding killing unarmed military ===
International law tests state actors and irregular militants equally. Even if an individual is a member of a military or other armed group, there are situations when killing them is a war crime. For example, if they are wounded, if they surrender voluntarily, or if they are already a prisoner of war.

== Executions of alleged informants by Palestinians ==
=== West Bank public executions ===
On Friday 24 November 2023, two Palestinian men were killed by other Palestinians in Tulkarm in the West Bank.

== Killings by Israelis in the West Bank ==
=== Assassination of a wounded militant and his companions in hospital ===
Israeli forces disguised as medical staff and civilian Muslim women have shot dead three Palestinians inside a hospital in the West Bank city of Jenin. The hospital says the men were ‘assassinated’. Israel says they belonged to a ‘Hamas terrorist cell’. The BBC referred to the men who were killed as "members of Palestinian armed groups".

The spokesperson for the hospital, Tawfiq al-Shobaki, said there was no exchange of fire in the hospital, just the assassination of a patient. He also said that all three men who died were asleep at the time of the attack.

According to experts from the United Nations, the killing of three Palestinian men in a hospital in the occupied West Bank by Israeli commandos disguised as medical workers and civilians may amount to war crimes. Unarmed members of the military are allowed to be taken prisoner but not killed. Wounded combatants are further protected under the Geneva Conventions, they are not allowed to be killed or captured, but they may be kept as prisoners of war after they recover if they are treated at enemy hospitals.

== Summary executions ==
OHCHR stated on 20 December it had received allegations of Israeli soldiers summarily killing at least eleven unarmed men in Rimal. Al Jazeera reported that the number summarily executed was 15, killed during an apartment raid. The execution was witnessed by the families of the men. Middlesex University professor William Schabas stated, "It's not really important to demonstrate that they're civilians. Summary executions even of fighters, even of combatants is a war crime." Euro-Med Monitor told Al Jazeera they believe there is a pattern of "systematic" killing, that "In at least 13 of field executions, we corroborated that it was arbitrary on the part of the Israeli forces." On 26 December 2023, Euro-Med Monitor submitted a file to the International Criminal Court and United Nations special rapporteurs documenting dozens of cases of field executions carried out by Israeli forces and calling for an investigation. In March 2024, video of an IDF soldier bragging about killing an elderly deaf man hiding under his bed was released, leading the Council on American-Islamic Relations to condemn the killing as an execution and war crime. The Israeli military stated they would begin a probe into the incident. Defense officials told Haaretz that the Israeli army had created kill zones in Gaza, in which any person who crossed an "invisible line" was killed.

=== Mass graves ===
A mass grave with 283 bodies was uncovered in April 2024 at Khan Younis's Nasser medical complex in the southern Gaza city. 30 bodies were buried in two graves in the courtyard of Al-Shifa Hospital in Gaza City. Reportedly, bodies were found with their hands and feet tied. Following the discovery of the mass graves, UN human rights chief Volker Türk called for an independent investigation on the intentional killing of civilians by the IDF and stated the "intentional killing of civilians, detainees, and others who are hors de combat is a war crime." A spokesperson for the U.N. High Commissioner for Human Rights described the discoveries, stating, "Some of them had their hands tied, which of course indicates serious violations of international human rights law and international humanitarian law, and these need to be subjected to further investigations". William Schabas, a Canadian expert on international human rights law, stated mass graves have "always been an indication that war crimes have been committed".

== See also ==
- War crimes in the Gaza war
- Capital punishment in the Gaza Strip
- List of Israeli assassinations
- Targeted killing
- Extrajudicial killing
- Summary execution
