= Attacks on schools during the Gaza war =

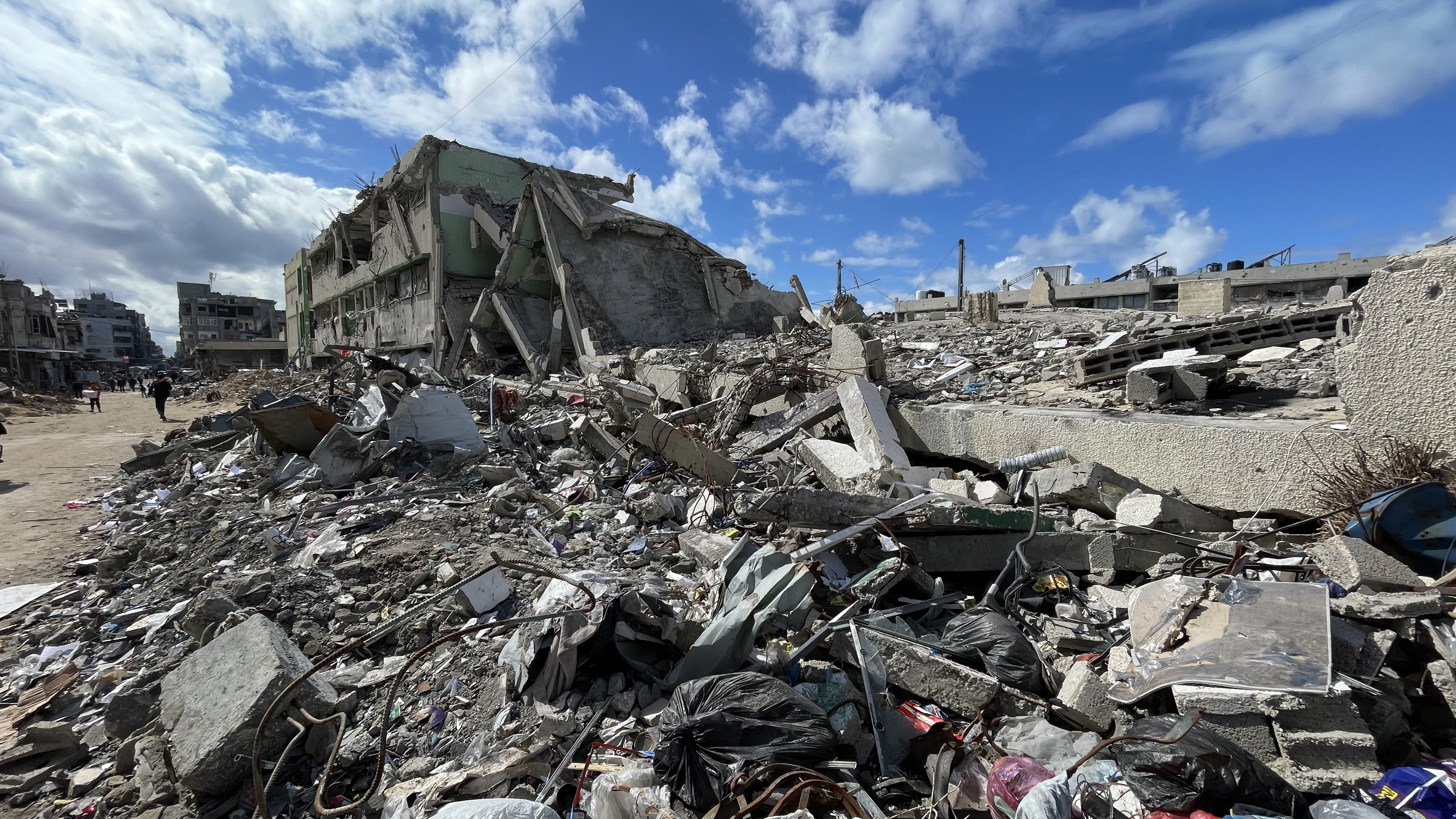
Al-Huda Girls' School in Jabalia, destroyed by Israeli bombing, February 22, 2025

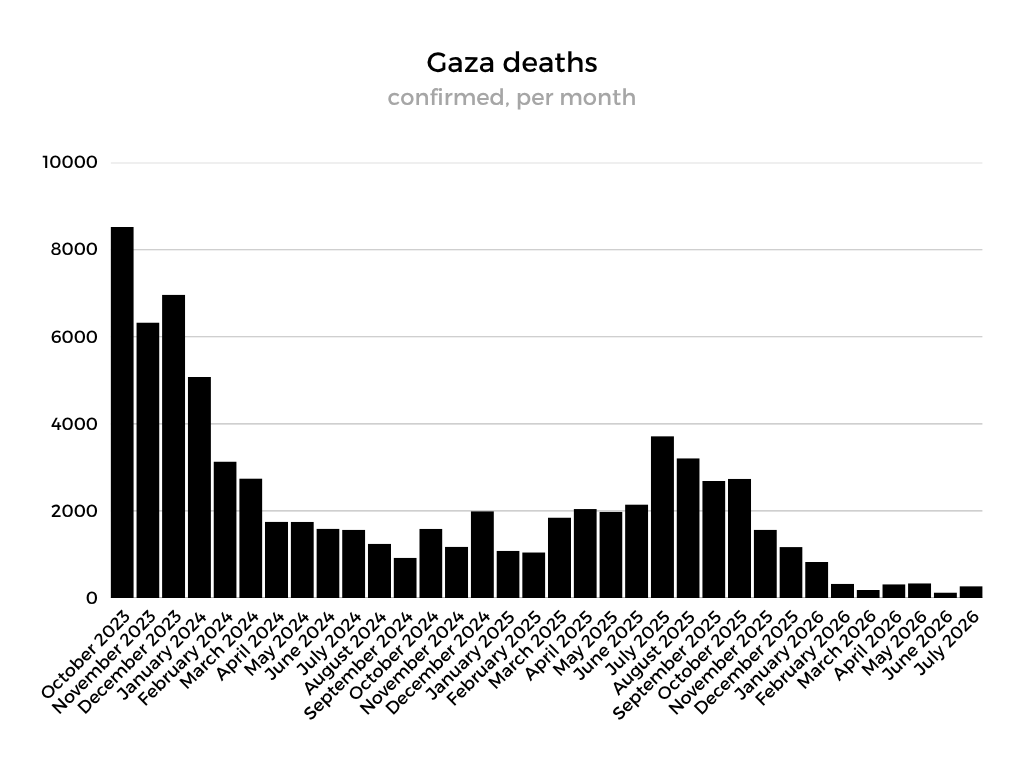
Gaza war deaths by month

Since the outbreak of the Gaza war on 7 October 2023, the Israel Defense Forces (IDF) has conducted attacks (including numerous airstrikes) on more than 200 educational facilities, including universities, in the Gaza Strip.

By late March 2024, the United Nations recorded more than 200 Israeli attacks on schools in Gaza, with at least 53 schools totally destroyed. By July 2024, all 19 Gaza universities had suffered severe damage with 80% of university buildings destroyed, 103 academics killed, and 90,000 students enrolled in higher education no longer able to pursue their studies. In June 2024, UNOCHA stated 76% of Gaza's schools required "full reconstruction or major rehabilitation", and in August 2024, UNICEF stated 564, or 85%, of all schools in Gaza had been hit by Israeli attacks. In May 2025, an estimated 95% of school buildings had been damaged or destroyed.

The IDF states it targets schools because Palestinian militants use them for military purposes. Researchers looking into IDF's claims concluded the claims either lacked evidence, or the evidence presented was misleading. When the IDF destroyed the last university in the Gaza Strip, it destroyed it in a controlled explosion.

Breakdown of deaths by age and gender (analysis by professors Michael Spagat and Daniel Silverman), November 2023
1. Men and boys over 14 (35.3%)
2. Women and girls over 14 (24.1%)
3. Children under 14 (33.8%)
4. Elderly, above 60 (6.80%)

== Attacks ==
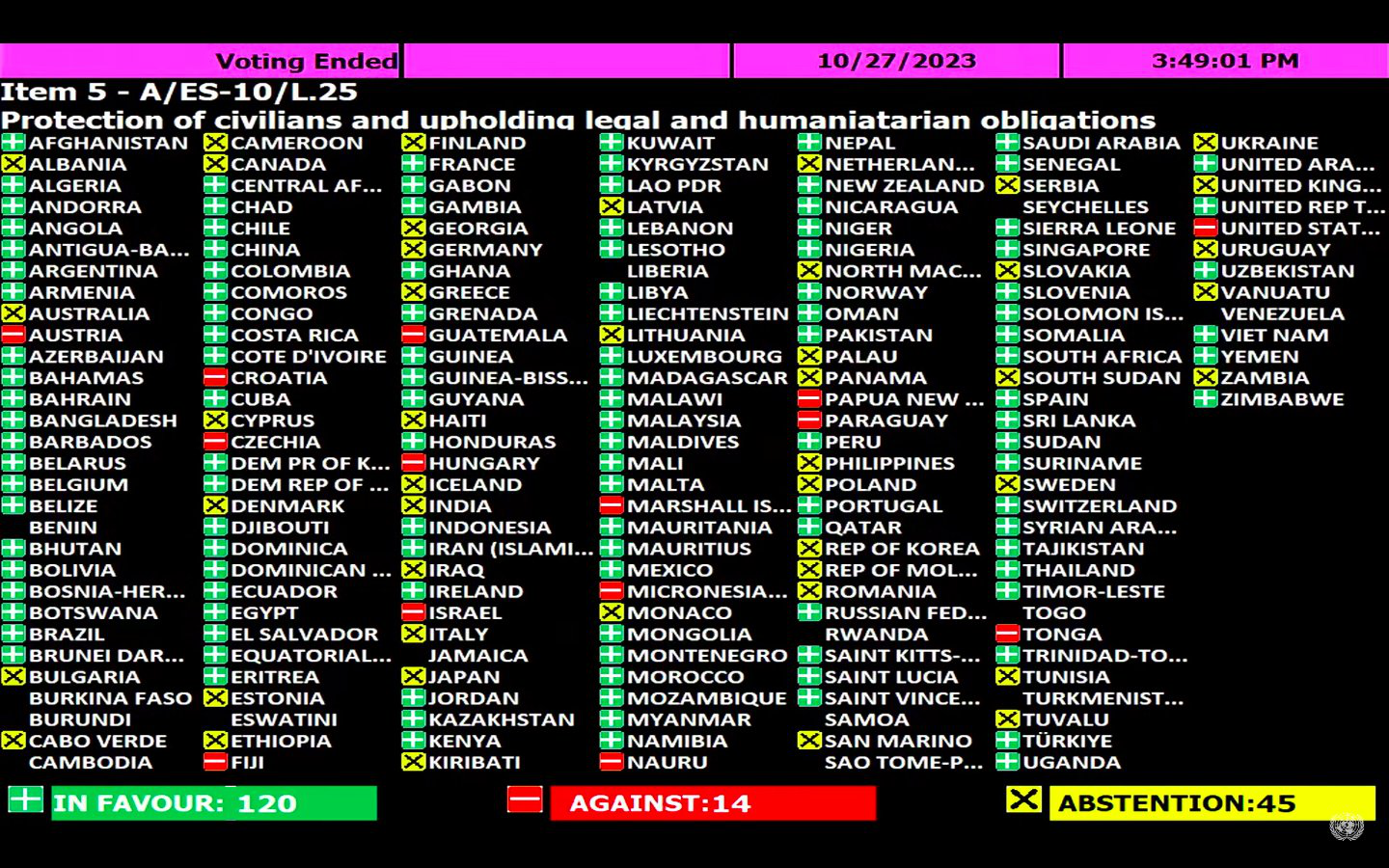
On 27 October, the United Nations General Assembly passed Resolution ES-10/21 calling for an "immediate and sustained" humanitarian truce and cessation of hostilities.

=== Al-Maghazi UNRWA school ===
On 17 October 2023, an airstrike conducted by the IDF struck a United Nations Relief and Works Agency for Palestine Refugees in the Near East (UNRWA) school in the Al-Maghazi refugee camp in the Gaza Strip. The UNRWA reported six people were killed by the airstrike and dozens more were injured, including UNRWA staff. The organization also claims that at least 4,000 people had taken refuge in the school since the start of the Gaza war.

At least five people were killed in an airstrike on the Maghazi Secondary Girls School on 27 December.

=== Osama bin Zaid School ===
On 3 November 2023, an air strike by the Israel Defense Forces bombed Osama bin Zaid School in the Al-Saftawi area, located in the northern Gaza Strip, a school belonging to the United Nations Relief and Works Agency for Palestine Refugees in the Near East (UNRWA). 20 people were killed in the airstrike and dozens of other civilians were injured, according to the Ministry of Health in Gaza. The Ministry of Health and UNRWA said that at least 1,000 people have taken refuge in the school since the beginning of the war.

=== Al-Fakhoora School ===
External videos
- Gazan child speaks of having to carry decapitated body after Israeli strike on Jabalia on 4 November (via The Irish Times)

On 4 November, a UNRWA spokeswoman confirmed reports that Israel had conducted another airstrike against a UN-run school in the Jabalia refugee camp. According to the Gaza health ministry, the attack on the Al-Fakhoora school killed fifteen and wounded dozens more. Reuters reported having obtained a video of a boy crying in despair: "I was standing here when three bombings happened, I carried a body and another decapitated body with my own hands. God will take my vengeance." According to UNRWA, at least one strike hit the schoolyard, where displaced families had set up their tents. In response to the strike, Al Jazeera remarked Israel was "trying to eliminate all sources of survival for the civilian population to force the evacuation to the southern part of Gaza."

A second airstrike on the school occurred in the early hours of the morning on 18 November. Journalists on the scene reported dead bodies everywhere, suggesting the strike may have been an Israeli message to civilians to flee to the southern Gaza Strip. The second strike killed at least 50 people. A video clip surfacing following what has been described as a "massacre" depicts a man walking through several rooms where dozens of corpses can be seen, and distress can be heard throughout the school.

=== Al-Buraq School ===
On 9 November 2023, an Israeli airstrike bombed Al-Buraq School on Lababidi Street in the Al-Nasr neighbourhood, north of Gaza City, which was being used by the United Nations Refugee Agency (UNRWA) as a shelter. The people took shelter in the school were ones that their homes were destroyed. At least 50 people were killed in the attack, with multiple injuries reported. The Israeli missile fell on the school in the morning when thousands of people were sheltering inside it. The attack led to the death of at least 50 people and injuries. Among the dead were also children. The Palestinian Ministry of Health said that dozens of others were injured. The IDF claimed that Ahmed Siam, a Hamas commander who they alleged “held hostage approximately 1,000 Gazan residents at Rantisi Hospital," was killed in the strike along with other Hamas operatives.

=== Al-Falah School ===
On 17 November 2023, an Israeli airstrike bombed Al-Falah School in the Al-Zaytoun neighborhood of the city, which was being used by the United Nations Refugee Agency (UNRWA) as a shelter. At least 20 people were killed in the attack, with multiple injuries reported. The Israeli missile fell on Al-Falah School in the morning, when thousands of people were sheltering in it. Due to the communications blackout in the Gaza Strip at the time, rescue teams were not aware of the strike on the school until the following day.

=== Abu Hussein School ===
On 23 November 2023, an Israeli airstrike bombed the Abu Hussein School in Jabalia camp, which was being used by the United Nations Refugee Agency (UNRWA) as a shelter. At least 27 people were killed in the attack, with multiple injuries reported. The Israeli missile fell on Abu Hussein School in the morning when thousands of people were sheltering inside of it. The Abu Hussein School was again bombed in October 2024, reportedly killing at least 28 people, including multiple children.

=== An-Nazla School ===
The An-Nazla elementary school in northern Gaza was bombed while hundreds of refugees sheltered there. At least ten people were killed, including children. On 25 May 2024, a woman whose daughter was injured in the attack, stated, "The children were playing in the schoolyard, and suddenly we were bombed. We lived something unnatural."

=== Al-Sardi ===
On 6 June 2024, at approximately 2 am, Israeli forces airstrike hit the classrooms on the highest floor of the Al-Sardi school in the Nuseirat refugee camp with two missiles. The strike was carried after the army declared new ground assaults and airstrikes on several refugee camps in central Gaza. The munition used in the attack was of the same variety employed in the Tel al-Sultan attack, namely a GBU-39.

=== Haifa School ===
On 15 December 2023, an Israeli airstrike struck the Haifa School in the city of Khan Yunis in the southern Gaza Strip, which was being used by the United Nations Refugee Agency (UNRWA) as a shelter. At least 20 people were killed in the attack, with multiple injuries reported. The aerial bombardment resulted in the death of Al Jazeera photographer Samer Abu Daqqa, and the injury of Wael Al-Dahdouh, director of Al Jazeera in Gaza.

=== Israa University ===
Israa University in Al-Zahra, south of Gaza City, was destroyed by the Israeli military in January 2024. UNOCHA reported that the IDF had been using the campus as "an ad hoc detention facility for interrogating Palestinian detainees before their transfer to an unknown location". Birzeit University accused the IDF of stealing 3,000 rare artifacts before destroying the university.

=== Al-Awda school ===
Al Jazeera video of the Al-Awda School massacre
- External video
- Video of the air strike and its aftermath taken by a football spectator who was filming the game. Contains graphic images of severe injury.

On 9 July 2024, the Israel Defense Forces bombed Al-Awda school – the UNRWA-run school that had been converted into a displacement shelter, hosting refugees from the Israeli invasion – in Abasan al-Kabira near the city of Khan Yunis, in the Gaza Strip, Palestine. At least 31 Palestinians were killed in the attack while over 53 were injured; most of the casualties were women and children. Many of the victims were refugees from Rafah following Israel's Rafah offensive. The attack was the fourth attack on a Palestinian school conducted by the Israel Defense Forces over the prior four days.

=== Khadija School airstrike ===
The Khadija School airstrike by the Israel Defense Forces (IDF) occurred on 26 July 2024 during the Gaza war in the central region of Gaza, specifically in Deir al-Balah. The airstrike killed at least 30 individuals, including seven minors. The Gaza Health Ministry run by Hamas reported an additional 100 casualties. The victims, who had sought shelter at the school, were transported to Shuhada al-Aqsa Hospital for medical attention.

=== Hamama School ===
On 4 August 2024, the Israel Defense Forces (IDF) bombed Hamama School in the neighborhood of Sheikh Radwan, Gaza City. The school had been sheltering people displaced by the Israeli invasion of the Gaza Strip, including women and children. Per Gaza's Civil Defense, 17 people were killed and "many others" were wounded, while the school itself was "completely destroyed". The attack was one of a number of attacks on schools during the Israeli invasion of Gaza.

The Israeli army stated that the school was being used by Hamas to plan and carry out attacks against Israeli troops, as well as to manufacture and store weapons. Hamas criticized this claim as a false pretext "for targeting defenseless civilians". The Palestinian resistance movement called the attack a continuation of Israel's "brutal war of extermination" in Gaza.

=== Al-Tabin School ===
On 10 August 2024, Israel struck the Al-Tabaeen school located in eastern Gaza City, which was hosting displaced Palestinians seeking shelter there during the Gaza war. According to Palestinian health authorities, at least 80 Palestinians were killed and 47 others were injured, with several victims being trapped in the school as the fire spread. The IDF said that these numbers were inflated.

At around 4:40 during Fajr morning prayers in the Al-Tabaeen school, which was being used to house roughly 6,000 refugees and internally displaced Palestinian citizens, three rockets struck the building, causing the structure to collapse. Consequently, a fire broke out that caused several more casualties. Attempts by rescue workers and other civilians to reduce the spread of the fire and save the lives of trapped civilians were seriously impeded due to the Israeli military cutting off the region's water supply.

It was the fifth attack on a school in a week and the UN Human Rights Office said it was "horrified by the unfolding pattern" of attacks on schools. An Al Jazeera investigation found that the bombing was deliberately performed to result in maximum casualties. The IDF said that the school "contained 31 Hamas and PIJ terrorists" and was being used as a "Hamas headquarters". Additionally they stated that they had taken steps to prevent harm to civilians. Analysing the IDF's official explanations, the Israeli investigative journalist Meron Rapoport said that "the army bombed a populated shelter knowing full well the deadly repercussions its assault would inflict". A CNN weapons expert identified shrapnel evident in footage from the aftermath of the attack as coming from a GBU-39 manufactured by the US-based Boeing.

=== Al-Jawni School ===
On 11 September 2024, the Israel Defense Forces bombed the UN-run Al-Jawni school in the Nuseirat refugee camp of central Gaza. The school had been sheltering people displaced by the Israeli invasion of the Gaza Strip, including women and children. Per rescuers, 18 people were killed and more than 44 others were wounded. Among the killed were six United Nations workers, including the manager of the UNRWA shelter. This made it the highest death toll for UN staff in any single incident of the Gaza war and raising the number of UNRWA staff killed since the beginning of the war to 220. The IDF said that at least nine of the people killed were Hamas operatives. The attack was one of a number of attacks on schools during the Israeli invasion of Gaza and the fifth bombing of the Al-Jawni School since October 2023.

=== Shadia Abu Ghazala School Massacre ===
In December 2023 reports emerged of a massacre of Palestinians, including women, children and babies, by Israeli forces in the Shadia Abu Ghazala School, west of Jabalia refugee camp in Al-Faluja, the northern part of the Gaza Strip. The massacre reportedly occurred in early December. The school had been used as a shelter and had been surrounded by the IDF for several days. Video and photo footage showed bodies piled up in the school and damage to the school's interiors. Survivors of the massacre recounted women, children and babies being "killed execution-style" by Israeli troops as they were sheltering in the school. Reports say at least 7 and up to 15 bullet-ridden bodies were found.

=== Fahmi al-Jarjawi School Massacre ===
On 25 May 2025, an Israeli airstrike killed at least 36 people, including 18 children and six women and injured at least 55 others in the Fahmi Al-Jarjawi School in al-Daraj neighbourhood in Gaza City.

=== Others ===
==== 2023 ====
On 3 December 2023, the Israeli Air Force bombed the Holy Family school in Gaza City.

==== 2024 ====
In July 2024, Israeli airstrikes hit a number of schools, leading the UNRWA spokesperson Juliette Touma to state attacks on schools had become "almost a daily occurrence". On 7 July 2024, an Israeli attack on the Al-Jaouni school killed at least 16 Palestinians and injured 50, according to the Palestinian Ministry of Health. The Al-Jawni school was hit by an Israeli strike that killed 16 people, according to Gaza's Health Ministry. The following day, the Holy Family school in Gaza City was hit by a strike, the Latin Patriarchate of Jerusalem stated the school was "a place of refuge for hundreds of civilians". On 14 July 2024, an Israeli strike on the Abu Oraiban School killed 22 people and wounded 100, per the Gaza Health Ministry. On 16 July 2024, an Israeli airstrike on the al-Razi school in the Nuseirat refugee camp reportedly killed at least 42 people, becoming the sixth UN school to be bombed in a ten-day period. On 17 July 2024, UNRWA spokesperson Juliette Touma stated eight schools had been hit in the prior two weeks. On 27 July, at least 30 people were killed by an Israeli airstrike on a Deir al-Balah school.

In August 2024, UNOCHA stated that Israeli attacks against schools appeared to be "occurring with increasing frequency." Early in the month, Israeli airstrikes on the al-Nasr, Hassan Salama, and Dalal al-Mughrabi schools resulted in dozens of casualties. According to UNOCHA, the schools were sheltering thousands of internally displaced people. On 4 August 2024, an Israeli airstrike on the Hassan Salame school killed at least 30 people, according to the Palestinian emergency response agency. The school was functioning as a shelter for displaced people. On 20 August 2024, the Gaza Civil Defence authority stated that an Israeli airstrike had killed at least 12 people at the Mustafa Hafez school. (Note: According to Al Jazeera English reporter Tareq Abu Azzoum, the Israeli military bombed the school without providing any warning.) The following day, the Civil Defence stated at least an Israeli airstrike killed at least four people in the Salah al-Din School.

In September 2024, an Israeli airstrike killed at least 24 people and wounded 30 on the Zeitoun School in Gaza City. The Jordanian Ministry of Foreign Affairs condemned the strike in the "strongest terms". Later that same month, an Israeli attack on the Hafsa al-Faluja School killed at least fifteen people. 28 people were killed in October 2024 by an Israeli bombing of the Rufaida school. Seven people were reportedly killed by an Israeli bombing of the Zayd ibn Haritha school. On 19 October 2024, an Israeli airstrike killed at least 73 people at the Asmaa School in Gaza's Al-Shati refugee camp in Beit Lahia, according to Gaza's Civil Defense. On 24 October 2024, an Israeli airstrike killed at least 17 people at the Al-Shuhada school, according to hospital officials. On 3 November 2024, the IDF attacked a Gaza Soup Kitchen school in Beit Lahia, which had a sign on its roof stating: "School. Please Don't Bomb" in Hebrew and English.

==== 2025 ====
On 3 April 2025, at least 27 Palestinians, including women and children, were killed by an Israeli airstrike in the Dar al-Arqam school in Tuffah. On 23 April, ten people were killed in an Israeli attack on Yafa School in Gaza City. According to reports, one of the victims, a child, was burned to death in a fire after the attack. On 12 May, at least 16 Palestinians, including five children were killed in an Israeli airstrike when Israeli forces targeted the Fatima Bint Assad School in the Jabalia refugee camp. On 19 May, at least five people were killed and several others were injured, including children, when Israeli airstrikes targeted Al-Hasayna School, a school-turned-humanitarian-shelter in the Nuseirat refugee camp. On 20 May, ten people were killed by an Israeli airstrike in the Musa bin Nusayr School. On 3 July, at least 16 people were killed by Israeli forces in the Mustafa Hafez School in Gaza City.

On 11 July, eight Palestinians, including children, were killed when Israeli forces targeted the Halimah al-Saadiyah School in Jabalia.

==== 2026 ====
On 6 April 2026, during the ceasefire since October 2025, an Israeli airstrike targeted near a school housing displaced people in the Maghazi refugee camp, killing at least 10 people and injuring dozens others. The attack occurred during clashes between Hamas security personnel and members of an Israeli-backed armed group.

On October 25, 2026, three guards were killed in an Israeli airstrike on the Islamic University of Gaza campus. This was the second attack on the university in just a few hours. In a previous drone attack on this university, seven female students were injured by shrapnel. In a statement, Hamas described the airstrikes on the Islamic University campus in Gaza as a “designated war crime” and called on mediators to intervene to stop Israeli attacks.

== War crime allegations ==
Israel's motivations for attacking civilian structures in Gaza remains disputed. Israel states it is attacking them as military targets, while critics accuse Israeli soldiers of deliberately targeting civilians and civilian infrastructure in revenge for the October 7 attacks.

During the Gaza war, the IDF claimed it had evidence of Hamas rockets launched next to schools. Forensic Architecture, a British research group, looked into IDF's evidence and found IDF would often present a singular instance of alleged Palestinian military use of a school to give blanket justification for widespread attacks on schools in that area. Even in the singular cases the IDF presented, Forensic Architecture found IDF's evidence to be misleading and unproven. Israel also accused Hamas of using schools as "command and control centers". Although Israel claims it is targeting Hamas, rescue teams digging through the rubble of destroyed schools reported that they have found most of the dead to be women and children. Hamas denies that's it's using schools for military purposes.

In another video, IDF soldiers cheer as they blow up blue colored UNRWA schools. IDF soldiers have also posted videos of themselves destroying or vandalizing Gaza schools. In one video, IDF soldiers set a library on fire.

Many, including over 1,600 academics, and news channels have said that Israel is targeting educational facilities and committing scholasticide in Gaza. Sean Carroll, the CEO of the American Near East Refugee Aid, stated scholasticide was an accurate term and described the "targeting" of schools.

== Impact ==
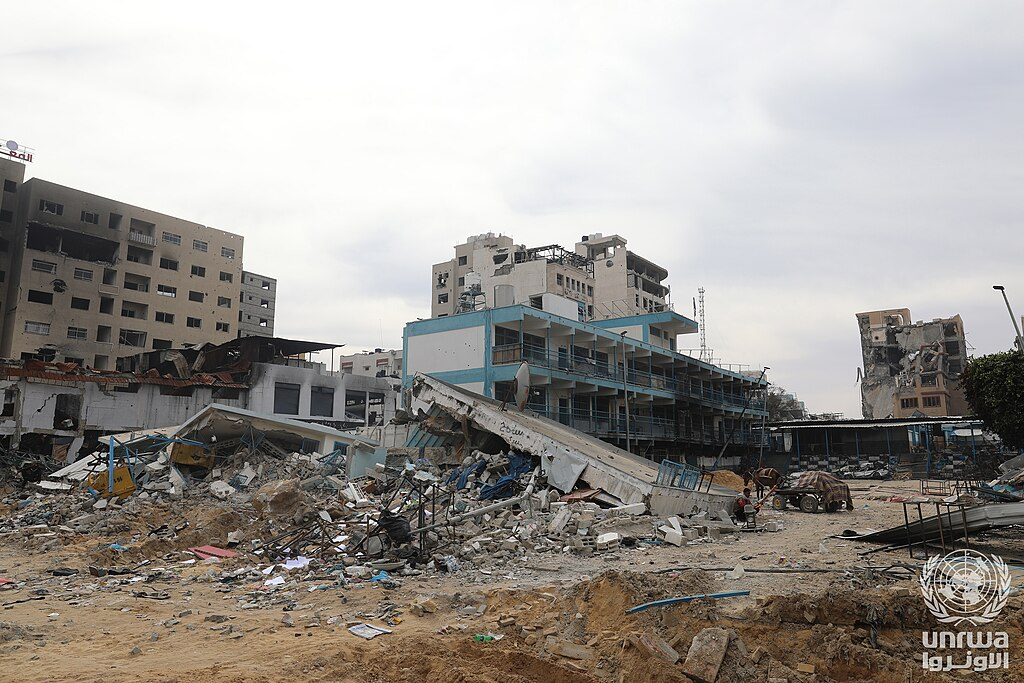
A destroyed UNRWA school in Zaytun in February 2024

The Gaza Education Ministry stated that 4,037 students and 209 educational staff were killed, 7,259 students and 619 teachers were wounded, and 352 schools were damaged between 7 October and 26 December. On 16 January, the Education Ministry reported 4,368 students had been killed and 388 schools damaged since 7 October. Human rights groups reported 94 professors had been killed. By 4 February 2024, Gaza's Ministry of Education stated 4,800 students had been killed. In March 2024, the Ministry of Education and the UN stated that 5,479 students had been killed thus far. By the end of March, the Ministry of Education stated the total had risen to 5,881 students. As a result of the destruction of schools in Gaza, the education of 600,000 children has been cut short. Some students were enrolled in online school.

In late December 2023, the UN stated 90% of school buildings in Gaza were being used for shelter. The UN further reported that 75% of Gaza's educational infrastructure had been damaged. On 11 February 2024, a representative with the Gaza Education Ministry stated, "All higher education institutions in the Gaza Strip were damaged, either completely or partially". In late-April 2024, UNOCHA estimated that 65% of schools used to shelter displaced people had been "directly hit or damaged". In May 2024, the Government Media Office stated more than 100 academics in Gaza had been killed by Israel. In June 2024, some 39,000 high students were unable to take their secondary school final exams.

A report by researchers at the University of Cambridge, the Centre for Lebanese Studies, and UNRWA stated that Israel's attacks had set back Palestinian children's education five years and risked creating a "lost generation".

The war has severely degraded Gaza’s education sector, on an unprecedented scale. As of spring 2025, 778 of Gaza’s 815 schools (about 95.5%) have been damaged. Roughly 574 have suffered direct hits, with many badly damaged or destroyed; others show varying levels of blast and shrapnel damage. Well over 200 schools will have to be rebuilt from scratch, and most of the remainder will need major repairs before they can safely reopen. About 88.5% of education facilities require major rehabilitation or full reconstruction. The few school buildings left structurally intact are largely non-functional because they are housing internally displaced people. This use further strains already fragile facilities and heightens the risk of additional damage or attack.

To address the education crisis, UNRWA, UNICEF, and local authorities launched temporary learning programmes, though these have reached only a small share of Gaza’s children. Beginning in August 2024, "Temporary Learning Spaces" (TLS) were set up in displacement shelters and relatively safer areas, offering basic education. At their height in early 2025, 449 TLS operated across 58 UNRWA shelter sites, serving about 56,000 children, which is roughly 8.5% of the student population. Classes followed shortened, rotating timetables, with around 2.5 hours of instruction three days a week. Younger pupils (grades 1–4) were prioritised for in-person lessons, while older ones were encouraged to use remote learning where possible. Renewed hostilities in March 2025 forced many sites to shut down again, and by late April only 182 TLS were still functioning, with attendance down to about 24,500 children, or roughly 30% of the level seen during the ceasefire period.

=== Effects on children ===
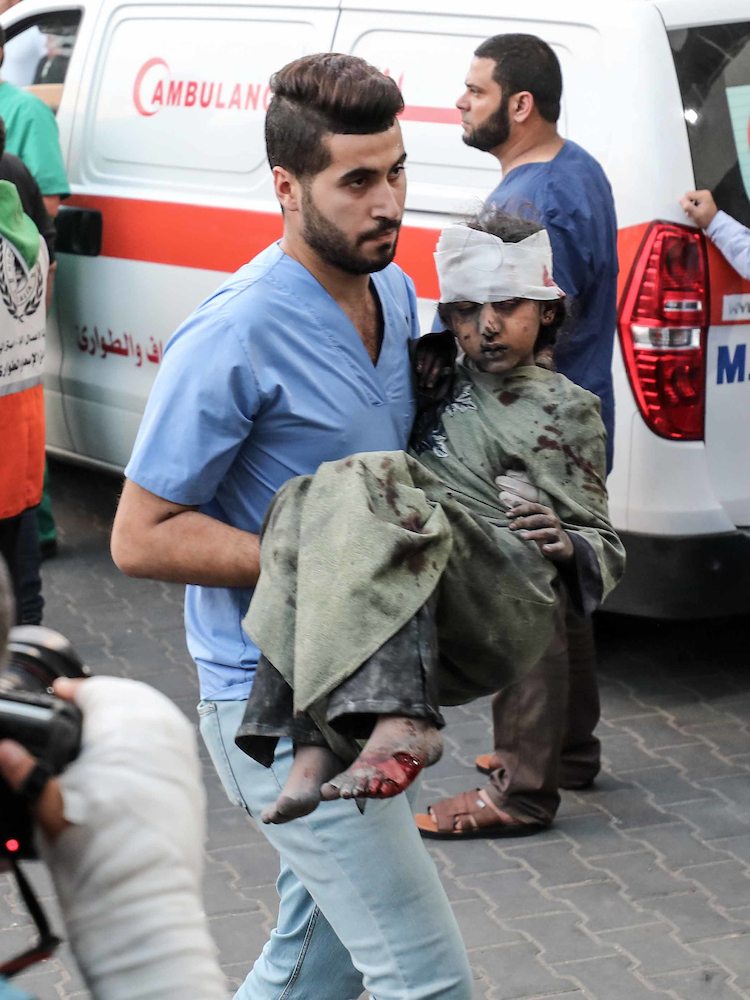
Wounded child at Al-Shifa Hospital

As a result of the Gaza war, children have been disproportionately impacted in the Gaza Strip, where 40% of the population is 14 or under. On 13 November, UNICEF reported that more than 700,000 children in Gaza were displaced. A dire humanitarian crisis, with reports of children suffering from a serious epidemic of gastroenteritis due to the lack of clean water, led to concerns amongst health officials and aid organizations. Speaking to reporters early in the conflict, UN Secretary General Antonio Guterres warned that "Gaza is becoming a graveyard for children. Hundreds of girls and boys are reportedly being killed or injured every day."

Save the Children, UNICEF, and Palestinian health officials described children being left with permanent disabilities, mental health issues, and amputations, with thousands experiencing dehydration, malnutrition, respiratory, and skin diseases. By late-March 2024, an estimated 13,000 children in Gaza had been killed, with thousands more buried under rubble. The UNICEF deputy director called the conditions of children in Gaza the "most horrific" he had ever seen. (Note: He also called for immediate and "unconditional" release of Israeli children who are being held hostage by Hamas.) The ongoing crisis also impacted routine vaccinations, leaving thousands of children at risk, and further compounded challenges included inadequate shelter, a lack of adequate winter coats, and the psychological toll on children's mental health.

The suspension of the 2023–2024 school year because of the ongoing war has left over 625,000 pupils and also 22,500 teachers in Gaza out of school. In April 2024, the Palestinian Ministry of Education stated that 5,994 students in Gaza had been killed since 7 October. UNICEF reported that 80% of schools in Gaza are either damaged or destroyed, leaving students without access to education. The Palestine Red Crescent Society (PRCS) stated that around 1,000 children in Gaza have suffered the loss of one or both legs. Additionally, the United Nations revealed that over 50,000 children in Gaza are facing severe malnutrition.

As of January 2025, children in Gaza had been without formal schooling for over a year. While some informal classes reportedly take place in displacement camps, parents say their children are falling behind academically, forgetting basic literacy skills, or losing crucial years of education altogether.

== Reactions ==
=== In Palestine ===
A master's student at the Islamic University of Gaza stated, "We're talking about not only the structure of the university being destroyed, but also the future of all the students. People who had started studying a master's, material degree, or even a PhD. We don't know how we will continue."

Al Jazeera correspondent Hind Khoudary stated, "Schools in the Gaza Strip are not only schools, they are shelters and graveyards." In May 2024, Palestinian Prime Minister Mohammad Mustafa shared an image of an Israeli soldier burning books at Al-Aqsa University, stating, "Israel has targeted all universities in the Strip, with some being completely destroyed". In a New York Times editorial, Mosab Abu Toha wrote, "How can a teacher — me or anyone else — return to teach children and pretend these same places have not been zones of death and suffering?"

=== International ===
==== Academics and activists ====
The neologism "scholasticide", also used in 2009 to describe "the systematic destruction by Israeli forces of centers of education dear to Palestinian society", saw a reemergence amid the hostilities in 2023 and early 2024. Professor Chandni Desai of the University of Toronto stated "Scholasticide isn't genocide on its own, but what one could argue that it is part of the genocidal war."

Nobel laureate Malala Yousafzai discussed a spate of school bombings in July 2024, stating, "It is horrifying how many schools have been bombed in Gaza". In a September 2024 social media post, Yousafzai wrote, "I am appalled that Israel keeps targeting schools in Gaza — where thousands of displaced people are sheltering — with indiscriminate strikes."

In January 2025, the members of the American Historical Association voted to condemn Israel's actions in Gaza, saying that Israel had "effectively obliterated Gaza’s education system".

In April 2025, the Organization of American Historians (OAH), passed a resolution of condemning Israel's "scholasticide" on Gaza, with a decisive majority of 104 members voted for the motion - with only 25 opposing it. The organization also urges for a permanent ceasefire in Gaza.

Rebecca Gould wrote September 2025 on scholasticide and genocidal epistemicide in Palestine that "the targeted nature of Israeli attacks on education – on the very possibility of a Palestinian future in Gaza – has gone beyond anything that has previously been seen in Palestine."

==== Humanitarian organizations ====
In June 2024, the director of the Al Fakhoura Programme in Qatar criticized the airstrikes, stating, "Targeting critical educational infrastructure dismantles hope for many Palestinians in Gaza where education is an important and critical tool for survivability and equality".

UNRWA criticized Israel's airstrikes of schools, stating, "This blatant disregard of humanitarian law must stop". In July 2024, UNRWA chief Philippe Lazzarini addressed an Israeli airstrike on a UN school, stating, "Another day. Another month. Another school hit".

In August 2024, a UNICEF communications officer discussed Israel's attacks on schools and other civilian infrastructure, stating, "Those schools are not schools anymore. They are very basic shelters for so many families, and we have unfortunately seen in the last 10 months so many of those attacks on schools, on hospitals, on civilian infrastructure that children and families rely on, which makes life even more miserable."

Ramy Abdu, head of the Euro-Med Human Rights Monitor, described the Israeli killing of Palestinian political analyst Ayman Rafati as part of the scholasticide in Gaza. Euro-Med Human Rights Monitor has strongly condemned Israel's escalated assaults on UNRWA-operated schools sheltering displaced individuals in different parts of the Gaza Strip. The team at Euro-Med Monitor has documented substantial Israeli air and artillery attacks on no less than five UNRWA-operated schools within the last day. These offensives have led to multiple casualties and signify a grave violation of the legal safeguards that should safeguard UN facilities.

== See also ==
- Attacks on refugee camps in the Gaza war
- Attacks on health facilities during the Gaza war
- List of military engagements during the Gaza war
- UNRWA and Israel
