= Duaa Sharaf =

Palestinian journalist and radio presenter

- دعاء شرف
- Born: 1991; Al-Zawaida, Gaza Strip, Palestine
- Died: October 26, 2023 (aged 32); Al-Zawaida, Gaza Strip, Palestine
- Cause of death: Israel-Hamas war bombing strike
- Occupation(s): Journalist; Radio presenter
- Years active: ?–2023
- Employer: Radio Al-Aqsa
- Known for: Journalism during the 2023 Israel–Hamas war

Duaa Sharaf (1991 – October 26, 2023) was a Palestinian journalist and radio presenter who worked for Radio Al-Aqsa in the Gaza Strip. She became a symbol of the dangers faced by journalists in conflict zones after she and her young daughter were killed in an Israeli airstrike on their home in Al-Zawaida, central Gaza.

== Career ==
She resided with her family in Al-Zawaida, a town located in the central region of the Gaza Strip. Sharaf was employed as a radio presenter at Radio Al-Aqsa, a broadcasting outlet linked to Hamas. Through her work, she became a recognizable voice in the Palestinian media landscape, contributing to the station's coverage of political and social affairs in Gaza.

At Radio Al-Aqsa, Duaa Sharaf served as both a presenter and a reporter, covering local developments and producing programs aimed at raising public awareness. Her journalism centered on delivering news and shedding light on pressing social matters and the ongoing humanitarian challenges faced by the people of Gaza.

== Death ==
On October 26, 2023, amid one of the most intense phases of the Israel–Hamas war, an Israeli airstrike targeted the area where Sharaf lived. The strike hit her home, resulting in the deaths of both Sharaf and her young daughter. Their loss underscored the devastating impact of the conflict on civilians, particularly women and children, and brought renewed attention to the dangers faced by journalists and their families in active war zones.

== Reactions ==
Sharaf's killing was met with widespread international criticism. Organizations including the Committee to Protect Journalists (CPJ), the International Federation of Journalists (IFJ), the Coalition For Women In Journalism (CFWIJ), and the International News Safety Institute (INSI) reported on and denounced the incident.

== Legacy ==
Sharaf is remembered as one of numerous Palestinian journalists who lost their lives during the conflict. Their deaths have intensified international demands for safeguarding journalists in war zones and for conducting impartial inquiries into assaults targeting media workers.

== See also ==
- List of journalists killed during the Israel–Hamas war (2023)
