= Mohammad Al-Salhi =

Palestinian photojournalist and freelance media worker

- Born: al-Bureij refugee camp, Gaza Strip, Palestine
- Died: October 7, 2023 (aged 28–29); Al-Bureij, Gaza Strip, Palestine
- Cause of death: Shooting
- Occupation: Freelance journalist
- Employer: Fourth Authority news agency
- Known for: Reporting during the Israel-Gaza conflict; killed while working

Mohammad Al-Salhi (Arabic: محمد تهامي عبد السلام الصالحي) was a Palestinian photojournalist and freelance media worker affiliated with the Fourth Authority news agency. He was killed while reporting on the Israel–Gaza conflict on 7 October 2023, allegedly shot east of the al-Bureij refugee camp in central Gaza.

== Biography ==
El-Salhi was born and raised in the al-Bureij refugee camp in central Gaza. He pursued work as a photojournalist and freelance reporter, contributing to the local news outlet Fourth Authority and covering stories across the Gaza Strip.

Colleagues and peers described him as deeply committed to documenting the lives of Palestinians living under occupation, often focusing his work on the human consequences of political division and military conflict.

== Death ==
On 7 October 2023, al-Salhi was reporting near the border fence east of al-Bureij refugee camp when he was shot and killed. Reports from press freedom organizations stated that he had been wearing protective gear, including a press vest and helmet, at the time of the incident. His death occurred on the first day of the renewed large-scale hostilities between Israel and armed groups in Gaza.

The Committee to Protect Journalists (CPJ) called for an immediate and transparent investigation into the circumstances of his killing, while the Palestinian Journalists' Syndicate condemned the incident as a violation of press protections.

UNESCO's Director-General Audrey Azoulay also issued a public statement denouncing the killing of al-Salhi and another journalist, Mohammad Jarghoun, and emphasised the obligation of all parties to protect journalists working in conflict zones.

== Legacy ==
El-Salhi’s death was widely reported in the press freedom community and added to the growing list of journalists killed during the Israel–Gaza conflict. His name is recorded in international observatories and reports documenting attacks on the press in conflict areas. Media rights groups continue to cite his case as evidence of the dangers faced by Palestinian journalists in Gaza.
