= Al-Fakhoora school airstrikes =

Airstrike on school in Jabalia Refugee Camp

2023 al-Fakhoora school airstrikes
- Part of the Jabalia refugee camp airstrikes during the Gaza war and genocide
- Location within the Gaza Strip
- Location: Jabalia refugee camp, northern Gaza Strip
- Date: 4 November 2023; 18 November 2023
- Target: al-Fakhoora school
- Attack type: Airstrike
- Deaths: 65+
- Injuries: 70+
- Perpetrator: Israel

Israel conducted two airstrikes on the al-Fakhoora school in the Jabalia refugee camp in the northern Gaza Strip, which was being used as a shelter by the United Nations Refugee Agency (UNRWA). On 4 November 2023, an Israeli airstrike killed at least 15 people and injured 70.

An Israeli missile fell on al-Fukhora school in the morning of 4 November, when thousands of people were living in the school at the time of the attack. At least 15 people were killed and 70 injured in the attack. Children are also among the dead. The Palestinian Ministry of Health said that dozens more were injured. Arab leaders publicly pressed US Secretary of State Antony Blinken to ensure an immediate ceasefire in Gaza. However, Blinken pushed back, saying the ceasefire would only allow Hamas to regroup.

A second airstrike on the school occurred in the early hours of the morning on 18 November. Journalists on the scene reported dead bodies everywhere, suggesting the strike may have been an Israeli message to civilians to flee to the southern Gaza Strip. A video clip surfacing following what has been described as a "massacre" depicts a man walking through several rooms where dozens of corpses can be seen, and distress can be heard throughout the school. The second strike killed at least 50 people. Martin Griffiths stated the strike was "tragic news" and that "Shelters are a place for safety. Schools are a place for learning." Tamara Alrifai, a spokesperson for UNRWA, stated, "What we're seeing is another one of these horrific incidents, where civilians, people who sought shelter in a protected UN building, are paying the price." The IDF stated it had killed multiple "terrorists." Philippe Lazzarini stated, "These attacks cannot become commonplace." The Qatar Foreign Ministry stated that "an urgent international investigation and independent investigators to probe Israel's targeting of schools and hospitals in Gaza" were needed.

== See also ==
- List of military engagements during the Gaza war
- Attacks on schools during the Israeli invasion of Gaza
