= Hammam Alloh =

Palestinian nephrologist (1987–2023)

- Born: c. 1987
- Died: November 12, 2023 (aged 36)
- Cause of death: Israeli airstrike
- Occupation: Nephrologist

Hammam Alloh (Arabic: همام اللوح; c. 1987 – November 12, 2023) was a Palestinian nephrologist at Al-Shifa Hospital in the Gaza Strip.

== Biography ==
Hammam Alloh undertook secondary school education in Gaza before leaving Gaza to study medicine and qualify as a nephrologist. He returned to Gaza after 14 years. On his return, he was the only nephrology specialist in Gaza.

After the Israeli bombing of the Gaza Strip began during the Gaza war in October 2023, Alloh gave several interviews to Western media about the situation of medicine in Gaza. On October 26 he gave an extended interview to Maya Rosen of Jewish Currents:

This is not the medicine I thought I would be practicing. I always wanted to progress in my field—to learn more, to teach more. In Gaza, I haven’t been able to do that. I hope to raise my kids to be ambitious—not to think about war, missiles, rockets. Every day, I see a fear in their eyes that I can’t do much about. It’s very painful. If you have kids, you know how horrible it is not to be able to comfort them, to ensure they are alright, to make them hope for anything beyond living one more day. We want to live freely like other people—to grow scientifically and economically, to walk in the street without fearing bombardments, to make plans. We want to be able to learn, think, grow, travel, dream—to feel like we are really human. Not to think only about meeting our basic needs. This is what life has always been about for us, and now—I want the world to know—we are being eradicated en masse. This is not what life should look like.

In a 2023 interview, Alloh discussed his work in the al-Shifa Hospital.

We are being exterminated. We are being massly eradicated. And you pretend to care for humanitarian and human rights, which is not what we are living now. To prove us wrong, please do something.

When asked why he hadn't left, he responded:

You think I went to medical school and for my postgraduate degrees for a total of 14 years so I think only about my life and not my patients?

=== Death and reaction ===
Alloh was killed by an Israeli airstrike at his wife's home on November 12, 2023, at the age of 36. His father, father-in-law, and brother-in-law were also killed in the same attack.

Holly Cairns, leader of the Social Democrats in Ireland, quoted Alloh's final interview in an Irish parliamentary debate.

== See also ==
- Killing of health workers in the Gaza war
