= Palestinian Journalists' Syndicate =

Journalists in the State of Palestine

- نقابة الصحفيين الفلسطينيين
- Abbreviation: PJS
- Formation: 1979
- Type: Professional association
- Headquarters: Ramallah, West Bank
- Region served: State of Palestine
- Official language: Arabic
- President: Nasser Abu Baker
- Affiliations: International Federation of Journalists
- Website: pjs.ps

The Palestinian Journalists' Syndicate (PJS) is the official professional body representing journalists in the State of Palestine. It advocates for press freedom, the protection of journalists, and professional ethics within Palestinian media. The syndicate is a member of the International Federation of Journalists (IFJ).

== History ==
The Palestinian Journalists' Syndicate was established in 1979 as a national union for journalists in Palestine. It was formed to promote the rights of media professionals and to resist restrictions imposed on the Palestinian press. Over the years, it has expanded its role to include defending journalists from arrests, harassment, and censorship.

== Structure and membership ==
The PJS is headquartered in Ramallah and has regional branches in Gaza, Nablus, and other cities. Membership includes reporters, photographers, editors, and other media professionals working across Palestinian and international outlets. The syndicate operates under a General Secretariat, led by a president, with elected committees responsible for ethics, legal affairs, and media development.

== Leadership ==
As of 2025, the president of the syndicate is Nasser Abu Baker, a prominent journalist and press freedom advocate.

Abu Baker also serves as the vice president of the International Federation of Journalists (IFJ) Executive Committee.

== Activities ==
The PJS plays a central role in documenting and condemning violations against Palestinian journalists, particularly during conflicts in Gaza and the West Bank. It provides legal aid to detained reporters and issues regular press freedom reports.

The syndicate also collaborates with international press unions and NGOs to strengthen journalistic standards and training in Palestine. It has hosted workshops on media ethics, digital safety, and women’s representation in journalism.

== Advocacy and press freedom ==
The PJS has been vocal in demanding international accountability for the killing of Palestinian journalists, including those killed during Israeli military operations. In several statements, it has described these attacks as attempts to silence media coverage of the occupation.

It works closely with the IFJ and the Committee to Protect Journalists (CPJ) to document cases and bring them before international legal bodies.

== See also ==
- International Federation of Journalists
- Committee to Protect Journalists
- Media of Palestine
