= 2025 Nasser Hospital strikes =

Israeli strikes in Khan Yunis, Gaza, Palestine

- Part of the 2025 Khan Yunis offensive of the Israeli invasion of the Gaza Strip during the Gaza war
- Location: 31°20′52″N 34°17′36″E; Khan Yunis, Gaza Strip, Palestine
- Date: 25 August 2025; 10:00 a.m. – 10:17 a.m. (EEST)
- Target: Nasser Hospital
- Attack type: Airstrikes or shelling, double tap strike, war crime
- Deaths: 22, including five journalists
- Injuries: 50+
- Perpetrator: Israel Defense Forces

On 25 August 2025, an Israel Defense Forces double tap strike hit the Nasser Hospital in Khan Yunis, Gaza Strip, killing 22 people, including 5 journalists. Among the journalists killed were the following: Hussam al-Masri, a Reuters cameraman; Mariam Dagga, a freelance journalist for Associated Press; Mohammed Salama, an Al Jazeera cameraman; Moaz Abu Taha, a freelance photographer who also was working with Reuters, and Ahmed Abu Aziz, a correspondent for Middle East Eye and Quds News Network.

The attack also claimed the lives of medical staff, a paramedic, and other civilians, with approximately 50 others wounded, including Reuters photographer Hatem Khaled who later died. The attacks targeted the hospital's fourth floor, resulting in casualties and damage. The strikes have drawn international condemnation and have been widely covered regarding the protection of medical facilities and journalists during the Gaza war.

== Background ==
The attack occurred amidst the ongoing Gaza war and as part of the violence against journalists in Gaza. Gazan journalist Anas Al-Sharif was assassinated in a targeted killing on August 10th, a few weeks before the attack on Nasser hospital.

Nasser Hospital is one of the main hospitals in Gaza and the largest in southern Gaza. The hospital has faced multiple attacks during the war, including shelling and raids. By 2025, Nasser Hospital was operating under critical shortages of supplies and staff. The hospital was reportedly operating at full capacity, treating over 1,000 patients at the time of the strikes.

The targeted location of the strikes was the top of an outdoor staircase which was regularly used by reporters and news outlets for its view of the city, with Reuters using the location to broadcast a live stream throughout the week before the attack.

Double tap strikes are usually war crimes according to international law because, by their very nature, they are either intended to target civilians who respond to an attack or are enacted with disregard for the lives of civilian responders.

== Strikes ==
Youtube video from New York Post
- A video from Al-Ghad shows the second moments after the targeting of journalists by the Israeli strike on YouTube

The Israel Defense Forces conducted two strikes on Nasser Hospital on 25 August 2025. The initial strike occurred at approximately 10:00 a.m. local time, with a second strike following roughly 10 minutes later, according to medical officials. The first strike targeted the hospital’s top floor. A second strike hit the area as rescue workers and journalists arrived, a tactic known as a double tap strike. On 27 August CNN showed phone camera footage from the incident that suggests that the second strike actually consisted of a near-simultaneous group of two strikes. On August 29, NBC analysis of footage suggested that the first strike also consisted of two munitions since smoke was visible from two different locations afterwards, with one munition hitting the area where journalists worked and where the Reuters live feed was running while another hit the intensive care unit.

According to The Jerusalem Post, the strikes were likely shelling rather than air strikes, with the IDF saying the Israeli Air Force was not involved in the operation. An Israeli security officer speaking with CNN that the forces involved in the attack were authorized to strike the camera via a drone, but instead fired two tank shells.

An investigation by BBC Verify, published on 29 August 2025, concluded the hospital was struck at least four times rather than twice, as initially reported. Through an analysis of video footage, including material from eyewitnesses and freelancers on the ground, experts identified that the first wave of attacks involved two simultaneous strikes on separate staircases. The second wave, originally thought to be a single strike, was found to be two near-simultaneous blasts hitting the same location within fractions of a second. Experts also suggested that LAHAT missiles, a type of guided munition capable of being fired from tanks, drones, or helicopters, were likely used in the attack, with the rapid succession of the strikes indicating that at least two tanks may have been involved. Satellite images reviewed by the BBC placed IDF forces 2.5 km from the hospital, within firing range.

== Victims ==
According to Gaza's health authorities and international reports, the attacks killed at least 22 people, including:

- Four health workers and five journalists, namely Hussam al-Masri (Reuters contractor), Mohammed Salama (Al Jazeera), Mariam Dagga (freelance journalist for the Associated Press), Moaz Abu Taha (freelance journalist), Hatem Khaled and Ahmed Abu Aziz (both later died from injuries).
- One civil defence member and other medical personnel, patients, and civilians.
- Over 50 people were injured, including critically ill patients already receiving care.

Most of the deaths were caused by the second strike. The attacks damaged the emergency staircase and disrupted operations in the surgical unit, further crippling the facility's ability to function.

== Investigation ==
Shortly after the strikes, Israeli officials indicated that after an initial inquiry they had found that troops from the Golani Brigade in Khan Younis reported a "Hamas camera" that was near the hospital and was used for directing militant activity against the IDF. Officials did not provide any evidence, nor explain why the two strikes occurred or if there had been any attempt to determine if the camera was being operated by a reporter or Hamas. The Associated Press later determined the camera actually belonged to Reuters. An investigation by Reuters in September 2025 stated that the targeted camera was Hussam al-Masri's.

After international outcry, IDF investigators alleged 6 people who were killed in the attack were Hamas militants, providing names. A subsequent investigation by Associated Press noted inconsistencies in the claim, including that Israel provided no evidence for the allegations; one of the named individuals did not appear on the hospital's casualty list and doctors said no one by that name was killed; two others identified were a health care worker at Nasser Hospital and a driver for Gaza's Civil Defense; and authorities did not clarify whether any of the six were killed in the initial strike or identified among the crowd before the second strike. Ramy Abdu, the chairman of the Euro-Mediterranean Human Rights Monitor, directly challenged the claims by the IDF. He stated that two of the people labelled as Hamas militants were killed the day prior to their attack, that Imad al-Shaer was not a militant but a volunteer who had coordinated evacuations with the IDF, and that one of the people labelled as militants was not engaged in any activities but rather one of the hospital staff. He further suggested that the Israeli military gathered names from social media posts and not official documents that erroneously labelled people who were killed before the IDF attack.

== Reactions ==
=== Palestine ===
The Gaza Health Ministry described the strikes as part of a "systematic destruction of the health system" and a continuation of "genocide." The Palestinian Journalists Syndicate condemned the attack as an "open war against free media. Hamas rejected Israel's claim that it had targeted an observation camera in the area as a "false narrative."

=== Israel ===
According to The Jerusalem Post the IDF "admitted that the attack on the hospital was approved, meaning there was some Hamas target in place." Israeli Prime Minister Benjamin Netanyahu's office later described the incident as a "tragic mishap", and the IDF announced an inquiry. The IDF said it regretted "any harm to uninvolved individuals and does not target journalists as such." Netanyahu's office did not provide a similar apology in Hebrew.

On 29 August 2025, activists and journalists gathered in Nazareth, to protest the killing of Palestinian journalists. They wore “Press” insignia stickers and held banners with messages read “Don’t assassinate the truth,” using the death of reporters as a rallying cry for peace and press freedom.

=== International reactions ===
==== United Nations ====
- UN Secretary-General António Guterres condemned the strikes, calling for a "prompt and impartial investigation" and reiterating that medical personnel and journalists must be protected under international humanitarian law. The UN Office for the Coordination of Humanitarian Affairs mourned the loss of photojournalist Mariam Abu Dagga, who had worked with the agency.
- Chief executive officer of the World Health Organization, Tedros Adhanom Ghebreyesus condemned the attacks, posted on social media, "While people in Gaza are being starved, their already limited access to healthcare is being further crippled by repeated attacks." He called for an immediate ceasefire and an end to attacks on healthcare facilities.
- UNRWA Commissioner-General Philippe Lazzarini described the strikes as "shocking," called the deaths of journalists and the worsening famine in Gaza. He urged for unrestricted humanitarian access and protection for journalists and health workers.

==== Global leaders ====
United States President Donald Trump expressed displeasure, stating, "I'm not happy about it," but did not elaborate further. French President Emmanuel Macron called the strikes "intolerable," while British Foreign Minister David Lammy said he was "horrified" and demanded an immediate ceasefire. Turkey's presidential communications office labeled the attacks a "war crime" and an assault on press freedom. Canada, Germany, Switzerland, Qatar, Saudi Arabia, and Kuwait also condemned the Israeli strikes.

==== Media organizations ====
Reporters Without Borders head Thibaut Bruttin said "There are guarantees that should be granted to journalists covering conflicts, and none of that seems to be applying."

According to the BBC:

The Committee to Protect Journalists said: "Israel's broadcasted killing of journalists in Gaza continues while the world watches and fails to act firmly".
The Foreign Press Association said the latest killings must serve as a "watershed moment" and urged international leaders to act. It called on Israel to "halt its abhorrent practice of targeting journalists", adding that "too many journalists have been killed by Israel without justification".

Reuters changed its policy and didn't share detailed locations of its journalists with the Israeli military, citing the number of journalists killed by IDF strikes.

Qatari news media organization Al Jazeera Media Network condemned the killings as a “horrific crime,” noting that medical staff and journalist were targeted in what they described as a violation of international norms.

== Aftermath ==
=== Popular culture ===
American Doctor is a 2026 documentary film directed by Poh Si Teng. The film follows three American physicians from diverse backgrounds who travel to Gaza to provide medical aid during the conflict. It premiered in the U.S. Documentary Competition at the 2026 Sundance Film Festival. The film’s two Gaza-based cinematographers, Ibrahim Al Otla and Christopher Renteria, shot footage while embedded with the doctors, all while facing food shortages and the constant threat of bombardment. They uploaded their footage daily from a balcony at Nasser Hospital.

== See also ==
- Nasser Hospital siege
- Nasser Hospital mass graves
- November 2026 airstrike on Nasser Hospital
- First Geneva Convention – "the Amelioration of the Condition of the Wounded in Armies in the Field"
