= Double-tap strike =

Bombing the same location a second time

A double tap, or double-tap, is the practice of following a military strike (be it bombardment such as missile strike, air strike, artillery shelling, or detonation of explosive weapon or improvised explosive device) with a deliberately timed second strike in the same place several minutes later, usually in an attempt to maximize the casualties of an attack. A triple tap refers to an additional third strike which follows the second strike. The term is usually associated with instances where emergency responders and medical personnel rushing to the site hit by the first strike are hit by the second strike. A quadruple tap refers to a sequence of four strikes, where three subsequent waves follow an initial attack in the same location to target those who gather at the site.

A Florida Law Review article defines the practice as strikes separated by five to twenty minutes, stating that the practice is likely a war crime and arguing that it violates the Geneva Conventions of 1949, which prohibit targeting civilians, the wounded, and those no longer able to continue fighting.

== Examples ==
The use of double-tap strikes by coalition forces during the War in Afghanistan (2001–2021) and Iraq War started the debate due to the possibility of non-combatants, including medical personnel, being among those responding to the first strike and therefore being hit by the second strike. Double-tap strikes have been used by Saudi Arabia during its military intervention in Yemen, by the United States in Pakistan, Yemen, and the Gulf of Mexico, by Israel in the 2014 Gaza War, the Gaza war (2023-present), and the 2026 Lebanon war, by Russia and the Ba'athist Syria in the Syrian civil war, and by Russia in the Russo-Ukrainian War, especially since the full-scale invasion in 2022. An in-depth report on Russian double-tap strikes in Ukraine was compiled by Truth Hounds in 2024.

=== Executed by Israel ===
==== 2025 Nasser Hospital strikes ====
On 25 August 2025, an Israel Defense Forces double tap strike hit the Nasser Hospital in Khan Yunis, Gaza Strip, killing 22 people, including 5 journalists. Among the journalists killed were the following: Hussam al-Masri, a Reuters cameraman; Mariam Dagga, a 33-year-old female freelance journalist for Associated Press; Mohammed Salama, an Al Jazeera cameraman; Moaz Abu Taha, a freelance photographer who also was working with Reuters, and Ahmed Abu Aziz, a correspondent for Middle East Eye and Quds News Network.

The attack also claimed the lives of medical staff, a paramedic, and other civilians, with approximately 50 others wounded, including Reuters photographer Hatem Khaled who later died. The attacks targeted the hospital's fourth floor, resulting in casualties and damage. The strikes have drawn international condemnation and have been widely covered regarding the protection of medical facilities and journalists during the Gaza war.

==== 2026 Mayfadoun ambulance strikes ====
On 15 April 2026, Israeli forces carried out a quadruple tap strike in Mayfadoun, Lebanon. The attack involved four consecutive waves of strikes targeting three different ambulance corps. After an initial airstrike, paramedics from the Islamic Health Association were hit by a second strike while responding to the scene. As additional rescuers from the Islamic Risala Scout Association and the Nabatieh Emergency Services arrived to evacuate the wounded, two further strikes hit their vehicles.

The four strikes resulted in the deaths of four paramedics and the wounding of six others. While the Israeli military has previously stated that such strikes target infrastructure used by combatants, the Nabatieh emergency services released video evidence of the ambulance interiors to demonstrate they were not transporting weapons. The Lebanese Ministry of Health and the World Health Organization condemned the incident, noting that medical personnel are protected non-combatants under international law. The event was cited by rescuers and journalists as a deadly escalation of the "double tap" tactic, leading to the coining of the term "quadruple tap".

==== 2026 Majdal Zoun attack ====
On 29 April 2026, BBC’s Middle East correspondent Hugo Bachega reported that in another double-tap attack, Israel killed three Lebanese Civil Defense rescue workers in Majdal Zoun: Hussein Ghadbouni, Hussein Sati, and Hadi Daher. The Lebanese health ministry did not identify the six other fatalities killed in the preceding strike. Israeli military claimed, without evidence, it had struck a Hezbollah commander.

=== Executed by Russia ===
Examples of double-tap strikes carried out by Russian forces in Ukraine include:

- the Kharkiv government building airstrike, which killed 44
- the 2023 Pokrovsk missile strike, which killed ten and wounded 93
- the 15 March 2024 Odesa missile strikes, which killed 21 and wounded 75
- the August 2026 missile strike on a shopping mall in Kryvyi Rih, which killed 16

==== 2026 Komyshuvakha strike ====
Aftermath of the 2026 Komyshuvakha strike

On 2 November 2026, Russia struck a school that was set up as a humanitarian aid hub in Komyshuvakha, Zaporizhzhia Oblast. Over 50 people were killed, two of the victims were rescue workers, and four were policemen. Bodycam footage from one of the killed Ukrainian police officers was released and verified by Reuters. It showed 15-20 workers descending to the shelter from the first strike when a second air alarm goes off. They descend to the shelter when the second strike hits. Michael O'Flaherty, Council of Europe Commissioner for Human Rights, condemned the strike as a violation of international humanitarian law and amounting to war crimes.

== See also ==
- Dead checking

== Sources ==
- Grieco, J.; Ikenberry, G.J.; Mastanduno, M. (2022). Introduction to International Relations: Perspectives, Connections and Enduring Questions. Bloomsbury Publishing. ISBN 978-1-350-93374-3.
