= Timeline of the Gaza Strip healthcare collapse =

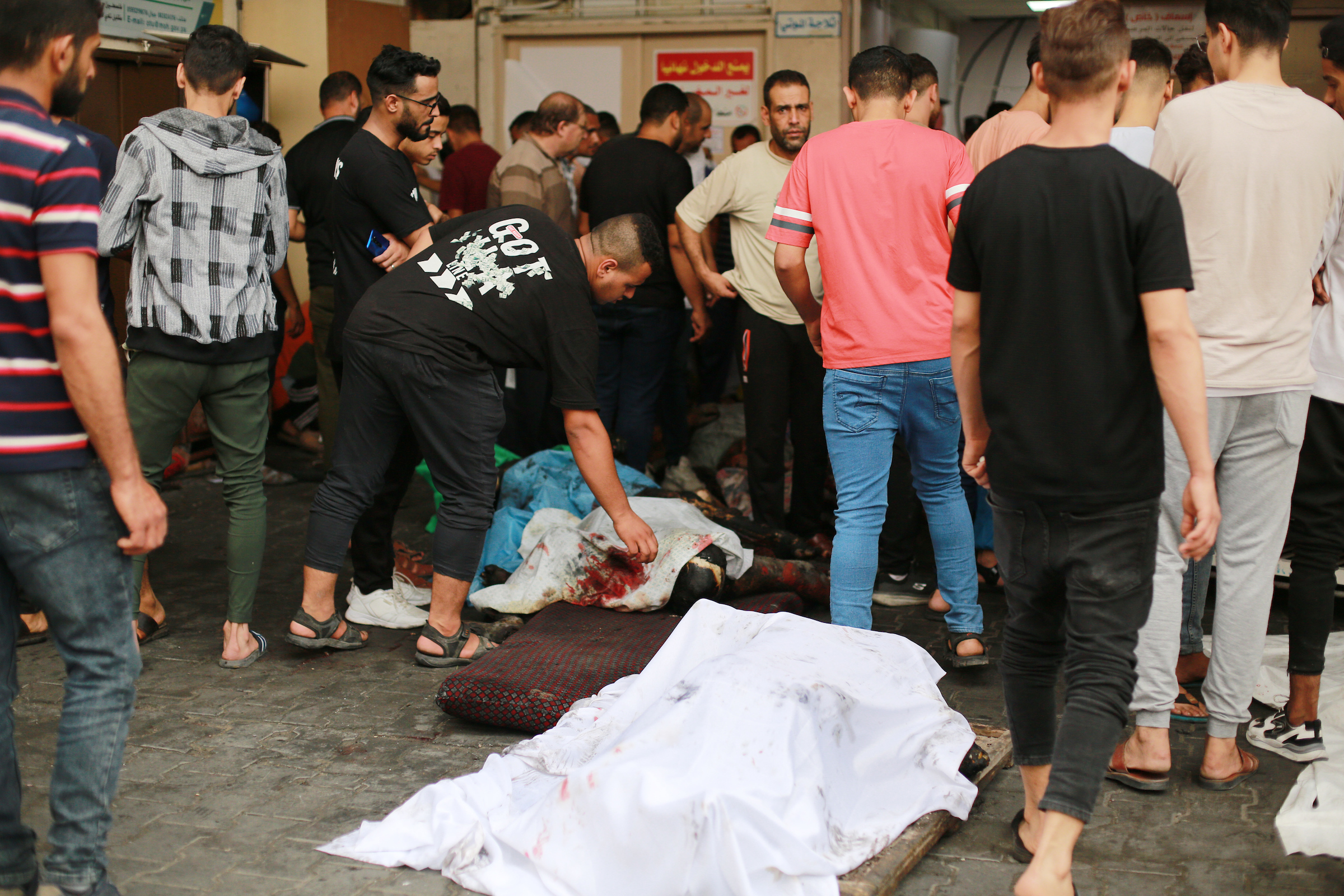
Injured people after an airstrike, Indonesia Hospital

During the Gaza war, the healthcare system of Gaza was destroyed by Israeli attacks on hospitals and health facilities, killing of healthcare workers, and blockade of medical supplies from entering Gaza. The resulting collapse of the healthcare system was part of a broader humanitarian crisis in the Gaza Strip caused by the war.

The hospitals faced a lack of fuel due to the Israeli siege and relied on backup generators for the first two weeks of the war. By 23 October 2023, Gaza hospitals began shutting down as they ran out of fuel, starting with the Indonesia Hospital. When hospitals lost power completely, multiple premature babies in NICUs died. By the end of May 2024, both the World Health Organization and International Rescue Committee reported only one-third of Gaza's hospitals remained at least partially operational.

Numerous medical staffers were killed, and ambulances, health institutions, medical headquarters, and multiple hospitals were destroyed. The Medecins Sans Frontieres (MSF) said scores of ambulances and medical facilities were damaged or destroyed. By late-October, the Gaza Health Ministry stated the healthcare system had "totally collapsed", while on 13 January out of Gaza's 36 hospitals reportedly remained partially functional. By May 2024, the World Health Organization documented 450 Israeli attacks on Gaza's healthcare system.

== October 2023 ==
=== 14 October ===
- Two upper floors of the Diagnostic Cancer Treatment Centre of the Al-Ahli Arab Hospital was severely damaged by Israeli rocket fire.
- Red Crescent ambulances in Gaza were struck by the IAF.

=== 15 October ===
- WHO stated four hospitals were no longer functioning after being targeted by Israeli airstrikes.
- WHO described Israel's evacuation order as a "death sentence" for the sick and wounded.
- Doctors across northern Gaza stated they were unable to follow Israel's evacuation order, since their patients, including newborns in the ICU, would die.

=== 16 October ===
- MSF president Christos Christou wrote that the situation in Gaza was "horrific and catastrophic… No electricity, no medical supplies. Surgeons in Al-Shifa hospital are now operating without painkillers."
  - Doctors warned of an impending disease outbreak due to hospital overcrowding and unburied bodies. The same day, the World Health Organization stated there were only "24 hours of water, electricity and fuel left" before "a real catastrophe."

=== 17 October ===
- A widely condemned explosion in the al-Ahli courtyard resulted in significant fatalities.
- An explosion at al-Ahli al-Arabi Baptist Hospital in Gaza City caused heavy casualties and triggered outrage in the Arab world.

=== 18 October ===
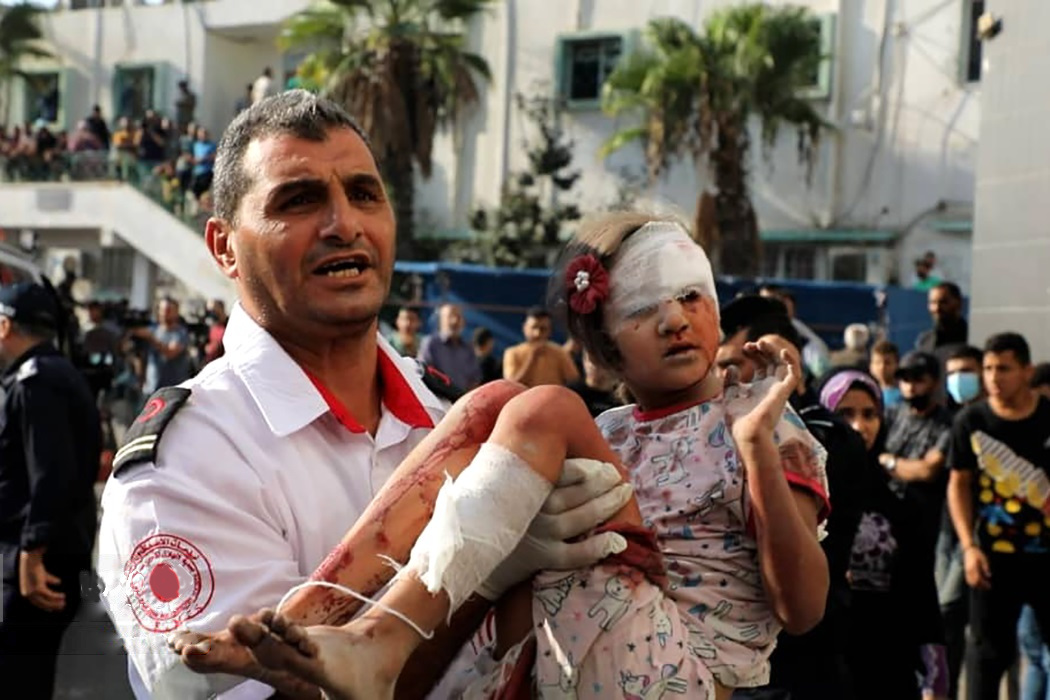
Medic carrying wounded Palestinian child in Gaza

- The United States vetoed a UN resolution urging humanitarian aid to Gaza.

=== 19 October ===
- The Ministry of Health asked for donations of liters of fuels to continue powering hospital generators.
- Gaza's only cancer hospital announced it had "perilously low" levels of remaining fuel.
- Doctors stated pediatric patients had developed gastroenteritis infections due to the lack of clean water.
- Airstrikes hit the area around al-Quds Hospital.
- The Red Cross stated Gaza's entire health system was "on its knees".

=== 20 October ===
- Doctors Without Borders stated thousands of people were at risk of dying "within hours" because it was "impossible" to give them medical attention.
- Doctors at al-Quds Hospital and the Palestine Red Crescent reported they received a call from the Israeli army to evacuate the hospital or "bear the consequences".

=== 21 October ===
- Medical Aid for Palestinians and UNICEF issued an "urgent warning" that 130 premature babies would die if fuel did not reach Gaza hospitals soon.

=== 22 October ===
- The UN Population Fund stated there were 50,000 pregnant women in Gaza.
- A UN statement signed by UNDP, UNFPA, UNICEF, WFP and WHO stated deaths could soon "skyrocket" from disease and "lack of healthcare".
- UNRWA announced it would run out of fuel within three days, resulting in "no water, no functioning hospitals and bakeries".

=== 23 October ===
- On 23 October, the Indonesia Hospital ran out of fuel and completely lost power.
- A Health Ministry spokesman announced the healthcare system had "totally collapsed", with 65 medics killed, 25 ambulances destroyed, and many hospitals soon shutting down due to lack of fuel.
- The World Health Organization warned 46 of Gaza's 72 healthcare facilities had stopped functioning.

=== 25 October ===
- Dr. Ashraf al-Qudra, of the Health Ministry, stated the health system was "completely out of service".
- The Health Ministry stated a total of 7,000 sick and wounded hospital patients were facing death.
- The Al-Aqsa Martyrs Hospital faced a dialysis crisis, with hundreds sharing only 24 dialysis machines.

=== 27 October ===
- A Red Cross medical team arrived in Gaza, bringing medical supplies, a war surgery team, and a weapons contamination specialist.
- The Al Nasser Hospital in Khan Younis received a delivery of medical supplies, including antiseptic, injections, and medical mattresses, raising hopes more could be received "in the coming days".

=== 28 October ===
- A communications blackout meant wounded civilians could not dial emergency services. Ambulances were evenly geographically distributed to provide "faster access to the injured."
- Israel conducted a heavy round of airstrikes and said that it was "expanding its ground forces" in besieged Gaza. Several of these air strikes reportedly hit near the vicinity of both al-Shifa Hospital and the Indonesia Hospital.

=== 29 October ===
- The Palestinian Red Crescent reported that it had received warnings from Israeli authorities to immediately evacuate al-Quds hospital as it was "going to be bombarded".
- An Israeli airstrike struck 20 metres (65 feet) from al-Quds hospital.
- Dr. Ghassan Abu Sitta wrote on X that he was increasingly treating patients with "distinctive phosphorus burns."

=== 30 October ===
- The Turkish-Palestinian Friendship Hospital was severely damaged by an Israeli airstrike.
- WHO announced it could no longer resupply al-Shifa and al-Quds hospitals due to the high levels of risk.
- Israel attacked the immediate surroundings of the Indonesian Hospital in Beit Lahia.

=== 31 October ===
- The Health Ministry announced the generators at two key Gaza hospitals were hours from shutting down.
- The Palestinian Health Ministry issued a last warning before the shutdown of the main electrical generator in the Al-Shifa Medical Complex, stating that there are only a few hours left before going out of service.

== November 2023 ==
=== 1 November ===
- The director of the Turkish-Palestinian Friendship Hospital stated Gaza's only cancer hospital was "completely out of service" after it ran out of fuel to power its generator.
- The Gaza Health Ministry stated the maternity ward at the Al-Helou International Hospital was hit by an Israeli bombardment.

=== 2 November ===
- The Indonesia Hospital announced its main generator was no longer operational.
- UN OCHA reported that since 7 October (till 2 Nov.), around two-thirds (46 of 72) of primary healthcare clinics in Gaza have shut down because of damage or lack of fuel, which is increasing the pressure on the remaining health facilities that are still operational.
- Hospitals are facing a high volume of injured patients, morgues are at full capacity, and medical professionals are conducting surgeries without the use of anesthesia.
- As of 2 November 2023, over 21,000 people are injured, and over 1.4 million people in Gaza have been displaced.
- The World Health Organization (WHO) has verified 237 incidents targeting healthcare facilities, which clearly contravenes international humanitarian law.

=== 3 November ===
- The Health Ministry stated 12 cancer patients had died after the Turkish Hospital shut down.
- The Ministry stated 800 critically wounded patients needed to leave Gaza to receive care, stating many critically wounded patients had died in the past several days due to the collapsed healthcare system.
- A medical convoy in front of al-Shifa hospital was destroyed by an Israeli drone missile.
- Al-Quds and Indonesia Hospital were both hit by airstrikes.

=== 4 November ===
- The generators at Kamal Adwan Hospital shut down.
- The entrance of the al-Nasser Children's Hospital was hit by an Israeli strike.
- Red Cross president Mirjana Spoljaric Egger visited the Gaza Strip, stating, "The things I saw there are beyond anything that anyone should be in a position to describe."

=== 5 November ===
- The Gaza health system was failing as a result of the Israeli blockade.
- Nearly half of all hospitals were out of service due to shortages of fuel and power, and amputations and C-sections were performed without anesthetic due to shortages of medical supplies.

=== 6 November ===
- Israel bombed al-Shifa hospital's solar panels.
- Israeli ground forces advanced towards the Indonesian Sheikh Hamad Hospital.

=== 8 November ===
- Italy announced it was sending a hospital ship to the coast of Gaza.
- Al-Quds Hospital stated Israel had destroyed all roads leading to the hospital.
- Al-Quds completely ran out of fuel and shut down most services.

=== 9 November ===
- On 9 November, the Gaza government media office stated Israel had bombed eight hospitals in the past three days.
- Health Minister Fahrettin Koca announced Turkey was prepared to receive Gaza's pediatric cancer patients.

=== 10 November ===
- The International Red Cross stated Gaza's healthcare system had "reached a point of no return."
- Israeli tanks surrounded four hospitals, al-Rantisi Hospital, al-Nasr Hospital, and the eye and mental health hospitals, from all directions.
- The Nasser Rantissi paediatric cancer hospital caught on fire after being hit by an Israeli airstrike and began evacuations.
- At least three hospitals were hit by Israeli airstrikes, resulting in multiple casualties. This led to the director of the Al-Shifa hospital to state, "Israel is now launching a war on Gaza City hospitals."
- The Interior Ministry stated Al-Shifa Hospital was bombed five times in 24 hours.
- The Palestinian Red Crescent stated Israeli snipers opened fire on children at al-Quds hospital, killing one and wounding 28.
- The Ministry of Health stated Israel cut off Indonesia Hospital's electricity, water, and communication.

=== 11 November ===
Doctors Without Borders
(@MSF_canada)
tweeted:

"We're on the fourth floor, there's a sniper who attacked four patients inside the hospital. One of them has a gunshot wound directly in his neck, and he is a quadriplegic [patient], and the other one [was shot] in the abdomen."

11 November 2023

- Ghassan Abu-Sittah, a British doctor in Gaza, stated the injured were no longer able to receive treatment for their wounds, as doctors were only able to stabilize patients.
- Doctors Without Borders reported a "dramatic intensification" of Israeli attacks on Al-Shifa hospital.
  - Al-Shifa lost power, staff were killed by snipers, and the hospital was shelled and caught fire.
  - Families who tried to leave the hospital complex were shot and killed.
  - Ashraf al-Qudra, a doctor at al-Shifa, stated the hospital was completely out of service, as the Israeli army shot "everything that moves."
  - Physicians for Human Rights stated two premature babies had died at al-Shifa due to the lack of electricity.
  - IDF spokesman Daniel Hagari stated the army would help evacuate babies from al-Shifa Hospital, but a Gaza Health Ministry spokesman stated Israel had not provided "any mechanism to get the babies out to a safer hospital."
  - Robert Mardini, director general of the Red Cross, described the situation at al-Shifa as "unbearably desperate."
- The Palestinian Red Crescent reported intense shooting and dehydrated babies at al-Quds.

=== 12 November ===
- The director general of al-Shifa stated the lives of 650 patients were in danger at al-Shifa Hospital due to the "catastrophic situation."
  - The deputy health minister in Gaza stated Israel had destroyed al-Shifa's cardiac ward.
  - The IDF released a video recording of soldiers leaving 300 liters of fuel outside Al-Shifa.
    - The director of al-Shifa stated 300 liters would not power the hospital for even 30 minutes.
- Mai al-Kaila, the Palestinian Minister of Health, stated the Israeli army was not evacuating patients, but rather "forcibly evicting the wounded and patients onto the streets, leaving them to face inevitable death."
- A surgeon at Al-Ahli hospital stated they had run out of blood for transfusions.
- The Red Crescent stated al-Quds was completely out of service.
- The director of the Nasr Hospital stated it had been evacuated under threat of Israeli weapons and tanks.
- Two of Gaza's main hospitals, Al-Shifa and Al-Quds, closed down.

=== 13 November ===
- Kamal Adwan Hospital ran out of fuel.
- Doctors Without Borders released a statement describing the situation at Al-Shifa Hospital, stating they had no food, water, or electricity, and that there was a sniper attacking patients. The statement stated, "The situation is very bad, it is inhuman."
- The al-Amal Hospital's only generator shut down.
- Tom Potokar, chief surgeon with the Red Cross, described the situation in southern Gaza as "just relentless."

=== 14 November ===
- Israeli tanks surrounded Al Helou Hospital in Gaza City, with the hospital director stating it was a "maternity hospital only."
- Israel launched a raid on al-Shifa Hospital, where thousands, including three dozen premature babies, were still sheltering.
  - Doctors reported 40 patients at al-Shifa died.
- Fighting near Al-Quds Hospital halted evacuation efforts.

=== 15 November ===
- Israel raided the al-Shifa hospital.
  - A journalist on the scene stated, it was "a nightmare that cannot be imagined," and that Israel had targeted the hospitals generators and communications unit, severing contact with the outside world.
  - John Kirby, spokesperson for the U.S. National Security Council, claimed Hamas and Palestinian Islamic Jihad had "stored weapons" in the hospital. These claims were disputed.
  - An al-Shifa employee interviewed by Al Jazeera stated Israel had not brought any aid or supplies, but had "detained and brutally assaulted" men who were sheltering at the hospital.

=== 16 November ===
- Rik Peeperkorn, a World Health Organization representative, stated al-Shifa hospital had no oxygen, power, or water.
  - The hospital director stated bodies were actively decomposing, patients' wounds were full of maggots, and "The smell of death is everywhere."
  - A contact within the hospital interviewed by BBC said that Israeli soldiers had supplied water to elderly patients.
  - According to The Wall Street Journal, an Israeli military official stated that aid was left at the hospital's front gate and that the hospital's staff was informed of its availability.
- The Indonesia Hospital completely shut down, leaving 45 patients in need of surgery.

=== 17 November ===
- The Palestinian Red Crescent stated its emergency medical teams were trapped at Al-Ahli Hospital.
- Staff at Al-Shifa stated 50 patients, including infants, had died due to power and oxygen shortages.
- The director of Al-Shifa stated Israel's claim to provide incubators to premature babies was false.

=== 18 November ===
- An evacuation of al-Shifa began.
  - Ismail al-Thawabta, a spokesperson for the Palestinian media office, stated patients moved to other facilities were going to die. ActionAid called it a death sentence.
  - The hospital stated six doctors would remain behind with 120 patients too sick to be transferred.
  - The IDF released images of military trucks unloading supplies outside Al-Shifa hospital. According to the military, supplies included 6,000 liters of water and 2,300 kg of food.
  - A humanitarian team from the World Health Organization visited al-Shifa and found a lack of food, water, or medicine, with signs of gunfire and a mass grave.
  - The director of al-Shifa said people were only given one hour to evacuate, stating, "we were forced to leave at gunpoint."
  - WHO stated 25 health workers and 291 patients, including 32 babies remained at al-Shifa.
- Two people were killed while traveling in a clearly identified Doctors Without Borders evacuation convoy in Gaza City. Doctors Without Borders termed it a "deliberate attack."

=== 19 November ===
- The premature babies at al-Shifa were evacuated to southern Gaza, where they were planned to be moved to Egypt the following day.
- The World Health Organization stated it was planning missions to transport the remaining al-Shifa patients to Nasser Medical Complex and European Gaza Hospital in the next 2–3 days.
- Doctors stated pediatric patients had developed gastroenteritis infections due to the lack of clean water.
- The International Committee of the Red Cross stated Gaza's entire health system was "on its knees".

=== 20 November ===
- Israel launched an offensive on Indonesia Hospital with an airstrike that reportedly killed 12 people.
  - Following the strike, Israeli tanks surrounded the hospital.
  - Staff at the hospital reported Israeli soldiers shooting inside the hospital indiscriminately.
  - Many sheltered at the hospital, as it was the last functioning one in northern Gaza.
  - The Gaza Ministry of Health stated 200 patients were evacuated from the hospital, while an estimated 500 patients remained.

=== 21 November ===
- The World Health Organization stated three hospitals in northern Gaza would be evacuated, meaning there would be no functioning hospitals left in northern Gaza.
- Four doctors were reported killed after Israel bombed al-Awda Hospital.
- The Government of Jordan reported Israel had ordered their field hospital to be evacuated and stated they would not comply.

=== 22 November ===
- The Palestinian Red Crescent stated fourteen ambulances had arrived at al-Shifa to evacuate the hospital's remaining patients.
- The Kamal Adwan hospital stated Israeli bombings increased around the hospital.

=== 23 November ===
- Four patients died in the transfer from northern Gaza to the Turkish-Palestinian Friendship Hospital.
- The Red Cross reported its staff were shot at while providing humanitarian support.
- The Gaza Health Ministry announced it would cease coordination with the WHO on patient evacuations following the Israeli arrest of Palestinian doctors. (Note: The Euro-Mediterranean Human Rights Monitor reported it had received reports that WHO either unwittingly or knowingly facilitated the doctors' arrests.)
- Staff at the Indonesia Hospital were reportedly ordered by the IDF to evacuate.
- The head of the Medical Emergency Rescue Committee stated patients and staff at the Indonesia Hospital were evacuated to the European Hospital in Khan Younis.

=== 24 November ===
- Medical workers reported dogs were eating the corpses of unburied people in the streets.
- Hospitals in northern Gaza, including al-Ahli Arab Hospital, were evacuated by the World Health Organization and the Red Cross.

=== 25 November ===
- The director general of the Ministry of Health stated the Israeli military shot at medical teams during the temporary ceasefire in effect.
- UNOCHA stated only four small hospitals in northern Gaza and eight health facilities in southern Gaza were still functioning.

=== 26 November ===
- The conditions for remaining patients at al-Shifa were reportedly dire.

=== 27 November ===
- The Ministry of Health reported a volunteer effort at al-Shifa hospital sought to restart the dialysis department.

=== 28 November ===
- The al-Shifa dialysis unit was reportedly reopened and receiving patients.
- A French warship was dispatched as a temporary hospital.

=== 30 November ===
- WHO chief Tedros Adhanom Ghebreyesus stated the health needs of Gaza had increased dramatically, though only one-third of its health facilities were functioning.
- The Health Ministry stated hundreds needed to be evacuated from Gaza to receive medical care.
- Italy and the United Arab Emirates stated they were considering establishing a field hospital in Gaza.

== December 2023 ==
=== 1 December ===
- Hospitals reported overcrowding, with doctors forced to treat patients on the floor.
- A spokesman for the Gaza crossing authority stated the Rafah crossing remained opened for the evacuation of the sick and wounded.
- Doctors Without Borders stated al-Awda hospital had been damaged in an Israeli bombing.

=== 2 December ===
Avatar of Tedros Adhanom Ghebreyesus

Tedros Adhanom Ghebreyesus
(@DrTedros)
tweeted:

Patients were receiving care on the floor, screaming in pain. These conditions are beyond inadequate - unimaginable for the provision of health care. I cannot find words strong enough to express our concern over what we're witnessing.

2 December 2023

- Saudi Arabia donated six ambulances to the Palestinian Red Crescent.

=== 3 December ===
- James Elder, a spokesman for UNICEF described Nasser Hospital in Khan Younis as a "death zone."
- The IDF bombed the Kamal Adwan hospital, killing at least four people.
- Two Red Crescent paramedics were wounded by gunfire from the Israeli military.

=== 4 December ===
- Doctors Without Borders stated hospitals in southern Gaza were overflowing with wounded patients.
- On 4 December, Red Cross president Mirjana Spoljaric Egger visited the Gaza Strip, stating, "The things I saw there are beyond anything that anyone should be in a position to describe."

=== 5 December ===
- Attacks in the vicinity of Kamal Adwan hospital were reported.
- Doctors at the Al-Aqsa Hospital stated they could not handle the overflow of patients they were experiencing.

=== 6 December ===
- Doctors Without Borders stated fuel and medical supplies at al-Aqsa hospital were critically low.
- Doctors in south Gaza reported a lack of beds and supplies.

=== 7 December ===
- The Palestinian Red Crescent stated 60 percent of the wounded in Gaza required urgent medical treatment abroad, and that ambulance service in northern Gaza had completely ceased.
- The Gaza Health Ministry stated only basic first aid was being delivered at Al-Shifa Hospital.
- WHO chief Tedros Adhanom Ghebreyesus stated fighting in southern Gaza was making it increasingly difficult to run health operations.

=== 8 December ===
- An estimated 286 health workers in Gaza had been killed by Israel.

=== 9 December ===
- WHO stated two health staff had been shot and killed by the IDF at Al Awda Hospital, besieged since 5 December.
- The director of the European Hospital stated the situation was catastrophic, with paramedics wounded in Israeli airstrikes.

=== 10 December ===
- WHO adopted a resolution to protect healthcare in Gaza, which director-general Tedros Adhanom Ghebreyesus described as "almost impossible in the current circumstances."
- Doctors Without Borders stated that the Israeli army had forced them to evacuate the Martyrs and Beni Shueila clinics, and that healthcare had completely collapsed.
- The Ministry of Health stated 50,000 people had been wounded since the start of the conflict.
- Bushra Khalidi, an expert with Oxfam, stated the situation was no longer "just a catastrophe, it's apocalyptic."

=== 11 December ===
- MSF stated one of its doctors inside Al Awda Hospital had been injured by an Israeli sniper.
- The director of Kamal Adwan Hospital stated Israel had killed two mothers and their newborn babies when Israel targeted its maternity ward. The UN confirmed the killings.

=== 12 December ===
- WHO pleaded with the Israeli army not to destroy hospitals in southern Gaza.
- Doctors Without Borders said healthcare conditions in Gaza were akin to conditions during World War I.
- Israel raided the Kamal Adwan Hospital.
- In response, Tedros Adhanom Ghebreyesus stated WHO was extremely worried for Kamal Adwan's medical staff.
- Doctors at Nasser Medical Complex in Khan Younis described a lack of supplies and barely any medical functionality.

=== 13 December ===
- The head of pediatrics at Kamal Adwan stated the IDF had ordered all men and boys above age sixteen to leave the hospital to be searched.
  - 70 medical staffers were arrested and taken to an unknown location.
- Jacobin reported 240 people were trapped at al-Awda, surrounded by Israeli snipers, without clean water and surviving on one meal per day of bread or rice.

=== 14 December ===
- A staffer at the al-Awda hospital reported Israeli snipers had shot at a pregnant civilian at the hospital.
  - A hospital monitoring manager stated a nurse had been killed by an Israeli sniper on the hospital's fourth floor through the window.
  - Renzo Fricke, an official at Doctors Without Borders, stated, "Reports coming out of Al-Awda hospital are harrowing and we are gravely worried for safety of patients and staff inside".
  - The Gaza Health Ministry stated their fear that after the Israeli raid of Kamal Adwan was complete, al-Awda would be their next target.
- The Ministry of Health reported 2,500 internally displaced persons from Kamal Adwan had been forcibly evacuated, and that IDF soldiers had prevented medical staff from continuing support to 12 babies in intensive care and ten emergency department patients, leading to two deaths.

=== 15 December ===
- Ahmad Shatat, pediatric doctor at the Emirati Hospital in Rafah, stated the number of premature babies born in Gaza had risen sharply due to mothers' lack of proper care and diet.

=== 16 December ===
- Journalists reported Israeli bulldozers had crushed people sheltering outside Kamal Adwan, with one reporter describing "a terrifying massacre and unspeakable scenes", and stating, "Dozens of displaced, sick and wounded people were buried alive".

=== 17 December ===
- Following a convoy visit to al-Shifa hospital, the World Health Organization released a statement describing the situation as a "bloodbath" with hundreds of injured patients inside laying on the floor.
- World Health Organization Director-General Tedros Adhanom Ghebreyesus stated patients had evacuated Kamal Adwan hospital, resulting in the deaths of patients, including a nine-year-old.
  - A man stated his 25-year-old son had been buried alive by IDF bulldozers at Kamal Adwan.
  - The Kamal Adwan Hospital was reported destroyed and in rubble.
- A tank shell killed children when it hit the pediatric ward at the Nasser Medical Complex.

=== 18 December ===
- The al-Ahli Arab Hospital was attacked, with displaced people forced out and two doctors arrested.

=== 19 December ===
- Margaret Harris, a World Health Organization spokesperson, said only 30% of Gaza's 20,000 pre-conflict health staff were still working, stating, "One of my colleagues described people lying on the floor in severe pain, in agony, but they weren't asking for pain relief. They were asking for water. It's beyond belief that the world is allowing this to continue."
- Tedros Adhanom Ghebreyesus stated the UN had "found deeply concerning conditions" at Nasser Medical Complex following 17 December attack on the hospital's pediatric unit.
- Doctors Without Borders reported Israeli troops seized Al-Awda Hospital, with troops stripping, binding, and interrogating all men and boys over the age of sixteen.
- The al-Ahli Hospital director stated Israeli troops arrested doctors, patients, and medical staff, partially destroyed the building's grounds, leaving the hospital unable to receive patients. Four people from 18 December attacks on the hospital died.
- Doctors Without Borders stated, "Doctors are stepping over bodies of dead children to treat other children who will die anyway. The lucky few that survive have life-changing injuries. Many injured people suffer from extreme burns, major fractures that won't heal properly and may go on to require amputations."

=== 20 December ===
- The Palestinian Red Crescent Society stated Israeli troops had besieged its northern Gaza ambulance centre.
  - The Red Crescent reported emergency and rescue teams were unable to reach the wounded.
- WHO secretary-general Tedros Adhanom Ghebreyesus reported the Al-Ahli Arab Hospital was out of service, stating, "That has left north Gaza with no functional hospital. Only four hospitals operate at a minimum level, providing very limited care".
- The Kuwaiti Hospital was overcrowded by large numbers of wounded patients following an airstrike in Rafah.
- The Red Crescent reported emergency and rescue teams were unable to reach the wounded.

=== 21 December ===
- Wounded people unable to call ambulances due to communications blackouts reported biking and taking donkey carts to hospitals, while ambulance drivers stated they simply followed plumes of smoke or the sound of explosions.
- The Palestinian Red Crescent stated their ambulance centre was still under siege.
  - The Red Crescent reported the IDF had raided the ambulance centre.
- A nurse was reportedly killed by a sniper at al-Awda hospital, with people inside left in a "state of horror".
- The director general of the Gaza Health Ministry was wounded in an airstrike on his home.
- The closure of al-Ahli Hospital meant there were no functional hospitals remaining in northern Gaza.

=== 22 December ===
- Intense shelling was reported near al-Amal Hospital in Khan Younis.
- The Palestinian Red Crescent stated Israel had destroyed all ambulance vehicles at its besieged centre, and that 47 men were stripped naked, beaten, and tortured.

=== 23 December ===
- The Palestinian Red Crescent stated the Israeli army was detaining eight emergency rescue teams.
- The head of pediatrics at Kamal Adwan Hospital reported the conditions of the IDF siege, stating, "The soldiers dug up the graves this morning and dragged the bodies with bulldozers, then crushed the bodies with the bulldozers. I have never seen such a thing before."

=== 24 December ===
- The director of the Nasser Medical Complex reported doctors were treating wounds caused by internationally prohibited weapons.

=== 25 December ===
- The Government Media Office stated 23 hospitals were out of service, that the health system was in the "final stage" of collapse, and that 9,000 people had died due to a lack of medical services.
- The Gaza Health Ministry reported 800,000 people in northern Gaza had no access to healthcare.

=== 26 December ===
- The Palestinian Red Crescent Society headquarters in Khan Younis sustained serious damage after being hit by Israeli bombing. Several staff were injured.
  - The Red Crescent lost contact with its emergency teams due to a communications blackout.
- Tedros Adhanom Ghebreyesus stated the healthcare system was under "unbearable strain", and that patients at Al-Aqsa Hospital would die while waiting for treatment.
- UNICEF representative Rik Peeperkorn expressed fears that Nasser Medical Complex would be imperiled as the IDF moved its fighting into Khan Younis.

=== 27 December ===
- Israeli army attacks were reported in the vicinity of El-Amal City Hospital in Khan Younis.
- Mai al-Kaila stated only eight hospitals in southern Gaza were "partially" functioning.
- WHO stated it had delivered supplies to Al-Shifa and El-Amal Hospitals.
- Gaza suffered a complete communications blackout. ActionAid stated it was "nearly impossible" for people to call or receive emergency services.

=== 28 December ===
- The Nasser Medical Complex in Khan Younis reported it was operating without 80 percent of its staff.
- The Palestinian Red Crescent condemned recent attacks in the vicinity of El-Amal Hospital, stating, "The occupations intensification in targeting the vicinity of al-Amal Hospital during the past few days may be considered a prelude to targeting it directly."
  - The Palestinian Red Crescent and the Egyptian Red Crescent Society announced they were setting up 300 tents to house the displaced families of medical, ambulance and relief staff.
- The director of operations of the Gaza Health Ministry stated 1.6 million people in Rafah were in need of medical care and that international intervention was needed.

=== 29 December ===
- The Gaza Government Media office stated 800,000 residents in northern Gaza had no access to hospitals, and that 7,000 people remained buried beneath rubble.
- The UN called the health system in Gaza "shattered" and said patients were just "waiting to die".
- South Africa filed a case against Israel at the International Court of Justice, alleging that Israel's conduct in Gaza amounted to genocide.

=== 30 December ===
- The World Health Organization stated 13 out of 36 Gaza hospitals were partially functional.
- The Gaza Health Ministry stated they had reopened Al Arabi Hospital, Patient Friend's Benevolent Society, Assahaba Medical Complex, and Al Helou International Hospital.
- An airstrike near European Hospital in Khan Younis killed five people.
- UNICEF stated it had delivered 600,000 childhood vaccine doses.

== January 2024 ==
=== 1 January ===
- Mai al-Kaila stated only nine hospitals were still operating in Gaza.

=== 2 January ===
- The Palestinian Red Crescent Society headquarters was bombed, killing five including a baby.
  - Gemma Connell, an UNOCHA representative, stated, "The world should be absolutely horrified. The world should be absolutely outraged a child was killed here today... the world should be ashamed."
- Tedros Ghebreyesus condemned Israel's attack on the al-Amal Hospital, stating, "Today's bombings are unconscionable Gaza's health system is already on its knees, with health and aid workers continuously stymied in their efforts to save lives due to the hostilities."

=== 3 January ===
- The Palestine Red Crescent Society reported Israeli attacks near the al-Amal Hospital were intensifying.
- The Gaza Health Ministry announced at least 128 Palestinians were killed by Israeli attacks in the past 24 hours, bringing the death toll to 22,313.

=== 4 January ===
- The Palestine Red Crescent Society stated Israel bombed the home of the Central Gaza Ambulance Center director.
  - The PRCS reported another attack on the al-Amal hospital, sending an appeal to the international community, Red Cross, and UN to protect its staff and patients. One person was killed in the shelling.
- Medical Aid for Palestinians and the International Rescue Committee released a joint statement stating Gaza's health system was "on the brink of catastrophic collapse".
- Doctors Without Borders stated Israeli bombing near Al-Aqsa hospital was creating dangerous conditions.
  - An MSF doctor stated, "We had to move our wound-dressing activities from the tent in the hospital courtyard to inside the premises to protect staff and patients. From the hospital, we can hear the bombing in the neighborhoods".
- The Gaza Health Ministry announced that 125 Palestinians were killed in Israeli attacks in the past 24 hours, bringing the death toll to 22,438.

=== 5 January ===
- Israeli shelling was reported near the al-Nasr Hospital.
- The International Federation of Red Cross and Red Crescent Societies condemned Israel's attacks on El Amal Hospital and the Palestinian Red Crescent headquarters.
  - A total of seven people were killed and eleven wounded.
- Doctors Without Borders set up a field hospital in Rafah, stating, "Staff are literally kneeling in blood on the floor to try to save the life of a person, even intubating on the floor."

=== 6 January ===
- A doctor at Al-Aqsa Hospital reported intense fighting getting close to the hospital, stating his fear the IDF would "do there what they did at Shifa and the Indonesian hospital".
- A displaced man was shot in the chest by an Israeli sniper in front of El Amal Hospital.
- The Gaza Health Ministry reported the operating rooms at al-Shifa hospital had reopened.

=== 7 January ===
- Gaza Media Office stated there were 6,000 wounded people waiting to be approved to receive treatment in Egypt.
- The Palestine Red Crescent Society reported they were using torches to treat wounded people.
- Medical Aid for Palestinians and the International Rescue Committee were forced to evacuate the Al-Aqsa Martyrs Hospital, with MAP stating, "The Israeli military has dropped leaflets designating areas surrounding the hospital as a 'red zone.'"
  - The Gaza Health Ministry stated Israeli drones were shooting at "anything that moves", and were aiming to disable the hospital.
- "Save the Children" reported that 13 out of Gaza's 36 hospitals remain partially functional.

=== 8 January ===
- Drones reportedly opened fire at people near Al-Aqsa Hospital.
  - A doctor at Al-Aqsa reported, "I had to deal with a child with multiple gunshots in his chest and one in the abdomen alone. I felt so bad because normally this child could have been saved. Finally we heard a lot of gunshots around and we had to leave everyone behind. And I literally cried because I didn't know what to do wondering what will happen to the people there."
  - Displaced people reportedly fled the vicinity of the hospital as fighting neared Al-Aqsa.
  - A Medical Aid for Palestinians doctor at Al-Aqsa Hospital stated, "There were several hundred people being admitted every day... There were scenes I'd never seen before in a hospital, and I've been a surgeon for many years and I've never seen anything like this."
  - A Doctors Without Borders doctor described the situation at Al -Aqsa as "catastrophic".
- The World Health Organization stated Israel had denied its request to deliver medical supplies, stating, "This marked the fourth denial of a mission to the al-Awda Hospital in Jabalia and Central Drug Store in Gaza City since December 26, leaving five hospitals in northern Gaza without access to life-saving medical supplies and equipment".
- Doctors Without Borders reported their staff and families, including a five-year-old girl, had been injured by Israeli shelling at an MSF shelter.

=== 9 January ===
- Doctors Without Borders condemned the prior day's Israeli attack on the MSF shelter, stating the five-year-old girl had died.
- In a social media post, UNRWA called for a ceasefire, stating, "Health system rapidly collapsing".
- The Palestine Red Crescent Society reported it had recovered the bodies of two people from the Maghazi camp.
- World Health Organization coordinator Sean Casey stated, "What we're seeing is really worrying around a lot of the hospitals and an intensification of hostilities, very close to the European Gaza Hospital. We are seeing the health system collapse at a very rapid pace."
- A nurse at Al-Aqsa stated most doctors had fled and patients arriving would not likely receive treatment.
- The Gaza Health Ministry reported that 126 Palestinians were killed in Israeli attacks in the past 24 hours, bringing the death toll to 23,210.

=== 10 January ===
- A doctor with Medical Aid for Palestinians stated Israeli attacks were making Al-Aqsa Hospital unusable, stating, "I think it's looking extremely likely that Al-Aqsa will become completely disabled as a healthcare facility".
  - Journalist Hind Khoudary visited Al-Aqsa Hospital, stating, "The hospital is crowded, it was chaos. You can't imagine the amount of blood I saw."
  - At least forty were killed in an Israel bombing near the Al-Aqsa entrance.
- The Palestinian Red Crescent reported an Israeli airstrike killed four paramedics and two patients in an ambulance, leading WHO chief Tedros Adhanom Ghebreyesus to state he was "appalled" by the attack.
  - The Red Crescent stated eleven of its paramedics had been killed by Israel since 7 October.
- WHO stated it had cancelled an aid mission to northern Gaza for the sixth time.
- In a social media post, UN humanitarian relief chief Martin Griffiths stated, "The health sector in Gaza is being slowly choked off as hospitals continue to come under fire."
- Red Cross director Robert Mardini stated all hospitals were suffering from the total collapse of the healthcare system, stating it was "unacceptable and dangerous".
- The Gaza Health Ministry stated it was investigating injuries caused by internationally banned weapons and warned 800,000 people in northern Gaza had been "sentenced to death" due to the collapse of the healthcare system.
- Generators at the International Medical Corps’ field hospital in Rafah were destroyed.

=== 11 January ===
- A former-Gaza Health Ministry official in Rafah stated he had converted his store into a makeshift medical clinic to help with the overflow of patients, receiving 30 to 40 patients a day.
- Stephane Dujarric stated three-quarters of Gaza's 77 primary health centres were no longer functioning, stating, "The ongoing hostilities in Deir el-Balah and Khan Younis – coupled with evacuation orders in nearby areas – are putting three hospitals at the risk of closures".
- Tedros Adhanom Ghebreyesus called on Israel to allow WHO access to northern Gaza, stating, "We have the supplies, the teams and the plans in place. What we don't have is access."
- UNOCHA reported only fifteen of Gaza's hospitals were still in operation.

=== 12 January ===
- The Al-Aqsa Hospital experienced a blackout after running out of fuel to power its generators.
- Newborn babies at were Al-Aqsa at risk due to the blackout.
- The Palestinian Red Crescent reported that a communications blackout was preventing medical workers from reaching injured people.
- A Doctors Without Borders representative stated, "We're gradually being cornered in a very restrictive perimeter in southern Gaza, in Rafah, with dwindling options to offer critical medical assistance, while the needs are desperately growing".
- Mai al-Kaila stated a shipment of polio vaccines and other medicines had arrived in Gaza.
- The UN stated Israel was blocking medical supplies to northern Gaza.
- The director of Khan Younis's ambulance center was released from Israeli custody after 51 days.

=== 13 January ===
- The Palestinian Red Crescent reported 180 women were giving birth per day in "inhumane conditions".
- The Red Crescent established mobile clinics in Rafah and Khan Younis to help with the overflow of patients in hospitals.
- The Gaza Health Ministry reported only six ambulances were operating in Gaza.
- Patients attempting to flee Al-Aqsa Hospital faced challenges evacuating due to Israel forces stationed a few hundred metres away.
  - A doctor at Al-Aqsa Hospital reported the challenges facing their premature babies during the blackout, stating doctors were trying to "find some blankets for the children and babies. They suffer from malnutrition. They can easily get sick, even die, God forbid."
  - Military attacks were conducted on the hospital.

=== 14 January ===
- The Palestine Red Crescent reported it had received 46 aid trucks of food, water, relief aid, and medical supplies.
  - The Red Crescent announced it had resumed emergency medical services in Gaza City.
- Tedros Adhanom Ghebreyesus called for the protection of Gaza's remaining hospitals.
- The Red Cross Secretary-General Jagan Chapagain wrote, "Civilian population in Gaza have suffered enough, and healthcare is one of the last remaining beacons of hope. It's a humanitarian and moral imperative to ensure the people of Gaza can access health care."
- Israeli troops opened fire on Palestinian civilians attempting to access the limited amount of humanitarian aid in Gaza.

=== 15 January ===
- UNRWA reported only six out of its 22 health facilities remained operational in Gaza.
- The Palestine Red Crescent Society stated it had resumed its 101 emergency call system.
- WHO stated Al-Aqsa was operating with only 10 percent of its staff, while Nasser Medical Complex was overflowing with double past its capacity.
- Dr. Mads Gilbert stated, "This is a systematic man-made disaster. This is planned and executed by the Israeli government with the full support from the US. It's the worst man-made medical disaster in modern history."

=== 16 January ===
- The Palestinian Red Crescent reported it had received 25 aid trucks from the Egyptian Red Crescent.
- Displaced peoples fled the Nasser Medical Complex as Israeli shelling approached.
- Medics in Khan Younis and Gaza City were struggling to reach wounded people due to intensive Israeli bombardment, meaning people remained trapped under rubble.
- Shelling from a nearby attack damaged the al-Amal hospital and created a "state of panic".
- The World Health Organization reported a rise in Hepatitis A cases in Gaza.
- The Health Ministry reported 350,000 chronically ill patients were deprived of medication.
- UNOCHA reported, "Lack of fuel for water, sanitation and hygiene increases risks of health and environmental hazards," while "Lack of medicine debilitated the functionality of the six partially functioning hospitals".
- The UN's OCHA reported that 378,000 people in Gaza were facing 'phase 5' or catastrophic levels of hunger and that 939,000 others were facing 'phase 4' or emergency levels of hunger.

=== 17 January ===
- Doctors Without Borders stated conditions at Nasser Medical Complex were "catastrophic" as displaced people fled nearby heavy Israeli bombardment.
- Amnesty International reported that the six-day communications blackout had put civilians at risk, as rescue services could not reach wounded people.
- Majed al-Ansari stated medical aid had entered the Gaza Strip.
- The Gaza Health Ministry said equipment for blood tests were running low.
- The Jordanian field hospital in Khan Younis was severely damaged by Israeli shelling.
- The Palestine Red Crescent Society said Israeli forces fired at ambulances trying to reach the burning vehicle.

=== 18 January ===
- A Doctors Without Borders doctor described conditions at Nasser Medical Complex as unbearable, stating, "You've got patients who are being operated on the floor. You've got patients who are sleeping on the floor. You have staff who are sleeping on the floor because they prefer to sleep in the hospital than to take the risk of going back and forth to their homes, which may or may not still exist."
- The Gaza Health Ministry stated the medical aid received only covered 30 percent of need.
- The Palestinian Red Crescent reported it had received a total of 5,939 trucks of aid and 88 ambulances since the war began.
- Doctors confirmed the spread of Hepatitis C in Rafah amongst displaced people.
- A World Health Organization representative stated, "I've seen children full of shrapnel dying on the floor because there are not the supplies in the emergency department, and the healthcare workers… to care for them".
- Salt was reportedly being put in wounds to be used as a disinfectant.
- Only fifteen of Gaza's hospital's remained partially operational, with a WHO representative stating, "Every time I went to the hospitals, I saw evidence, again and again, of the simultaneous humanitarian catastrophe that's unfolding".
- * The Palestinian foreign ministry accused Israel of committing 15 "massacres" killing 172 people in 24 hours under the cover of a communications blackout in the Gaza strip.

=== 19 January ===
- Jordan stated Israel had again targeted its field hospital, shooting inside at sheltering staff.
- A Doctors Without Borders doctor stated, "Our impact is very, very low because there are almost two million in people of need of health care. If you compare with the needs that there are, what we are doing is really a drop in the ocean."
- The Palestinian Red Crescent reported they were working to clean and repair Al-Quds Hospital in Gaza City after it sustained damage from Israeli attacks, stating, "The hospital suffered a fire, and a destruction of all its medical equipments and contents."
- As a non-functioning hospital, al-Shifa was reportedly being used as an evacuation center.
- The Red Crescent stated Israeli gunfire wounded displaced people at al-Amal hospital.
- A doctor was forced to amputate his own daughter's leg without anesthesia.
- UNICEF stated, "The situation of pregnant women and newborns in the Gaza Strip is beyond belief, and it demands intensified and immediate actions. The already precarious situation of infant and maternal mortality has worsened as the healthcare system collapses."
- Panic was reported within Nasser Medical Complex as Israeli soldiers neared.
- Tedros Adhanom Ghebreyesus stated, "The inhumane living conditions – barely any clean water, clean toilets and possibility to keep the surroundings clean – will enable Hepatitis A to spread further and highlight how explosively dangerous the environment is for the spread of disease."
- An Israeli air strike on an apartment block near the al-Shifa Hospital killed 12 people and injured more.

=== 20 January ===
- The UN Population Fund reported that staff in the Emirati Hospital were "operating far beyond their capacity with limited space, and women recovering from Cesarean births are discharged within a day".
- The number of hospitals still remaining in operation was reported to be "very limited".
- The Gaza Health Ministry stated, "The aid entering the Gaza Strip does not meet basic health needs. We try to differentiate between cases among the wounded and sick to save who we can."
- Airstrikes in Khan Younis were reportedly concentrated in the areas around Nasser Medical Complex and the Jordanian field hospital.

=== 21 January ===
- Doctors at Nasser Medical Complex expressed fears their hospital would undergo a siege similar to that at Al-Shifa, with the head of the burns department stating, "I pray to God that this will not happen… I know that Israel has already crossed all red lines… but this is the main hospital in the south of Gaza. I hope that this will not happen. If it happens, I cannot tell you how catastrophic it will be."
- Around 1,000 wounded people were being treated in a French field hospital off the coast of Egypt.

=== 22 January ===
- Israeli soldiers reportedly continued moving closer to Nasser Hospital.
- The Palestinian Red Crescent reported Nasser was under attack, like all other hospitals in southern Gaza.
- The Red Crescent also reported the IDF was attacking its ambulance center in Khan Younis, preventing paramedics from reaching wounded people.
  - The Red Crescent reported they had lost all contact with their Khan Younis ambulance team.
- The Gaza Health Ministry stated that Israeli soldiers had raided the al-Khair hospital and arrested medical staff.
- The Red Crescent reported at least 50 deaths from Israeli attacks in western Khan Yunis.
- the IDF reported 12,000 trucks with 1,052 tons of medical equipment have entered Gaza, including 431,126 vaccines. IDF reported active fields hospitals including: the Emirati, the Jordanian, the European, the IMC, the MSF, el Amal, Rafah, and plans for Red Cross field hospital. Additionally, French and Italian floating hospitals were active. Civilian aerial evacuations since November included 1,438 patients and 664 accompanying persons.

=== 23 January ===
- Doctors Without Borders reported that the neighborhood blocks surrounding and including Nasser Hospital had received IDF orders to evacuate.
- Martin Griffiths reported medics at Nasser Hospital remained working "while debris is falling on their heads".
- WHO reported it was able to deliver fuel to al-Shifa for the first time since 12 January. UNOCHA reported the hospital had effectively become a shelter for displaced people.
- Paramedics reported they were being prevented from accessing the bodies of the dead afters strikes in Khan Younis.
  - One medical staffer reported difficulties due to the city's destroyed roads and communications blackout.
- A Gaza Health Ministry spokesman stated Nasser Hospital was being isolated by the IDF.
- One person was killed and twelve people were wounded after an IDF attack on Al-Amal hospital.
- Doctors Without Borders staff reported patients at the European and Nasser Hospitals were dying while hospitalized due to unsanitary conditions and lack of staff.
- The Red Crescent stated, "We remain extremely worried regarding the safety of our units in Khan Younis. There has been a systematic targeting of PRCS premises, and of healthcare facilities by Israeli occupation forces since the start of the war."
- Tedros Adhanom Ghebreyesus stated he was deeply concerned about fighting near Al-Amal Hospital and Israel's raid on Al-Khair Hospital.
- Hamas urged the UN, Red Cross and World Health Organization to step in "immediately" and "shoulder their responsibilities" to stop Israel's attacks on Gaza's hospitals.

=== 24 January ===
- The Red Crescent reported the IDF had imposed a curfew on Al-Amal Hospital.
- The Gaza Health Ministry reported the Nasser Hospital was isolated, and an estimated 400 diabetic patients were unable to receive insulin treatment.
  - People fleeing Nasser were reportedly killed by Israeli tanks and drones.
- WHO reported seven hospitals in Northern Gaza and seven in Southern Gaza remained operational.
- The Gaza Civil Defense reported thousands had died due to the lack of first aid supplies.
- Three civilians were killed in an airstrike on the Palestine Red Crescent Society headquarters.
- Doctors Without Borders stated it was too dangerous to evacuate thousands of patients from Nasser.

=== 25 January ===
- The Gaza Health Ministry reported bombing near the Nasser Hospital.
  - Doctors at Nasser reported they were treating patients by flashlight.
- A WHO representative stated, "Many hospitals are not working, there is no specialised staff, there is no medicine, and in many instances it is simply impossible to reach hospitals because roads are damaged".
- The Environment Quality Authority stated two-thirds of Palestinians in the Gaza Strip were suffering from waterborne illness.
- The International Committee of the Red Cross stated, "The cumulative impact on the health system is devastating and urgent action must be taken."
- UNOCHA reported three hospitals and the Red Crescent ambulance center were besieged.
- Omar Abdel-Mannan, the co-founder of Gaza Medic Voices, said the triage system "has well and truly collapsed in Gaza".

=== 26 January ===
- Doctors Without Borders stated that there is "no longer a healthcare system in Gaza".
- The Palestinian Red Crescent reported a third day of bombing around its headquarters.
- A Gaza Health Ministry spokesman stated Israel was deliberately paralyzing Al-Amal and Nasser Hospitals.
- UNRWA reported a rise in hepatitis A in camps for internally displaced persons.
- The gate of Al-Amal Hospital was reportedly hit by Israeli tank fire.
- The Health Ministry stated Nasser hospital was out of food, anaesthetics, and painkillers, stating, "There are 150 health personnel, 350 patients, and hundreds of displaced families in the Nasser Medical Complex in catastrophic conditions of starvation, targeting, and lack of treatment".
- A volunteer with the Medical Emergency Rescue Committee stated, "Everything is limited, including clean water, food and aid trucks, which Israeli forces won't let enter through Rafah."
- The Red Crescent removed a 1 kg (2.2 pounds) piece of shrapnel from a man's shoulder.
- WHO spokesperson Tarik Jasarevic stated, "There is no medicines, and in many instances, it's simply impossible to reach hospitals."
- The Palestinian Red Crescent reported a third day of bombing around its headquarters.
- The International Court of Justice issued a ruling on South Africa's genocide case against Israel over the Gaza conflict, ordering the latter to do all it can to prevent death, destruction and acts of genocide. However, it did not order Israel to stop military operations there.

=== 27 January ===
- The CEO of the International Federation of Red Cross stated, "Heavy fighting continue to escalate in the surroundings of Palestine Red Crescent Al-Amal Hospital in Khan Yunis, resulting in several injuries and hindering PRCS teams from reaching those in need."
- Snipers outside al-Amal Hospital were reportedly preventing anyone from leaving the hospital.
- A director at Nasser Hospital stated 95 percent of staff had evacuated.
- The Gaza Health Ministry stated that Israeli drone fire had destroyed Nasser's water tanks.
- The Red Crescent condemned Israel's attacks on al-Amal hospital.
- Hezbollah conducted 14 attacks primarily targeting Israeli military forces and infrastructure.

=== 28 January ===
- The Gaza Ministry of Health reported an accumulation of medical and non-medical waste at Nasser Hospital.
  - The Ministry further reported that Nasser lacked anaesthesia and was dangerously low on blood.
- Children were buried in a mass grave at Nasser Hospital.
- The Palestinian Red Crescent stated its teams at al-Amal hospital were unable to perform surgeries due to a lack of oxygen.

=== 29 January ===
- The CEO of the International Federation of Red Cross and Red Crescent Societies stated his key concerns were "the health system on the brink of collapse, the alarming spread of diseases and the risk of famine increasing daily."
- The head of the burns department at Nasser Hospital stated, "If Israeli forces start to move into the hospital, the patients will remain in their beds until they die. It's like an execution sentence."
- A doctor at the Gaza European Hospital stated, "The health system in Gaza is collapsed, and we're doing our best to save lives."
- At least ten rockets were fired toward central Israel.

=== 30 January ===
- Doctors Without Borders delivered 19,000 litres (5,000 gallons) of fuel to al-Shifa Hospital.
- The Palestinian Red Crescent reported that IDF tanks had raided the al-Amal Hospital, forced displaced people to evacuate immediately, and burned down their tents.
- The Palestinian Red Crescent lost contact with a team attempting to rescue a six-year-old girl.
- Mai al-Kaila warned that Gaza was at risk of the rapid spread of epidemics.
- Israeli forces conducted a raid dressed in civilian clothes on Ibn Sina Specialized Hospital in Jenin, West Bank.

=== 31 January ===
- The Gaza Ministry of Health reported that both the Nasser Medical Complex and Al Amal Hospital had run out of food.
- The Al Amal hospital was reportedly completely out of service.
- The Gaza Health Ministry reported that 150 Palestinians were killed in Israeli attacks in the past 24 hours, bringing the death toll to 26,900.
- Palestinian officials accused Israel of further summary killings after a mass grave was discovered, that containing the bodies of 30 people that had been shot dead whilst blindfolded and with their hands bound.
- Armed Israeli settlers injured two Palestinian children near the village of Susya, south of Hebron.

== February 2024 ==
=== 1 February ===
- WHO stated it had provided UNRWA with an early warning system to detect disease outbreak in emergency settings.
- An MSF doctor reported that the scenes around Nasser were "catastrophic" and "one of the most devastating things" he'd ever seen before.
- Paramedics reported difficulty rescuing people due to the intensity of fighting in Khan Younis.
- The Tubas Battalion of Hamas and the Tubas Battalion of the al Aqsa Martyrs’ Brigades conducted multiple attacks on Israeli forces during an Israeli raid in the city.

=== 2 February ===
- The UN reported that both Nasser and Al-Amal hospitals were facing a "serious shortage of oxygen".
- The Gaza Health Ministry reported that 112 Palestinians were killed in Israeli attacks in the past 24 hours, bringing the death toll to 27,131.

=== 4 February ===
- The Palestinian Red Crescent stated food and fuel at al-Amal hospital were depleted and that "medical supplies and medicines are at zero stock, with a significant shortage of essential drugs for chronic diseases".

=== 5 February ===
- Displaced people at al-Amal hospital were given a safe corridor to flee to Rafah.
  - The Red Crescent stated 8,000 people evacuated.

=== 6 February ===
- The Palestinian Society for Haemophilia stated only 4 out of 200 registered hemophiliacs had been evacuated from Gaza.
- The Gaza Health Ministry stated that electric generators at Nasser Hospital would run out of fuel within days, as the situation deteriorated and food ran out.
- The Red Crescent reported that al-Amal hospital was out of fuel, oxygen and all medical supplies, and that 43 people had been killed since the start of Israel's siege.
- WHO reported a "rapid deterioration of al-Shifa Hospital due to intensifying hostilities".

=== 7 February ===
- The Gaza Health Ministry stated 11,000 people were in urgent need of a medical evacuation.
- UNOCHA reported Nasser Hospital had only four days of fuel remaining in its reserves.

=== 8 February ===
- WHO stated that al-Shifa hospital was operating under "minimal functionality" due to nearby fighting.
- Norway's Minister of International Development Anne Beathe Tvinnereim stated, "Health services have collapsed. In addition to all of the ramifications of the war, many are dying from infectious diseases and a lack of healthcare."

=== 9 February ===
- Israeli forces raided Al-Amal hospital.
- The Palestinian Red Crescent Society stated it had completely lost contact with its teams at Al-Amal hospital.

=== 11 February ===
- The Palestine Red Crescent Society stated three patients had died at Al-Amal hospital due to Israeli forces preventing oxygen supplies from reaching the hospital.

=== 12 February ===
- A doctor at the Gaza European Hospital stated conditions at the hospital were a "total disaster" and that "the health system in Gaza has collapsed".

=== 13 February ===
- A Doctors Without Borders doctor described the deteriorating conditions in Rafah ahead of the planned Israeli invasion, stating, "We will all die, all of us. Hopefully soon enough to stop the suffering that we are living through every single second."
- The World Health Organization stated there were 20,000 people sheltering at Gaza European Hospital and described it as "overwhelmed, overcrowded and undersupplied".
- A fire near the Nasser Hospital spread to the medical equipment store, burning 80 percent of its medical supplies.
- A 10-year-old died after Nasser ran out of fuel to power its generator.

=== 14 February ===
- The World Health Organization stated Israel had denied the group access to Nasser Hospital since 29 January, despite reports of civilian casualties.
- A doctor at the European Hospital in Khan Younis stated, "The whole system has collapsed. We are losing a lot of patients, most of the time because of the lack of equipment and medical staff."

=== 15 February ===
- UNOCHA stated, "Al Amal Hospital continues to contend with acute shortages of fuel and medical supplies and currently has only one functional operating room".
- WHO stated there were no fully functioning hospitals remaining in the Gaza Strip.

=== 16 February ===
- An American doctor working in Gaza stated, "This morning I had to do surgery without any gowns, I had to do it in my scrubs. I've seen patients with minor burns that end up dying just because there's no care, nothing is available to provide them with care. You walk into the ward and we are practising 18th-century medicine here."
- The Gaza Health Ministry reported that 112 Palestinians were killed in Israeli attacks in the past 24 hours, bringing the death toll to 28,775.

=== 17 February ===
- The Gaza Media Office stated there were 11,000 injured people in need of treatment abroad, 700,000 people with infectious diseases, 60,000 at-risk pregnant women, 350,000 chronically ill people lacking medication, and 10,000 cancer patients without treatment.
- The executive director of United Palestinian Appeal stated the organization was exploring telemedicine and mobile service options, but electricity was increasingly scarce.
- The country director of Women for Women International for Palestine stated lack of clean water and sanitation had led to disease outbreaks such as diarrhea, due to poor hygiene scabies, lice and skin rashes were increasing, and dialysis patients and thousands of female cancer patients had no access to treatment.
- The Gaza Health Ministry stated that 22 clinics, governmental or UNRWA, were working.

=== 18 February ===
- On 18 February, the World Health Organization said Nasser Hospital could no longer serve its patients, and that the hospital was no longer functional. Tedros Adhanom Ghebreyesus attributed the hospital's inability to continue operating to the Israeli siege and raid.
- Yousef Al Otaiba, the UAE ambassador to the United States wrote, "The medical system has collapsed."
- A field hospital was set up in Rafah.
- Jagan Chapagain, the secretary-general and CEO of the International Federation of Red Cross and Red Crescent Societies, stated that the healthcare situation in Gaza was "beyond critical".
- Al-Amal hospital was shelled by the Israeli military.

=== 19 February ===
- WHO representative Rik Peeperkorn stated, "The degradation of health services needs to stop. A number of countries in the region and even in Europe have reached out and are willing to accept patients. We estimate that at least 8,000 patients need to be referred out of Gaza."

=== 20 February ===
- UNRWA stated only seven of its 23 health facilities in southern and central Gaza were still operational.
- The deputy director of the Al-Helal Al-Emairati Maternity Hospital in Rafah stated several premature babies had died in the hospital and said that the "health sector has been completely destroyed."
- The Al-Aqsa Hospital, the only remaining hospital in the Deir el-Balah area, was reportedly overwhelmed by patients.

=== 21 February ===
- An Australian medical staffer with Doctors Without Borders stated, "Everyone here is struggling, and it is a situation where we have victims caring for victims. There is no one here who does not need help."

=== 22 February ===
- Chris Lockyear, the director of Doctors Without Borders, spoke to the United Nations Security Council, stating, "There is no health system to speak of left in Gaza. Israel's military has dismantled hospital after hospital. What remains is so little in the face of such carnage".
- Doctors at al-Shifa reported conditions were getting "worse and worse, day by day".

=== 23 February ===
- The Gaza Health Ministry stated 350,000 chronic patients, 60,000 pregnant women, and 700,000 children in Gaza were facing severe health complications due to malnutrition, dehydration, and the collapse of the healthcare system.
- Doctors Without Borders stated Israel was conducting a "war without limits".
- The London School of Hygiene and Tropical Medicine and the Johns Hopkins Center for Humanitarian Health at Johns Hopkins University found the war continuing at status quo would result in between 58,260 and 74,290 excess deaths.

=== 24 February ===
- Doctors at al-Aqsa Hospital reported being overwhelmed by the large number of patients coming after strikes on Deir el-Balah.
- A doctor who had served both in the Russian invasion of Ukraine and in Gaza, stated, "In Ukraine, hospitals are many in number and large in size and well equipped. That is why survival odds, for both medical staff and the wounded are high. In Gaza, it is completely the opposite."

=== 25 February ===
- No operational health facilities remained in Khan Younis.

=== 26 February ===
- Doctors Without Borders reported their staff were building their own medical equipment due to the severe lack of medical supplies remaining in Gaza.
- The Palestinian Red Crescent announced they were suspending all medical missions for 48 hours due to their inability to guarantee the safety of their staff.

=== 27 February ===
- The Palestinian Red Crescent reported hundreds of people in Jabalia were showing signs of infectious diseases.
- The UNHRC reported the Al-Awda Hospital announced it was "partially ceasing operations due to lack of fuel, electricity and medical supplies."

=== 28 February ===
- A Doctors Without Borders director stated, "Healthcare has been attacked, it's collapsing. The whole system is collapsing. We are working from tents trying to do what we can."
- Kamal Adwan Hospital was announced to be completely out of service.
- Al-Awda Hospital, the last functional hospital in northern Gaza, announced it was suspending all medical services due to a lack of fuel or medical supplies.
- Six Palestinian children (in Gaza) have lost their lives due to malnutrition. There have been warnings that a significant number of Palestinians could face starvation in the coming days as a direct consequence of the Israeli blockade.

=== 29 February ===
- The Palestinian Red Crescent stated that many victims of the Al-Rashid massacre would not receive adequate treatment because "the numbers were beyond our capacity. As we speak, the entire health sector in Gaza is collapsing, it has run out of fuel."
- Due to a lack of medical supplies and medical staff, cases at Kamal Adwan Hospital, the Indonesian Hospital, and al-Shifa Hospital of patients dying before being seen by staff were reported.
- In the Al-Rashid humanitarian aid incident, also known as Flour Massacre, at least 118 Palestinian civilians died and at least 760 were injured when Israel Defense Forces opened fire at an aid site. Some died from gunshot wounds, some from mass panic.

== March 2024 ==
=== 1 March ===
- WHO spokesperson Christian Lindmeier stated, "The system in Gaza is on its knees. It's more than on its knees. All the lifelines in Gaza have more or less been cut."

=== 3 March ===
- The Palestinian Red Crescent reported the al-Amal hospital was running out of supplies, stating, "Continuous shelling and gunfire around the hospital or directly targeting it endanger the safety of patients and medical teams".

=== 4 March ===
- A Canadian doctor returning from two weeks in Gaza reported significant cases of "communicable disease, such as respiratory infections and gastrointestinal disease, including a major outbreak of Hepatitis A".
- After the World Health Organization visited al-Awda and Kamal Adwan hospitals, Tedros Adhanom Ghebreyesus reported "severe levels of malnutrition, children dying of starvation, serious shortages of fuel, food and medical supplies, hospital buildings destroyed".

=== 6 March ===
- The World Health Organization stated 8,000 wounded people in Gaza needed referrals to receive treatment outside of Gaza.

=== 9 March ===
- WHO chief Tedros Adhanom Ghebreyesus stated, "Almost 31,000 people have lost their lives, 72,000+ have been injured, thousands are missing. 406 attacks on health care, 118 health workers are in detention, 1 in 3 hospitals is only partially or minimally functional. When is enough enough?"

=== 10 March ===
- The Al-Aqsa Martyrs Hospital reported they could not accept new patients due to a lack of medical supplies, stating they could no longer provide quality care.

=== 11 March ===
- UNOCHA reported that al-Ahli Hospital and the Sahaba Hospital in Gaza City were overwhelmed by structural damaged, understaffing, and being undersupplied.
- The Gaza Health Ministry stated that 2,000 of its medical staff in northern Gaza faced starvation due to famine.
- WHO delivered medical supplies, food, and 24,050 liters of fuel to Al-Shifa Hospital.
- Diabetic patients reported difficulty finding and receiving dialysis treatment due to shortages of supplies and staff.

=== 14 March ===
- UNRWA stated 12 hospitals remained partially operational in Gaza, with only two offering maternity care.

=== 16 March ===
- The head of the International Federation of Red Cross and Red Crescent Societies stated, "The healthcare situation is on the brink of collapse with hospitals facing desperate conditions".
- A staff member with Doctors Without Borders, stated, "The current situation in Gaza is catastrophic and words can't describe it".
- Dr. James Smith, a former staff at Al-Aqsa Hospital, stated the healthcare system collapsed in late-October 2023 and hadn't recovered due to "supplies, resources, specialists and so on required have either not entered into Gaza or where such commodities or resources made available, it is impossible to work in a context of such extreme violence and insecurity".

=== 17 March ===
- Doctors in Rafah reported difficulties providing care, with one medical volunteer stating, "It's impossible for medical facilities to accommodate this number of patients. We're operating in a camp housing around 1.5 million people. We receive medications to cover a week, but they run out in just one day".

=== 18 March ===
- Israel launched a raid on Al Shifa Hospital.

=== 19 March ===
- Dr. Nick Maynard, a British doctor who worked in Gaza, stated, "What I saw at al-Aqsa Hospital was the worst cases in my 30-year career. Appalling clinical injuries, mostly upon children and women. Terrible burns, traumatic wounds, and no real room to deal with these tragic cases."

=== 20 March ===
- Doctors from the US, UK and France who were involved in humanitarian missions in Gaza in recent months accused Israeli Defense Forces of systematically targeting healthcare facilities in Gaza and "dismantling the whole healthcare system". Professor Nick Maynard, formerly director for cancer services at Oxford University, said: "It's not just about targeting the buildings, it's about systematically destroying the infrastructure of the hospitals. Destroying the oxygen tanks at the al-Shifa hospital, deliberately destroying the CT scanners and making it much more difficult to rebuild that infrastructure. If it was just targeting Hamas militants, why are they deliberately destroying the infrastructure of these institutions?" Maynard said he had witnessed the indiscriminate killing of countless innocent civilians and had performed operations continuously for a fortnight, far more often on women than on men. He recalled seeing appalling burns and amputations on children, including a girl who had such severe burns that her facial bones were visible: "We knew there was no chance of her surviving that but there was no morphine to give her. So not only was she inevitably going to die but she would die in agony." In fact, Maynard added, the girl died lying on the hospital floor, as there was not even a bed available for her.

=== 21 March ===
- The World Health Organization announced the creation of nutrition stabilisation centres at Kamal Adwan Hospital in northern Gaza, and a second one in Rafah.
- 25 patients were ordered to be "returned" to Gaza from East Jerusalem.

=== 22 March ===
- Jamie McGoldrick, the UN aid coordinator for Palestine, stated the Kamal Adwan Hospital was reaching its breaking point, stating, "They’re really struggling to provide the services required for the patients coming in, especially children".

=== 25 March ===
- A surgeon at the European Gaza Hospital stated that staff were "managing with the bare minimum of resources".
  - An anesthetist working with a medical team consisting of Medical Aid for Palestinians, the International Rescue Committee, and the Palestine Children's Relief Fund stated, "There are around 22,000 displaced people sheltering in the corridors and in tents inside the hospital because people feel that it’s safer to be here than anywhere else."
- Three hospitals — al-Shifa Hospital, al-Amal, and Nasser hospitals — were besieged by Israeli forces.

=== 27 March ===
- Hospitals in northern Gaza were running low on food, water and medical supplies.

=== 28 March ===
- WHO deployed an emergency medical team to Kamal Adwan Hospital, including two surgeons, a doctor, and an anesthetist.
  - WHO stated only 10 out of 36 hospitals remained operational.
- The al-Aqsa Martyrs Hospital treated 800 patients despite only having 160 beds.
- The International Federation of the Red Cross stated northern Gaza's healthcare system "has been largely destroyed".

=== 30 March ===
- WHO stated 9,000 patients need to be evacuated from Gaza to receive the necessary medical treatment.

=== 31 March ===
- The Gaza Health Ministry reported that at least 77 Palestinians were killed in Israeli attacks in the past 24 hours, bringing the death toll to 32,782.
- At least four Palestinians were injured in an attack by Israeli forces on Rashayida, north of Jericho.
- At least 4 people were killed and 18 injured during an Israeli airstrike on the courtyard of the Al-Aqsa Martyrs Hospital.

== April 2024 ==
=== 1 April ===
- Al Jazeera English reported that only four hospitals were "providing medical treatment for more than 85 percent of Gaza’s population."
- The Gaza Health Ministry stated, "The health system has been subjected to repeated and direct targeting, which has brought the health system to almost complete paralysis".
- Israeli military forces targeted a World Central Kitchen convoy in Gaza, leading to the tragic loss of seven aid workers' lives.

=== 16 April ===
- A senior International Rescue Committee adviser stated, "No hospitals in Gaza are fully functioning any longer. IRC staff and partners in Gaza continue to witness devastation in the health facilities that are left".

=== 22 April ===
- Tlaleng Mofokeng, the UN special rapporteur on the right to health, stated, "The health system in Gaza has been completely obliterated, and the right to health has been decimated at every level".
- The Gaza Health Ministry stated a ground invasion of Rafah would eliminate "what little remains of the healthcare system and depriving the population of any health services".

=== 24 April ===
- The director of the Kuwaiti hospital in Rafah stated, "Rafah governorate has become a continuous target... The Israeli occupation uses internationally prohibited weapons, and the type of injuries we receive is unprecedented, such as amputation of limbs and laceration of the body".
- The Palestinian Centre for Human Rights stated that 300 people, including 80 children, were suffering from thalassemia due to a lack of medication.
- The Gaza Health Ministry reported an increase in hepatitis and meningitis cases and called for support from "all relevant national, international and humanitarian institutions".
- COGAT reported that since 7 October, more than 21500 tons of medical supplies entered the Gaza Strip, 416 medical personnel entered, over 2.5 million vaccines distributed, 127 ambulances donated, and 3259 patients left the Gaza Strip for medical treatment.

== May 2024 ==
=== 1 May ===
- The Palestinian Red Crescent stated that it was establishing a field hospital with Egypt and Kuwait in the Al-Mawasi area near Khan Younis.
- WHO stated it was attempting to restore partial functionality at Nasser Hospital.

=== 2 May ===
- WHO stated it was establishing a field hospital in Al-Mawasi and medical warehouse in Deir al-Balah as part of contingency plan for Israel's planned Rafah offensive.

=== 3 May ===
- The Palestinian Red Crescent stated that rising temperatures and accumulating sewage waste were leading to the spread of Hepatitis A.
- WHO stated, "Only 33 percent of Gaza’s 36 hospitals and 30 percent of primary healthcare centres are functional in some capacity amid repeated attacks and shortages of vital medical supplies, fuel, and staff".
- Doctors Without Borders reported Israel was rejecting "ultrasound scanners to external defibrillators, generators, and intravenous sodium chloride solutions that are essential for rehydrating patients and diluting drugs" from entering Gaza.

=== 7 May ===
- Following the beginning of Israel's Rafah offensive, Doctors Without Borders stated it was relocating staff to Nasser Hospital.
- UNOCHA reported that Rafah's largest hospital, Abu Youssef An Najjar Hospital, had been vacated due to on evacuation.

=== 8 May ===
- The United Nations Population Fund stated that Rafah's main maternity hospital had stopped admitting patients.
- The World Health Organization warned of impending fuel shortages, with Tedros Adhanom Ghebreyesus, stating, "Without fuel all humanitarian operations will stop. Border closures are also impeding delivery of humanitarian aid into Gaza".

=== 9 May ===
- The director of Kuwaiti Hospital reported a lack of doctors at the hospital, stating, "There are no words to express the catastrophe of what we are experiencing today".

=== 10 May ===
- The UN humanitarian office stated five hospitals and five field hospitals would shut down if Israel did not allow fuel to enter into Gaza. It stated, "Without fuel to run generators, there is a critical risk of losing patients in Intensive Care Units (ICU), including newborns in neonatal ICUs, trauma patients requiring emergency surgeries and pregnant women in need of caesarian sections (C-sections)."
- Patients were forced out of hospitals in Rafah, with one doctor stating, "We have no beds, no hospitals to refer, especially for critical patients".

=== 11 May ===
- New Field hospital established by IDF and COGAT in Deir al-Balah (central Gaza), providing medicines, beds, food, water, tents, first aid equipment, ventilators via the Kerem Shalom Crossing, and operated by 150 international medical aid workers.

=== 12 May ===
- Gaza Civil Defence stated no hospitals in northern Gaza remained in operation.

=== 13 May ===
- Following Israel's closure of the Rafah crossing and the launch of its Rafah offensive, a Gaza health official stated, "The wounded and sick suffer a slow death because there is no treatment and supplies and they cannot travel."
- Israel ordered the evacuation of the Kuwaiti Hospital in Rafah.

=== 14 May ===
- Médecins Sans Frontières stopped providing healthcare at the Rafah Indonesian Field Hospital.

=== 15 May ===
- Families stated they were unable to evacuate their wounded children due to the closing of Rafah crossing.

=== 17 May ===
- Seventeen U.S. doctors were evacuated from the Gaza Strip.
- WHO stated they had not received medical supplies into Gaza in ten days.

=== 18 May ===
- Adam Hamawy, the doctor credited with saving Senator Tammy Duckworth's life, stated, "I have never in my career witnessed the level of atrocities and targeting of my medical colleagues as I have in Gaza. I want our President to know that we are not safe".

=== 19 May ===
- Doctors Without Borders stated the Al-Awda hospital had run out of drinking water.
- Gaza's Government Media Office stated 690 sick and wounded people were being prevented from leaving Gaza.

=== 21 May ===
- UNRWA's deputy director stated Israel evacuation order has resulted in the shutdown of two health centers in Rafah.

=== 22 May ===
- The Gaza Government Media Office stated there were no remaining health services in Gaza's northern governates.

=== 23 May ===
- The Gaza Health Ministry stated the Al-Aqsa Hospital would soon run out of fuel.
- A 21-year-old medic stated, "There is no support for medics in Gaza... We need to stay in the hospitals".
- Doctors reported patients with maggot infested wounds that were not healing, due to a lack of medications.

=== 24 May ===
- The Al-Aqsa Hospital faced severe fuel shortages, with the hospital spokesman stating, "This will lead to the death of so many sick and wounded people".

=== 25 May ===
- The Gaza Health Ministry stated 20,000 patients with life-threatening conditions were prevented from leaving Gaza.

=== 26 May ===
- A British surgeon who returned from Gaza said hospitals there were practicing "medieval medicine" and that injured people try to avoid going to hospitals because it "means pretty much a death sentence".

=== 28 May ===
- Field hospitals in Rafah were forced to evacuate as fighting neared the city center.

=== 29 May ===
- The Palestinian Health Ministry stated artillery shelling was preventing patients from reaching the Emirati hospital in Rafah.
- The Al-Quds Field Hospital was forced to evacuate due to nearby Israeli artillery and bombardment.

=== 30 May ===
- Doctors Without Borders stated they had closed a primary care facility in al-Mawasi, stating, "This is the second health facility we have been forced to close this week and another step in Israel’s systematic dismantling of Gaza’s health system."
- The World Health Organization stated that medical officials stated an "overwhelming disaster" as medical supplies dwindled.
- WHO stated the Al-Helal al-Emirati Hospital, Rafah's last remaining hospital, had gone out of service.

=== 31 May ===
- Dr. James Smith, a British doctor working in Gaza, stated the healthcare system in Gaza was "completely decimated".

== June 2024 ==
=== 3 June ===
- Staff at the Al-Aqsa Hospital issued an "urgent appeal" to the international community "to save Gaza’s health system".
- WHO stated that between 7,000 and more than 11,000 patients need immediate medical evacuation.

=== 4 June ===
- Administrators at the Al-Aqsa Hospital stated that one of the two hospital's generators had gone out of service.
  - The number of patients at Al-Aqsa Hospital was described as "beyond imagination."
- Doctors Without Borders stated, "With the insane escalation of violence in various locations in the Gaza Strip over the last 48 hours, and while the Rafah crossing point has remained closed for a month, the health system has been stretched to the point of collapse. The situation is apocalyptic."
- Action Against Hunger stated that piled up waste was increasing the risk of diseases in the summer.
- The Red Crescent stated Israeli forces burned its medical supplies in Jabalia.

=== 6 June ===
- Doctors Without Borders warned about conditions at Al-Aqsa Hospital, stating, "As Israeli military strikes continued last night in the Middle Area, al-Aqsa Hospital is barely coping with the influx of patients and dead people. It’s a scene of devastation. This hospital is a sinking ship."

=== 10 June ===
- An emergency room physician who worked in Gaza earlier in the year stated fuel shortages are putting hospitals at "catastrophic" risk.
- A doctor at Al-Aqsa Martyrs Hospital stated, "We placed the injured along the internal corridors and in between beds. There is no room at all inside this hospital. We had them sleep in external tents".

=== 12 June ===
- Gaza's Ministry of Health stated that hospitals and health centers in Gaza City were at risk of shutting down due to a lack of fuel.

=== 13 June ===
- The Palestine Red Crescent Society reopened a medical post in Jabalia.

=== 14 June ===
- The Indonesia Hospital re-opened as the only medical facility in northern Gaza.

=== 15 June ===
- UNRWA stated less than one-third of their health facilities in Gaza remained operational, stating, "Hospitals in ruin, restrictions on humanitarian access and scarce medical supplies and fuel across Gaza are pushing the health situation beyond crisis level".
- Doctors Without Borders staff stated they were unable to find food, with a logistician stating his family had looked even for bird feed.

=== 17 June ===
- The Islamic Health Committee, affiliated with Hezbollah, has issued a recent statement denouncing the Israeli assault on a civil defense center in Hanin, Lebanon. This attack led to the tragic deaths of two of the center's staff members. The committee strongly condemned the assault, emphasizing that it targeted a crucial facility that offers essential services to the community.

=== 20 June ===
- Doctors Without Borders stated addressing psychological trauma was not possible while the conflict was ongoing.
- Human Rights Watch stated, "People in Gaza have told us that the dead are the lucky ones, because the wounded suffer so acutely due to the Israeli authorities’ blockade of lifesaving aid."

=== 21 June ===
- Doctors Without Borders stated that without "a significant refill of medical supplies in the coming days" it would need to stop or reduce its Gaza operations.
- Dr. Husam Abu Safyia, the director of Kamal Adwan Hospital, stated illnesses were spreading throughout Gaza as trash piled up.

=== 27 June ===
- 68 sick and injured children were evacuated from Gaza, the first to be evacuated since the beginning of May.
- The World Health Organization stated 10,000 patients were in need of immediate evacuation.
- A lack of available fuel resulted in one-third of the Palestinian Red Crescent's ambulances being put out of service.

=== 30 June ===
- The Palestinian Red Crescent evacuated their temporary administrative headquarters in Khan Younis following Israeli attacks.

== July 2024 ==
=== 1 July ===
- The Gaza European Hospital, one of Gaza's last remaining hospitals, was included in an evacuation area order by the Israeli government.

=== 2 July ===
- The Palestinian Red Crescent stated the Al-Amal Hospital was overcrowded with patients following the evacuation and transfer of patients from the European Gaza Hospital.

=== 3 July ===
- WHO chief Tedros Adhanom Ghebreyesus stated the Gaza European Hospital was "completely empty", after the hospital cancelled all scheduled surgeries and evacuated its staff and 400 patients.

=== 5 July ===
- Doctors Without Borders warned the Nasser Hospital was at risk of being overwhelmed following the evacuation of the Gaza European Hospital.
- The World Health Organization stated fuel shortages risked "catastrophic" impacts on Gaza's remaining hospitals.

=== 6 July ===
- The Gaza Ministry of Health has said that the continuation of the fuel crisis has suspended the work of other health institutions operating in Gaza.
- The Ministry of Health in Gaza has reported that 29 individuals lost their lives in Gaza within the last day, with news surfacing that five Palestinian journalists were among the casualties. Since 7 October, a total of 38,098 individuals have lost their lives and 87,705 have sustained injuries as a result of Israel's military campaign in Gaza.

=== 7 July ===
- According to the Health Ministry in Gaza, the number of casualties from Israeli attacks has reached 38,153 deaths and 87,828 injuries since 7 October. In the last 24 hours, 55 Palestinians were killed and 123 were wounded.

=== 9 July ===
- UNRWA reopened a health center in Khan Younis that had been previously damaged by heavy fighting.
- The World Health Organization spokesperson Tarik Jasarevic stated only 13 out of 36 hospitals were partially functioning.

=== 11 July ===
- The Indonesian hospital, northern Gaza's last functioning hospital, was overwhelmed by patients and its lack of medical supplies.
- Only five World Health Organization trucks were allowed into Gaza in the week prior.

=== 13 July ===
- Staff at the Nasser Medical Complex stated the hospital was no longer operational.

=== 15 July ===
- The Anglican Diocese of Jerusalem stated the Al Ahli Hospital had resumed operations "despite intense military activity in the area".
- A senior Red Cross official stated conditions in Gaza were dire, due to severe hunger and a lack of supplies.

=== 18 July ===
- Netanyahu blocked the creation of a children's field hospital in Israel.
- The International Committee of the Red Cross stated southern Gaza's medical facilities had reached their breaking point.

=== 24 July ===
- Starlink was activated at the UAE field hospital in Gaza.

=== 30 July ===
- WHO and the United Arab Emirates evacuated 85 sick and injured patients to Abu Dhabi.

== August 2024 ==
=== 19 August ===
- Gaza's first recorded case of polio was recorded.
- Lack of fuel threatened the continuation of Gaza's ambulance operations.

== September 2024 ==
- UNRWA reopened a dental clinic in southern Gaza.

== 2025 ==
=== 13 April ===
- Israel destroyed part of the last fully functional hospital in Gaza City, the Al-Ahli Arab Baptist Hospital, which is managed by the Episcopal Church in Jerusalem. No direct casualties were reported, but one child died due to interrupted medical care.

=== 25 August 2025 strikes ===
On 25 August 2025, an Israel Defense Forces double tap strike hit the Nasser Hospital in Khan Yunis, Gaza Strip, killing 22 people, including 5 journalists.

== 2026 ==
=== November 2026 ===
Gaza's Government Media Office reported that 793 Israeli attacks had targeted healthcare services in the Gaza Strip since October 2023, resulting in the deaths of 1,725 healthcare workers. The reported incidents included attacks on medical facilities, ambulances, healthcare personnel and medical supply chains. Separately, Al Jazeera cited an Insecurity Insight report documenting at least 3,508 attacks on healthcare across the occupied Palestinian territory between October 2023 and September 2026, 95% of which were attributed to Israeli forces.

In November 2026, Israelis were continuing to block the entry of medical supplies into the Gaza Strip. SBS News spoke to an Australian doctor who recently returned from a deployment at Nasser Hospital, she said that her own health has suffered due to limited food supplies.

==== 12 November airstrike on Nasser Hospital ====
At 12:30 am on Thursday 12 November 2026, an Israeli airstrike hit the hospital, despite a ceasefire being in place. The airstrike killed six people. The fatalities included general surgery specialist Dr Rezq Abu Shaeera and a 13-year-old child. As of 13 November 2026, 52 people had been reported injured. The Israel Defense Forces (IDF) and Shin Bet released a joint statement claiming responsibility for the attack on the hospital. Additionally confessing that the attack was intended to kill someone in the hospital, and their intended target was Muhammad Abu Ismail, whom they described as "the commander of Hamas' Khan Younis Brigade".

== See also ==
- 2024 Gaza Strip polio outbreak
- Israeli bombing of the Gaza Strip
- Attacks on health facilities during the Gaza war
  - Al-Shifa Hospital siege
  - Kamal Adwan Hospital siege
  - Nasser Hospital siege
- Gaza humanitarian crisis (2023–present)
- Killing of health workers in the Gaza war
- Alleged military use of al-Shifa hospital
