= Hussam al-Masri =

Palestinian cameraman and contract photojournalist

- Died: August 25, 2025 (aged 48–49); Nasser Medical Complex, Khan Younis, Gaza Strip, Palestine
- Cause of death: 2025 Nasser Hospital strikes
- Occupation: Cameraman
- Employer: Reuters
- Known for: Reporting during the Israel-Gaza conflict; killed while streaming live

Hussam al-Masri (died 25 August 2025) was a Palestinian cameraman and contract photojournalist for Reuters, known for his coverage of the humanitarian crisis in Gaza. He was killed during an Israeli airstrike on Nasser Hospital in Khan Younis, southern Gaza, while operating a live video feed.

== Early life and career ==
Hussam al-Masri was born in Khan Younis in the southern Gaza Strip, earning a diploma in journalism.

He worked for many years in Gaza, first as a freelancer and later as a Reuters contractor, covering difficult conditions including malnutrition, civilian suffering, and effects of war.

== Personal life ==
Hussam was married, with four children. His wife, Samaher, was battling cancer at the time of his death.

== Death ==
On 25 August 2025, Hussam al-Masri was killed in an Israeli strike on Nasser Hospital in Khan Younis. Several key facts are recorded:

He was operating a live video feed for Reuters from Nasser Hospital, which abruptly shut down at the moment of the initial strike.

The strike was part of a double attack: after the initial strike, a second explosion hit the same location, killing others, including rescue workers, medics, and other journalists.

Among the other journalists killed were Mariam Abu Dagga, Mohammed Salama, Moaz Abu Taha, and Ahmed Abu Aziz. Photographer Hatem Khaled (also a Reuters contractor) was injured.

== See also ==
- 2025 Nasser Hospital strikes
- List of journalists killed in the Gaza war
