= Christos Christou =

Christos Christou may refer to:

- Christos Christou (physician), Greek physician
- Christos Christou (politician) (born 1980), Greek Cypriot politician
