= Dead checking =

Military check that an enemy is dead

Dead checking is U.S. military jargon for the practice of verifying the death of Iraqi insurgents and the subsequent killing of those who remain alive. It is reported to have been taught as procedure in clearing insurgent-held buildings as part of Operation Iraqi Freedom.

The term was in use as early as November 2004 when reporter Evan Wright of The Village Voice quoted an unnamed enlisted U.S. Marine and Iraq war veteran as saying:

They teach us to do dead-checking when we're clearing rooms. You put two bullets into the guy's chest and one in the brain. But when you enter a room where guys are wounded you might not know if they're alive or dead. So they teach us to dead-check them by pressing them in the eye with your boot, because generally a person, even if he's faking being dead, will flinch if you poke him there. If he moves, you put a bullet in the brain. You do this to keep the momentum going when you're flowing through a building. You don't want a guy popping up behind you and shooting you.

The term was used again by the Associated Press in July 2007, when Corporal Saul H. Lopezromo, a defense witness in the murder trial of Corporal Trent D. Thomas, testified that dead checking was routine and stated, "If somebody is worth shooting once, they're worth shooting twice."

The Los Angeles Times in July 2007 reported that Corporal Lopezromo testified, "Marines are taught dead-checking in boot camp, the School of Infantry at Camp Pendleton, and the pre-deployment training at Twentynine Palms called Mojave Viper."

== See also ==
- Double-tap strike
