= Nasser Hospital siege =

2024 hospital siege in Gaza Strip, Palestine

- Part of the siege of Khan Yunis during the Gaza war
Date	21 January – 28 February 2024 (1 month and 1 week); 24 March 2024 – 7 April 2024 (2 weeks)
Location	Nasser Hospital, Khan Yunis 31°20′52″N 34°17′36″E
Result	Nasser Hospital shuts down, later becomes operational again

Belligerents
Israel	Hamas (alleged) (Note: According to Al Jazeera, the "Israeli military has shown no concrete proof" that Hamas were present at Nasser Hospital.)

Units involved
Israel Defense Forces; Israeli Ground Forces; 98th Paratroopers Division; Oz Brigade; Maglan Unit; Egoz Unit; Israeli Navy; Shayetet 13; Israeli Intelligence Community; Shin Bet	(Hamas) Al-Qassam Brigades (allegedly)

Casualties and losses
None	16 killed, ~200 surrendered (per Israel)
- up to 21 civilians killed

During the Gaza war, the Nasser Hospital faced multiple attacks, including a siege and raid in January and February 2024. The hospital siege by Israeli forces created severe shortages of food, anesthesia, and painkillers. Reports emerged of Israeli snipers targeting individuals outside the hospital. Despite international calls for restraint, the Israel Defense Forces (IDF) ordered the evacuation of displaced people inside the hospital on 13 February 2024. On 15 February, Israeli soldiers raided the hospital. The hospital had completely ceased functioning by March 2024. However, in 2025, the hospital resumed medical services.

== Background ==
The Nasser Hospital was attacked multiple times during the Israel-Hamas War prior to the start of the siege. An Israeli shooting at the maternity ward of the hospital on 17 December 2023 killed a girl and wounded three others. The girl was a 13-year-old amputee, Donia Abu Mohsen, who had survived a previous Israeli airstrike that had killed her entire family. In late-December 2023, Richard Peeperkorn, a World Health Organization representative, stated 4,000 displaced internally displaced people were at risk as the Israeli military pursued operations at the hospital. NBC News had been following a doctor in the hospital since December 2023 and documenting his work with the patients. By the end of January 2024, there were only five physicians left in the hospital, with the others having fled or been killed. A doctor at the hospital told reporters that the hospital was filled with patients and the staff were overworked, stating "We cannot make rounds on patients. We cannot move between beds."

According to the IDF's chief spokesperson Rear Admiral Daniel Hagari, the determination to raid the facility was based on interrogations of militants who had been arrested or surrendered in the area, and freed hostages. The information reportedly led the IDF to believe that Israeli hostages had been previously held in the facility. During a CNN interview in mid-January, a released hostage, Sharon Aloni Cunio, had raised allegations that she, her children and dozens of other hostages were held in the hospital. However, CNN had been unable to independently verify this and Hamas quickly issued a denial. Also former hostage Ilana Gritzewsky testified before the United Nations Security Council that she and other hostages were kept captive inside Nasser Hospital.

On 14 February, the IDF stated that Nasser was being used to hold Israeli hostages.

== Siege ==
In early 2024, as Israeli forces advanced deeper south, bombardment of the areas around the Nasser Hospital intensified. This sparked worries that the hospital may be forced to shut down. A doctor at Nasser stated that the hospital was surrounded by Israeli tanks, bulldozers, quadcopters, and snipers. On 26 January 2024, the Health Ministry stated Nasser hospital was out of food, anesthetics, and painkillers due to an Israeli siege, stating, "There are 150 health personnel, 350 patients, and hundreds of displaced families in the Nasser Medical Complex in catastrophic conditions of starvation, targeting, and lack of treatment". On 27 January, Al Jazeera journalist Hani Mahmoud stated people at Nasser were experiencing "exactly what happened ... when the largest facilities like al-Shifa Hospital and the Indonesian Hospital came under attack." Since late January 2024 the hospital had been unable to send patients to other hospitals due to lack of resources, causing some doctors in the hospital to use WhatsApp to ask specialists for information.

A 40-year-old woman was killed by an Israeli sniper outside the hospital on 7 February. On 8 February, a doctor was shot and wounded while working in the operating room. A drone strike killed one person and wounded several others the same day. Paramedics were unable to leave the hospital due to Israeli snipers. On 9 February, Israeli snipers outside the hospital were shooting at "every moving object". 21 people were killed while trying to reach the hospital. An incident recorded and circulated online showed a doctor risking her life to save a young man wounded by Israeli snipers at the hospital gate. Doctors Without Borders stated on 10 February that Israeli forces were firing at people inside the hospital. Israeli tank and artillery fire hit the upper floor of the hospital. A man was killed by an Israeli sniper on 11 February on hospital grounds. Seven people in the hospital were killed by Israeli snipers on 12 February.

Israeli forces besieged the hospital again on 24 March 2024. The Palestinian Red Crescent reported "very intense shelling". A witness reported a carpet bombing, stating the land around the hospital was "shaking as if it were an earthquake". On 26 March, the Gaza Health Ministry reported "violent raids" near the hospital "in preparation for its storming". Several people were killed or wounded as the IDF raided the hospital on 27 March, while some medical staff and civilians seeking shelter in the hospital were arrested. The IDF withdrew from the hospital on 7 April.

== Evacuation ==
On 13 February, the IDF ordered displaced people inside the complex to evacuate the hospital. The same day, snipers killed three people at the hospital, with the Gaza Health Ministry stating "The displaced people are being shot while they are leaving, and people are being killed or injured". A pharmacist who worked in the hospital spoke of the evacuation to BBC Arabic and claimed that as soon as she had left the hospital and reached a checkpoint, the entire facility was swarmed by military dogs and many people were arrested at the checkpoint. According to a surgeon in the facility at least eight people who were attempting to evacuate that day came under gunfire, and among those injured was a 16-year-old boy who was shot at least four times at the hospitals gate.

Because the hospital had run out of fuel for its generator, sewage flooded parts of the hospital. UNOCHA reported bodies of killed people had been laying outside the hospital for several days because of the danger of Israeli snipers; Israeli soldiers continued to fire on the facility on 14 February. A civilian claimed that many of those who had attempted to leave on 14 February were shot at and forced to return to the hospital, stating the IDF had promised safe passage but when he attempted to leave he was approached and held by IDF troops in a bulldozer and tank for four hours. The Health Ministry reported there were 273 patients unable to move and 327 companions remaining in the hospital. A doctor at the facility told colleagues in the United Kingdom that all those in the hospital were living with fear and anxiety while trying to evacuate those sheltering in the hospital. He stated many civilians had been shot by Israeli snipers, with the majority being inside the hospitals grounds.

According to The Intercept, Israeli soldiers forced a young Palestinian man, handcuffed by zip-ties, to warn the displaced people to evacuate the hospital, and then shot and killed the young man after he had delivered the message. Meanwhile, the IDF set up facial recognition cameras to scan individuals who evacuated the hospital. The IDF destroyed the hospital's northern exit gate and blocked it with sand and debris. Doctors Without Borders stated the evacuation gave displaced people the choice between staying to "become a potential target" or fleeing "into an apocalyptic landscape". The IDF gave people until 7am on 15 February to evacuate the hospital, while firing inside the hospital with snipers and tank fire. An IDF spokesman stated that there was no obligation to evacuate and the IDF was "in communication" with hospital staff.

== Raid ==
Israeli soldiers entered Nasser Hospital on 15 February 2024. The soldiers entered from the south; according to a spokesman for the Gaza Health Ministry they destroyed tents and bulldozed a mass grave. Israel stated it examined some 400 corpses looking for Israeli hostages. (Note: On 7 March, Israeli returned the corpses of 47 people whose bodies had been removed from the grave.) A survivor of the raid stated, "They destroyed the walls surrounding us as well as the doctor’s room. They ordered us to leave and fired at us, fired bombs and rockets on our heads from the top". Verified footage from the raid showed Israeli tanks entering the hospital grounds. Israeli forces raided the maternity ward and destroyed two ambulances; one Doctors Without Borders staff member went missing, and Al Jazeera reported civilians were attacked both inside the hospital and outside as they tried to flee. After passing an Israeli checkpoint, displaced people and patients evacuating the hospital were shot and wounded by an Israeli quadcopter. Mass arrests were reported, and attack drones were reportedly used to follow and shoot at children. According to Al Jazeera English, witnesses reported that "the Israeli military rounded up people from inside the facility, blindfolded them with their hands tied behind their backs, and killed them either by the use of quadcopters or sniper fire."

IDF soldiers reportedly forced all male patients who were able to move and any companions to evacuate to the maternity building, which was converted to an IDF military barracks. The Gaza Health Ministry stated that 95 medics, 191 patients, and 165 displaced people were being held in a single building.

Doctors Without Borders called for an immediate end to the raid, stating the military had created "a chaotic situation, with an undetermined number of people killed and injured". Following the raid, the IDF stated there was no evidence hostages had been held at Nasser. (Note: Describing the situation, Al Jazeera stated, "This is just the latest of the series of the Israeli claims that have not had evidence to back them up with.") Later on, the IDF Spokesperson's Unit stated that it found weapons, including grenades, boxes of medications bearing the names of Israeli hostages, vehicles used by Hamas members who participated in the October 7 attacks and Israeli-owned cars stolen during the massacre. Along with the accusations of weapons found by the IDF, a low-resolution photograph of the alleged weapons was released, however news agencies such as CNN were unable to independently verify when and where the photo was taken. According to the IDF, alleged "Hamas members" who were reportedly posing as medical staff were arrested. On 20 February, the IDF stated its operation was "nearing completion".

On 22 February, after first withdrawing but continuing to guard the hospital grounds, soldiers reportedly entered the hospital again. The Gaza Health Ministry reported that dozens of medical personnel remained under arrest. Eyewitnesses on 23 February stated that Israeli forces continued to surround the hospital, repeatedly shelling it. The IDF declared that its operations had ended on 25 February and partially withdrew from the hospital. The following day, however, reports continued of Israeli snipers "shooting at anything moving" in the vicinity of the hospital. On 28 February, one of the hospital buildings caught on fire after being hit by an Israeli artillery shell.

UNICEF stated on 19 March that the hospital was no longer functioning, with no one inside the building.

However, in 2025 the hospital has resumed medical services.

== Humanitarian impact ==
=== Impact on patients ===
Five critically wounded patients died due to a lack of oxygen resulting from Israel's siege of the hospital. Following the raid, medical personnel, patients, and displaced people were detained in the hospital's maternity ward, where they underwent "interrogation in harsh and inhumane conditions". A World Health Organization (WHO) convoy was prevented from reaching the hospital with basic supplies, including food and water, on 16 February. WHO stated, "We are trying to get access because people who are still in Nasser Medical Complex need assistance." The director of the hospital stated, "We were forced to transfer all the patients and the wounded to the hospital's old building ... Electric power was cut off from the entire medical complex ... We stand helpless, unable to provide any form of medical assistance to the patients inside the hospital".

On 16 February the Gaza Health Ministry stated that the entire hospital was without electricity, water, food and heating. The ministry also stated that a "large number" of the hospital's staff had been arrested. The IDF stated they had arrested 100 people. On 18 February, the World Health Organization assisted with evacuating 14 patients, with two that needed continuous manual ventilation, after being denied entry into the hospital for two days. The same day, the hospital was reported to be "completely out of service", while Israel denied this, claiming that the hospital had received humanitarian aid including a generator, food, water and fuel. The health ministry stated 25 hospital staff and 136 patients had no access to electricity, water, food, or oxygen. 18 additional patients were evacuated on 19 February.

On 20 February, Doctors Without Borders reported they had lost contact with their medical team at Nasser and called for the hospital's remaining 130 patients to be evacuated. WHO evacuated an additional 32 patients in critical condition. Citing the Gaza Health Ministry, UNOCHA reported that 70 medical personnel had been arrested. On 21 February, doctors at Nasser described the situation there as "unbearable", lacking oxygen, water, or medical supplies, as raw sewage flooded the radiology department. 21 additional patients were evacuated by the Palestinian Red Crescent. On 22 February, medics at the hospital stated they had buried a total of thirteen patients who had died due to a lack of oxygen. The Palestinian Red Crescent evacuated an additional 18 patients on 23 February. On 27 February, two days after the IDF declared an end to the hospital siege, the Gaza Health Ministry stated the hospital was completely out of service, with ventilators shut down, water cut off, and sewage overflowing.

The IDF rebuffed allegations that they intentionally damaged the hospital's operating systems, instead claiming that the power outage was caused by a generator malfunction, and all vital systems had remained functional due to a backup power source. The IDF also stated that it had provided the hospital an alternative generator, food for infants, water and diesel fuel after the attack. The IDF's claims were contradicted by World Health Organization secretary-general Tedros Adhanom Ghebreyesus who stated, "The hospital is still experiencing an acute shortage of food, basic medical supplies, and oxygen. There is no tap water and no electricity".

=== Allegations of mistreatment of medical personnel ===
Colleagues of those working in the hospital issued a statement through Healthcare Workers Watch - Palestine, Gaza Medic Voices, and Health Workers 4 Palestine highlighting their concern that the IDF had kidnapped one of the surgeons who had been posting about the siege and raid, after he had been out of communication for days.

CNN reported that doctors were forced to strip down to their underwear and cited an eyewitnesses stating, "If you don't bring food and water, we will die". On 12 March 2024, the BBC released a report in which medical staff at the hospital claimed to have been "humiliated, beaten, doused with cold water, and forced to kneel in uncomfortable positions for hours" by the IDF. The report also contained footage of Israeli troops detaining several men who had been forced to strip to their underwear out of medical robes and kneel outside the hospital.

=== Mass graves ===
In late April 2024, following the withdrawal of Israeli forces earlier in the month, Gazan civil defence workers exhumed nearly 300 bodies from the mass grave in the compound. Al Jazeera English reported, "The bodies include elderly women, children and young men". A spokesperson for the United Nations High Commissioner for Human Rights stated, "Some of them had their hands tied, which of course indicates serious violations of international human rights law and international humanitarian law".

In regards to the April 2024 reports of mass graves, the IDF stated that any "claim that the IDF buried Palestinian bodies is baseless and unfounded." The IDF told CNN that during its operation "in the area of Nasser Hospital, in accordance to the effort to locate hostages and missing persons, corpses buried by Palestinians in the area of Nasser Hospital were examined." They further stated that "Bodies examined, which did not belong to Israeli hostages, were returned to their place."

== Investigation ==
In the days after the siege, BBC News independently verified footage of at least 21 incidents of gunfire or impact of gunfire that was filmed within the hospital's grounds, and had confirmed the shooting of three separate people in the grounds. When questioned by reporters, the IDF claimed that there had been active fights in the area before entering the compound, and that precise shots were fired at identified "terrorists" in the area.

== Reactions ==
Prior to the IDF's raid, the World Health Organization (WHO) stated, "We cannot lose that hospital ... this hospital is critically important". Following the raid, the Gaza Media Office called it a "blatant war crime" and stated, "We hold the Israeli occupation and the international community and the United States fully responsible". Christopher Lockyear, the secretary-general of Doctors Without Borders, stated the situation at Nasser was "chaotic, catastrophic". On 16 February, WHO stated, "Reports of forcing the transfer of many patients into a different building are gravely concerning".

James Smith, a British doctor who previously worked in Gaza, stated, "It's complete neglect of the rules that guide conduct during armed conflict. We're hearing reports of patients being killed in their hospital beds, artillery fired directly into the hospital, patients killed because electricity was cut." Canadian doctor Tarek Loubani stated, "The patients, the doctors, the staff, and the refugees inside ... are in deep danger of being arrested, tortured and killed." A doctor who evacuated the hospital stated, "I ask the leaders of this world ... Seeing this real genocide happening in front of your eyes and nothing – just silence?"

On 21 February, a senior UNOCHA official stated, "There are dead bodies in the corridors. Patients are in a desperate situation. This has become a place of death, not a place of healing. This is a preventable tragedy that should not have happened".

== See also ==
- 2025 Nasser Hospital strikes
- Al-Shifa Hospital siege
- Attacks on health facilities during the Gaza war
- First Geneva Convention – "the Amelioration of the Condition of the Wounded in Armies in the Field"
- Kamal Adwan Hospital siege
- Killing of health workers in the Gaza war
- Timeline of the Gaza Strip healthcare collapse
