= Mariam Dagga =

Palestinian journalist (1992–2025)

Mariam Abu Dagga
- مريم أبو دقة
- Born: Mariam Abu Dagga; Khan Yunis, Gaza Strip, Palestine
- Died: 25 August 2025 (aged 33); Nasser Hospital, Gaza Strip, Palestine
- Cause of death: 2025 Nasser Hospital strikes
- Occupations: Journalist; photographer
- Employer(s): Associated Press and Independent Arabia
- Known for: Reporting on malnourished children during the Gaza Strip famine; killed while working
- Children: 1
- Awards: Associated Press internal award
- Website: Mariam Dagga on Instagram

Mariam Abu Dagga (Arabic: مريم أبو دقة; born 1992 – 25 August 2025) was a Palestinian visual journalist who worked for multiple agencies including the Associated Press and Independent Arabia. Dagga was one of the few female war correspondents working in Gaza when she was killed by Israeli forces on 25 August 2025, at the Nasser Hospital in Khan Yunis, southern Gaza.

Prior to her death, Dagga produced "harrowing" images of the Gaza war, and won an Associated Press award for her photojournalism.

== Early life ==
Dagga was born in Khan Younis. She studied journalism at the Al-Aqsa University and after graduation, began her work as a journalist in 2015.

== Career ==
=== Journalism ===
Dagga first achieved prominence as a journalist when she filmed the killing of a protester by Israeli forces during the 2018–2019 Great March of Return in Gaza. Over 200 residents of Gaza were killed by Israeli forces and over 9,000 wounded during the protests; Dagga later realized that the man whom she filmed being shot was her own brother.

=== Gaza war ===
Dagga was known for documenting the experiences of displaced Palestinians, and of doctors who treated wounded or malnourished children, with "rare honesty and courage." Independent Arabia described Dagga as an "example of dedication and professional commitment," bringing "her camera into the heart of the field." Associated Press Executive Director and Senior Vice President Julian Pace said that Dagga's difficult journalistic work in Gaza was remarkable, particularly for her "coverage of the war’s impact on children."

Dagga won an internal award at the Associated Press for her coverage of malnourished children in Gaza.

Speaking to the BBC, Palestinian journalist Hadar al-Qurd described Dagga as one of the most active female journalists in southern Gaza. Al-Qurd said that other journalists relied on Dagga for the news and information that she gathered in her work. Al-Qurd noted that Dagga was especially brave, always carrying her camera, and often going to the sites of airstrikes directly; she also noted that Dagga was a champion of the rights of female journalists in Gaza. Other colleagues also noted Dagga's bravery as a war correspondent. Al Jazeera journalist Youmna El Sayed noted that Dagga had visibly lost a significant amount of weight during the war.

Due to Israeli killing of journalists in the Gaza war, Dagga wrote her will during the conflict.

== Personal life and death ==
Dagga had a 12-year-old son at the time of her death. He was evacuated from Gaza to Egypt and then to the United Arab Emirates earlier in the conflict. Before the war, Dagga had donated her kidney to her father to save his life.

Dagga faced personal tragedy during the Gaza war, losing her mother, and her colleague Anas Al-Sharif, who was assassinated in 2025.

=== Death ===
Youtube video from New York Post
- A video from Al-Ghad shows the second moments after the killing of Dagga and other journalists and emergency workers by the Israeli strike. on YouTube

Dagga was killed on 25 August, 2025, when Israeli military forces bombed the Nasser Hospital in Khan Yunis, Gaza Strip, killing 22 civilians, among them Dagga and 4 other journalists. Israeli forces conducted two sequential strikes on the hospital, the second killing many journalists and emergency response workers. After the first bombing of the hospital, Dagga and other journalists had rushed into the hospital to check on the wellbeing of their colleague, Reuters journalist Hussam al-Masri, who was killed by the strike. Nasser hospital was the only functional hospital in southern Gaza at the time of the bombings.

Nonprofit organizations and media organizations that paid tribute to Dagga included Al Jazeera Media Network. On 29 August, Palestinian and Israeli activists and journalists gathered in Nazareth, to protest the killing of Palestinian journalists, including her. They wore “Press” insignia stickers and held banners with messages readed “Don’t assassinate the truth,” using her death as a rallying cry for peace and press freedom. Algerian Ambassador to the United Nations memorialized Dagga's portrait in a meeting of the United Nations Security Council after her killing.

She was 33 years old at the time of her death.

== Legacy and memorials ==
In 2025, Maryam Abu Daqqa was posthumously honored with the International Press Freedom Hero Award in recognition of her courageous reporting on the Gaza War and her unwavering commitment to press freedom.

== See also ==
- List of journalists killed during the Israeli–Palestinian conflict
- List of journalists killed in the Gaza war
- Hussam al-Masri
- Anas Al-Sharif
