= Youmna El Sayed =

Palestinian journalist (born 1990)

- يمنى السيد
- Citizenship: Palestine
- Occupation: Journalist
- Employer: Al Jazeera English
- Known for: reporting on the Gaza Strip
- Children: 4

Youmna El Sayed (Arabic: يمنى السيد; born c. 1990) is a Palestinian journalist. Known for her work reporting on Palestine, she was Al Jazeera English's correspondent in the Gaza Strip until she was forced to leave the country in January 2024 following the outbreak of the Gaza War.

== Career ==
Based in Gaza City, El Sayed worked for various English language media outlets including TRT World, RT, CNA and the Associated Press, before becoming Al Jazeera English's Gaza Strip correspondent. She primarily reported from war zones, specialising in stories about war and displacement, and presenting human narratives about people living in conflict zones. In recognition of her journalism, El Sayed received several awards, including the Pimental Fonseca Civil Journalism Award, the World Freedom Hero Award, the Maria Grazia Cutuli International Journalism Award, the Award for Courage in Journalism and the Token of Human Rights from the United Nations. In 2025, she was nominated for Index on Censorship's Freedom of Expression Award.

El Sayed reported on the early stages of the Gaza war from its outbreak in October 2023. After initially evacuating to Wadi Gaza, El Sayed, her husband and their four children returned to Gaza City due to a lack of water and electricity in southern Gaza. On 30 October, El Sayed's husband received a phone call from the Israel Defence Forces telling them to leave their home immediately ahead of an imminent bombardment. Al Jazeera criticised the IDF for making what it considered to be a "threat" against El Sayed, several days after the deaths of the family El Sayed's colleague Wael al-Dahdouh, in similar circumstances. The threats against El Sayed and al-Dahdouh prompted the United Nations to release a statement calling the presence of journalists in Gaza a "mark of courage". El Sayed and her family evacuated on foot to Khan Yunis and later Rafah, before her father was able to pay for them to be transported to Egypt, where they sought asylum. Between October 2023 and January 2024, El Sayed kept a diary of her experiences, which were later published in Prospect and The Nation.

As of January 2024, El Sayed and her family live in Cairo. She is prohibited from working due to Al Jazeera being banned in Egypt since 2011. Since leaving Gaza, El Sayed has criticised international journalists of not doing enough to seek entry to enter Gaza to report on the war, stating they had let go of their principles of freedom of speech and using the excuse of a "lack of information" and "not enough Western journalists entering the Gaza Strip" to not report on what was happening there. International journalists are prohibited from entering Gaza unless they are supervised by the Israeli Defence Force.

El Sayed has also criticised the dehumanisation of Palestinians by international journalists, including describing Hind Rajab, a six-year-old girl killed in Gaza City by an Israeli tank, as a "young woman".

El Sayed has also accused the IDF of deliberately targeting Palestinian journalists, including her colleagues Anas al-Sharif, Mohamed Qreiqeh and Mariam Dagga.
