= Moaz Abu Taha =

Palestinian freelance video journalist

- Died: August 25, 2025 (aged 26–27); Nasser Medical Complex, Khan Younis, Gaza Strip, Palestine
- Cause of death: 2025 Nasser Hospital strikes
- Occupation: Freelance journalist
- Employer: Reuters
- Known for: Reporting during the Israel-Gaza conflict; killed while working

Moaz Abu Taha (died 25 August 2025) was a Palestinian freelance video journalist, known for his coverage of the humanitarian crisis in Gaza. He was killed during an Israeli airstrike on Nasser Hospital in Khan Younis, southern Gaza, as he was documenting the aftermath of an earlier strike.

== Early life and career ==
Abu Taha worked as a freelance video journalist, contributing to multiple Palestinian and international outlets.

Occasionally, his work was published by Reuters. His work often focused on humanitarian reporting, documenting suffering, malnutrition, wounded civilians and urgent stories from hospitals.

He was known among colleagues and family for being social, kind, and committed to his work. He reportedly used whatever tools he had (sometimes a phone camera) to document events, especially as conditions in Gaza worsened.

== Death ==
On 25 August 2025, Abu Taha was killed in the second strike at Nasser Hospital in Khan Younis. The hospital had already been hit; Abu Taha was filming the aftermath (rescue workers, journalists) from an external stairwell when the second attack struck.

According to witnesses and his brother, he answered a call amid the strikes saying he was fine but that Hussam Al-Masri had been killed. He asked for a little time to film. Shortly after, the stairwell where he stood was struck. He was later found dead; his body was badly damaged.
