= Ahmed Abu Aziz =

Palestinian journalist

- Died: August 25, 2025 (aged 27–28); Nasser Medical Complex, Khan Younis, Gaza Strip, Palestine
- Cause of death: 2025 Nasser Hospital strikes
- Occupation: Freelance journalist
- Employer(s): Middle East Eye, Quds News Network
- Known for: Reporting during the Israel-Gaza conflict; killed while working
- Spouse: Lurzan Abu Aziz (married 2024)

Ahmed Abu Aziz (died 25 August 2025) was a Palestinian freelance journalist, correspondent for several media outlets, who was killed in an Israeli airstrike on Nasser Hospital in Khan Younis, southern Gaza. He had contributed to Middle East Eye, Quds News Network, and other organisations.

== Biography ==
Abu Aziz was married in 2024 to his wife, Lurzan Abu Aziz and was studying a Ph.D. in media.

Colleagues described him as "the journalist who never stopped," known for travelling across Gaza to get stories, aware of the risk but committed nonetheless.

== Death ==
On 25 August 2025, Abu Aziz was killed in a double strike by Israeli forces on Nasser Hospital in Khan Younis, southern Gaza.

The first strike hit a live video feed location; the second strike followed minutes later, as journalists, medics, rescue personnel rushed to the scene. Ahmed was reportedly killed during this second strike. His body was found by his wife.

== Legacy and reactions ==
His death, along with that of four other journalists, raised widespread condemnation from press freedom organisations and human rights groups.

His work has been cited as part of the journalism community's efforts to document civilian suffering and conflict conditions in Gaza.
