= Mohammed Salama =

Palestinian photojournalist

- محمد سلامة
- Born: 2001
- Died: August 25, 2025 (aged 23–24); Nasser Medical Complex, Khan Younis, Gaza Strip, Palestine
- Cause of death: 2025 Nasser Hospital strikes
- Occupation: Photojournalist
- Employer(s): Al Jazeera and Middle East Eye
- Known for: Reporting during the Israel-Gaza conflict; killed while working

Mohammed Salama (Arabic: محمد سلامة; 2001 – 25 August 2025) was a Palestinian photojournalist and war correspondent known for his reporting during the Gaza–Israel conflict. He worked with media outlets such as Middle East Eye (MEE) and Al Jazeera, documenting events from the ground including hospital sieges, civilian suffering, and destruction.

== Early life and career ==
He began reporting soon after the escalation of conflict in Gaza, using whatever tools he had — including an iPhone and gimbal.

Over time, he built a reputation for detailed, intimate photojournalism, and for being among the first to bring raw visuals of civilian suffering to social media platforms like TikTok.

== Notable works ==
Salama contributed approximately 200 reports for MEE. He covered key incidents during the war, including the siege of Nasser Hospital, and documented the humanitarian crisis.

He balanced the demands of frontline journalism with personal risk, often filming in dangerous zones, caring for wounded civilians, and striving to keep up coverage despite his own health or safety concerns.

== Death ==
Mohammed Salama was killed in an Israeli double-tap strike on the Nasser Medical Complex in Khan Younis, southern Gaza, on 25 August 2025. The strike also claimed the lives of several other journalists and medical personnel.

At the time, he was engaged to fellow journalist Hala Asfour. Their relationship, and his personal life, have been noted in tributes after his death.

== Legacy and impact ==
His work has spotlighted not only the violence and destruction of war but also the human stories, families, children, and civilians caught in conflict, and called attention to the need for accountability.

His death has been widely mourned in journalistic and humanitarian circles, and has brought renewed attention to the risks faced by media workers in conflict zones.
