= Christos Christou (physician) =

International President of Médecins Sans Frontières

- Born: Trikala, Greece
- Education: Aristotle University (M.D.); University of Athens (Master's); National and Kapodistrian University (PhD)
- Known for: Outgoing International President of MSF

Christos Christou is a Greek physician who is the former international president of Médecins Sans Frontières/Doctors Without Borders (MSF).

Christou is from Greece where he studied medicine before working as a doctor in the United Kingdom. He joined MSF and worked as a surgeon in Cameroon, Iraq, and South Sudan before becoming elected as the Vice President, then President of MSF Greece and later succeeding Joanne Liu as the International President of MSF international.

== Early life ==
Christou was born in Trikala, Greece.

== Education ==
Christou has a degree in medicine from Aristotle University, a Ph.D in surgery from the National and Kapodistrian University, and a Master's degree in International Health and Health Crisis Management from the University of Athens.

== Career ==
As an emergency surgery specialist, Christou worked at North Middlesex University Hospital and King’s College Hospital in London, UK.

He joined MSF in 2002 as a volunteer surgeon, working on refugee health issues, and HIV in Cameroon, Iraq, South Sudan and Zambia.

He worked as the General Secretary, and then as the vice president before being elected as the president of MSF Greece in 2005.

Christou was elected to be the international president of MSF in June 2019. Later in 2019, he wrote an open letter to European Union leaders advocating that they cease their policy of stopping the journey of asylum seekers in the Greek islands.

In 2020, responding to an open letter from MSF staff about institutional racism, he welcomed the critique, but also questioned how widespread racism was within MSF. He also criticized governments for failing to put in place efficient healthcare plans at the beginning of the coronavirus pandemic, especially in low income countries.

In 2021, Christou spoke about the importance of addressing climate change, criticized pharmaceutical companies for not sharing COVID-19 vaccine intellectual property, and spoke of increasing humanitarian needs in Afghanistan.

In 2021, he was critical of Brazilian President Jair Bolsonaro's management of the COVID-19 pandemic.
