= Nasser Hospital =

Hospital in Khan Yunis, Gaza Strip, Palestine

Nasser Medical Complex
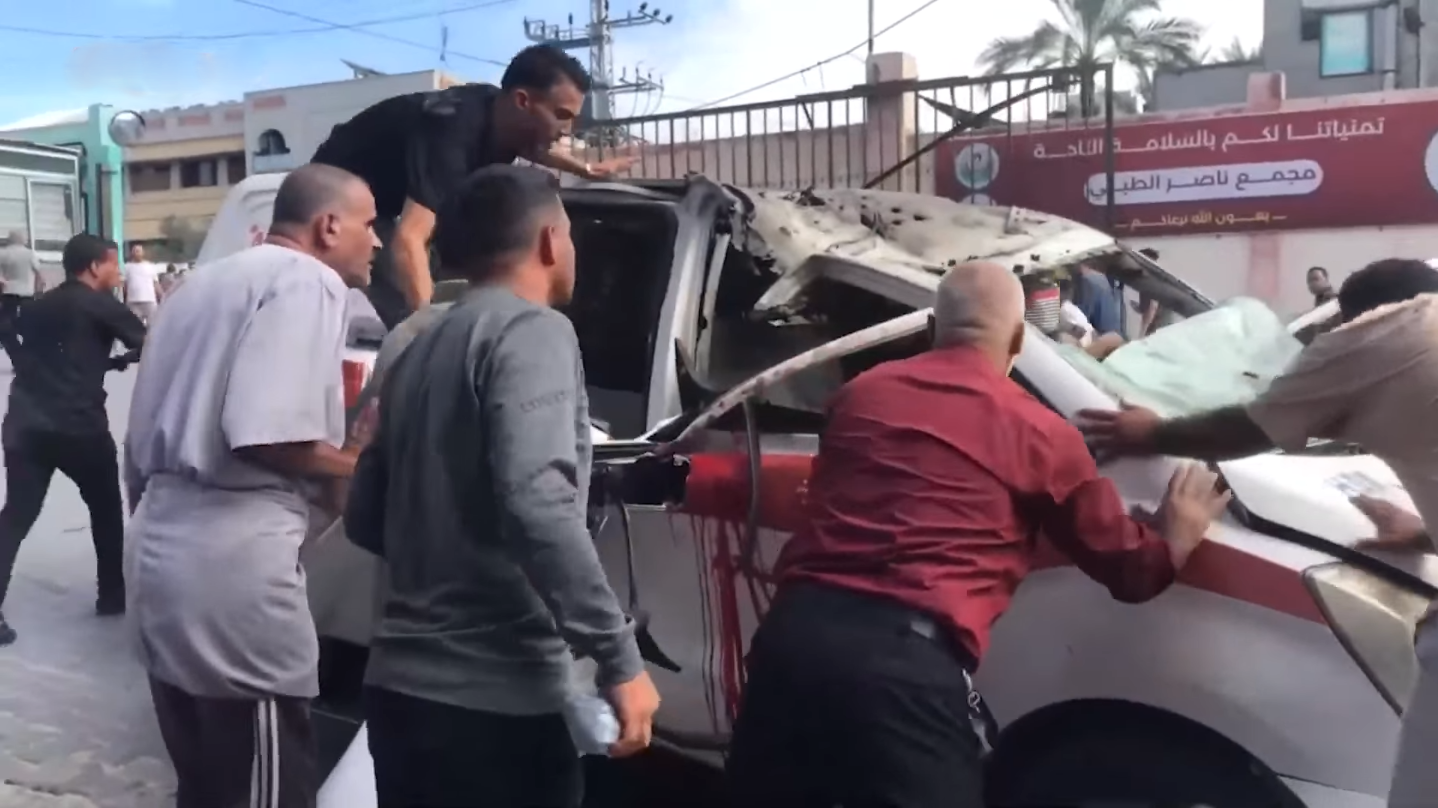
- Ambulance in front of Nasser Hospital after an Israeli airstrike (October 2023)

Geography
- Location: Khan Yunis, Gaza Strip, Palestine
- Coordinates: 31.3471°N 34.2930°E

History
- Opened: 1960

The Nasser Hospital (Note: Note: "Nasser" (Arabic: ناصر) and "Nasr" (Arabic: نصر) are close, but different words, sometimes confused in press in the names of hospitals, e.g., here.) (or Nasser Medical Complex) is one of the largest hospitals in the Gaza Strip, Palestine.

During the Gaza war, Nasser was one of the final active hospitals in Khan Yunis in the southern Gaza Strip, and was one of the last functioning hospitals in all of Gaza.

== History ==
Patient in Nasser Hospital ICU in 2005

In 1957, during the Egyptian occupation of the Gaza Strip, the Egyptian authorities built Nasser Hospital on the site of a quarantine and febrile disease hospital established by the British Mandate government in the 1940s. The hospital opened its doors in 1960 and was named after former Egyptian President Gamal Abdel Nasser.

In 1972, the hospital closed for construction to double its capacity from 112 beds. It reopened in February 1974. In December 1984, the Israeli authorities closed down the orthopedic department due to contamination and transferred its activities to Al-Shifa Hospital.

== Gaza war ==
The hospital was shelled multiple times throughout the war. The international media reported on the death of a 13-year-old amputee, Donia Abu Mohsen, who had survived a previous Israeli airstrike that killed her entire family. According to a freed Israeli hostage who had been held there, the hospital was used by Hamas to hide hostages kidnapped during its October 7 attack on Israel.

In early 2024, as Israeli forces advanced, bombing around the hospital intensified, sparking worries that the hospital would have to shut down. According to a report by The Guardian on 19 January 2024, fighting had come within metres of Nasser Hospital, which was described as the largest hospital still working in Gaza: "It has been receiving hundreds of wounded patients every day since the fighting shifted to the south last month. There are fears it could be forced to close because of Israeli bombardments and evacuation orders. The IDF said it had credible intelligence that Hamas militants were hiding in the hospital, some posing as medical staff, and that Israeli hostages or bodies of Israeli hostages were being held there. Israeli soldiers entered the hospital on 15 February 2024. Five patients died after Israeli forces cut power to the hospital during the raid. On 18 February, the World Health Organization said the hospital could no longer serve its patients, and that the hospital was no longer functional. Tedros Adhanom Ghebreyesus attributed the hospital's inability to continue operating to the Israeli siege and raid.

As of 23 February 2024, the hospital no longer had food or water and had no oxygen for patients. The Gaza Health Ministry attributed thirteen patient deaths to the lack of electricity and oxygen at the hospital. In July 2024, Javid Abdelmoneim, a doctor with Médecins Sans Frontières, reported conditions at the Nasser Hospital, stating, "I've worked in mass casualties around the world and the smell of blood is the same wherever you are. But here in Gaza, the horror really hits home." In an interview, Abdelmoneim stated that hospital staff were required to prioritize urgent surgeries. In July 2024, Doctors Without Borders again warned the Nasser Hospital was at risk as fighting approached.

=== Mass graves ===
In late April 2024, a mass grave containing nearly 300 bodies was discovered following the withdrawal of Israeli forces earlier in the month, according to Gazan civil defence workers. In regards to the April 2024 reports of mass graves, the IDF has stated that any “claim that the IDF buried Palestinian bodies is baseless and unfounded.” The IDF told CNN that during its operation “in the area of Nasser Hospital, in accordance to the effort to locate hostages and missing persons, corpses buried by Palestinians in the area of Nasser Hospital were examined.” They further stated that “Bodies examined, which did not belong to Israeli hostages, were returned to their place.

=== June 2025 ===
On 27 June 2025, Israel-backed Popular Forces militants reportedly seized control of the Nasser Hospital after a gunbattle with Hamas forces during the fourth battle of Khan Yunis. The Guardian reported witness testimony that armed gangs fought over aid in the hospital and left after gunmen affiliated with Hamas attempted to end the fighting.

=== 25 August 2025 strikes ===
On 25 August 2025, an Israel Defense Forces double tap strike hit the Nasser Hospital in Khan Yunis, Gaza Strip, killing 22 people, including 5 journalists. Among the journalists killed were the following: Hussam al-Masri, a Reuters cameraman; Mariam Dagga, a freelance journalist for Associated Press; Mohammed Salama, an Al Jazeera cameraman; Moaz Abu Taha, a freelance photographer who also was working with Reuters, and Ahmed Abu Aziz, a correspondent for Middle East Eye and Quds News Network.

=== February 2026 ===
In February 2026, Médecins Sans Frontières stated that its teams observed masked, armed individuals within the Nasser Hospital compound "carrying out arbitrary arrests of patients" and suspected the movement of weapons, leading the organization to suspend non-critical operations. MSF did not specify which organization the individuals belonged to. Ahmed Fouad Alkhatib of the Atlantic Council accused Hamas of operating a detention and interrogation center at the hospital, where opponents were allegedly tortured. The story was reported by the Foundation for Defense of Democracies (FDD), a Washington, D.C. think tank.

=== 11–12 November 2026 airstrike ===
After midnight on the night of 11–12 November 2026, an Israeli airstrike hit the hospital, injuring 52 people and killing 6, including Dr. Rizk Abu Shaaira and a 13-year-old child.

At 12:30 am on Thursday 12 November 2026, an Israeli airstrike hit the hospital. The attack occurred despite a ceasefire being in place. The hospital has been attacked many times since the start of the genocidal war on Gaza. The strike was the seventh attack on the hospital and the second on the surgical ward. The attack used two missiles, one of which failed to explode. There would have been even more extensive damage if it had detonated as planned. The Intercept reported that the missiles were manufactured in the United States.

The Israeli military claimed the hospital was being used as a "Hamas command centre". Israelis were also continuing to block the entry of medical supplies into the Gaza Strip.

The airstrike killed six people. Early reports said that 20 or more people had been injured. An updated report from Friday 13 November said that 52 people had been injured.

One of the people killed was general surgery specialist Dr Rezq Abu Shaeera. Dr Abu Shaeera had been offered an opportunity to evacuate, but declined the offer because he was unwilling to abandon his patients. He also appeared in the film American Doctor.

Another general surgery specialist, Dr Mohammed Qdeih, was wounded in the attack.

The airstrike also killed a 13-year-old child. A previous attack on the hospital, in 2024, killed 12-year-old Donia Abu Mohsen.

== See also ==
- List of hospitals in the State of Palestine
