= Quds News Network =

Palestinian media outlet

- Abbreviation: QNN
- Established: 2011; 15 years ago
- Official language: Arabic, English
- Website: qudsnen.co

Quds News Network (Arabic: شبكة قدس الإخبارية, romanized: Shabakat Quds al-Ikhbārīyah; QNN) is a Palestinian youth news agency founded in 2011. The agency is staffed with volunteer correspondents across Palestine. The network gained widespread following on social media around 2015 through its fast distribution video coverage of escalations in the Israeli–Palestinian conflict, which had made it as popular as Al Jazeera, appealing particularly to young Palestinians.

According to Mondoweiss, the Palestinian Authority blocked QNN's website in 2019 as part of a crackdown on dissent. Some of its pages were also blocked by some social media websites in 2019 and 2023. The QNN states that it is independent and funds itself through advertisements, and that it aims to expose the acts of the Israeli occupation. QNN was described as affiliated with Hamas during 2022–2023 by the Australian Jewish Association, Jewish News Syndicate, and The Guardian. Mondoweiss in 2019 and the Committee to Protect Journalists in 2025 retracted earlier statements in which they had stated that QNN was affiliated with Hamas.

== History ==
In 2015, the Christian Science Monitor reported that the network was run by 12 freelance correspondents and 60 volunteer field reporters, and that its fast distribution video coverage on social media of recent escalations in the Israeli–Palestinian conflict had made it as popular as Al Jazeera, appealing particularly to young Palestinians. QNN then boasted around 3.8 million followers on Facebook and 269,000 followers on Twitter covering the conflict.

The Associated Press reported the same year that Israelis allege that Palestinian social media is helping fuel a cycle of violence, while Palestinians have said that such sites only hold a mirror to Israeli violence and occupation and Palestinian frustration and that social media reflects reality and does not create it. It also reported that while QNN says it is independent, it has a reputation of being associated with Palestinian Islamic Jihad, a militant group. The site generates income from its advertisements and text message subscriptions, and its editors have stated that they do not receive funding from any political group and that they aim to expose the acts of the Israeli occupation.

According to Mondoweiss, QNN was among 59 websites blocked by the Palestinian Authority in 2019, a move which it described as part of an ongoing crackdown on opposition and of voices critical to President Mahmoud Abbas through online censorship. The move became widely known after Palestinians protested the blocks on social media and in the street.

Twitter subsequently suspended QNN's accounts in November 2019 as part of broader actions against accounts linked to militant groups such as Hamas and Hezbollah. In January 2021, TikTok banned QNN, stating that it was a move related to the account's content. Meta suspended QNN's English and Arabic pages after the October 7 attacks. The Jewish News Syndicate reported in 2023 that the Australian Jewish Association had criticized the site as "a notorious anti-Israel antisemitic propaganda platform affiliated with Hamas."

== Independence versus affiliations ==
QNN describes itself as "independent", that "correspondents are ... free from the conditions of the financier and parties", that it "does not follow any specific ideology".

Mondoweiss stated in an October 2019 news article that QNN is "an independent news source with no political affiliation" and that an earlier version of its article was incorrect in stating that QNN is associated with Hamas. The Committee to Protect Journalists referred to QNN as "Hamas-affiliated" in its original version of a May 2020 news article and in early 2025 revised the description to "privately owned", adding an editorial note describing the change as a correction.

In 2015, Associated Press described QNN as having a "reputation for being affiliated with" Palestinian Islamic Jihad. QNN was referred to as being affiliated with Hamas by the Australian Jewish Association in 2022, by Jewish News Syndicate in October 2023, and by The Guardian in a live blog in November 2023.

== Notable journalists ==
QNN journalist Yehya Al-Yaqoubi was awarded the Samir Kassir Award for Freedom of the Press by The Delegation of the European Union to Lebanon and the Samir Kassir Foundation. The award was given in the opinion piece category in honor of Al-Yaqoub's article on the Killing of Eyad al-Hallaq, titled "Autistic, killed by Israeli police on his way to school – Iyad Al-Hallak, the Palestinian George Floyd" and published by QNN on 1 March 2021.

QNN director Sari Mansour and freelance photographer Hassouneh Salim were killed by an Israeli airstrike on the Bureij refugee camp in central Gaza on 18 November 2023 during the Gaza war, in an incident which UNESCO deplored and called for the protection of media professionals and for an independent investigation to "determine the circumstances of this tragedy".

== See also ==
- History of Palestinian journalism
