= Gaza Daily =

BBC emergency radio service for Gaza

- Gaza Strip
- Frequency: 639 kHz mediumwave

Programming
- Language: Arabic
- Format: Emergency radio service; News bulletin

Ownership
- Owner: BBC World Service
- Operator: BBC News Arabic

History
- First air date: November 3, 2023

Technical information
- Power: 500 kW
- Transmitter coordinates: 34°37′9″N 33°0′5″E
- Translators: British East Mediterranean Relay Station, Akrotiri and Dhekelia

Radio transmitter location in Akrotiri and Dhekelia, relative to Gaza and main production site in Cairo

Gaza Daily is an emergency radio service launched by BBC News Arabic in response to the ongoing conflict in the Gaza Strip during the Gaza war to "provide listeners in Gaza with the latest information and developments as well as safety advice on where to access shelter, food, and water supplies".

== Background ==
=== Gaza war ===
The Gaza Strip, a densely populated Palestinian territory, has faced significant challenges due to the conflict. Communication infrastructure disruptions caused by air strikes have left civilians without reliable access to essential information. In this context, the BBC World Service urgently produced a dedicated radio service that could deliver timely updates and safety advice to the affected population despite internet and phone infrastructure collapse.

=== BBC World Service ===
The BBC World Service is the world's largest external broadcaster in terms of reception area, language selection and audience reach. The World Service has responded to emergency situations in the past. Notably:

- In May 2023, during the War in Sudan, BBC News Arabic initiated an emergency radio service.
- In February 2022, BBC News Ukrainian extended TV bulletins following the Russo-Ukrainian War.
- In 2014, BBC Media Action launched a service for Gaza during the 2014 Gaza War.

== Broadcasting ==
Gaza Daily launched on 3 November 2023, broadcasting on mediumwave AM radio at a frequency of 639 kHz from the British East Mediterranean Relay Station, situated by Lady's Mile Beach, Western Sovereign Base Area, Akrotiri and Dhekelia, which had remained unused by the BBC since April 2015.

== Programming ==
External videos
- BBC Emergency Radio Service for Gaza first broadcast opening

Since November 10, 2023 Gaza Daily has run two daily programmes with content produced in Cairo and London. The programming consists of one daily programme at 1500 GMT and a daily update at 0500 GMT.

Between November 3, 2023 and November 10, 2023 Gaza Daily ran a single daily programme at 1500 GMT.

Liliane Landor, Director of BBC World Service said that BBC News Arabic will offer the service for the people of Gaza at a time of need. The BBC's record in the region, along with its reputation will help provide information to Gaza’s civilians."
