= BBC Far Eastern Relay Station =

Shortwave radio transmitter station in Malaysia and Singapore

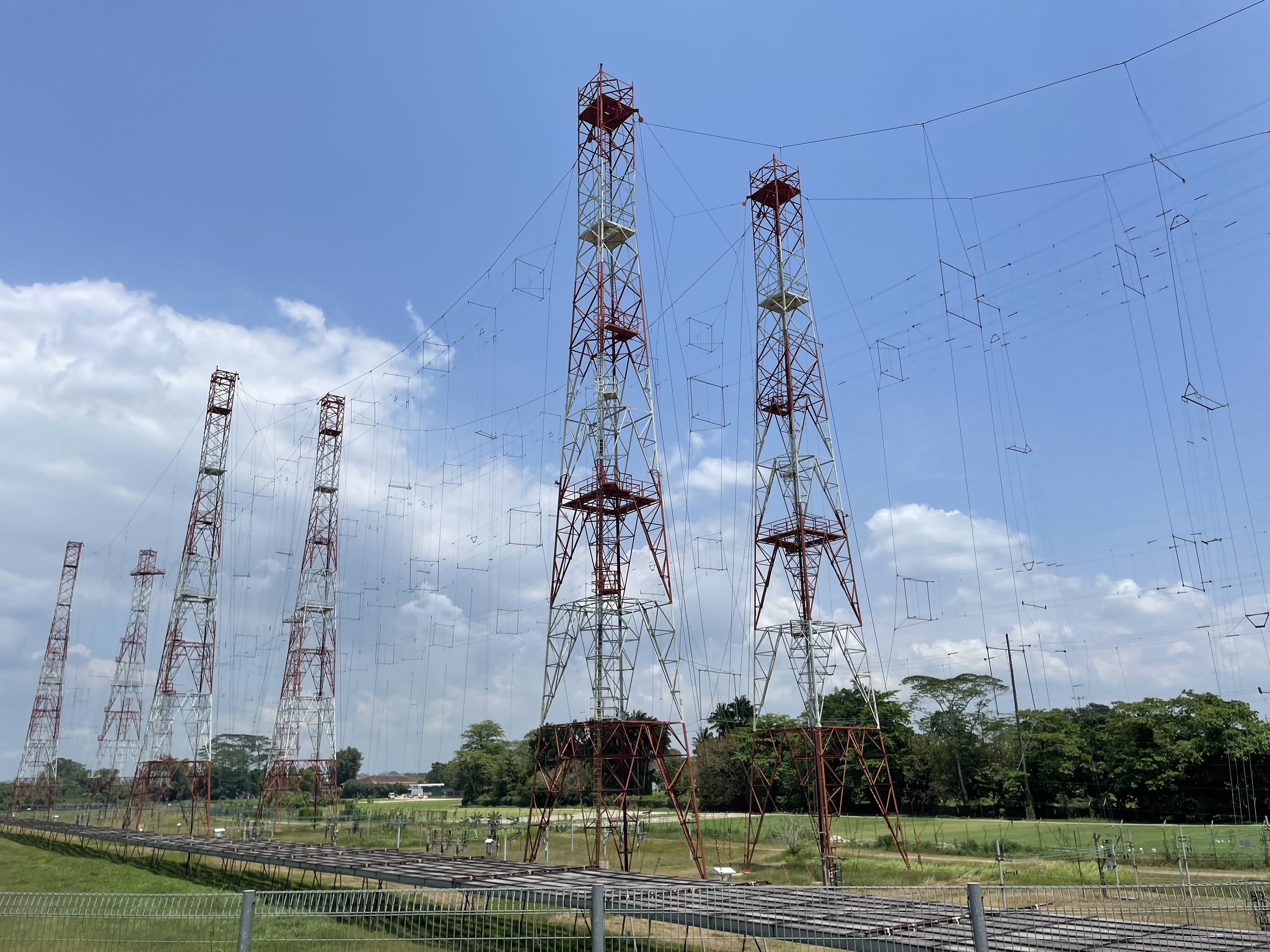

- Location within Singapore
- Location: Kranji, Sungei Kadut, Singapore
- Coordinates: 1.4201524°N 103.7278319°E
- Built: 1977; 49 years ago
- Demolished: 2023; 3 years ago

The BBC Far Eastern Relay Station was a broadcast relay station for the BBC World Service and its radio programmes to large parts of Asia on shortwave. Transmitting from a number of different sites, most notably Tebrau in Malaysia (1953 to 1979) and later Kranji in Singapore (1979 to 2023), the station formed part of a global network of BBC "relay" stations. These stations, named for their role in "relaying" programmes originally produced in London, included other key sites such as Cyprus, Hong Kong and Oman. The relay station served a crucial function in delivering the BBC's news and programming to millions of listeners in Asia during the post-war period, particularly at the height of the Cold War.

Each transmitting site was developed on a substantial scale and included studios, a transmitter hall and extensive feeder cables running out to a vast "aerial field" where numerous masts supported a sophisticated array of antennas. These installations enabled the simultaneous transmission of several radio programmes to different regions using multiple bands and wavelengths. At least at the Tebrau facility, the infrastructure also featured residential quarters for around one hundred staff members and their families, drawn from various ethnic backgrounds. The compound further included recreational and social amenities, creating a self-contained community around the station. It ceased operations in July 2023, concluding 75 years of service, as the land on which it operated was earmarked for redevelopment by the Singapore Government.

== History ==
=== Origins ===
In 1937 the BBC began planning a shortwave transmitting station to relay BBC World Service signals from the United Kingdom to the Far East.

As World War II began, a Marconi 100 kW HF sender (as the BBC termed transmitting equipment) was sent by sea to Singapore, but was lost when the vessel carrying it sank due to enemy action. A second attempt was thwarted by the advance of Japanese forces through Malaya.

So it was not until after the end of hostilities, in 1946, that the BBC began broadcasting from four 10 kW Marconi type SWB11 transmitters at Jurong in Singapore. This equipment, which had previously been used in Sri Lanka, now transmitted live programmes in English, Burmese, Indonesian and Thai from the purpose-built studios at Singapore's Cathay Building as The British Far Eastern Broadcasting Service. These studios moved to Caldecott Hill in 1949, a site which remained a centre for broadcasting in Singapore until 2015.

However, local generation of live BBC programmes ceased in 1951, with the exception of some English language announcements. Programmes were now relayed from London using signals picked up by two Rhombic antennas and a Beverage antenna feeding AR-88 diversity and Mullard ISB type GRF552 receivers. This equipment was initially housed in an empty bungalow at the water filtering site at Woodleigh, now part of Toa Payoh.

=== The Tebrau site (1953–1979) ===
By the early 1950s, the station had relocated to a major new site at Tebrau, near Johor Bahru on the southern tip of what was then peninsular Malaya, with construction beginning in 1953. The facility was extensive and technologically advanced for its time, playing a vital role in expanding the BBC's shortwave reach across Asia.

By the mid-1970s, however, the Malaysian Government became increasingly uncomfortable with the continued presence of the station, which it saw as an unwelcome reminder of British influence in the region. Officials in Kuala Lumpur made it clear they would not renew the BBC's broadcasting licence, claiming discomfort with the transmission of what they described as "propaganda" by a former colonial power. British diplomatic records indicate that Malaysia's Ministry of Communications had its own interests in acquiring the site, suggesting domestic priorities were placed above the free flow of international broadcasting.

The BBC considered several alternatives, including Brunei and Christmas Island, but no final decision had been reached when Prime Minister of Singapore Lee Kuan Yew, while visiting London for an interview at Bush House, was informed of the issue during a chance encounter with a BBC executive. In a characteristically decisive move, Lee promptly offered Singapore as a new host. His government subsequently provided a 30-acre plot on Turut Track near Kranji, just 30 kilometres across the Straits of Johor, where construction of the new facility began. The Malaysian Government agreed to extend the BBC's licence on a yearly basis until the Kranji station was ready. The final broadcast from BBC Tebrau was made on 18 March 1979, and the site was later sold privately, with British officials seeking to avoid further public scrutiny over the BBC's operations on Malaysian territory.

=== The Kranji site (1979–2023) ===
Around the turn of the new millennium, the transmitting station at Kranji began relaying programming from other broadcasters, in addition to the BBC, including NHK World-Japan, Radio Canada International, Radio Australia, and Deutsche Welle. Operation of the station passed from the BBC to a succession of private companies including Merlin, VT Communications, Babcock and Encompass.

=== Closure ===
Following a decision by the Singapore Government to reassign and redevelop the area around the site, closure of the BBC Far Eastern Relay Station and demolition of all its structures was announced in July 2023.

== Operations ==
=== Tebrau ===
The site, on the southern tip of peninsular Malaysia just outside the city of Johor Bahru, covered 180 hectares of what was at the time virgin jungle, with construction beginning in 1953. There were originally six transmitters – two 100 kW Marconis and four 7.5 kW Marconis transferred from Jurong in Singapore – and some 20 antenna masts, with power being generated by three enormous diesel electricity generators. In the early 1960s, the low-powered 7.5kW units were removed and replaced with six more transmitters, making a total of six at 100 kW and four at 250 kW.

At its height, BBC Tebrau was on air with a total power output of 1.6 megawatts, broadcasting from 10 transmitters and a huge array of more than 20 curtain antennas. The feeder lines, which fed the signal from the transmitter hall to the antennas, ran for more than a quarter of a mile across green fields and down into a valley, the longest known feeder lines in the history of shortwave broadcasting.

=== Kranji ===
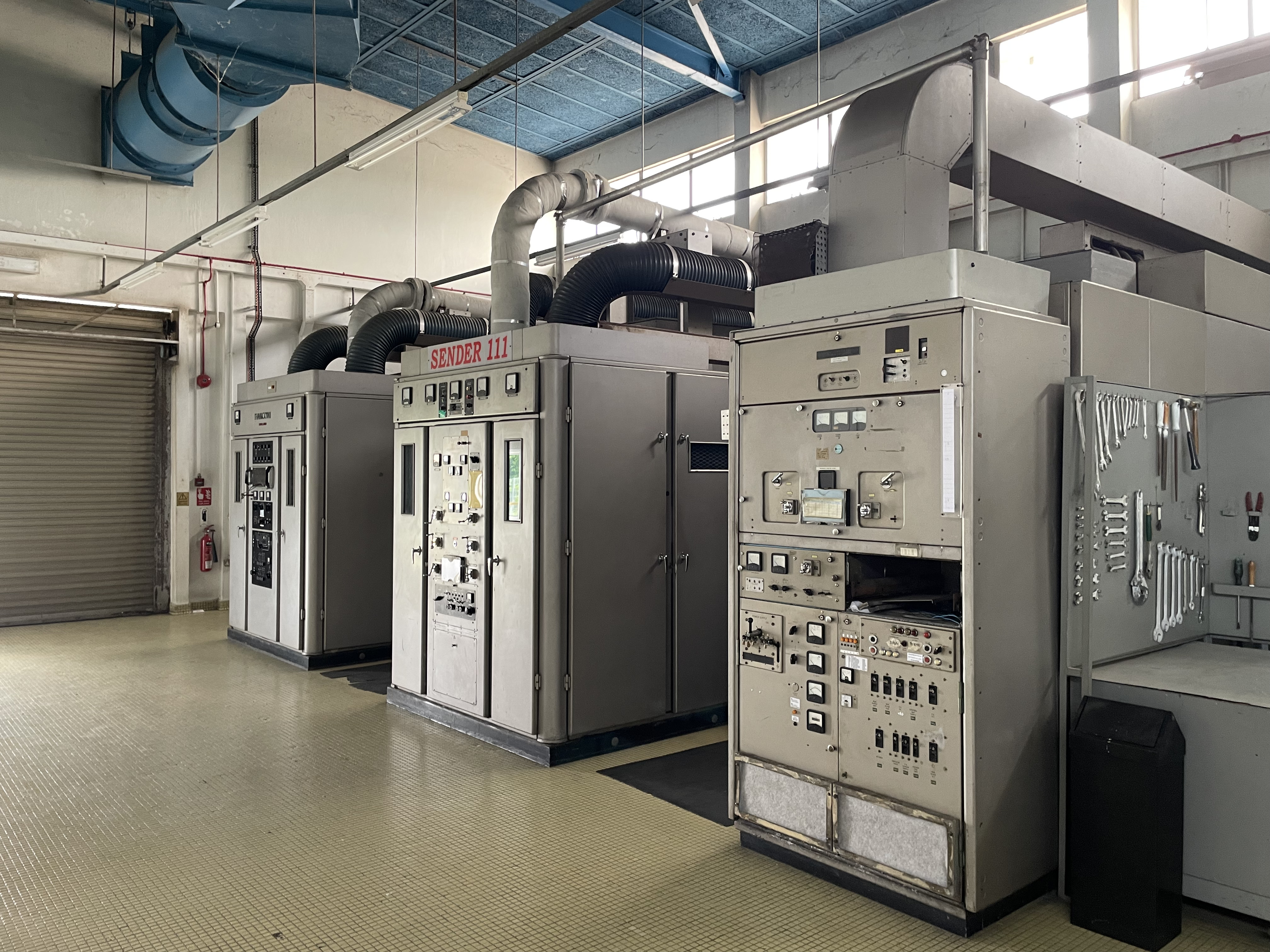
Multiple senders (radio transmitters) were housed in a large hall at BBC Far Eastern Relay station

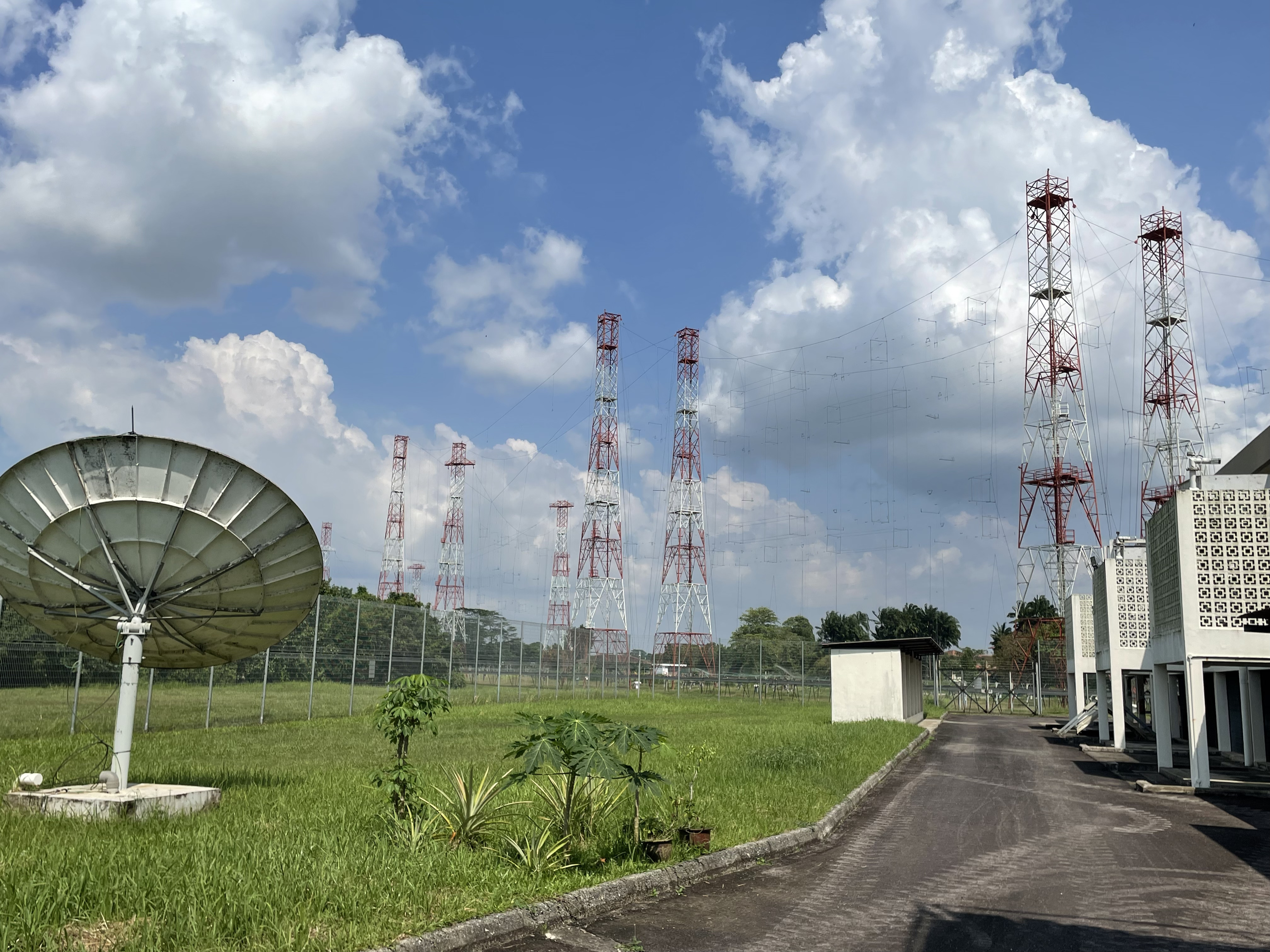
Downlink satellite dish and shortwave broadcast antenna arrays at BBC Far Eastern Relay Station

Construction began on an antenna field initially comprising 17 towers supporting 14 Marconi 4-Band Kraus, 4 BBC dual-band and one 4 MHz array. While the swampy ground required substantial earthworks, its proximity to salt water offered high electrical conductivity advantageous to effective radiation from the antennas. A transmitter hall similar to the design of Woofferton transmitting station was completed and 4 x 250 kW Marconi B6122 and 4 x 100 kW Marconi B6123 senders were relocated from Tebrau. This equipment began service on 1 February 1978 and installation was completed in March 1979.

By this time, the receiving station feeding the senders at Kranji had moved twice, first to Yew Tee Army Camp, where Plessey PRD200, Plessey PRD200, Racal RA133A Diversity and bandscanner receivers operated using an existing military antenna. That temporary arrangement was replaced on 1 December 1977 by a new receiving station at Sungei Punggol on the banks of the river. The receiving station building, a Marconi omni-directional antenna and one antenna tower were on dry land with the remaining 7 towers supporting 4 Rhombic and 2 sloping V aerials erected over the river estuary and only accessible by boat. 6 Plessey PRD200, 10 Channel diversity receivers, a Plessey PR2250 search receiver and a Plessey PR2250 receiver modified for bandscanning were now used to capture the signal to be relayed, all under remote control from the transmitting site at Kranji. The link between receivers and transmitters was carried by two paths to offer redundancy: a cabled PCM system, and a radio link on the hill at Bukit Timah. With the arrival of a satellite feed of the programmes from London, the Punggol receiving station was demoted to backup status until its closure in 1990.

During this period an extra tower and an array covering 15–21 MHz were added at Kranji, with automatic equipment to turn the senders on and off, to assign and slew the beam radiated from the antennas, to select programmes, and to control tape machines. In 1987, the installation of an additional Marconi BD272 250 kW transmitter brought from Daventry transmitting station increased the number of senders to 9, followed by another similar unit from Skelton transmitting station two years later. At its peak of operation in the 1980s, the station employed 55 staff and broadcast over 100 hours of programming daily, running up a monthly power bill exceeding SGD400,000.

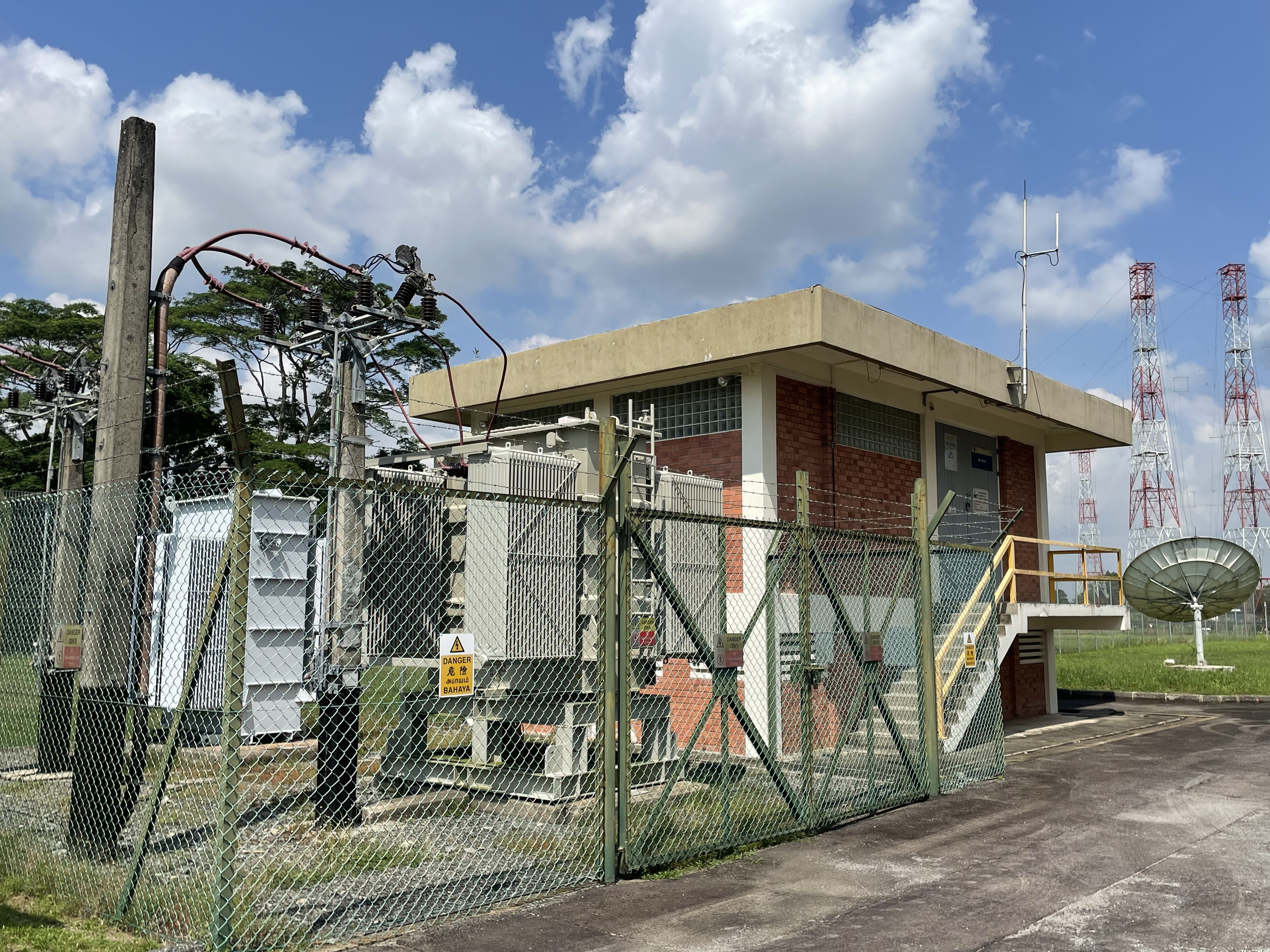
Incoming power substation

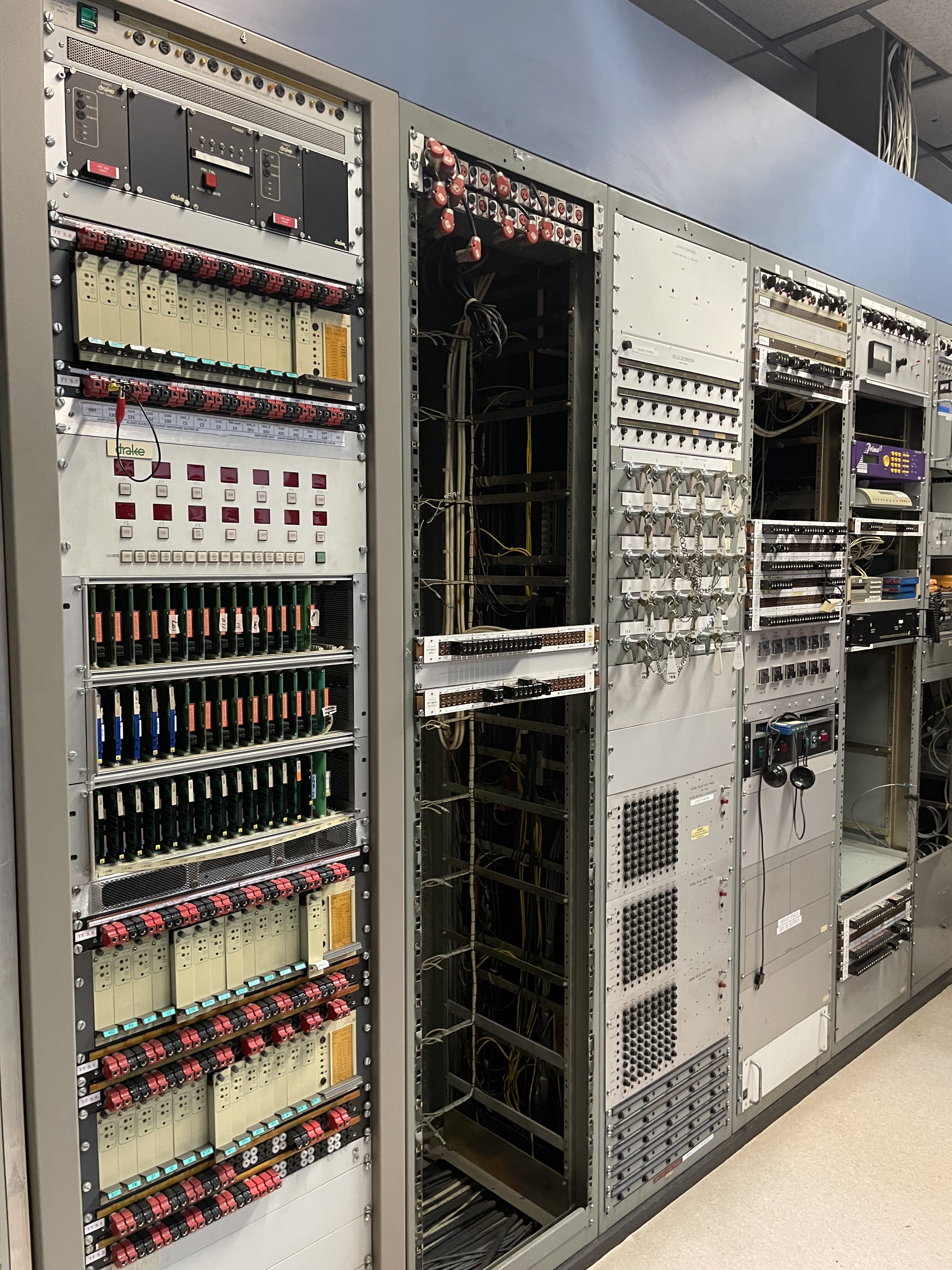
Main control racks

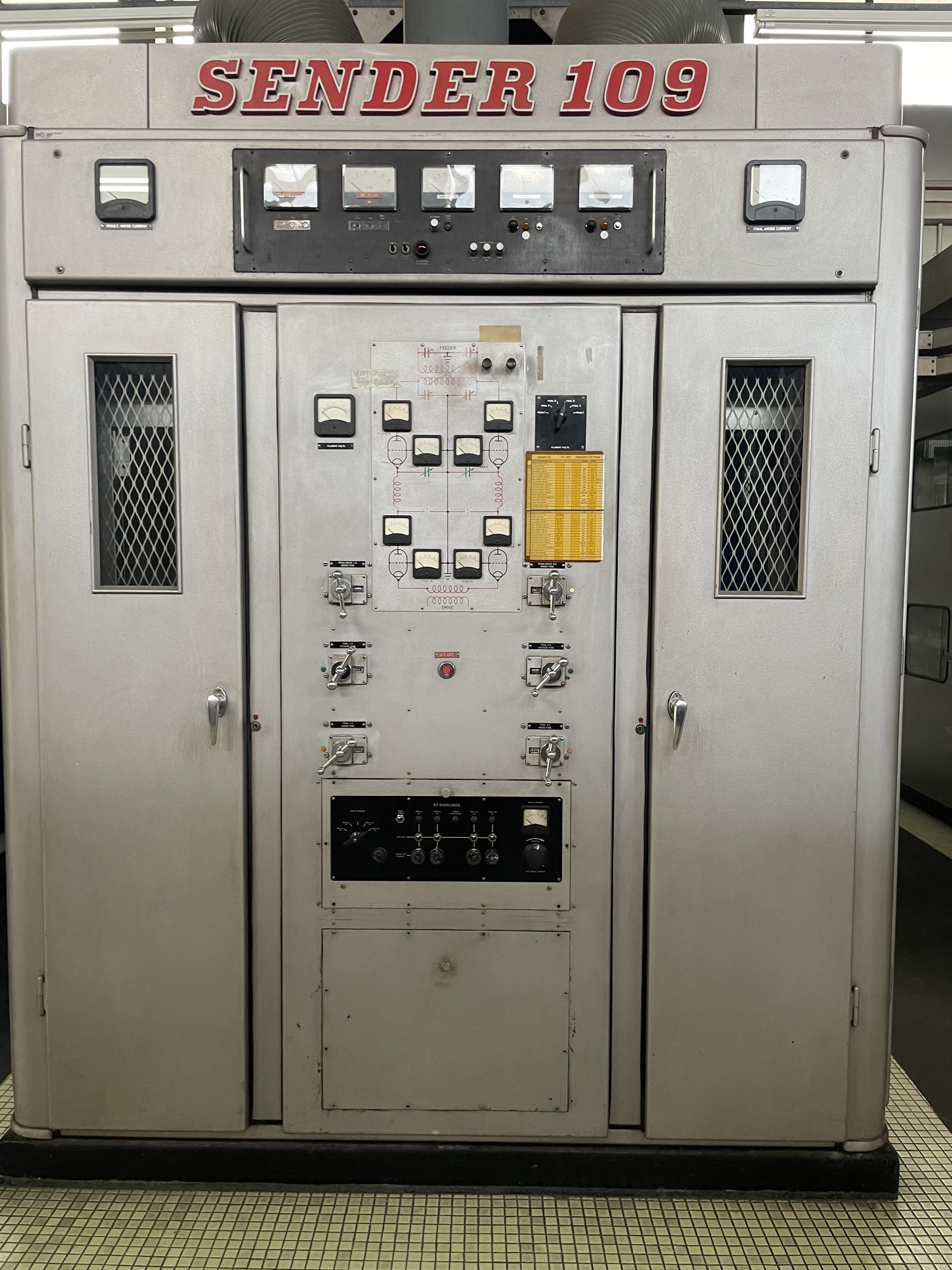
One of several types of sender

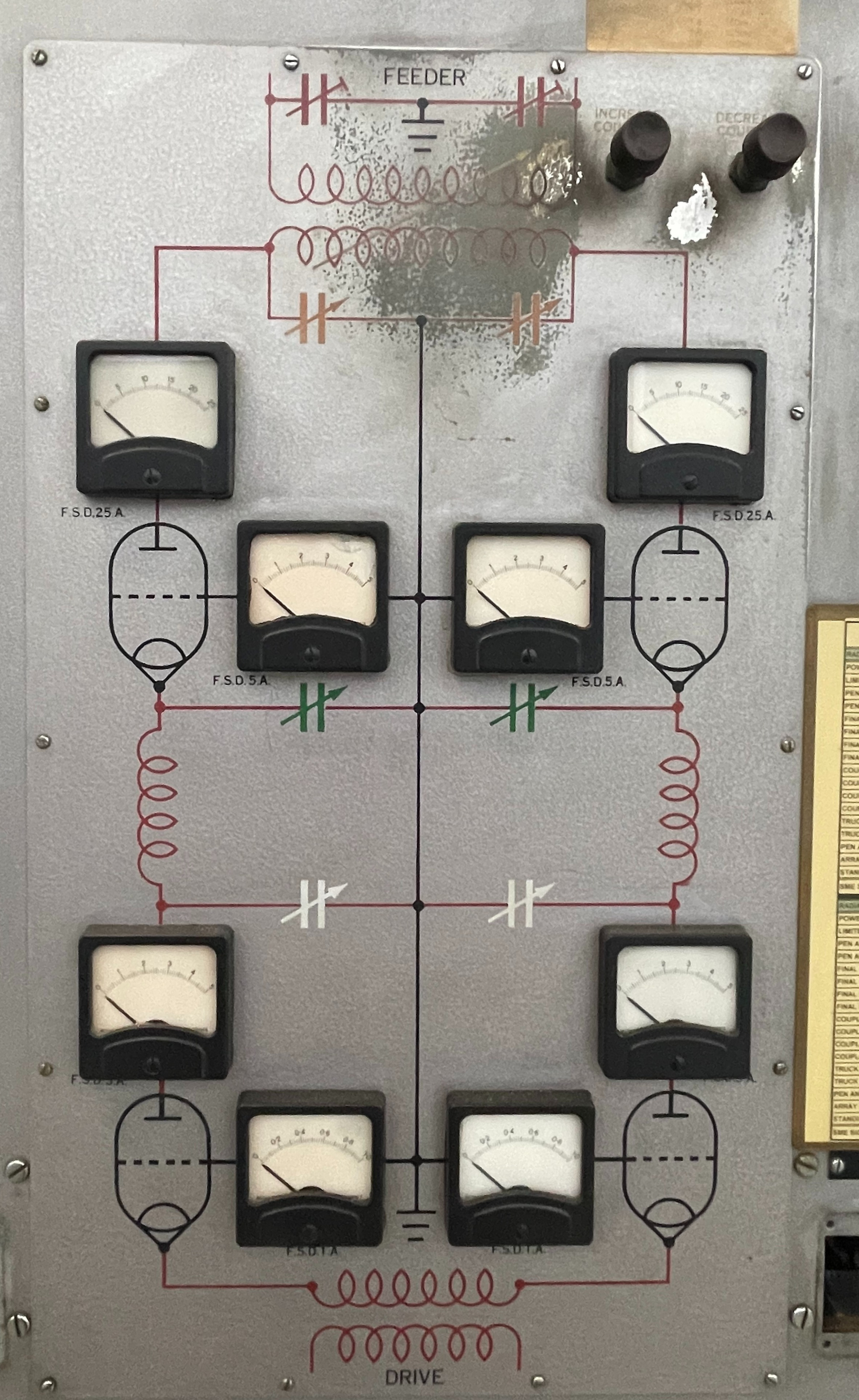
Sender metering

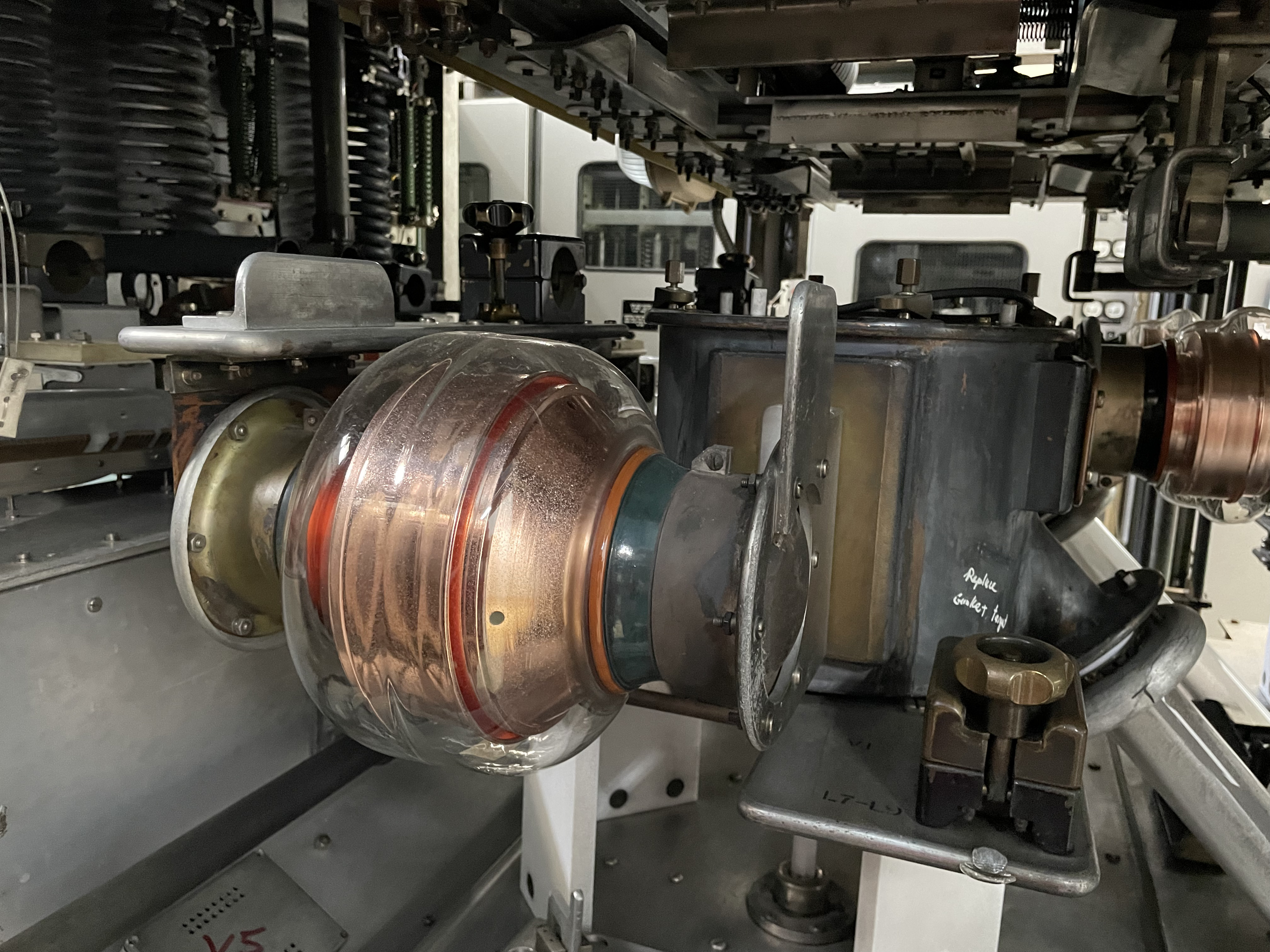
Vacuum variable capacitor

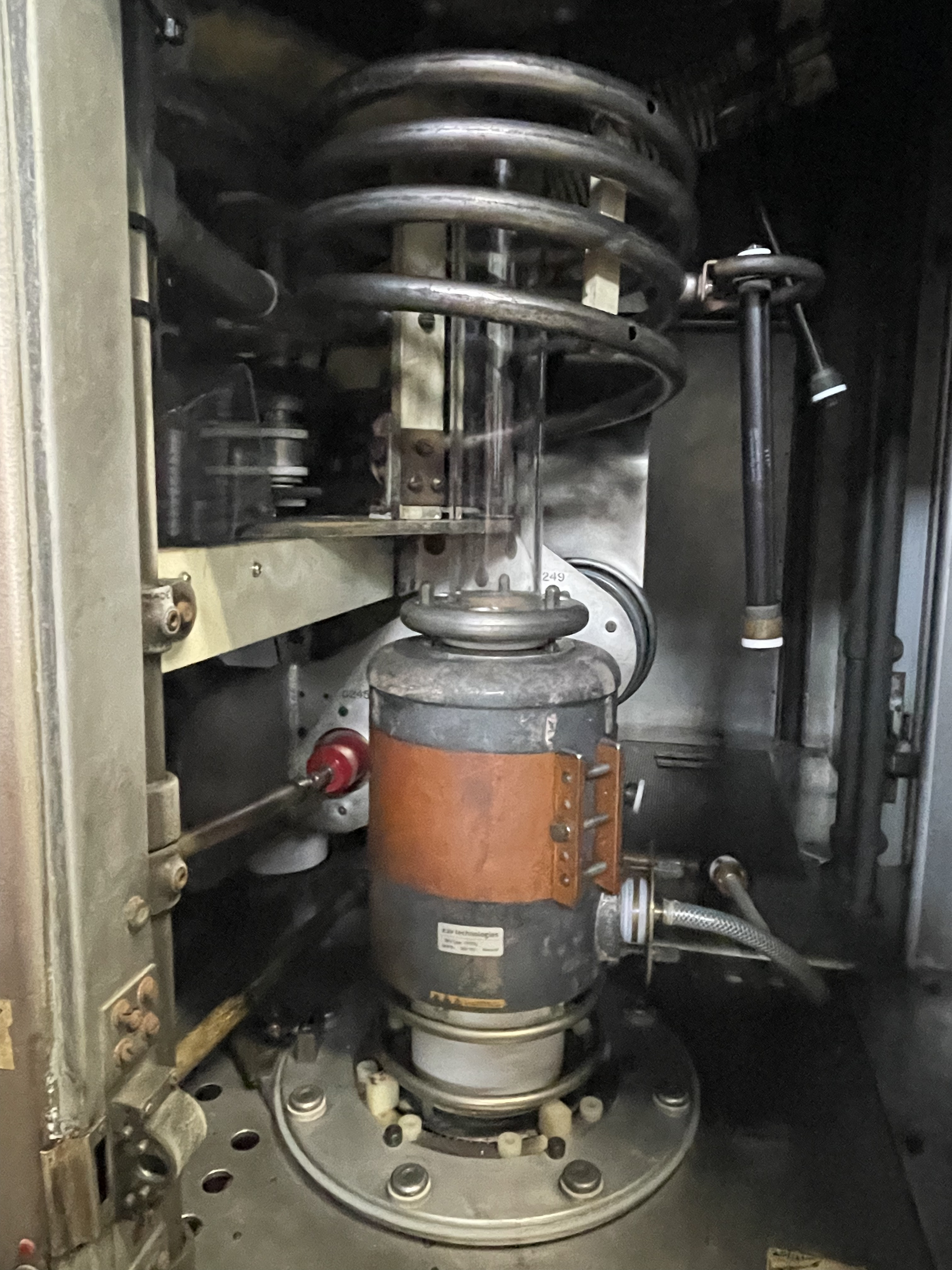
Water cooled vacuum tube

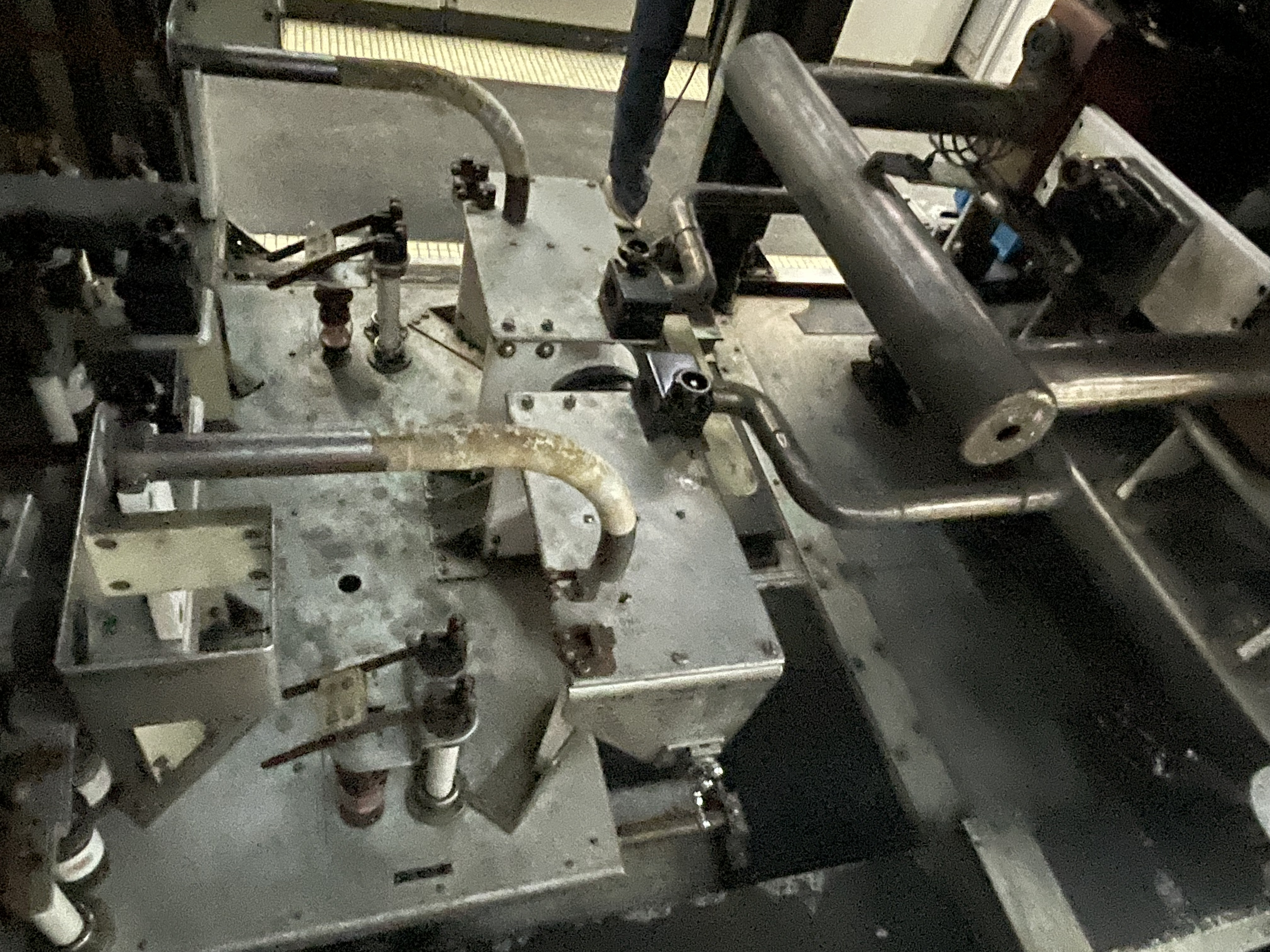
Antenna coupling transformer

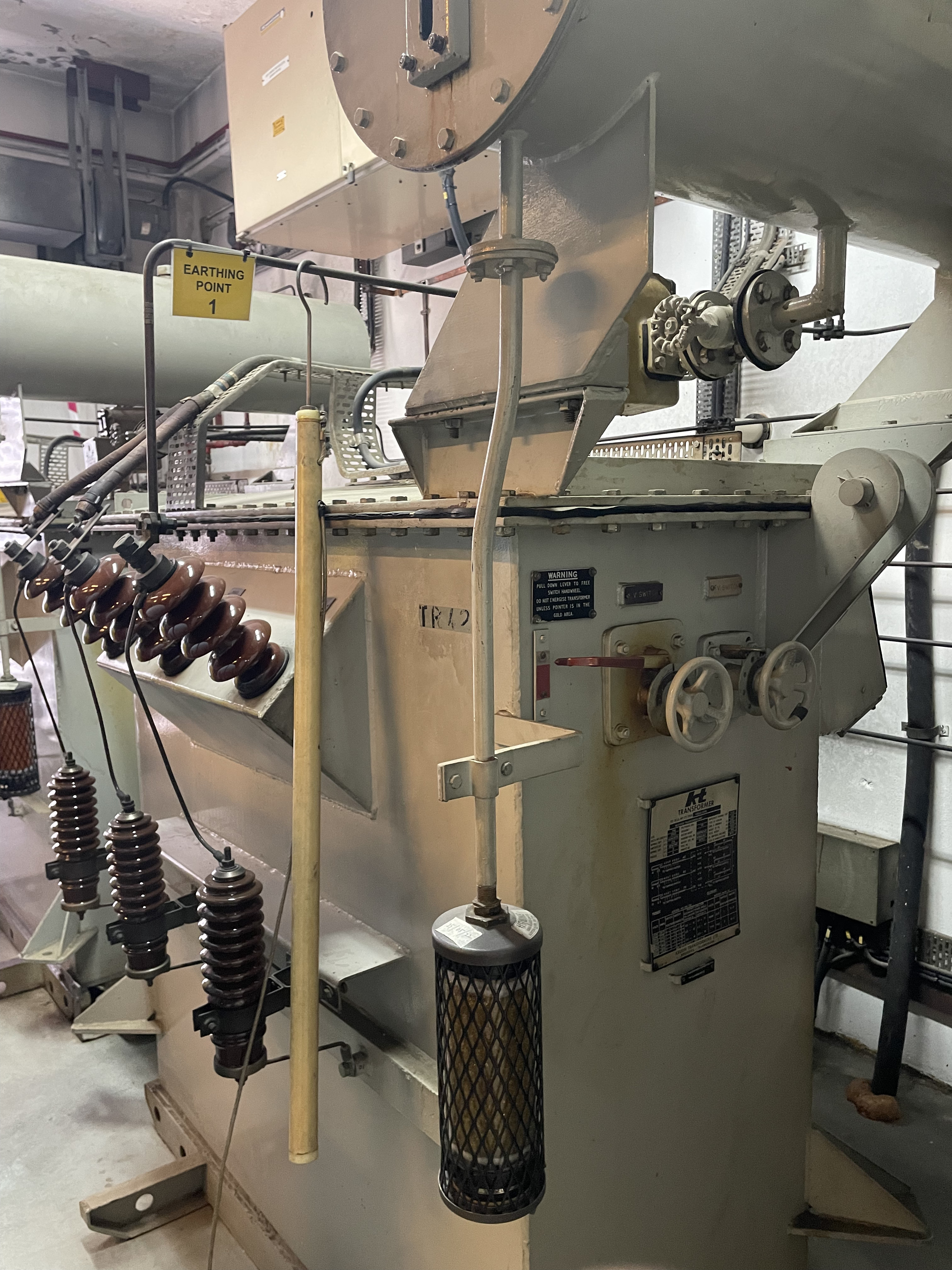
Modulation transformer

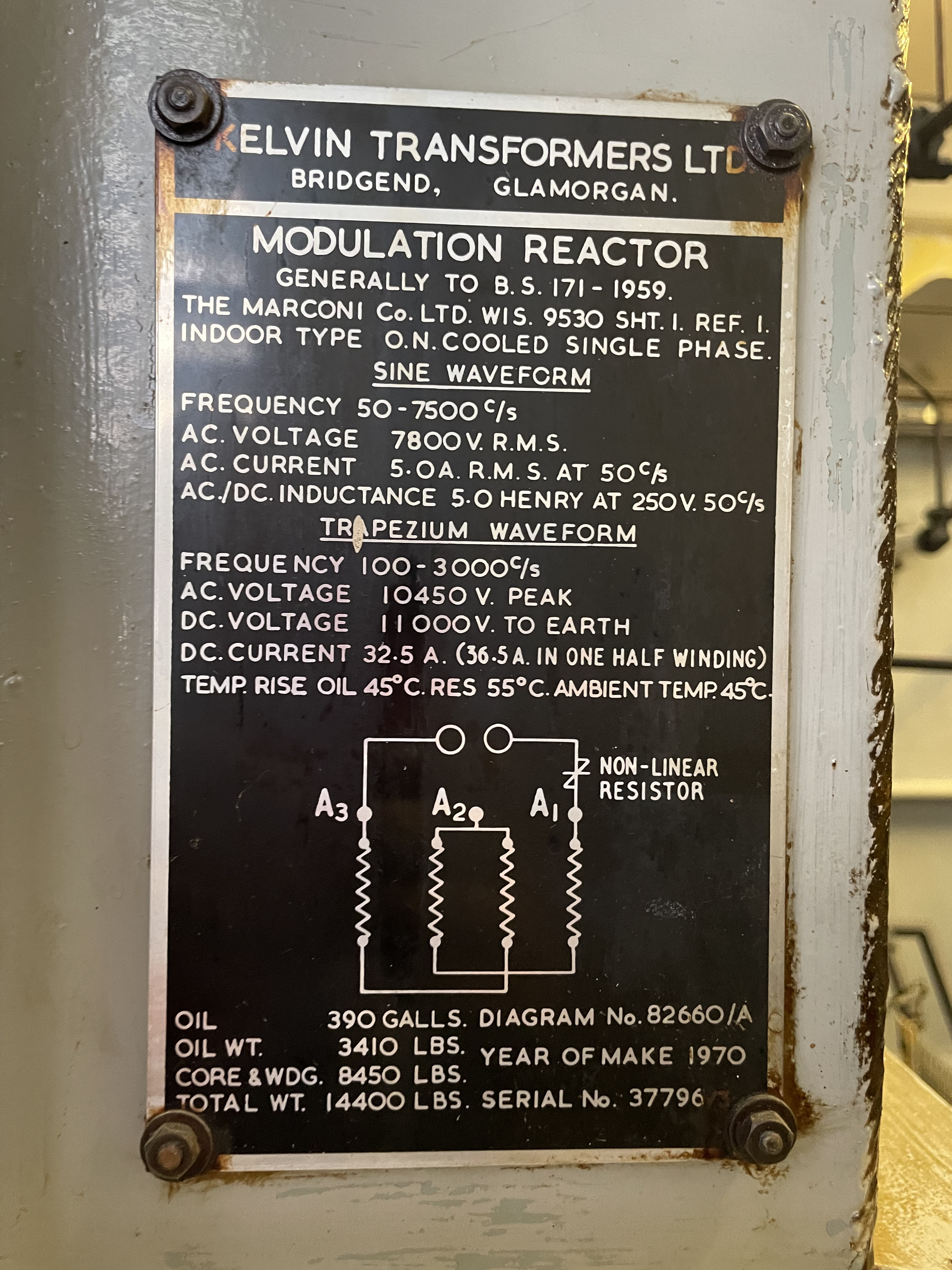
Modulation reactor detail

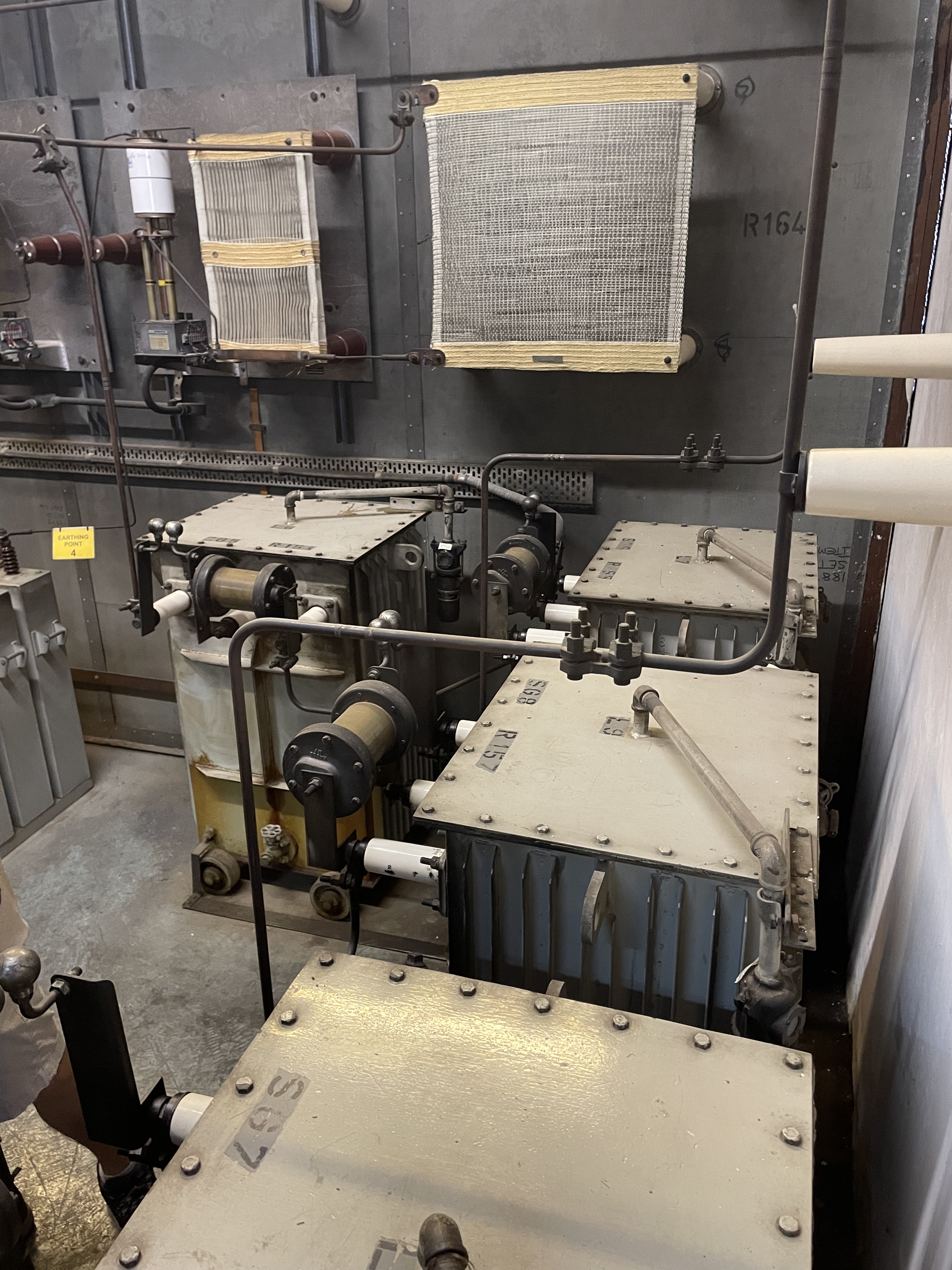
High voltage DC power supply

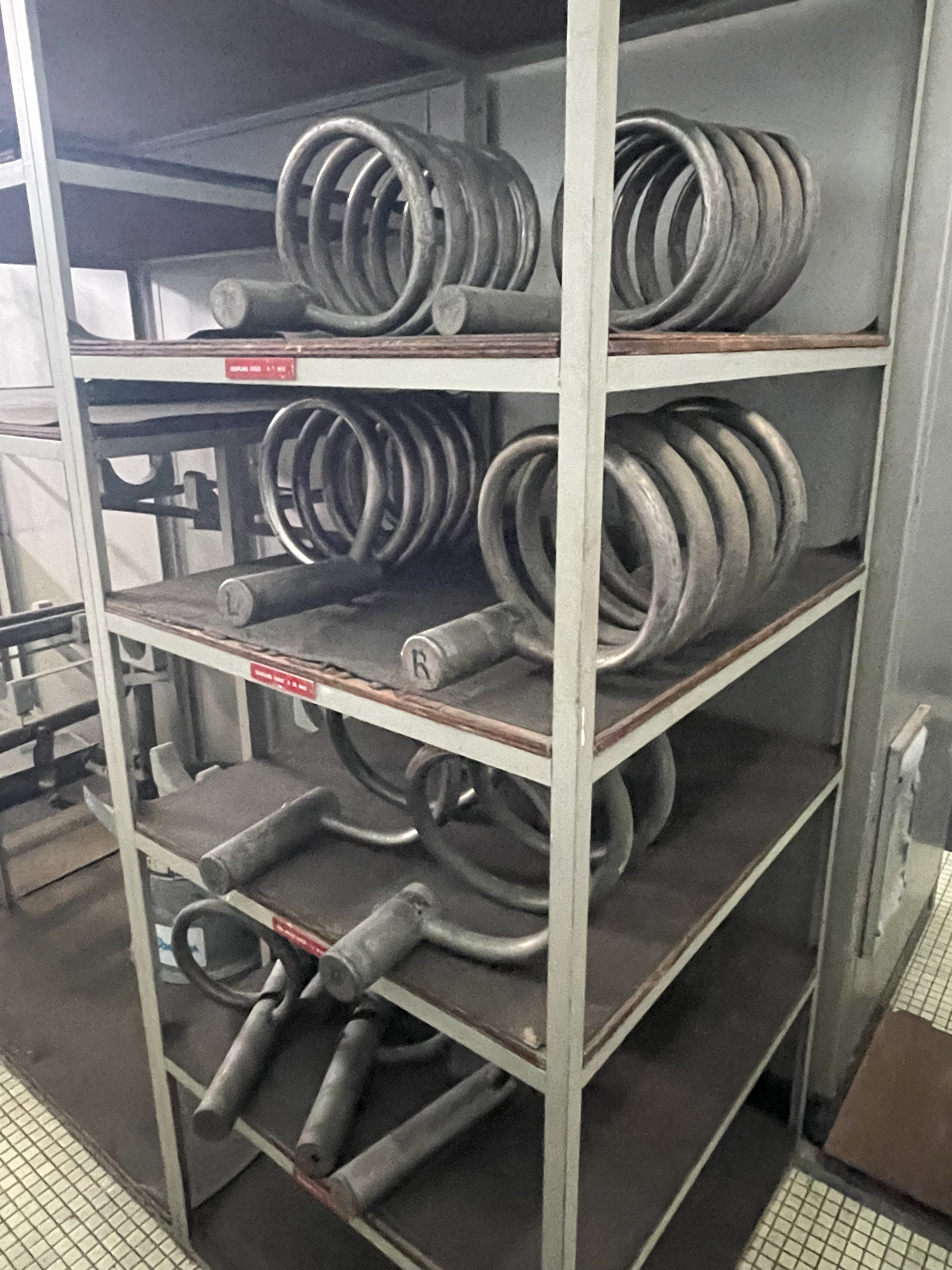
Coupling coils for various frequencies

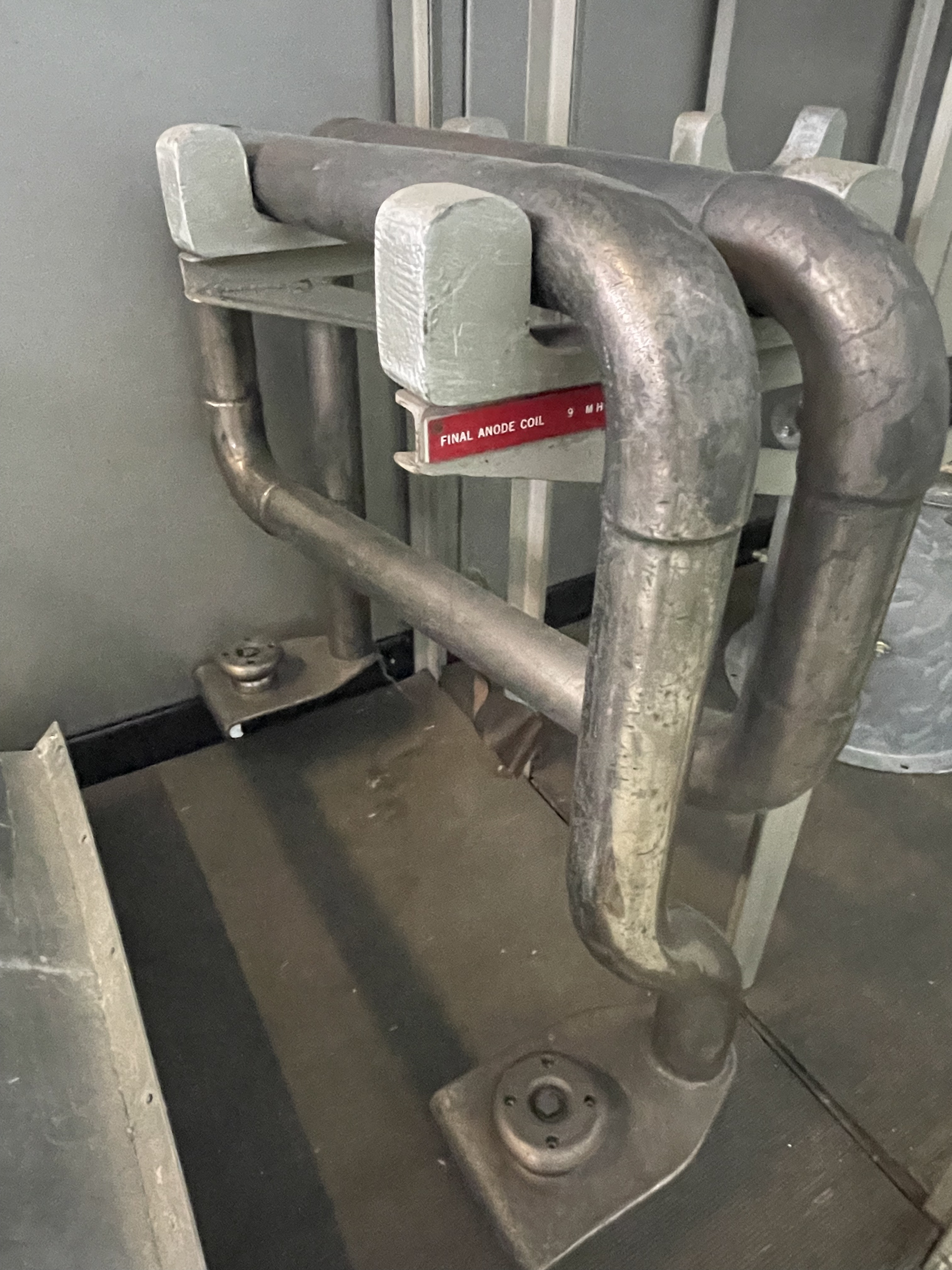
Output coupling coil

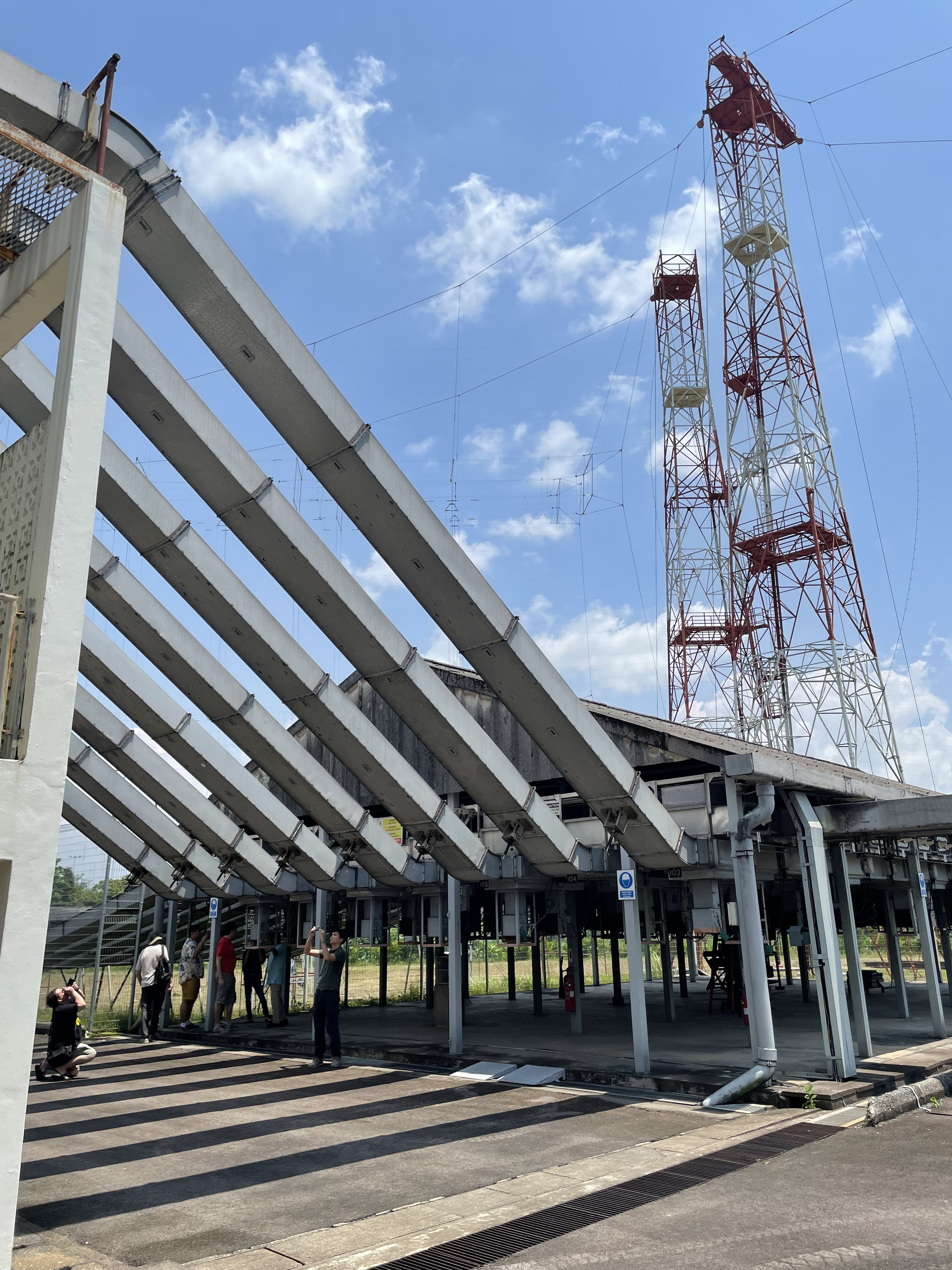
Antenna feed lines and switch matrix

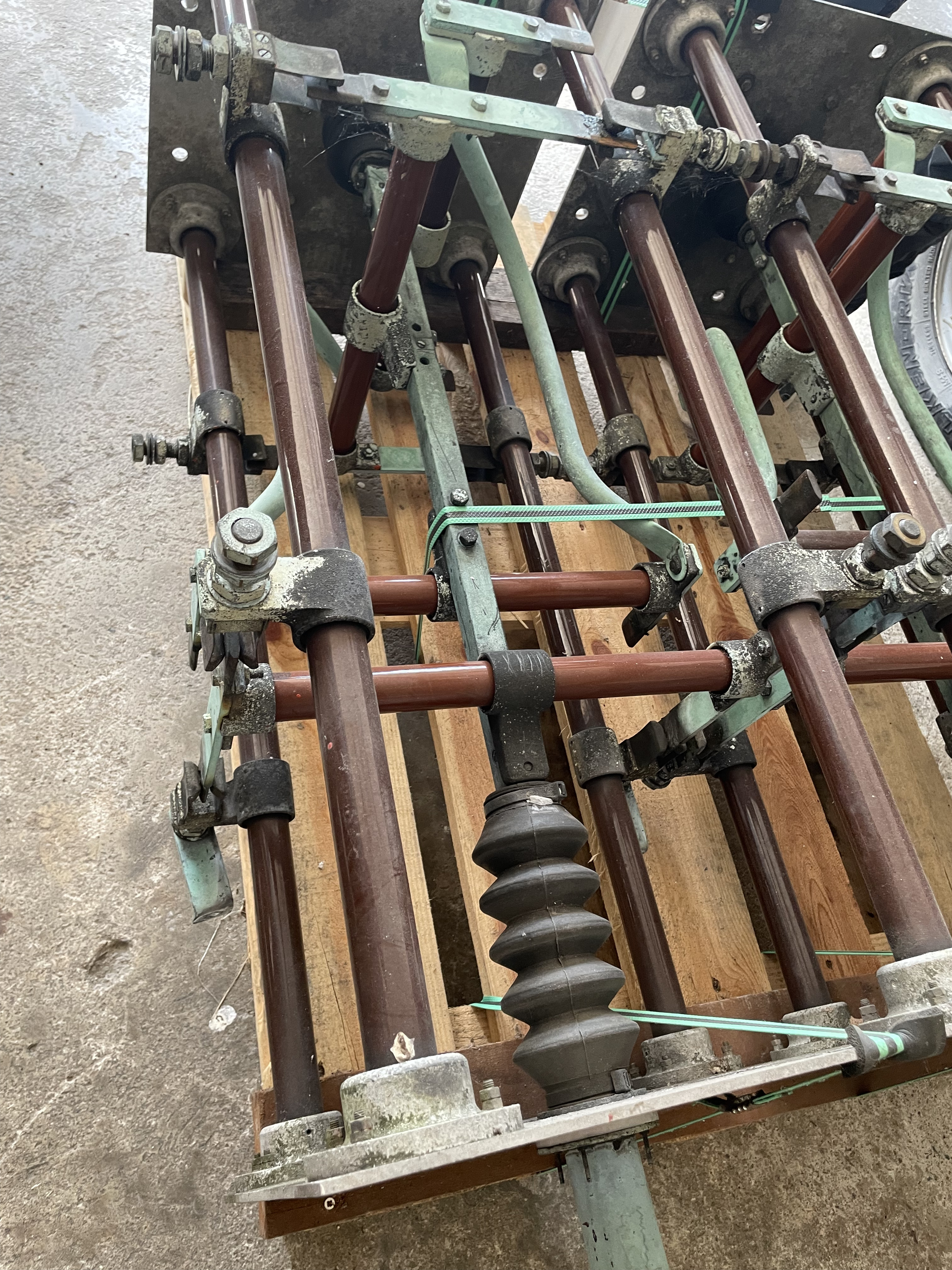
Antenna feedline switch

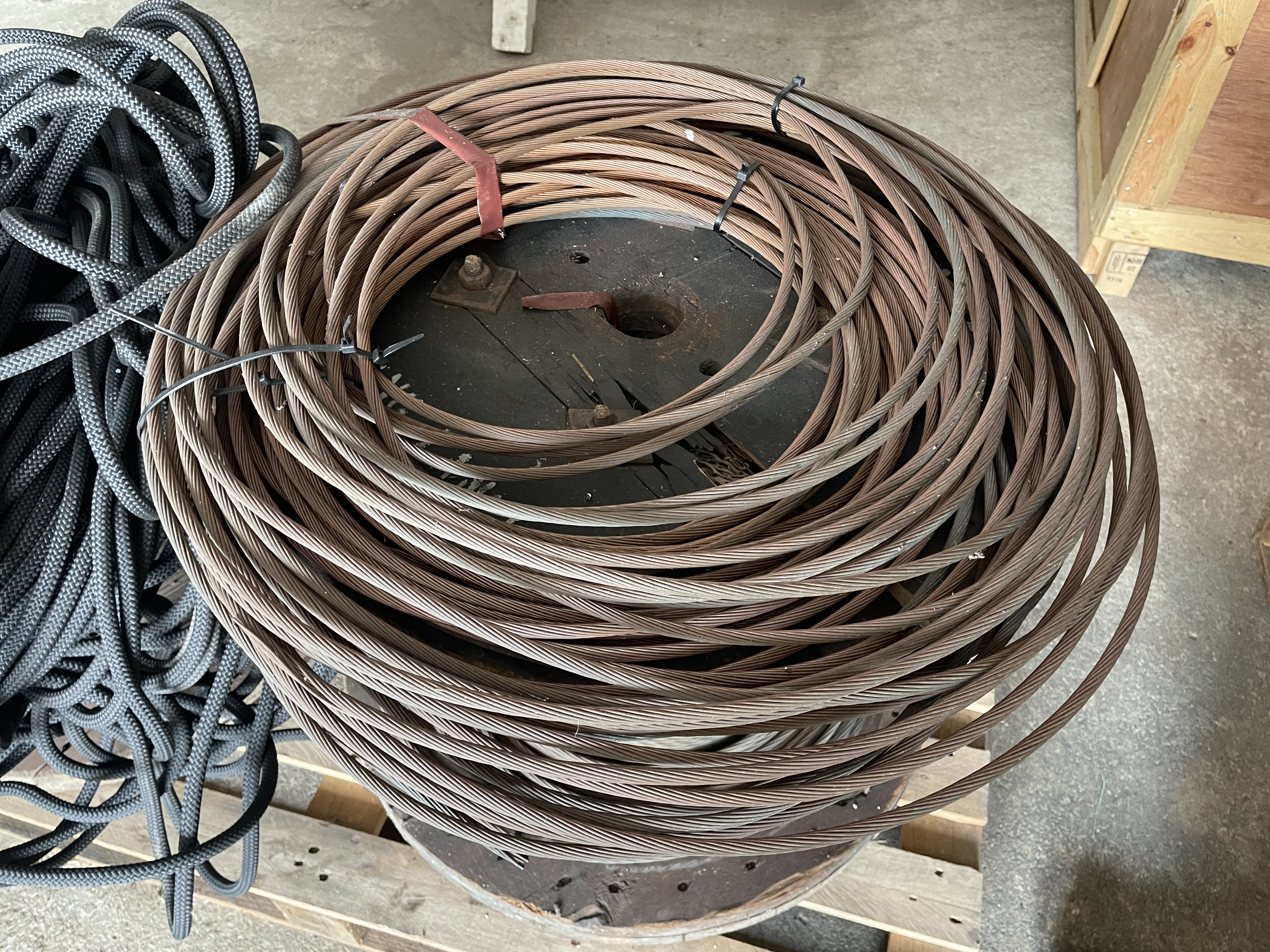
Phosphor-Bronze-Copper antenna wire

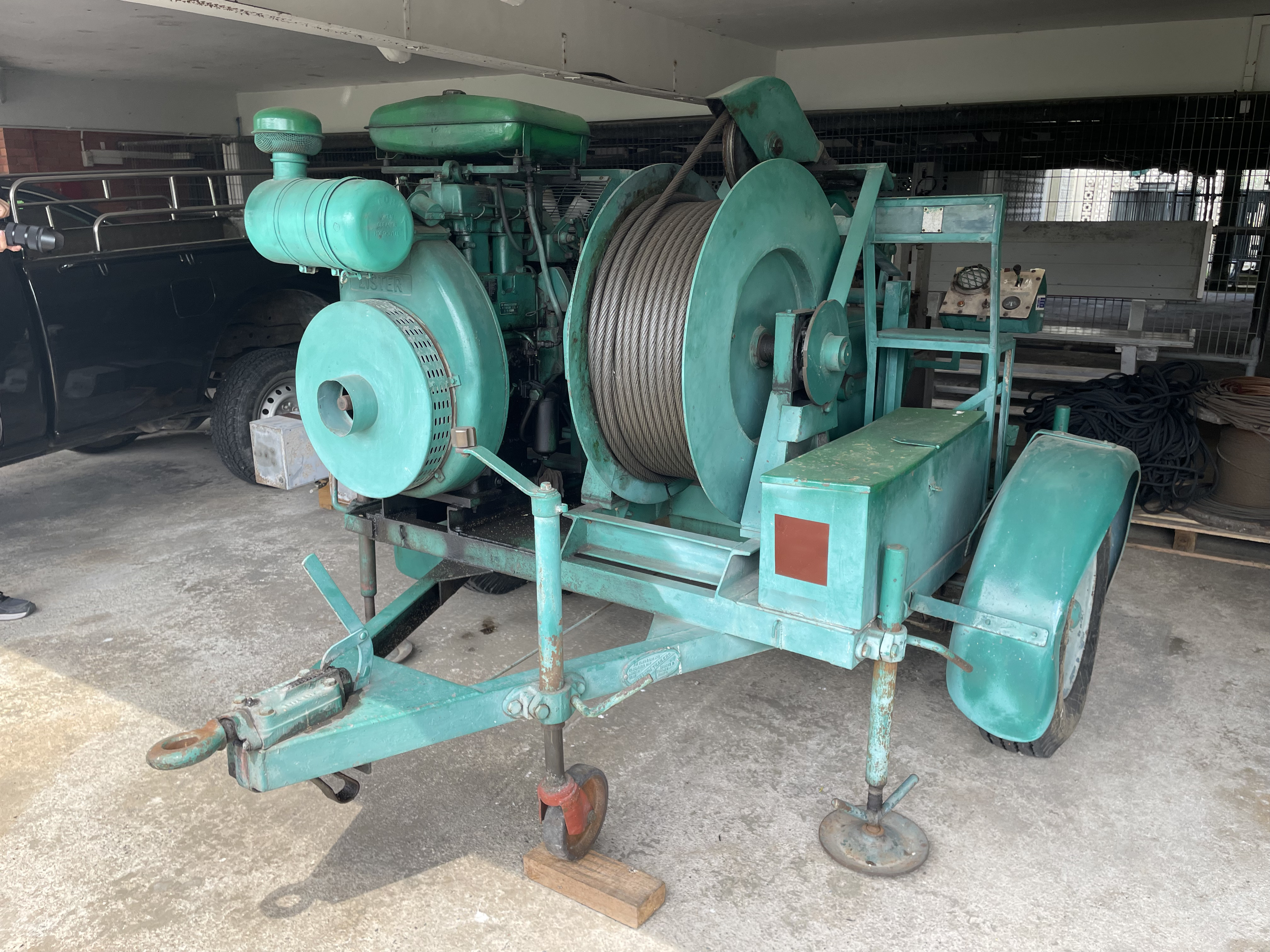
Antenna winch
