= Near East Broadcasting Station =

The Near East Broadcasting Station (also

إذاعة الشرق الأدنى, Voice of Britain) started broadcasting in Arabic in 1941/1942 from Jaffa, Mandate of Palestine. It was fully financed and run by the British government. The goal of the broadcasts was to "entice Arabs to join British and British-backed military forces, as well as to maintain political and economic stability in Palestine". The broadcasts were also started as an answer to similar propaganda radio stations broadcasting in Arabic set up first by Mussolini, later the German Nazi regime. The British also looked beyond World War II, as they wanted to remain an influence in the Middle East, where oil had been discovered in the early 1930s.

The station first started operation under the name Freedom Broadcasting Station, using Royal Air Force equipment in Jaffa. It was under the full control of the British Special Operations Executive and initially concerned itself with broadcasting to the Balkans. However, from an early point, it also broadcast in Arabic. The material broadcast at SOE's direction sometimes clashed with material broadcast by more official British stations and caused disputes within the British Directorate of Propaganda. In March 1943, the station was handed over to the Political Warfare Executive. After the war, it became a Foreign Office responsibility and, although its legal status was changed into that of a commercial broadcaster, the British government kept firm control.

From the beginning the identity of the station's owner and operator was an official secret. Officially, Britain had nothing to do with the Near East Broadcasting Station: Britain only acknowledged responsibility for the BBC and its widely respected "Arab service". As late as 16 June 1948, in response to a Parliamentary Question, Foreign Secretary Ernest Bevin denied that the station was run by the British Foreign Office Information Department, claiming instead that it was "operated by a group of people connected with the Arabs".

Just before the British left Palestine, in early May 1948, the station was moved to Cyprus (which still was under British control). In Cyprus the station initially used four short-wave transmitters near Limasol.

After the armistice in 1948, the station seemed to be aiming to make the programs as popular as possible, thereby attracting advertisers. News and music were large ingredients. The station had a staff of about 70 in Cyprus, in addition to many news correspondents around the Arab world. In the early 1950s the potential audience size increased greatly, as the station also started transmitting on a medium-wave transmitter.

The radio station's association with the British was not a secret to the observant listener, as the British politician Barbara Castle wrote in 1956 that the station 'kept in touch with the Foreign Office and had helped to "sell" British policy, as well as British exports, in Arab countries — all the more successfully because it was not tied to official directives'. British historian Peter Partner wrote that "Few people who listened to the station were in much doubt that there was a British hand in its control, though no one, naturally, knew what official body in Britain was responsible."

== 1956 Suez Crisis ==
In 1956 the Egyptian leader, Gamal Abdel Nasser, nationalized the Suez Canal Company, which operated the Suez Canal. During the ensuing Suez Crisis, France and Britain supported Israel's invasion of Egypt. Very early in the Suez Crisis, it was revealed that the Near East Broadcasting Station was under the control of either British intelligence, the British military, or both. Renamed the "Voice of Britain", it started broadcasting anti-Nasser news and messages asking civilians to keep clear of military targets. The station was turned over to the BBC at the end of March 1957 (see British East Mediterranean Relay Station).

== Sources ==
- Boyd, Douglas A. (2003). "Sharq Al-Adna/The Voice of Britain: The UK's 'Secret' Arabic Radio Station and Suez War Propaganda Disaster" (PDF). Gazette: The International Journal for Communication Studies. 65 (6). Leiden, Netherlands: 443–455. doi:10.1177/0016549203065006002. ISSN 0016-5492.
- Hardy, Roger (2023). "Remembering Sharq Al-Adna: British Radio Propaganda in the Middle East, 1941–1956". Asian Affairs. 54 (1): 106–124. doi:10.1080/03068374.2022.2152221. ISSN 0306-8374.
- McNicholas, Anthony (2020). "Sharq al-Adna: Covert British Radio and the Development of Arab Broadcasting". Middle East Journal of Culture and Communication. 13 (3): 237–255. doi:10.1163/18739865-20201000. ISSN 1873-9857.
- Stanton, Andrea (2013). "Part of imperial communications: British-Governed Radio in the Middle East, 1934–1949". Media History. 19 (4): 421–435. doi:10.1080/13688804.2013.847141. ISSN 1368-8804.
- Partner, Peter (1988). Arab Voices: The BBC Arabic Service, 1938-1988. British Broadcasting Corporation.
