= British East Mediterranean Relay Station =

Broadcast station in Cyprus

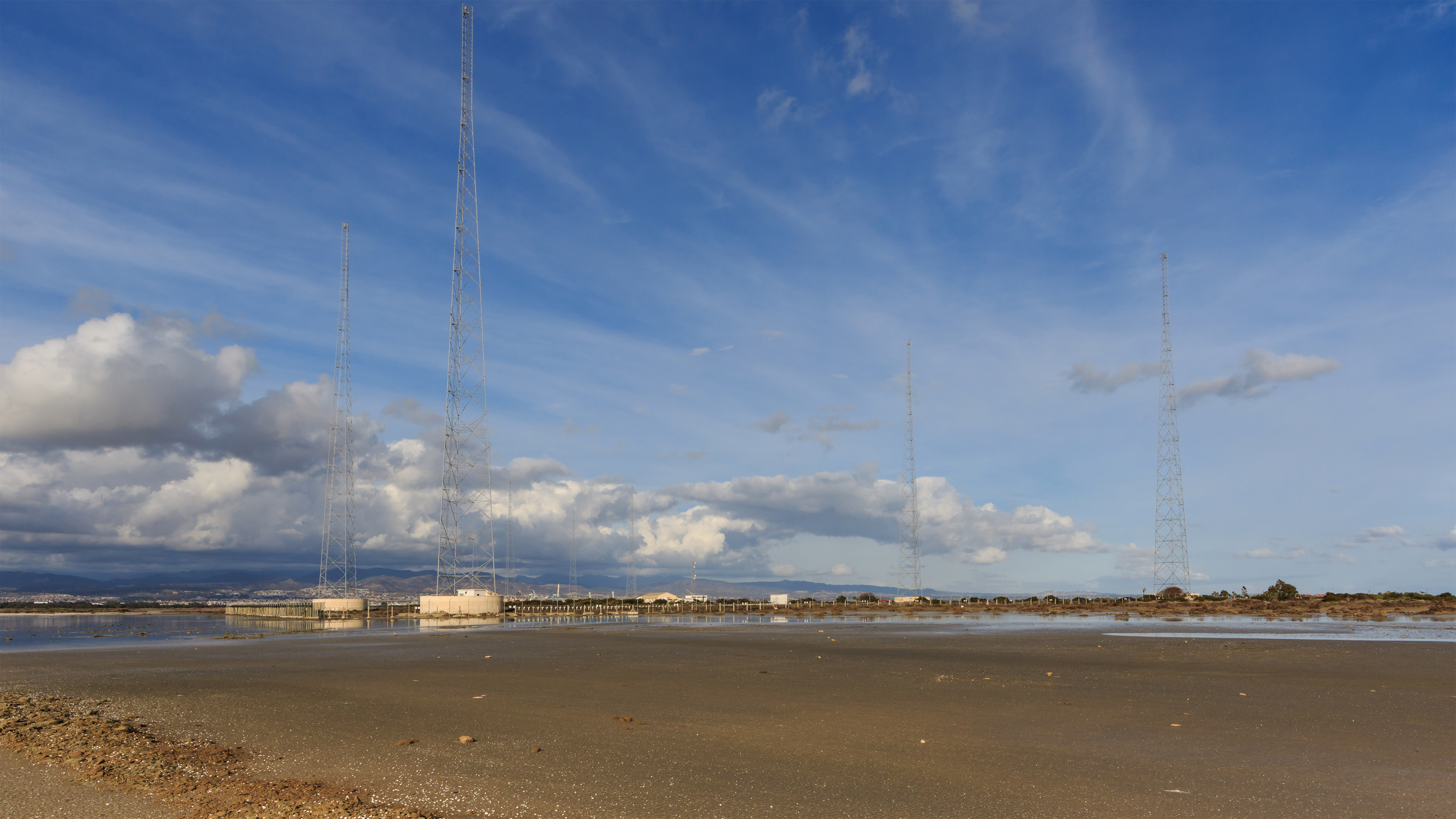
- BBC World Service transmitter masts near Akrotiri

- Location of BEMRS transmitters in Cyprus
- Location: Akrotiri Sovereign Base Area
- Tower height: 120 m (390 ft)
- Coordinates: 34.6192°N 33.0014°E

The British East Mediterranean Relay Station (BEMRS) was one of the most powerful broadcasting stations in Cyprus. The medium wave transmitters were situated south of Limassol west of Lady's Mile Beach on the area of Western Sovereign Base Area and used for relaying radio programmes to the Middle East area on 639 kHz and 720 kHz with 500 kW.

== Background ==
The short-wave transmitters were located at Zygi 34.7217°N 33.3241°E.

The station was used for broadcasting BBC World Service programmes from 1957 until April 2015 when transmissions ended. Previously an Arabic-language station (Near East Broadcasting Station), it was taken over by the Diplomatic Wireless Service as a result of the Suez Crisis.

On 1 November 2023, the station was reactivated on 639 kHz by the BBC to provide coverage to the Gaza Strip.

On 17 December 2024, the BBC announced they would resume broadcasting on 639 kHz and 720 kHz to Syria

== Antenna systems ==
The medium-wave station had two directional antenna systems each consisting of four free-standing lattice towers with triangular cross section. All the towers were insulated from ground. The antenna system for 720 kHz, which was situated north of the transmitter building, pointed to an azimuth of 110 degrees. Its towers were 102 metres (335 ft) metres tall. The antenna system for 639 kHz, which was situated south of the transmitter building, pointed in a southerly direction (azimuth 180 degrees). Its towers were 120 metres (390 ft) tall.
