= BBC World Service =

International radio division of the BBC

- Logo used since 2022
- Type: Radio broadcasting: news, speech, discussions, public broadcaster
- Country: United Kingdom
- Availability: Worldwide
- Headquarters: Broadcasting House, London
- Broadcast area: Worldwide
- Owner: BBC
- Key people: Jonathan Munro
- Launch date: 19 December 1932; 93 years ago
- Former names: BBC Empire Service; BBC Overseas Service; External Services of the BBC
- Webcast: Web stream
- Official website: www.bbcworldservice.com

The BBC World Service is a British public service broadcaster owned and operated by the BBC. It is the world's largest external broadcaster in terms of reception area, language selection and audience reach. It broadcasts radio news, speech and discussions in more than 40 languages to many parts of the world on analogue and digital shortwave platforms, internet streaming, podcasting, satellite, DAB, FM, LW and MW relays. In 2024, the World Service reached an average of 450 million people a week (via TV, radio and online).

BBC World Service English maintains eight regional feeds with several programme variations, covering, respectively, East and Southern Africa; West and Central Africa; Europe and Middle East; the Americas and Caribbean; East Asia; South Asia; Australasia; and the United Kingdom. There are also two online-only streams, a general one and the other more news-orientated, known as News Internet. The service broadcasts 24 hours a day.

The World Service states that its aim is to be "the world's best-known and most-respected voice in international broadcasting", and its operating agreement states that it retains a "balanced British view" of international developments. Former director Peter Horrocks visualised the organisation as fighting an "information war" of soft power against Russian and Chinese international state media, including RT. As such, the BBC has been banned in both Russia and China, the former following its 2022 invasion of Ukraine.

The director of the BBC World Service is Jonathan Munro. The controller of the BBC World Service in English is Jon Zilkha.

== History ==
=== Early years ===
The BBC World Service began on 19 December 1932 (emitted from the Daventry transmitting station) as the Empire Short Wave Service, broadcasting on shortwave and aimed principally at English speakers across the British Empire. In his first Christmas Message (1932), King George V characterised the service as intended for "men and women, so cut off by the snow, the desert, or the sea, that only voices out of the air can reach them". First hopes for the Empire Service were low. The Director-General, Sir John Reith, said in the opening programme:

Don't expect too much in the early days; for some time we shall transmit comparatively simple programmes, to give the best chance of intelligible reception and provide evidence as to the type of material most suitable for the service in each zone. The programmes will neither be very interesting nor very good.

This address was read out five times as the BBC broadcast it live to different parts of the world.

=== World War II ===
The BBC would continue to claim independence from the Government during the war, but as Asa Briggs noted, a complete picture of the wartime BBC would have to include 'persistent references' to the various connected agencies of the government. Chiefly, the Political Warfare Executive, responsible for all broadcasts to Europe.

On 3 January 1938, the first foreign-language service was launched—in Arabic. Programmes in German, Italian and French began broadcasting on 27 September 1938 projecting the British quest for peace in the days prior to the conference on the Munich Agreement.

By the end of 1942, the BBC had started broadcasts in all major European languages. The Empire Service was renamed the BBC Overseas Service in November 1939, supplemented by the addition of a dedicated BBC European Service from 1941. Funding for these services—known administratively as the External Services of the BBC—came not from the domestic licence fee but from government grant-in-aid (from the Foreign Office budget).

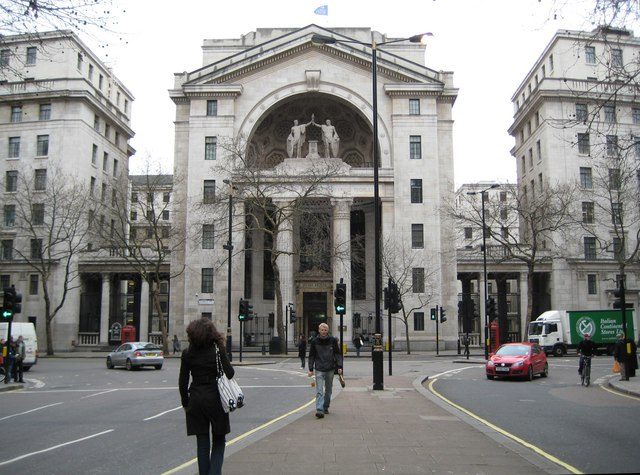
Bush House in London was home to the World Service between 1941 and 2012.

The External Services broadcast propaganda during the Second World War, on the German-language service Londoner Rundfunk especially against Nazi rule, believed in the early days of the war at least to have weak support. Its French service Radio Londres also sent coded messages to the French Resistance. George Orwell broadcast many news bulletins on the Eastern Service during the Second World War. The Belgian government in exile broadcast from Radio Belgique.

=== Cold War ===
The 1956 Hungarian uprising held enormous implications for international radio broadcasting as it related to western foreign policy during the Cold War. Western broadcasts (especially the US's RFE) incited an expectation of support that had already been decided against by President Eisenhower. The BBC, unlike other broadcasters, did not lose credibility in the crisis. It showed sensitivity and acted as its own censor when diplomacy may have been jeopardised otherwise.

In stark contrast stood the BBC's reporting on the Suez Crisis of the same year. Although the British government tried to censor the BBC, it continued its even-handed reporting to both home as well as all foreign audiences. The row had the government seriously consider taking over the service when then prime minister Anthony Eden wanted to ensure that only the government line—that the British and French only invaded Egypt to keep peace and because its president Nasser was breaking international law—would reach the home (and international) audience.

The failure of the UK in the Suez Crisis pushed the British government to expand the relay network of the BBC External Service, with the hope that it would enable the British government to counter other influential voices (such as Nasser) and promote the British government's perspective.

By the end of the 1940s, the number of broadcast languages had expanded and reception had improved, following the opening of a relay in Malaya and of the Limassol relay in Cyprus in 1957.

Also in 1957, a number of foreign language services were discontinued, or reduced.

In 1962, the Foreign Office argued that the VOA's philosophy, as presented to it by its then director Henry Loomis, not to broadcast to fully-developed allied countries in their respective languages should be adopted by the BBC. The reluctance of the BBC to drop those services was predicted also.

On 1 May 1965, the service took its current name of BBC World Service. It expanded its reach with the opening of the Ascension Island relay in 1966, serving African audiences with a stronger signal and better reception, and with the later relay on the Island of Masirah in Oman.

In August 1985, the service went off-air for the first time when workers went on strike in protest at the British government's decision to ban a documentary featuring an interview with Martin McGuinness of Sinn Féin.

Subsequently, financial pressures decreased the number and the types of services offered by the BBC. Audiences in countries with wide access to Internet services have less need for terrestrial radio. Broadcasts in German ended in March 1999, after research showed that the majority of German listeners tuned into the English-language service. Broadcasts in Dutch, Finnish, French, Hebrew, Italian, Japanese and Malay stopped for similar reasons.

=== Twenty-first century ===
BBC World Service logo used from 2008 to 2019

BBC World Service logo used from 2019 to 2022

On 25 October 2005, the BBC announced that broadcasts in Bulgarian, Croatian, Czech, Greek, Hungarian, Kazakh, Polish, Slovak, Slovene and Thai would end by March 2006, to finance the launch in 2007 of television news services in Arabic and Persian. Additionally, Romanian broadcasts ceased on 1 August 2008.

In 2007, the last FM broadcast of BBC News Russian was discontinued at the order of the Russian government. Finam owned Bolshoye Radio, the last of three services to drop the BBC Russia broadcasts. A spokesman for the organisation claimed that 'any media which is government-financed is propaganda – it's a fact, it's not negative'. Reports put the development in the context of criticism of the Russian government for curbing media freedom ahead of the 2008 Russian presidential election. Reporters Without Borders condemned the move as censorship.

In 2011, BBC Kyrgyz service newsreader and producer Arslan Koichiev resigned from his BBC post after revelations and claims of involvement in the Kyrgyzstan revolution of April 2010. He had been based in London, but often travelled to Kyrgyzstan and used BBC resources to agitate against President Kurmanbek Bakiyev, appearing on a Kyrgyz radio station under a pseudonym with a disguised voice. One of the leaders of the revolution, Aliyasbek Alymkulov, named the producer as his mentor and claimed that they had discussed preparations for the revolution. According to London newspaper the Evening Standard, "Mr Alymkulov claimed that Koichiev arranged secret meetings "through the BBC" and organised the march at the presidential palace on 7 April 2010"

In October 2010, the UK government announced that it was reducing the service's revenue funding by 16% and its capital funding by 52% by 2017. This necessitated over 650 staff leaving. Funding from the Foreign & Commonwealth Office would end in April 2014, when funding would mainly be from the television licence fee. From 2010, the service started transforming from a mainly radio-based operation to multi-media.

In January 2011, the closure of the Albanian, Macedonian, and Serbian, as well as English for the Caribbean and Portuguese for Africa, services was announced. The British government announced that the three Balkan countries had wide access to international information, and so broadcasts in the local languages had become unnecessary. This decision reflected the financial situation the Corporation faced following transfer of responsibility for the Service from the Foreign Office, so that it would in future have been funded from within licence-fee income. The Russian, Ukrainian, Mandarin Chinese, Turkish, Vietnamese and Spanish for Cuba services ceased radio broadcasting, and the Hindi, Indonesian, Kyrgyz, Nepali, Swahili, Kinyarwanda and Kirundi services ceased shortwave transmissions. As part of the 16% budget cut, 650 jobs were eliminated.

In 2012, London staff moved from Bush House to Broadcasting House, so co-located with other BBC News departments. About 35% of its 1,518 full-time equivalent staff in 2014 were based overseas at 115 locations. From 2014 the service became part of World Service Group under the Director of BBC News and Current Affairs.

From 2016, 1,100 additional staff were recruited as part of an expansion of the World Service, about a 70% increase, funded by the Foreign, Commonwealth & Development Office providing £254 million/year for five years, partly a reversal of the government decision that the television licence fee would fund the service from 2014. This was the biggest service expansion since World War II.

In 2022, a new London-based China unit was in development, described by the government as "focused on exposing the challenges and realities currently facing China and its fight for global influence".

== Operation ==
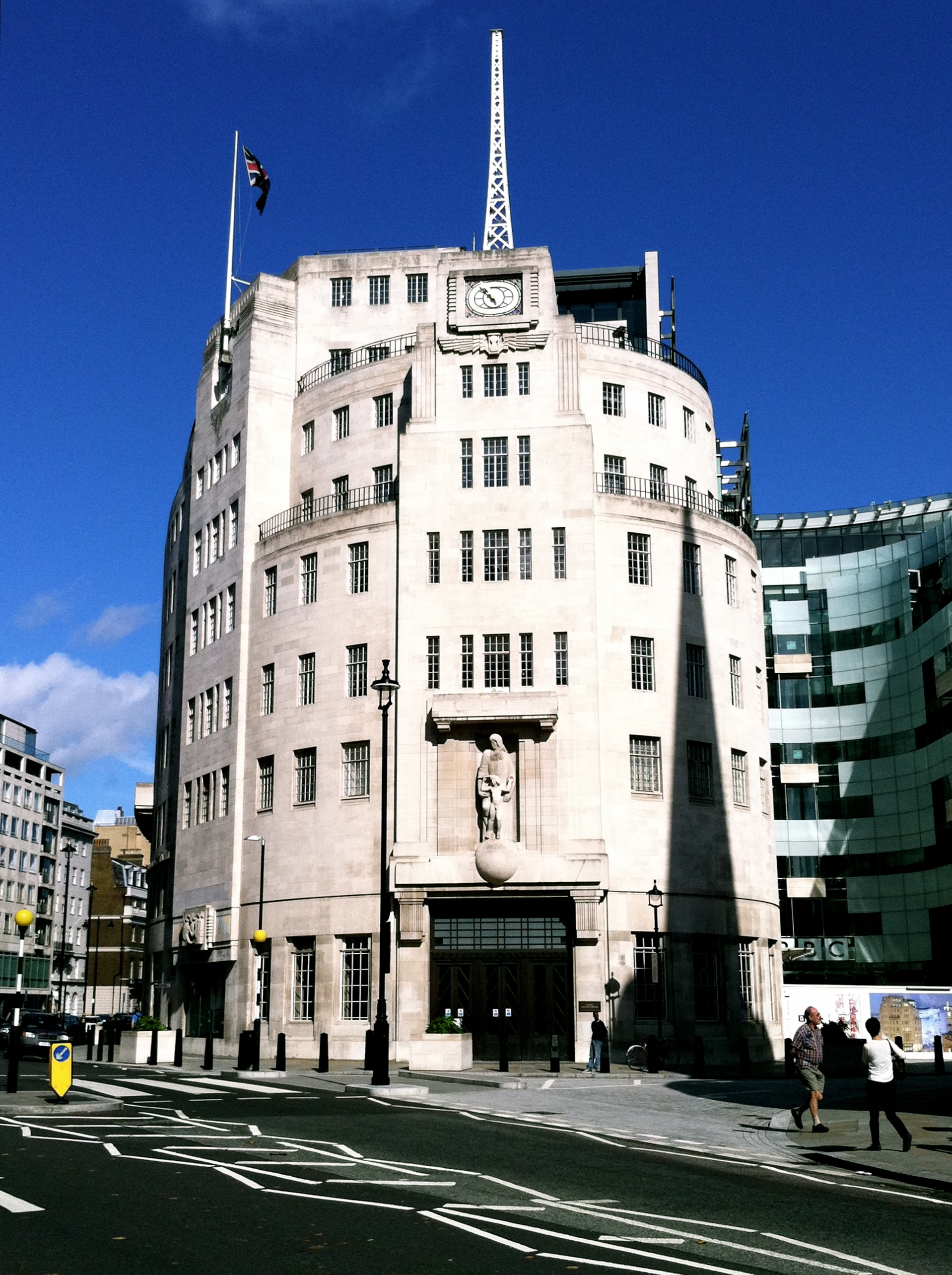
The BBC World Service is located in Broadcasting House, London.

The Service broadcasts from Broadcasting House in London, which is also headquarters of the corporation. It is located in the newer parts of the building, which contains radio and television studios for use by the overseas language services. The building also contains an integrated newsroom used by the international World Service, the international television channel BBC World News, the domestic television and radio BBC News bulletins, the BBC News Channel and BBC Online.

At its launch, the Service was located along with most radio output in Broadcasting House. However, following the explosion of a parachute mine nearby on 8 December 1940, it relocated to premises away from the likely target of Broadcasting House. The Overseas service relocated to Oxford Street while the European service moved temporarily to the emergency broadcasting facilities at Maida Vale Studios. The European services moved permanently into Bush House towards the end of 1940, completing the move in 1941, with the Overseas services joining them in 1958. Bush House subsequently became the home of the BBC World Service and the building itself has gained a global reputation with the audience of the service. However, the building was vacated in 2012 as a result of the Broadcasting House redevelopment and the end of the building's lease that year; the first service to move was the Burmese Service on 11 March 2012 and the final broadcast from Bush House was a news bulletin broadcast at 11:00 GMT on 12 July 2012.

The BBC World Service encompasses an English 24-hour global radio network and separate services in 27 other languages. News and information is available in these languages on the BBC website, with many having RSS feeds and specific versions for use on mobile devices, and some also offer email notification of stories. In addition to the English service, 18 of the language services broadcast a radio service using the short wave, AM or FM bands. These are also available to listen live or can be listened to later (usually for seven days) over the Internet and, in the case of seven language services, can be downloaded as podcasts. News is also available from the BBC News 'app', which is available from both iTunes and the Google Play Store. In recent years, video content has also been used by the World Service: 16 language services show video reports on the website, and the Arabic and Persian services have their own television channels. TV is also used to broadcast the radio service, with local cable and satellite operators providing the English network (and occasionally some local language services) free to air. The English service is also available on digital radio in the UK and Europe.

Traditionally, the Service relied on shortwave broadcasts, because of their ability to overcome barriers of censorship, distance, and spectrum scarcity. The BBC has maintained a worldwide network of shortwave relay stations since the 1940s, mainly in former British colonies. These cross-border broadcasts have also been used in special circumstances for emergency messages to British subjects abroad, such as the advice to evacuate Jordan during the Black September incidents of September 1970. These facilities were privatised in 1997 as Merlin Communications, and later acquired and operated as part of a wider network for multiple broadcasters by VT Communications (now part of Babcock International Group). It is also common for BBC programmes to air on Voice of America or ORF transmitters, while their programming is relayed by a station located inside the UK. However, since the 1980s, satellite distribution has made it possible for local stations to relay BBC programmes.

BBC World Service is not regulated by Ofcom as the BBC generally is. Instead, the BBC is responsible for editorial independence and setting strategic direction. It defines the remit, scope, annual budget and main commitments of the World Service, and agrees "objectives, targets and priorities" with the British Foreign Secretary in a document named the BBC World Service Licence. The Chair of the BBC Board and the Foreign Secretary (or representatives) meet at least annually to review performance against these objectives, priorities and targets.

== Funding ==
The World Service was funded for decades by grant-in-aid through the Foreign and Commonwealth Office until 1 April 2014. Since then it has been funded by a mixture of the United Kingdom's television licence fee, limited advertising, profits of BBC Studios, and Foreign, Commonwealth and Development Office (FCDO) funding.

From 2014, the service was guaranteed £289 million (allocated over a five-year period ending in 2020) from the UK government. In 2016, the government announced that the licence fee funding for the World Service would be £254 million/year for the five years from 2017. From 2016 to 2022, the FCDO contributed over £470 million to the World Service via its World 2020 Programme, about 80% of which is categorised as Overseas Development Assistance, amounting to about a quarter of the World Service budget. In November 2022, the government confirmed the continuing involvement of the FCDO in funding the World Service.

In 2025, the FCDO asked the BBC to draw up World Service budget cut options as input to the forthcoming spending review. In response, the government's new soft power council warned of the impact on British soft power around the world. Of the World Service's existing government funding, 80% was designated as official development assistance, which the government intended to cut by nearly half to increase defence spending. The BBC sought funding from the UK defence budget for the World Service, for example to cover media monitoring and anti-disinformation as contributing to British security activities. Ultimately, the government concluded the rise of global disinformation required countering, and the FCDO increased its funding by 8% for a three year period which was expected to be roughly the same as inflation, so in real terms no significant change.

== Languages ==
This table lists the various language services operated by the BBC World Service with start and closure dates, where known/applicable.

=== Current services ===
Language	Start date	Close date	Website/notes	Radio	TV	Online
Afaan Oromoo	18 September 2017		BBC Afaan Oromoo	Yes		Yes
Amharic	18 September 2017		BBC Amharic	Yes		Yes
Arabic	3 January 1938	27 January 2023 (radio service)	BBC Arabic	No	Yes	Yes
Azerbaijani	30 November 1994		BBC Azeri	Yes		Yes
Bengali	11 October 1941		BBC Bangla	No		Yes
Burmese	2 September 1940		BBC Burmese	Yes		Yes
Cantonese Chinese	5 May 1941		BBC Chinese			Yes
Mandarin Chinese	19 May 1941		BBC Chinese			Yes
English	25 December 1936		BBC World Service	Yes	Yes	Yes
French for Africa	20 June 1960		BBC French	Yes		Yes
Gujarati	1 March 1942; 2 October 2017	3 September 1944	BBC Gujarati			Yes
Hausa	13 March 1957		BBC Hausa	Yes		Yes
Hindi	11 May 1940		BBC Hindi	No	Yes	Yes
Hungarian	5 September 1939; 16 June 2026 (relaunch)	31 December 2005	BBC Hungarian; BBC Hungarian Archive	No	No	Yes
Igbo	19 February 2018		BBC Igbo			Yes
Indonesian	30 October 1949		BBC Indonesian	No		Yes
Japanese	4 July 1943; 17 October 2015 (relaunch)	31 March 1991	BBC Japanese	Yes	Yes	Yes
Kinyarwanda and Kirundi	8 September 1994		BBC Gahuza	Yes		Yes
Korean	26 September 2017		BBC Korean	Yes		Yes
Kyrgyz	1 April 1995		BBC Kyrgyz	No		Yes
Marathi	1 March 1942; 31 December 1944; 2 October 2017	3 September 1944; 25 December 1958	BBC Marathi			Yes
Nepali	7 June 1969		BBC Nepali	Yes		Yes
Nigerian Pidgin	21 August 2017		BBC Pidgin	Yes		Yes
Pashto	15 August 1981		BBC Pashto	Yes		Yes
Persian	28 December 1940		BBC Persian	Yes	Yes	Yes
Polish	7 September 1939; 24 June 2025 (relaunch)	23 December 2005	BBC Polska	No	No	Yes
Portuguese for Brazil	14 March 1938		BBC Brasil	Yes		Yes
Punjabi	2 October 2017		BBC Punjabi	Yes	Yes	Yes
Russian	7 October 1942; 24 March 1946		BBC Russian		Yes	Yes
Serbian	29 September 1991; 26 March 2018	25 February 2011	BBC Serbian	Yes		Yes
Sinhala	10 March 1942; 11 March 1990		BBC Sinhala	No		Yes
Somali	18 July 1957		BBC Somali	Yes		Yes
Spanish for Latin America	14 March 1938		BBC Mundo			Yes
Swahili	27 June 1957		BBC Swahili	Yes		Yes
Tamil	3 May 1941		BBC Tamil	No		Yes
Telugu	2 October 2017		BBC Telugu			Yes
Thai	27 April 1941; 3 June 1962 (1st relaunch); 10 July 2014 (2nd relaunch); 16 November 2016 (3rd relaunch)	5 March 1960; 13 January 2006	BBC Thai Facebook page BBC Thai	Yes		Yes
Tigrinya	18 September 2017		BBC Tigrinya	Yes		Yes
Turkish	20 November 1939		BBC Turkish	Yes		Yes
Ukrainian	1 June 1992		BBC Ukrainian	Yes		Yes
Urdu	3 April 1949		BBC Urdu	No		Yes
Uzbek	30 November 1994		BBC Uzbek	No		Yes
Vietnamese	6 February 1952	26 March 2011 (radio service)	BBC Vietnamese	No		Yes
Yoruba	19 February 2018		BBC Yoruba			Yes

=== Former services ===
Language	Start date	Close date	Website/notes	Radio	TV	Online
Afrikaans	14 May 1939	8 September 1957		Yes		
Albanian	12 November 1940; 20 February 1993	20 January 1967; 28 February 2011	BBC Albanian Archive	Yes		
Belgian French and Belgian Dutch	28 September 1940	30 March 1952		Yes		
Bulgarian	7 February 1940	23 December 2005	BBC Bulgarian Archive	Yes		Yes
Croatian	29 September 1991	31 January 2006	BBC Croatian Archive	Yes		Yes
Hokkien Chinese	1 October 1942	7 February 1948				
Czech	31 December 1939	28 February 2006	BBC Czech Archive	Yes		Yes
Danish	9 April 1940	10 August 1957		Yes		
Dutch	11 April 1940	10 August 1957		Yes		
Dutch for Indonesia	28 August 1944; 25 May 1946	2 April 1945; 13 May 1951		Yes		
English for the Caribbean	25 December 1976	25 March 2011	BBC Caribbean Archive	Yes		Yes
Finnish	18 March 1940	31 December 1997	BBC Finnish archived	Yes		
French for Canada	2 November 1942	8 May 1980		Yes		
French for Europe	27 September 1938	31 March 1995		Yes		
French for South-East Asia	28 August 1944	3 April 1955		Yes		
German	27 September 1938	26 March 1999	BBC German archived	Yes		
German for Austria	29 March 1943	15 September 1957		Yes		
Greek	30 September 1939	31 December 2005	BBC Greek Archive	Yes		Yes
Greek for Cyprus	16 September 1940	3 June 1951		Yes		
Hebrew	30 October 1949	28 October 1968		Yes		
Icelandic	1 December 1940	26 June 1944		Yes		
Italian	27 September 1938	31 December 1981		Yes		
Kazakh	1 April 1995	16 December 2005	BBC Kazakh Archive	Yes		Yes
Luxembourgish	29 May 1943	30 May 1952		Yes		
Macedonian	6 January 1996	4 March 2011	BBC Macedonian Archive	Yes		
Malay	2 May 1941	31 March 1991		Yes		
Maltese	10 August 1940	31 December 1981		Yes		
Norwegian	9 April 1940	10 August 1957		Yes		
Portuguese for Africa	4 June 1939	25 February 2011	BBC Portuguese for Africa Archive	Yes		Yes
Portuguese for Europe	4 June 1939	10 August 1957		Yes		
Romanian	15 September 1939	1 August 2008	BBC Romanian Archive	Yes		Yes
Slovak	31 December 1941	31 December 2005	BBC Slovak Archive	Yes		Yes
Slovene	22 April 1941	23 December 2005	BBC Slovene Archive	Yes		Yes
Swedish	12 February 1940	4 March 1961		Yes		
Welsh for Patagonia, Argentina	1945	1946		Yes		
Yugoslav (Serbo-Croatian)	15 September 1939	28 September 1991		Yes		

== Radio programming in English ==
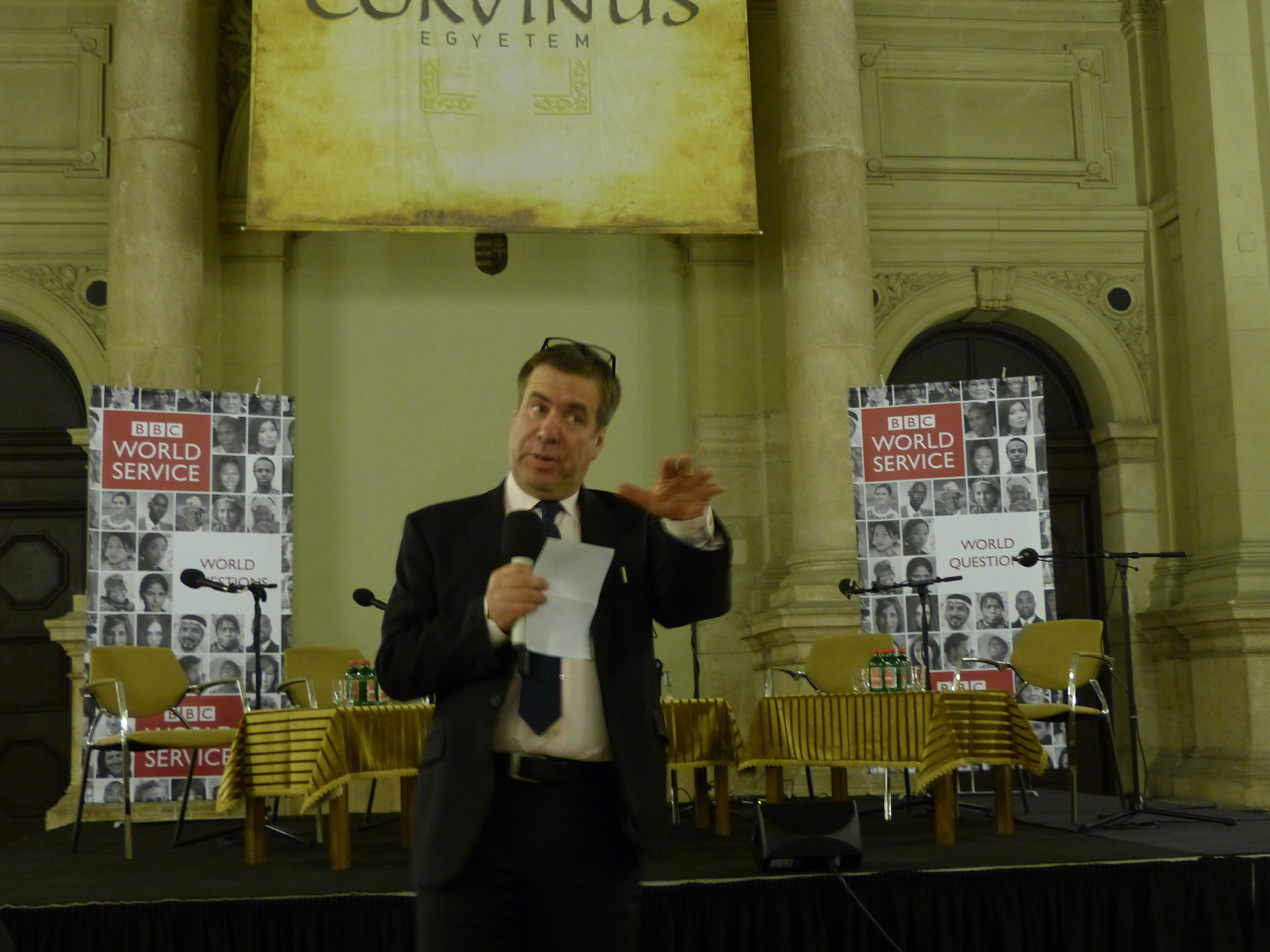
Steve Titherington - BBC World Questions broadcasting from Budapest

The World Service in English mainly broadcasts news and analysis. The mainstays of the current schedule are Newsday, Newshour and The Newsroom. Daily science programmes include: Health Check, and Science in Action. Sportsworld, which often includes live commentary of Premier League football matches is broadcast at weekends. Other weekend sport shows include The Sports Hour and Stumped, a cricket programme co-produced with All India Radio and the Australian Broadcasting Corporation. On Sundays, the discussion programme The Forum is broadcast. Outlook is a human interest programme which was first broadcast in July 1966 and presented for more than thirty years by John Tidmarsh. Trending describes itself as "explaining the stories the world is sharing..." Regular music programmes were reintroduced with the autumn schedule in 2015. Many programmes, particularly speech-based ones, are also available as podcasts. Business Daily is a weekday live international business news programme, which broadcasts from 08:32 to 08:59 GMT from Broadcasting House in London.

== Previous radio programming in English ==
Previous broadcasts included popular music programmes presented by John Peel and classical music programmes presented by Edward Greenfield. There have also been religious programmes, of mostly Anglican celebration and often from the Church of St. Martin in the Fields, weekly drama, English-language lessons, and comedy including Just A Minute. Other notable previous programmes include Letter from America by Alistair Cooke, which was broadcast for over fifty years; Off the Shelf with its daily reading from a novel, biography or history book; A Jolly Good Show, a music request programme presented by Dave Lee Travis; Waveguide, a radio reception guide; and The Merchant Navy Programme, a show for seafarers presented by Malcolm Billings; The Morning Show, Good Morning Africa and PM, all presented by Pete Myers in the 1960s and 1970s.

Since the late 1990s, the station has focused more on news, with bulletins added every half-hour following the outbreak of the Iraq War.

=== News ===
News is at the core of the scheduling. A five-minute bulletin is generally transmitted at 01 past the hour, with a two-minute summary at 30 past the hour. Sometimes these are separate from other programming, or alternatively made integral to the programme (such as with The Newsroom, Newshour or Newsday). In October 2024, it was announced that the bulletins would be broadcast on domestic BBC radio stations during the night. During such time slots as weeknights 23:00–00:00 GMT and that of Sportsworld, no news summaries are broadcast. As part of the BBC's policy for breaking news, the Service is the first to receive a full report for foreign news.

== Availability ==
=== Americas ===
BBC World Service is available by subscription to Sirius XM's satellite radio service in the United States. Its Canadian affiliate, SiriusXM Canada, does the same in Canada. More than 300 public radio stations across the US carry World Service news broadcasts – mostly during the overnight and early-morning hours – over AM and FM radio, distributed by American Public Media (APM). Some public radio stations also carry the World Service in its entirety via HD Radio. The BBC and Public Radio International (PRI) (then later Public Radio Exchange (PRX) after it merged with PRI in 2018) co-produce the programme The World with WGBH Radio Boston, and the BBC was previously involved with The Takeaway morning news programme based at WNYC in New York City. BBC World Service programming also airs as part of CBC Radio One's CBC Radio Overnight schedule in Canada.

BBC shortwave broadcasts to this region were traditionally enhanced by the Atlantic Relay Station and the Caribbean Relay Company, a station in Antigua run jointly with Deutsche Welle. In addition, an exchange agreement with Radio Canada International gave access to their station in New Brunswick. However, "changing listening habits" led the World Service to end shortwave radio transmission directed to North America and Australasia on 1 July 2001. A shortwave listener coalition formed to oppose the change.

The BBC broadcasts to Central America and South America in several languages. It is possible to receive the Western African shortwave radio broadcasts from eastern North America, but the BBC does not guarantee reception in this area. It has ended its specialist programming to the Falkland Islands but continues to provide a stream of World Service programming to the Falkland Islands Radio Service.

=== Asia ===
For several decades, the World Service's largest audiences have been in Asia, the Middle East, Near East and South Asia. Transmission facilities in the UK and Cyprus were supplemented by the former BBC Eastern Relay Station in Oman and the Far Eastern Relay Station in Singapore, formerly in Malaysia. The East Asian Relay Station moved to Thailand in 1997 when Hong Kong was handed over to Chinese sovereignty. The relay station in Thailand was closed during January 2017, and in Singapore during July 2023; currently, a relay station in Masirah, Oman serves the Asian region. Together, these facilities have given the BBC World Service an easily accessible signal in regions where shortwave listening has traditionally been popular. The English shortwave frequencies of 6.195 (49-m band), 9.74 (31-m band), 15.31/15.36 (19-m band) and 17.76/17.79 (16-m band) were widely known. On 25 March 2018, the long-established shortwave frequency of 9.74 MHz was changed to 9.9 MHz.

The largest audiences are in English, Hindi, Urdu, Nepali, Bengali, Sinhala, Tamil, Marathi and other major languages of South Asia, where BBC broadcasters are household names. The Persian service is the de facto national broadcaster of Afghanistan, along with its Iranian audience. The World Service is available up to 18 hours a day in English across most parts of Asia, and in Arabic for the Middle East. With the addition of relays in Afghanistan and Iraq these services are accessible in most of the Middle and Near East in the evening. In Singapore, the BBC World Service in English has been carried on FM alongside domestic stations since 1976, via a relay operated by the country's state-owned broadcaster Mediacorp. For many years Radio Television Hong Kong broadcast BBC World Service 24/7 but as of 12 February 2021, Hong Kong has banned the BBC's World Service radio from its airwaves, following swiftly on the heels of China's decision to bar its World News television channels, seemingly in retaliation for Ofcom revoking the UK broadcasting licence of China Global Television Network. In the Philippines, DZRJ 810 AM and its FM sister station RJFM 100.3 broadcasts the BBC World Service in English from 06:00 to 20:00 PHT from Mondays to Saturdays.

Although this region has seen the launch of the only two foreign language television channels, several other services have had their radio services closed as a result of budget cuts and redirection of resources.

Japan and Korea have little tradition of World Service listening, although during the Second World War and in the 1970s to 1980s, shortwave listening was popular in Japan. In those two countries, the BBC World Service was only available via shortwave and the Internet. As of September 2007, a satellite transmission (subscription required) became available by Skylife (Channel 791) in South Korea. In November 2016, the BBC World Service announced it plans to start broadcasts in Korean. BBC Korean, a radio and web service, started on 25 September 2017.

On 13 October 2026, the Taliban announced that it had suspended the broadcast of World Service's Pashto, Dari and English-language radio broadcasts in Afghanistan.

==== Jamming ====
The Soviet Union, Iran, Iraq and Myanmar/Burma have all jammed the BBC in the past. Mandarin was heavily jammed by the People's Republic of China until shortwave transmissions for that service ceased but China continues to jam transmissions in Uzbek and has since started to jam transmissions in English throughout Asia.

=== Europe ===
The BBC World Service is broadcast in Berlin on 94.8 MHz. FM relays are also available in České Budějovice, Karlovy Vary, Plzeň, Ústí nad Labem, Zlín and Prague in the Czech Republic, Pristina, Riga, Tallinn, Tirana and Vilnius. The station is also available in Reykjavík, Iceland on 94.5 MHz FM. A BBC World Service channel is available on DAB+ in Brussels and Flanders and Amsterdam, the Hague, Utrecht and Rotterdam. Following a national reorganisation of DAB multiplexes in October 2017, the station is available on DAB+ across the whole of Denmark.

The World Service employed a medium wave transmitter at Orford Ness to provide English-language coverage to Europe, including on the frequency 648 kHz (which could be heard in parts of the south-east of England during the day and most of the UK after dark). Transmissions on this frequency were stopped on 27 March 2011, as a consequence of the budgetary constraints imposed on the BBC World Service in the 2010 budget review. A second channel (1296 kHz) traditionally broadcast in various Central European languages, but this frequency has also been discontinued and in 2005 it began regular English-language transmissions via the Digital Radio Mondiale (DRM) format. This is a digital shortwave technology that VT expects to become the standard for cross-border transmissions in developed countries.

In the 1990s, the BBC purchased and constructed large medium wave and FM networks in the former Soviet bloc, particularly the Czech (BBC Czech Section), Slovak Republics (BBC Slovak Section), Poland (BBC Polish Section) (where it was a national network) and Russia (BBC Russian Service). It had built up a strong audience during the Cold War, whilst economic restructuring made it difficult for these governments to refuse Western investment. Many of these facilities have now returned to domestic control, as economic and political conditions have changed.

On Monday, 18 February 2008, the BBC World Service stopped analogue shortwave transmissions to Europe. The notice stated, "Increasing numbers of people around the world are choosing to listen to radio on a range of other platforms including FM, satellite and online, with fewer listening on shortwave." It is sometimes possible to pick up the BBC World Service in Europe on SW frequencies targeted at North Africa.

In Malta, BBC News bulletins are carried by a number of radio stations, including Radju Malta and Magic 91.7, owned by national broadcaster PBS Ltd. These are broadcast at various points in the day and supplement news bulletins broadcast in Maltese from the PBS Newsroom.

Former BBC shortwave transmitters are located in the United Kingdom at Rampisham Down in Dorset, Woofferton in Shropshire and Skelton in Cumbria. The former BBC East Mediterranean Relay Station is in Cyprus.

In response to the 2022 Russian invasion of Ukraine, the BBC began broadcasting World Service English programming at shortwave frequencies 15.735 MHz and 5875 kHz for receivers in Ukraine and parts of Russia.

=== Pacific ===
The World Service is available as part of the subscription Digital Air package (available from Foxtel and Austar) in Australia. ABC NewsRadio, SBS Radio, and various community radio stations also broadcast many programmes. Many of these stations broadcast a straight feed during the midnight to dawn period. It was also available via the satellite service Optus Aurora, which is encrypted but available without subscription. In Sydney, Australia, a transmission of the service can be received at 152.025 MHz. It is also available on the DAB+ Network in Australia on SBS Radio 4 (except during Eurovision and special events). 2MBS-FM 102.5, a classical music station in Sydney, also carries the BBC World Service news programmes at 07:00 and 08:00 on weekdays, during its Music for a New Day breakfast programme.

Shortwave relays from Singapore (see Asia, above) continue, but historic relays via Australian Broadcasting Corporation (ABC) and Radio New Zealand International were wound down in the late 1990s. BBC World Service relays on Radio Australia now carry the BBC Radio news programmes.

In the Pacific and New Zealand, the Auckland Radio Trust operates a BBC World Service network as a non-profit donation-funded public broadcaster. It broadcasts on 810 kHz in Auckland, 107.0 MHz in Whitianga and Whangamatā, 107.3 MHz in Kaipara Harbour, 88.2 MHz in Suva and Nadi, 100.0 MHz in Bairiki and Tarawa, 101.1 MHz in Pohnpei, 107.6 MHz in Port Moresby, 105.9 MHz in Honiara, 99.0 MHz in Port Vila and Luganville, and 100.1 MHz in Funafuti. The station also broadcasts local content.

In New Zealand, AREC FM carries the BBC World Service 24/7 in the Wellington region. Available on 107.0 MHz in the CBD, 87.6 MHz in Porirua/Mana, and 87.9 MHz in Waikanae/Paraparaumu. AREC FM is a non-profit donation funded LPFM broadcaster and a subscriber to the Community Broadcasting Association of Australia's Community Radio Network (Australia).

In New Zealand, Radio Tarana and members of the Association of Community Access Broadcasters carry some BBC World Service programmes. The BBC World Service was previously available on 1233 kHz in Wellington between 1990 and 1994, and again from 1996 to 1997.

=== UK ===
The BBC World Service is broadcast on DAB, Freeview, Virgin Media and Sky platforms, as well as on BBC Sounds. It is also broadcast overnight on the frequencies of BBC Radio 4 and the Welsh language service BBC Radio Cymru following their closedown at 00:00 or 01:00 British time. The BBC World Service does not receive funding for broadcasts to the UK. In southeast England, the station could be picked up reliably on medium wave 648 kHz, which was targeted at mainland Europe.

According to RAJAR, the station broadcasts to a weekly audience of 1.2 million with a listening share of 0.7% as of March 2024.

== Presentation ==
=== Opening tune ===
A previous BBC World Service signature tune and an example of a top-of-the-hour announcement

The World Service uses several tunes and sounds to represent the station. A previous signature tune of the station was a five note motif, composed by David Arnold and which comprises a variety of voices declaim "This is the BBC in..." before going on to name various cities (e.g. Kampala, Milan, Delhi, Johannesburg), followed by the station's slogan and the Greenwich Time Signal. This was heard throughout the network with a few variations – in the UK the full service name was spoken, whereas just the name of the BBC was used outside the UK. The phrase "This is London" was used previously in place of a station slogan.

The tune "Lillibullero" was another well known signature tune of the network following its broadcast previously as part of the top-of-the-hour sequence. This piece of music is no longer heard before news bulletins. The use of the tune gained minor controversy because of its background as a Protestant marching song in Northern Ireland.

The Prince of Denmark's March (commonly known as the Trumpet Voluntary) was often broadcast by the BBC Radio during World War II, especially when programming was directed to occupied Denmark, as the march symbolised a connection between the two countries. It remained for many years the signature tune of the BBC European Service.

The BBC World Service announcement and the chimes of Big Ben at midnight GMT, 1 January 2009

In addition to these tunes, the BBC World Service also uses several interval signals. The English service uses a recording of Bow Bells, made in 1926 and used a symbol of hope during World War II, only replaced for a brief time during the 1970s with the tune to the nursery rhyme "Oranges and Lemons". The morse code of the letter "V" has also been used as a signal and was introduced in January 1941 and had several variations including timpani, the first four notes of Beethoven's Fifth Symphony (which coincide with the letter "V"), and electronic tones which until recently remained in use for some Western European services. In other languages, the interval signal is three notes, pitched B–B-C. However, these symbols have been used less frequently.

=== Time ===
The network operates using Greenwich Mean Time, regardless of the time zone and time of year, and is announced on the hour on the English service as "13 hours GMT" (13:00 GMT) or "Midnight Greenwich Mean Time" (00:00 GMT). The BBC World Service traditionally broadcasts the chimes of Big Ben in London at the start of a new year.

=== "This is London" ===
A BBC News report would begin with its station identification phrase "This is London" or "This is London calling". The phrase has become a trademark of the BBC World Service, and has been influential in popular culture, such as music. In 1979, the British punk rock band The Clash released the hit song "London Calling", which was partly based on the station identification phrase.

== Magazine publishing ==
The BBC World Service previously published magazines and programme guides:

- London Calling: listings
- BBC Worldwide: included features of interest to an international audience (included London Calling as an insert)
- BBC on Air: mainly listings
- BBC Focus on Africa: current affairs

== Assessments ==
=== British soft power ===
The World Service claims that its aim is to be "the world's best-known and most-respected voice in international broadcasting, thereby bringing benefit to the UK, the BBC, and to audiences around the world", while retaining a "balanced British view" of international developments. In 2022, the Financial Times wrote that the World Service "is considered a pillar of British soft power", and a House of Lords Library report noted the widespread recognition of this soft power. According to the American socialist magazine Monthly Review in 2022, former director Peter Horrocks inferred the World Service's scope to Russian state broadcaster RT as a means of extending international influence and soft power.

In 2014, Conservative MP John Whittingdale, chair of the Culture, Media and Sport Select Committee, characterising the BBC's primary mission as fighting an 'Information War' (a role which some media scholars agree to), saying: "We are being outgunned massively by the Russians and Chinese and that's something I've raised with the BBC. It is frightening the extent to which we are losing the information war." In March 2022, as the Russian invasion of Ukraine started, the UK government announced additional emergency funding for the World Service to provide "independent, impartial and accurate news to people in Ukraine and Russia in the face of increased propaganda from the Russian state" and to counter "Putin's lies and exposing his propaganda and fake news".

=== BBC Persian Service ===
In the context of the Iranian Revolution, the BBC World Service's Persian-language service has been criticised for its role in promoting the Shah's regime and undermining local norms in favour of British-selected values, with the British Ambassador in Iran, Peter Ramsbotham, stating in reaction to a Service-sponsored poetry contest (in celebration of the 2500th anniversary of the founding of the Archaemenid empire) that the organisation "seems to be damaging its image by acquiring a reputation for employing and supporting 'old brigade' expatriates."

Furthermore, it appears that the Foreign & Commonwealth Office made a concerted effort to produce favourable coverage of Persia to BBC World Service audiences in order to maintain cordiality with the Shah's regime. For example, in December 1973, a memo from Ramsbotham details a request from the Iranian Prime Minister for the text of a broadcast about Iran by Peter Avery, lecturer in Persian Studies and Fellow at King's College, Cambridge, which he deemed 'excellent' and wanted to show the Shah. This later became the programme Iran: Oil and the Shah's Arab Neighbours which was aired globally on 1 December 1973, much to the chagrin of the Iranian people, who began airing their frustrations against the British government out on the BBC Persian Service; By 1976, Ramsbotham's successor, Sir Anthony Parsons, concluded that the Persian Service has lost its propaganda value and supported discontinuing the service: "[It] is well known that the vernacular service is financed by the FCO and is therefore firmly considered by the Iranians as an official organ of the government."

In September 2022, the World Service announced the closure of its Persian and Arabic radio services as part of a cost-cutting plan, but the online and TV services would remain.

== See also ==
- 1988–1994 British broadcasting voice restrictions – Partial ban on voices of specific speakers
- BBC Media Action – BBC's charity organization
- BBC World Service Television – Former BBC international satellite television channels

== Works cited ==
- Plock, Vike Martina (20 September 2021). The BBC German Service during the Second World War. Palgrave Studies in the History of the Media. Cham: Palgrave Macmillan. doi:10.1007/978-3-030-74092-4. ISBN 978-3-030-74091-7.
- Seul, Stephanie (2 October 2015). "'Plain, unvarnished news'?: The BBC German Service and Chamberlain's propaganda campaign directed at Nazi Germany, 1938–1940". Media History. 21 (4): 378–396. doi:10.1080/13688804.2015.1011108. ISSN 1368-8804.
- Goodwin, Peter (2005). "Low Conspiracy? – Government interference in the BBC". Westminster Papers in Communication and Culture. 2 (1): 96–118. doi:10.16997/wpcc.10. ISSN 1744-6708.
- Milland, Gabriel (1998). "The BBC Hungarian service and the final solution in Hungary". Historical Journal of Film, Radio and Television. 18 (3): 353–373. doi:10.1080/01439689800260231. ISSN 0143-9685.
- Rawnsley, Gary D. (1996). Radio Diplomacy and Propaganda. London: Palgrave Macmillan UK. doi:10.1007/978-1-349-24499-7. ISBN 978-1-349-24501-7.
- Briggs, Asa (23 March 1995). The War of Words: The History of Broadcasting in the United Kingdom: Volume III. Oxford University Press. doi:10.1093/acprof:oso/9780192129567.001.0001. ISBN 978-0-19-212956-7.
- "Keeping BBC Unfettered". Economic and Political Weekly. 3 (44): 1680. 1968. ISSN 0012-9976. JSTOR 4359258.
