= Grand Mosque of Bint Jbeil =

Former mosque in Southern Lebanon

- A picture of the mosque before its destruction (March 2025)

Religion
- Affiliation: Islam
- Sect: Shia
- Region: Bint Jbeil District
- Ecclesiastical or organizational status: Defunct
- Status: Defunct

Location
- Country: Lebanon
- Interactive map of Grand Mosque of Bint Jbeil
- Coordinates: 33.1189°N 35.4335°E

Architecture
- Established: XVII Century (Ottoman Period)
- Destroyed: April 2026

The Great Mosque of Bint Jbeil was a mosque in Bint Jbeil, Lebanon that was built in the 17th century and destroyed in 2026. During the Battle of Bint Jbeil between Hezbollah and Israel, in the course of the 2026 Lebanon War, the mosque was destroyed by the Israel Defense Forces. The destruction is one of the instances of the numerous destruction of cultural heritage sites registered during the 2026 Iran war. The structure was completely destroyed and reduced to rubbles.

== History ==
=== Construction ===
At the time of its destruction in 2026, the mosque, was at least 400 years old, thus tracing its foundation in the 17th century, when the territory was part of the Ottoman Empire and during the reign of Qablan ibn Hassan ibn Nassar.

In 1772 an inscription was added to the mosque, which would survive up to its latest years, the inscription went as followed:

In the name of Allah, the Most Gracious, the Most Merciful, this blessed mosque was renovated in seeking the face of Allah by Hajj Ali, son of the late Hajj Ahmad al-Bazzi, may Allah reward him as He rewards the righteous, and may he receive the reward of Allah on the Day of Resurrection. This was in the middle of one thousand one hundred and thirty-four (Hijri)

=== Contemporary period ===
==== 19th century ====
The presence of the mosque was documented by the PEF's Survey of Western Palestine (SWP) in 1881 during a survey of the area.

In 1883, after the mosque had fallen into disrepair, Hajj Suleiman Bazzi commissioned its reconstruction under the supervision of the Faqīh Sheikh Moussa Sharareh. The rebuilding used structures from the remains of an earlier, unidentified ancient ruin. Two master builders were brought from Safed, Abu Ahmad Hamidi al-Safadi and Saleh al-Safadi, and after completing the work they were paid respectively with half a French gold franc and two Majidi coins.

==== 20th century ====
In the 20th Century a series of changes occurred in the structure of the mosque. In 1932, worshippers extended the prayer hall nine meters to the east, in 1945, a surrounding courtyard wall was constructed with a northern gate, and an arched stone portico supported by decorated columns was added along the northern side. In 1960, community leader Mohammad Raouf Ali Yousuf Bazzi, descendent of Hajj Suleiman Bazzi, funded the construction of an iwan, which expanded the mosque.

==== 21st century ====
During the 2006 Battle of Bint Jbeil the mosque was damaged due to the combats between the Israeli Defense Forces and Hezbollah. However, following the end of the war, Sheikh Hamad bin Khalifa Al Thani, the emir of Qatar, funded the reconstruction of the Great Mosque with a fund specialized to restore the town's structures to a status before the war.

In October 2024 a historical minaret of the mosque was completely destroyed by an Israeli airstrike.

== Destruction ==
During the 2026 Battle of Bint Jbeil, during which 90% of the town faced severe damages or complete destruction, the mosque was destroyed completely by the IDF operating in the town, alongside most of the cultural heritage present in the town.
