= Battle of Bint Jbeil =

Battle of Bint Jbeil may refer to:

- Battle of Bint Jbeil (2006)
- Battle of Bint Jbeil (2026)
