= Roi Klein =

Israeli army officer

- רועי קליין
- Born: July 10, 1975; Ra'anana, Israel
- Died: July 26, 2006 (aged 31); Bint Jbeil, Southern Lebanon
- Military career
- Allegiance: Israel
- Branch: Israel Defense Forces
- Rank: Major
- Unit: Battalion 51 of the Golani Brigade
- Commands: Deputy battalion commander
- Conflicts: South Lebanon conflict Second Intifada; 2006 Lebanon War: Battle of Bint Jbeil (DOW)
- Awards: Medal of Courage

Roi Klein (Hebrew: רועי קליין; IPA: [ʁoˈʕi klain]; July 10, 1975 – July 26, 2006) was an Israeli major in the Golani Brigade of the Israeli Defense Forces and one of its most highly decorated soldiers. He died during the 2006 Lebanon War, during the Battle of Bint Jbeil, after jumping on a grenade to save his fellow soldiers.

== Early life ==
Klein was born and raised in Ra'anana, Israel. His parents, Aharon and Shoshana Klein, were Holocaust survivors. His father's side originated from Germany and fled to Israel at the onset of World War II. Most of his mother's family was killed in the Holocaust.

Klein was involved in the Bnei Akiva youth movement as a teenager. He excelled in his studies at the Amit Technological High School, completing his mathematics matriculation in 10th grade, and took a few undergraduate mathematics courses during high school. After graduating high school, he studied at the Bnei David mechina (pre-military preparatory school). He studied Jewish religious texts and took part in hard physical training to prepare for his service. As his service approached he increased his physical training, and embarked on long-distance runs from Raanana to Netanya.

== Later life and military service ==
Klein was drafted into the IDF in August 1994. He was accepted into the Paratroopers Brigade. During this time, the South Lebanon conflict was happening, with the IDF fighting Lebanese guerrillas in the Israeli security zone in southern Lebanon. To counter guerrilla attacks, the IDF set up the Egoz Reconnaissance Unit, an elite unit of the Golani Brigade, which was to conduct raids against guerrillas, and Roi's unit was among those selected to be its founding members. As a result, Klein became a member of the Golani Brigade, and would rise through its ranks. Klein served in the southern Lebanon security zone before being honorably discharged from the army in August 1998.

After his discharge, Klein returned to the mechina, where he devoted himself to Torah study for a year, then went on a two-month tour of Africa. When he returned to Israel, he accepted an offer from Hagai Mordechai, the commander of the Egoz Unit, to return to service and supervise training procedures in the unit. One year later, he re-entered military service as the Egoz Unit's training platoon commander. He built a training plan that would subsequently become the model for the Egoz Unit. During the Israeli withdrawal from southern Lebanon in 2000, Roi was leading a final mission in the Bint Jbeil area, leading a unit of Egoz cadets on a stakeout on the request of Hagai Mordechai so the trainees could experience "a taste of Lebanon", and were left behind by the premature IDF withdrawal, leaving them trapped in Lebanon. The unit was ultimately extracted by helicopter.

In 2001, during the Second Intifada, Klein commanded an ambush in the Nablus area in which five Palestinian terrorists were killed. The following year, he was commended for this action.

In 2002, Klein met his future wife Sarah, originally from Denmark, through mutual friends, and married shortly after. The couple moved to the West Bank and built a home in the Israeli outpost of Hayovel, near the settlement of Eli. The couple had two sons: Gilad and Yoav.

That same year, Klein began to study for a degree in Industrial Engineering and Management as part of a special program for military personnel, with his tuition fees to be paid by the army. Despite having been accepted into the Technion, one of Israel's most prestigious universities, Klein instead chose to study at the Ariel University Center of Samaria in the West Bank settlement of Ariel so he could continue to live in Hayovel and pursue religious studies at the kollel in Eli. He excelled in his engineering studies, and qualified for the honors' scholarship every year, meaning the army did not have to pay his tuition. He graduated with honors.

In 2006, Klein was appointed deputy commander of the 51st Battalion of the Golani Brigade, a position he held at the time of his death.

== Death in action ==
During the 2006 Lebanon War, Klein and his unit took part in the Battle of Bint Jbeil. During a Hezbollah ambush, a hand grenade was thrown over the wall that was between Hezbollah militants and Klein and his unit. Klein threw himself onto the live grenade and absorbed the force of the explosion with his body. The soldiers reported that Klein recited the Jewish prayer, Shema Yisrael, as he jumped on the grenade. After the grenade had exploded and critically wounded him, he reported his own death, yelling "Klein's dead, Klein's dead" over the radio. In the following minutes, as he lay dying, he ordered soldiers who came to administer first aid and evacuate him to focus on Lieutenant Amichai Merhavia, another soldier who had been hit (and later also died) instead. He then handed over his encoded radio to another officer, who took command of the force, and died. According to The Telegraph he yelled "Long live Israel", although this was probably a misinterpretation of "Shema Yisrael" (שמע ישראל).

== Legacy ==
Roi Klein became a symbol of heroism in Israel. New schools in Netanya and Raanana have been named after him. Institutions named after Klein exist throughout Israel, and Torah scrolls were written in his honor. The Senior Class 2006 from Leon Pinelo Jewish High School in Lima, Perú, have been named after him.

For his actions during the war, Klein received the Medal of Courage posthumously.

Klein's home was among twelve homes that were subject to a petition by the Israeli group Peace Now demanding they be demolished, claiming they were built on private Palestinian land. In July 2009, the Israel High Court of Justice ordered Israeli Civil Administration to check the legal status of Klein's home, where his family was still residing. Following the court ruling, the Israeli Civil Administration surveyed the land and found that of the twelve homes, eight, including Klein's home, were built on land that had been leased by Israel, and they were later regulated by Israel. Eventually, one home was demolished in 2015. The Israeli Ministry of Defense said that any claimants would be given financial compensation if they could prove that they were the original owners of the land.

In 2016, Klein's widow Sarah married Rabbi Yigal Levinstein, who had been one of Klein's teachers.
