= Battle of Bint Jbeil (2026) =

2026 Lebanon war battle

- Part of 2026 Lebanon war and 2026 Iran war
- Israel Hezbollah presence in Lebanon Lebanese territories under Israeli control
Date	9 April 2026 – before 12 May 2026
Location	Bint Jbeil, Lebanon
Result	Israeli victory
Territorial changes	~90% of urban area destroyed or severely damaged and 3,000 housing units leveled (Note: according to Al Jazeera satellite analysis, 28 April 2026); Systematic destruction of the town continues following the ceasefire.

Belligerents
Israel	Hezbollah

Commanders and leaders
(Israel) Guy Levy	(Hezbollah) Ali Reda Abbas X (Hezbollah) Ali Musbah Jaber X

Units involved
Israel Defense Forces; Israeli Ground Forces; 1st "Golani" Brigade; 35th Paratroopers Brigade; 84th "Givati" Brigade; 98th Paratroopers Division; 401st Brigade; Israeli Combat Engineering Corps; Oketz Unit; Israeli Air Force	Hezbollah military; Local garrison; Radwan Force

Strength
Unknown	150+ militants

Casualties and losses
Per Israel: 11 soldiers injured	Per Israel: c. 100 militants killed
- 2 Lebanese Civil Defense members 1 paramedic of the Red Crescent (Lebanon) 1 Lebanese soldier Around 30,000 Lebanese civilians displaced 5 confirmed civilian deaths

The Battle of Bint Jbeil was a battle in the 2026 Lebanon war, within the context of the wider 2026 Iran war. The battle began on 9 April 2026, coinciding with the second day of the Iran war ceasefire, as part of a broader Israeli offensive against Hezbollah that included the 8 April 2026 Lebanon attacks and other operations across southern Lebanon. The timing of the offensive was disputed. Iran, Pakistan, and Hezbollah stated that the ceasefire extended to Lebanon and characterized Israeli operations as violations of the agreement. In contrast, Israel and the United States maintained that the ceasefire did not apply to the Lebanese front, and therefore considered continued military operations against Hezbollah to be legitimate.

The battle was one of the main battlegrounds in Southern Lebanon following the ceasefire. The battle was part of the wider "Operation Silver Plow" announced by Israel Katz.

== Background ==
=== Importance of Bint Jbeil ===
The city has a symbolic importance for Israel. This was the town where Hassan Nasrallah delivered a "victory speech" following the end of the Israeli occupation of Southern Lebanon in the year 2000 and the city is also known as the "capital of resistance" (and "terror capital" by Israel) in Southern Lebanon and the place where Hezbollah defeated the IDF in the Battle of Bint Jbeil of 2006. Al Jazeera's bureau chief in Lebanon wrote that a victory in the town, as such, could strengthen the public image of Benjamin Netanyahu and demonstrate progress in the advance towards the creation of a buffer zone or annexation of the territories south of the Litani River.

The town is also strategically important, as its control ensures also the control of surrounding hills that allow commanding views of south Lebanon. Israel also said that, before the battle, Hezbollah had increased its presence in the city and had stockpiled weapons within it.

General Hisham Jaber, the head of middle eastern center for strategic and military studies suggested that Israel would pursue the full occupation of the town regardless of the cost, even if casualties were to be more than the previous battle for the town.

=== Start of hostilities ===
During the campaign, U.S. and Israeli strikes killed Iran's Supreme Leader, Ali Khamenei. Following Iranian confirmation of his death on 1 March, Hezbollah Secretary-General Naim Qassem vowed to retaliate and "undertake our duty of confronting the aggression", stating that Hezbollah would not leave "the field of honour and resistance".

On 2 March, Hezbollah launched several projectiles into northern Israel, its first such attack since the 2024 ceasefire, targeting a missile defence site near Haifa. The group described the attack as a "defensive act" aimed at forcing Israel to halt its operations in Lebanon and withdraw from occupied areas, stating it was unrelated to the Iran war.

The Israel Defense Forces (IDF) said one projectile was intercepted while others landed in open areas. In response, Israel carried out overnight airstrikes in Beirut and across southern Lebanon, issuing evacuation orders for dozens of communities. The IDF stated the strikes targeted senior Hezbollah figures and infrastructure; it later reported killing Hezbollah intelligence chief Hussain Makled, while early reports suggested other senior leaders may also have been targeted.

=== Iran war ceasefire and Operation Eternal Darkness ===
Pakistan mediated the 2026 Iran war ceasefire and said Lebanon was included in the ceasefire, temporarily halting the 2026 Iran war for two weeks. Shortly after, Israeli prime minister Benjamin Netanyahu denied that was the case alongside U.S. President Donald Trump. On the contrary Pakistan and Iran insisted that Lebanon was included in the ceasefire alongside other nations such as France and Egypt.

Israel soon after initiated Operation Eternal Darkness and struck various sites in Lebanon in what were defined as the largest attacks since the start of the entire war.

=== Israeli mobilization ===
In the midst of this renewed offensive, the IDF also advances in numerous places in Southern Lebanon as to secure various locations.

The IDF adopted a strategy of avoiding immediate direct confrontation in significant urban centers and instead opted to encircle them by securing locations around them and issuing strategic displacement orders for the local populations. Houses in nearby towns were dismantled as to secure IDF positions and the army secured locations near and within Aitaroun and Aiynata to the east and south, from Aita al-Shaab toward the outskirts of Haddatha in the north.

In the 48 hours prior to the start of the battle Rashaf and Aynata were secured to tighten the encirclement around the Bint Jbeil province and the town was shelled by artillery and airstrikes targeted at Hezbollah outposts.

Before the battle Eyal Zamir conducted an assessment tour in the front nearby the city and determined that further operations were to be pursued in the area, later delivering a speech to motivate the units located on the front. The operation was planned weeks before alongside Operation Eternal Darkness.

== Timeline prior to ceasefire (9 April – 16 April) ==
=== 9 April ===
On 9 April 2026 Hezbollah and Israel engaged in skirmishes in the outskirts of the town, initiated by mortar sounds and rockets launched by Hezbollah towards Israeli forces. Israel retaliated and started operations, leading some of Hezbollah's militants to attempt a strategic escape, which led them to be identified by the IDF which eliminated them.

During the first day of battle Hezbollah was using RPGs, light arms, and rocket barrages to defend the town. The 35th Paratroopers Brigade managed to destroy a Hezbollah building, and skirmishes within the town itself were confirmed by local and Israeli journalists. The IDF disarmed and localized local Hezbollah fighters within the town itself who had gathered there in the previous weeks, taking them off guard, and later in the day The Jerusalem Post reported that the IDF, specifically the 98th Paratrooper division, had occupied most of the town.

=== 10 April ===
On 10 April 2026 it was reported by Hezbollah that they had struck Israeli positions on the outskirts of the town. Al Akhbar, a pro-Hezbollah newspaper, reported that Israel allegedly attempted to advance toward the city market, with combat reported around the market area and nearby areas including the Musa Abbas complex, the Liberation Triangle, and the vocational school in the town, the same source also claims that Hezbollah managed to damage a Merkava tank (near the local Al-Ishraq school at around 1:45 pm local time) and a D9 bulldozer operated by the IDF. Direct confrontation near the city market was also reported by Janoubia, an anti-Hezbollah newspaper. The market was later confirmed to have been hit by artillery bombardment during the direct clashes. On the same day it was reported that the IDF possibly controlled two-thirds of the town by day 2. Maariv also reported the presence of the Radwan Force in the town. Two Civil Defense members died from the clashes.

According to Al-Quds, Hezbollah used flexible warfare tactics, including planned ambushes, sniper fire in residential areas, and anti-tank weapons and improvised explosive devices to impede Israeli vehicles in narrow alleyways in the older parts of the town. The report stated that these tactics forced some Israeli forces to withdraw from previously occupied areas and prevented them from fully securing the town during the initial advance.

=== 11 April ===
Hezbollah claimed to have targeted an Israeli tank in the town, hitting it directly in combat.

During the day Israeli forces conducted additional operations near the villages of Rashaf, Beit Lif, and al-Qaouzah. They were also reported to be demolishing structures in Hanine as part of operations advancing toward Ain Ebel, with the aim to enter the town from west and "complete" the siege. Israeli armored units advanced along the Bint Jbeil highway near the Al-Awaini neighborhood in an attempt to reach the local stadium. The stadium is the same one where Nasrallah gave his speech in 2000, and where Mahmoud Ahmadinejad gave his speech in 2010. They reportedly approached to within approximately 300–400 meters of the stadium's perimeter before their advance was confronted by resistance from Hezbollah forces.

Hezbollah fired a barrage of rockets against IDF positions who had camped themselves at the Mouthallath al-Tahrir site in the town, the latest of the three attacks being at around 5:00 pm (local time). At 5:10 pm Hezbollah attacked IDF troops in the outskirts of the town and their vehicles.

=== 12 April ===
The National News Agency and The Times of Israel reported that the IDF was still trying to "take control of the remaining neighborhoods in the city of Bint Jbeil" in the morning of 12 April 2026. In the same report, the NNA stated that the IDF was using artillery positioned on the outskirts of the town to support its offensive inside the town and surrounding areas, and that it was also allegedly sustaining "significant losses" from Hezbollah. Israeli military sources admitted that combat conditions were harsh due to the terrain.

After being contacted by various medias, such as Al Jazeera, Lebanese seucrity sources in the area allegedly stated that the IDF were using warplanes, artillery and phosphorus bombs in the battle and had managed to close and occupy all of the main entrances of the town. The source also stated that the IDF had not managed to conquer the "main landmark" of the town, but that despite that combat continued in all of the neighbourhoods of the town.

The Bint Jbeil hospital became a battle front after a confrontation between the IDF and local Hezbollah militias which exchanged fire against one another. The Givati Brigade managed to occupy the hospital following the clashes, allegedly killing 20 members of Hezbollah and discovering a stash of weaponry within the building (which were used as proofs as to claim the hospital was being used as a military base by Hezbollah). Amongst the units cooperating with the Givati Brigade to take over the hospital, there was the Egoz Unit.

Over the day members of the 98th Paratrooper Division managed to enter the eastern districts of the town alongside the Golani Brigade and confronted Radwan units. The 35th Paratrooper Brigade destroyed a central Hezbollah military structure that served as a forward headquarters located in the proximity of the local school.

The Lebanese Ministry of Public Health announced the death of a paramedic who was member of the Red Crescent.

=== 13 April ===
Hezbollah managed to hit an Israeli command post with drones located between the town of Aynata and the town of Bint Jbeil itself.

After attempting to do so for days, the IDF took control of the Bint Jbeil stadium, with brigadier Guy Levy commenting: "Someone here spoke and boasted about webs and spiders [...] Today, that man no longer exists, the stadium is gone, and his words are worth nothing".

=== 14 April ===
According to Lebanese field military sources the battle was still fierce and Hezbollah had allegedly even managed to repel some of the IDF's attacks. Three Hezbollah operatives surrendered to the IDF, whilst 10 IDF soldiers were reported to be injured (3 of which in critical conditions) after a fight with three Hezbollah militants. The commander of Battalion 52 in Brigade 401 Lieutenant Colonel "A (Anonymous name)" was severely injured during clashes in the town. A photo of an IDF soldier which was identified as being part of the Givati Brigade was photographed standing on a Pro-Hezbollah remembrance monument located in the town, attesting IDF presence in its area.

The town center was visibly in ruins from satellite images.

=== 15 April ===
Lt. Col. Daniel Ella took over the wounded colonel's role and was put in charge 52nd Battalion for the third time in his career to lead it during the battle temporarily.

=== 16 April ===
The IDF claimed the death of Ali Reda Abbas and other unnamed commanders, and alleged to have eliminated over 150 militants by the end of operations.

== Timeline during ceasefire (17 April – Ongoing) ==
=== 17 April ===
Following the 2026 Israel-Lebanon ceasefire clashes between Hezbollah and Israel in the town were formally stopped, which according to by an analysis by the Foundation for Defense of Democracies think tank prevented an imminent Hezbollah defeat and gave room for the organization to regroup and rebuild its presence in the town.

=== 19 April ===
Despite no proper military initiative due to the ceasefire, Israeli tanks continued to patrol the streets of the town and Israeli forces demolished various buildings including houses within it. The move has been described as a way to "clear" the area.

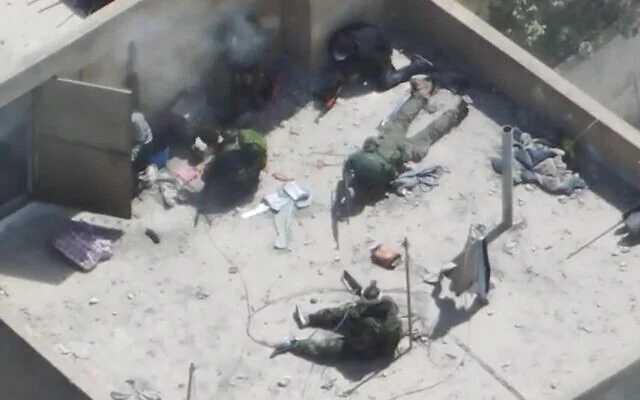
Hezbollah fighters on a rooftop in Bint Jbeil, 24 April 2026

=== 22 April ===
Israel was reported to be using robotic warfare by using an AI powered robot produced by Ruby.AI Robotic Technologies in tunnels within the city. The robots are under the command of the Israeli Combat Engineering Corps.

=== 24 April ===
The IDF said that a canine named Bernie from the Oketz Unit was killed after revealing the location of a Hezbollah cell in Bint Jbeil, adding that all six militants were killed within an hour and a half of their identification and accused the group of violating the Israel- Lebanon truce. Another incident occurred when the 98th Paratroopers Division clashed with Hezbollah fighters, resulting in the death of ten militants.

== Aftermath ==
By 28 April 2026, the town of Bint Jbeil had been devastated, with around 90% of its urban area destroyed or severely damaged. Cultural heritage sites were entirely erased (including the Grand Mosque), agricultural land was left infertile and unusable due to incendiary weapons and white phosphorus, and both healthcare and educational infrastructure were ruined. Water supplies were also rendered unusable, effectively reducing the town to rubble. The population of the town was forcefully displaced, leaving almost no permanent residents left. What remained of the town, by early May was being systematically destroyed.

Lebanon, referring to the battle, accused Israel of urbicide. Municipalities additionally mentioned the accusation of ecocide and domicide, similar accusations to those made following other key battles such as the Battle of Khiam.

On 11 May Lebanese Prime Minister Nawaf Salam described the condition of Bint Jbeil as akin to Gaza following the Gaza war.

== Reactions ==
=== Israel ===
Upon visiting Bint Jbeil during the battle, Northern Command Chief Major General Rafi Milo stated that the clashes could be considered "a significant operational process".

=== Lebanon ===
Lebanese MP Hassan Fadlallah commented on the battle highlighting the "resistance" of the city and commenting that "The authority in Beirut is indifferent to what is happening in the Southern land and has abandoned it; only the resistance fighters are defending it".

The day prior to the start of the battle, Hezbollah had retaliated in the optic of the strikes that had occurred in Beirut, however, as the battle in the town began, the focus of retaliation became tied to the battle specifically.

Mohamad Ali El Husseini, the Secretary-General of the Arab Islamic Council in Lebanon, commented that the form, complexity and brutality of the battle reminded him of the Battle of Stalingrad.

Following the ceasefire Lebanese Army Commander Gen. Rodolph Haykal visited the nearby headquarters of the 5th Intervention Regiment in Kfar Dounine and congratulated them for their professionalism during the clashes.

=== UNIFIL ===
Irish Defence Forces operating in a UNIFIL base known as Camp Shamrock stated that "all necessary force protection measures continue to be observed", with the base itself, however, stressing how the clashes posed a threat of collateral damage to the base.

=== International ===
The Italian newspaper il manifesto defined the battle as more important than the Lebanese-Israeli talks scheduled in Washington D.C at roughly the same time as the battle was being fought.
