= Aql Hashem =

Lebanese military officer

- عقل هاشم
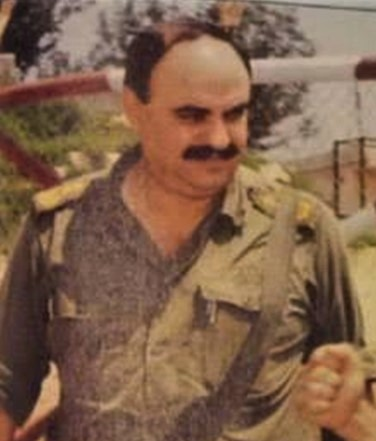

Personal details
- Born: 1952 Debel, Lebanon
- Died: January 30, 2000 (aged 47–48) Debel, Lebanon
- Spouse: Lea Kassab
- Children: Rita, Odine, Elias, Georges and Chantal
- Occupation: Military officer

Military service
- Allegiance: Army of Free Lebanon; South Lebanon Army
- Years of service: 1976–2000
- Rank: Colonel
- Battles/wars: Lebanese Civil War; 1978 South Lebanon conflict South Lebanon conflict (1985–2000) †

Aql Hashem (Arabic: عقل هاشم; 1952 – January 30, 2000; also spelled Akel Hashem) was a Lebanese military officer and Colonel in the South Lebanon Army (SLA) and served under Major Saad Haddad and later Lieutenant General Antoine Lahad. He was killed in a remote-controlled bomb attack by Hezbollah in his farm in January 2000. His death was widely interpreted as the beginning of the end of the Israel-backed SLA.

== Biography ==
Aql Hashem was a Maronite Christian born in 1952 at the small village of Debel in Southern Lebanon, close to the Israeli border. Hashem early decided on a military career and by the time the Lebanese Civil War broke out in 1975, he had reached the rank of Sergeant in the Lebanese Army.

When the Lebanese Armed Forces structure collapsed in January 1976, he defected and joined then Major Saad Haddad's Army of Free Lebanon (AFL) faction in Marjayoun (later known as the Free Lebanese Army or FLA), which was widely seen as an Israeli proxy force. After Haddad's death in 1984, the FLA was reorganized as the SLA under the command of retired Lieutenant General Antoine Lahad. Two years later Hashem was promoted to Colonel and assumed command of the western sector of the security zone. Col. Hashem was also head of the SLA's Security Service, since he spoke fluent Hebrew and had excellent relations with the Israelis.

Hashem was sentenced to death in absentia for treason by a Lebanese military court. He was widely considered a traitor in Lebanon because of his collaboration with Israel. This was especially true among the Muslim Shia majority population of Southern Lebanon. The resistance to the Israeli occupation, where the SLA was considered partners, increased in the 1990s. Hezbollah referred to SLA as Israel's "sandbags".

Hashem was responsible for the day-to-day operations of the SLA and was set to replace Lahad as commander, who was going to retire. He had avoided many previous assassination attempts by Hezbollah fighters and was generally considered as "untouchable". As Hezbollah stepped up its attacks on the Israel Defense Forces (IDF) and SLA positions in Southern Lebanon throughout the 1990s, morale plummeted in the SLA and many of its members defected, giving up information to Hezbollah

== Death ==
On 30 January 2000, Hezbollah finally succeeded in assassinating Hashem by a remote-controlled bomb in his farm outside Debel. The planning and execution of the operation was filmed and broadcast by Hezbollah's own TV-station al-Manar. Two Hezbollah fighters, identified as "Jawad, 25 " and "Hadi, 28" were interviewed and told in detail about the operation. One of the participants of the assassination was Khalid Bazzi, who would later serve as the Hezbollah commander of Bint Jbeil during the 2006 Lebanon War. IDF Brigadier General Efraim Sneh blamed Syria for the assassination.

The South Lebanon Army collapsed in April 2000, less than six months after Hashem's death. Hundreds of former SLA officers and soldiers fled to Israel with their families. Those SLA members who chose to remain in Lebanon were arrested by either Hezbollah guerrillas, Amal fighters or the Internal Security Forces (ISF) and the Lebanese Army, being sentenced to varying prison terms for their crimes. Hashem's family fled to Israel, but his wife and his two children later returned to Lebanon in 2013.

== See also ==
- Army of Free Lebanon
- South Lebanon Army
- Lebanese Civil War
- 1978 South Lebanon conflict
- 1982 Lebanon War
- South Lebanon conflict (1985–2000)

== Bibliography ==
- Nicholas Blanford, Rob Shapiro, et al, Warriors of God, Inside Hezbollah's Thirty-Year Struggle Against Israel, Random House, New York 2011. ISBN 978-1400068364
- Zahera Harb, Channels of Resistance in Lebanon, Liberation, Propaganda, Hezbollah and the Media, I.B. Tauris, London 2011. ISBN 978-1848851207
