= Khalid Bazzi =

Hezbollah military commander

- Born: March 15, 1969; Bint Jbeil, Lebanon
- Died: July 29, 2006 (aged 37); Bint Jbeil, Lebanon
- Burial place: Bint Jbeil, Lebanon
- Military career
- Allegiance: Hezbollah
- Branch: The Islamic Resistance in Lebanon
- Service years: 1986–2006
- Rank: Commander (Arabic: قائد, romanized: qā’id)
- Nickname: al-Hajj Qasim
- Commands: Chief of Operations, Bint Jbeil sector
- Conflicts: Lebanese Civil War; South Lebanon conflict; 2006 Lebanon War; Battle of Maroun al-Ras; Battle of Bint Jbeil †

Khalid Ahmad Bazzi (Arabic: خالد أحمد بزي; March 15, 1969 – July 29, 2006) was a Lebanese military commander in Hezbollah's military wing, the Islamic Resistance in Lebanon. In the 2006 Lebanon War, he was commanding officer in the battles of Maroun ar-Ras and Bint Jbeil.

== Early life ==
Bazzi was born in the town of Bint Jbeil in South Lebanon. He joined Hezbollah as a teenager, and fought against the Israelis in the South Lebanon conflict in Israeli-occupied southern Lebanon.

Bazzi was thirteen years old in 1982 when the 1982 Lebanon War broke out and his hometown was occupied by Israel for the third time in his lifetime (Bint Jbeil was occupied in Operation Cauldron 4 Extended in 1972 and Operation Litani in 1978). This time the Israelis would occupy the area for 18 years. The Shiite population of Southern Lebanon had suffered during the years of fighting between the Palestinian guerrillas and Israeli military since the 1970s. Many residents of South Lebanon felt an initial relief after the Palestinian guerrillas where pushed back from the area. This feeling soon turned sour when it became clear that the Israelis were there to stay. An armed resistance developed, this time among the Shiite population of South Lebanon that constituted the majority population in the area.

Bazzi thus grew up under the Israeli occupation. Some of his relatives had previously been active in the Palestine Liberation Organization (PLO). Bazzi and his friends soon became sympathetic or even active in the emerging Islamic Resistance.

In 1985, Israel withdrew from most of south Lebanon but continued to control a security zone, comprising about 10 per cent of the area of Lebanon. The IDF launched purges in the Shiite villages remaining under occupation, arresting people suspected of being involved in the resistance. Several of Bazzi’s friends were arrested and taken to the notorious Khiam detention center. Bazzi himself fled his home one night and slipped out of the security zone. He went to Beirut and started studying at the university. He soon dropped out of school and became a full-time activist in the resistance.

== Military career ==
During his more than 20 years of resistance activity he participated in many operations, such as the famous Bra'shit operation in 1987, where Hezbollah fighters stormed and conquered a South Lebanon Army (SLA) outpost in the security zone. A number of the outpost's defenders were killed or taken prisoner and the Hezbollah flag was raised on top of it. A Sherman tank was destroyed and a M113 armoured personnel carrier was captured and driven triumphantly all the way to Beirut.

Bazzi was involved in the planting of deadly road side bombs, such as in the villages of Houla, Markaba and al-Abbad in the 1990s. He took part in the attempted assassination Brig. Gen. Eli Amitai, the head of the Israel Defense Forces liaison unit in southern Lebanon and thus the effective commander of the security zone. December 14, 1996, Amitai was injured when the IDF convoy he was travelling in was ambushed in the eastern sector of the security zone. Less than a week later, Amitai was again injured when Hezbollah unleashed a mortar barrage on an SLA position near Bra'shit when Amitai invited Maj. Gen. Amiram Levin, head of the IDF's Northern Command, to the area.

He also took part in the assassination of several high-ranking South Lebanon Army (SLA) officers, whom Hezbollah considered traitors, including Aql Hashem, the SLA Second-in Command, who was killed by a remote-controlled bomb in January 2000. The pursuit and assassination of Hashem was documented step by step, and the footage was broadcast on Hezbollah's TV channel al-Manar. The operation and the way it was presented in media dealt a devastating blow to the morale in the SLA.

== After 2000 ==
After the Israeli withdrawal from South Lebanon, Khalid Bazzi returned to his hometown, Bint Jbeil, and continued his involvement with military activities. He was made responsible for commanding Hezbollah's operations. He took part in the Ghajar raid in 2005, when four Hezbollah fighters were killed in an attempt to abduct an Israeli soldier. Bazzi organized the 2006 Hezbollah cross-border raid, in which eight Israeli soldiers were killed and two were abducted, which ultimately triggered the 2006 Lebanon War.

After the abduction of the two soldiers, Bazzi returned to his post as Chief of Operations in the Bint Jbeil area, comprising the towns of Bint Jbeil and Aynata and the villages of Maroun ar-Ras and Aytaroun. He commanded a force of approximately 140 fighters, spread out in the area.

Bazzi participated in the Battle of Maroun al-Ras. The Israeli army eventually conquered most of the village after 10 days of fighting. The Hezbollah defenders eventually withdrew causing heavy casualties to the Israelis, including two IDF officers and six other soldiers killed. Due to Bazzi's reluctance to use two-way radios, contact was lost with him several times during the battle and at one time it was feared that he had been killed. He emerged however unscathed and continued to lead the defense from Bint Jbeil. According to Hezbollah only seven of the 17 defenders of Maroun ar-Ras were killed in that battle.

== Death ==
On July 29, Bazzi was killed in an Israeli drone strike on a house in the Old Town of Bint Jbeil. The house collapsed, killing him, as well as fellow Hezbollah commander Sayyid Abu Taam and a third fighter. Their bodies could not be retrieved until several days after the cease-fire.

There are suggestions that Bazzi earlier had refused to obey orders to withdraw from the town saying that he would "only leave as a martyr". Hezbollah commanders who spoke to Lebanese al-Akhbar a year after the war did not confirm this version of events. According to them the proper place for a commander was with the fighters on the battlefield. Bazzi and Abu Taam however were criticized for violating military regulations by being at the same place during a battle.

Bazzi was succeeded as sector commander by Muhammad Qanso, a Hezbollah special forces commander who himself would be killed in an Israeli airstrike 10 days later.

== Legacy ==
Hezbollah is a very secretive organization and members in the military wing are always kept anonymous. Apart from Bazzi’s friends, relatives and neighbours, few Lebanese would have heard of his name before the war of 2006. To his associates in the resistance movement he was known by his nom-de-guerre as al-Hajj Qasim, that members of the Islamic Resistance use inside the movement. Only with his death did his identity become widely known in Lebanon.

Hezbollah secretary-general Hassan Nasrallah noted in an interview with Al Jadeed shortly after the war (August 27, 2006) that none of the first or second level of the party officials had martyred but that three third level leaders had died in the war. Among them was "an operations officer in the Bint Jbeil axis". Although not mentioned by name, this was an obvious reference to Bazzi. The other two commanders Nasrallah referred to were Muhammad Qanso and Muhammad Wahbi Surour.

On the first anniversary of his death in 2007, Lebanese newspaper al-Akhbar revealed that Bazzi both took part in the cross-border operation and that he died as commander in the battle of Bint Jbeil.

Israel seemed long to have been unaware of the significant role, Bazzi played both in the abduction of the two Israeli soldiers and in the battle of Bint Jbeil and of his death in this battle. When a captured Hezbollah fighter, who participated in the abduction operation, told his captors that he had been commissioned his tasks by "al-Hajj Qasim" (Bazzi's nom de guerre), his interrogators only responded: "which Qasim?". According to Robert Baer, the former CIA case officer in Lebanon, the Americans and the Israelis never knew the identities of Hezbollah's field commanders.

Israeli newspapers did not notice his existence until six years after in was made public in Lebanon. In July 2013, Haaretz reported that Hezbollah "for the first time" revealed the identity of Khalid Bazzi as the commander of the abduction unit and that he was subsequently killed in the war.

Khalid Bazzi was buried in the Martyrs’ cemetery in Bint Jbeil. A monument was erected in the town celebrating him and five other commanders or fighters from Bint Jbeil, who died in the 2006 war or in previous wars. He was survived by his wife and three children, Zaynab, Muhammad and Ali. His family has reportedly had to change homes 14 times in the past 18 years due to security considerations.
