= En-hazor =

Fortified settlement in the Book of Joshua

En-hazor ("fount of Hazor") is a fortified settlement named in the Book of Joshua as part of the inheritance of Naphtali, distinct from a settlement called Hazor mentioned in the same context.

Its location has not been identified, though a number of possible sites have been proposed. Yohanan Aharoni suggested that it was located at Aynata in Lebanon. Alternatively, it may have been situated at Khirbet Hazzur on the slopes of the mountains of Upper Galilee, west of Kedesh, though no fountain has been found here.
