= Battle of Maroun al-Ras (2006) =

Engagement in the 2006 Lebanon War

Coordinates: 33.0889°N 35.4267°E

- Part of 2006 Lebanon War
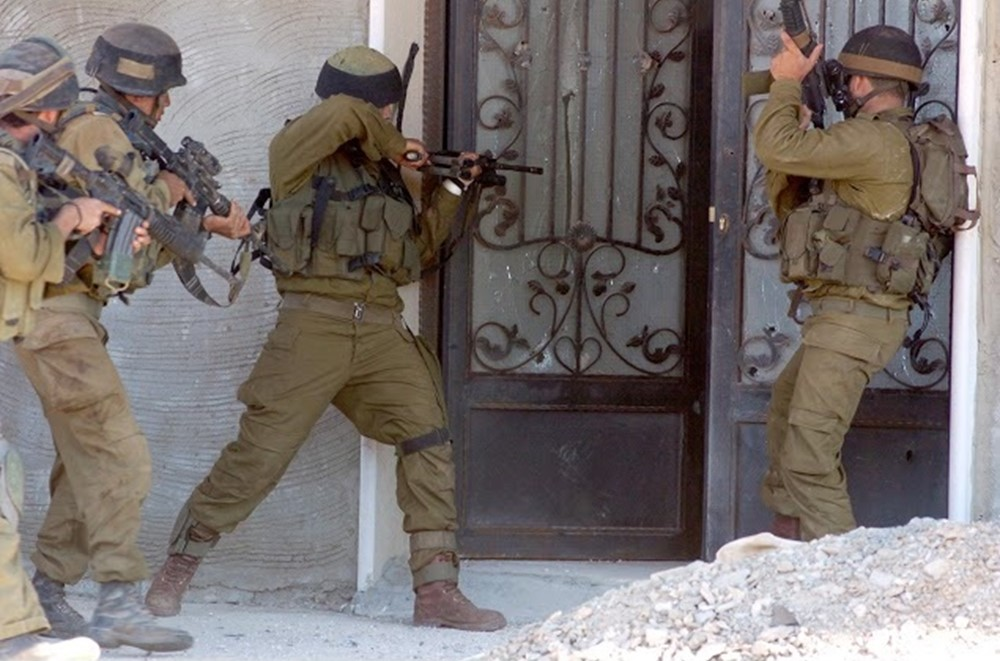
- IDF soldiers operating in Maroun al-Ras
Date	19 – 29 July 2006
Location	Maroun al-Ras, Lebanon
Result	Inconclusive: IDF captured most of the village but failed to fully secure it

Belligerents
Israel Defense Forces	Hezbollah; Amal

Strength
Unit 621 "Egoz"; Unit 212 "Maglan"; 35th Paratroopers Brigade: 101st Battalion; 5135th Recon Battalion; Engineering Corps Battalion; Tanks from 7th, 188th and 401st armored brigades Units from Air Force and Artillery	17 fighters (Hezbollah claim)

Casualties and losses
8 killed	7 killed (Hezbollah account); 13+ killed (official Israeli account); 26 killed (semi-official Israeli estimate); 1 Amal commander killed

The Battle of Maroun al-Ras was a battle of the 2006 Lebanon War that took place in Maroun al-Ras, a small village in southern Lebanon on the border with Israel, and Jall ad-Dayr, a nearby Hezbollah stronghold. This battle was the first serious ground battle in the 2006 Lebanon war. It was fought to a large extent by elite forces on both sides and would have huge consequences for the future of the war. Although Israeli forces captured most of the town, they did not fully secure it.

== The clash at the "Nature Reserve" ==
There are two different Israeli versions about how the battle of Maroun al-Ras actually started. According to Gal Hirsch, commander of the 91st Division, a unit of 18 soldiers from the elite Maglan special reconnaissance were sent out to occupy a Hezbollah position on mount Jall ad-Dayr (before 2000 the place of the IDF outpost Shaked), from which the nearby IDF base of Avivim had been shelled, as well as the small nearby village of Maroun al-Ras. If that version is true it would seem that the IDF had grossly underestimated Hezbollah strength. According to the IDF General Command however, the Maglan unit was on a reconnaissance mission and under strict orders to avoid Hezbollah strongholds or Shiite villages. According to this version the Maglan unit walked into the Hezbollah stronghold by mistake.

After a steep climb up the hill on July 19, the 18-man squad from the Maglan special reconnaissance unit finally reached the summit next to the village. The Israeli soldiers realized that they were surrounded by Hezbollah positions. The squad was instructed to make contact during daylight and a violent close range clash ensued. St.-Sgt. Yonatan Hadasi was hit from close range and St.-Sgt. Yotam Gilboa, the squad paramedic, rushed to his rescue and was also hit from close range. Both were instantly killed and additional nine were injured. The commanding officer and some of the remaining soldiers froze out of shock. Maj. Amit Ze'evi, who took part in the mission as an outsider, took over command, slapping several soldiers into action. The unit claims to have killed five Hezbollah fighters.

The Maglan soldiers had no idea what a Hezbollah Nature Reserve was. Even the IDF officers who ordered the operation thought that it consisted "at most of a cave or bunker". Paratrooper commander Hagai Mordechai said after the war that it was the Nature Reserves that surprised him most in the early battles. "Nature Reserves" became IDF soldiers' slang during the war for well-fortified Hezbollah strongholds, situated outside built-up areas in Southern Lebanon. They had well-protected firing positions for Katyusha rockets, as well as bunkers and tunnels to protect the fighters, usually elite Special Force from the Nasr Unit (Arabic: وحدة نصر, Wahdat Nasr). It was surrounded by booby traps, mines and had CCTV surveillance. Uzi Mahnaimi labeled them "killing boxes". Apparently the IDF Staff tried to do away with the term for fear that the IDF would be perceived to cause some ecological damage. The Nature Reserve at Maroun al-Ras had before the withdrawal in 2000 been an Israeli outpost, code-named "Shaked".

"We didn’t know what hit us," said one of the Maglan soldiers. "In seconds we had two dead." "We expected a tent and three Kalashnikovs – that was the intelligence we were given. Instead, we found a hydraulic steel door leading to a well-equipped network of tunnels."

== The battle of Maroun al-Ras ==
The news about the clash at the Nature Reserve came as a shock to the Israeli General Command. The IDF paratroopers' Recon Company was quickly sent as reinforcements to Maroun al-Ras to help evacuate the entangled Maglan unit. On the night of the 19th of July, the paratroopers moved towards the village accompanied by two tanks of the 7th regiment. On the morning of the 20th, the two tanks had reached the outskirts of the village and were ambushed by anti tank missiles. The paratroopers suppressed the village, helping the tanks to evacuate, and sent a team of 6 to enter a house to secure the parameter from above. As they entered the house the paratroopers found it to have big windows, which endangered them, and thus decided to move on to another house. As the commander of the team left the house he was caught by heavy fire, including missiles on the house. The house was burning, and so the commander and another soldier tried to enter the house from the southern part, to meet the entangled soldiers inside, yet were fired upon again. At this time, a Hezbollah fighter threw a grenade at the two soldiers, but the commander took the grenade and threw it back, killing the Hezbollah fighter. The two soldiers couldn't make it into the burning house, so they reached another house where the major was stationed. Several Hezbollah fighters charged into the house, but were repelled and killed from effective fire directed at them from the house. After five hours, the trapped soldiers made it outside the burning house, covered by artillery and helicopters, and reached the main house, whilst capturing a Hezbollah radio transmitter. The forces listened to Hezbollah fighters, and acquired knowledge of their whereabouts. The soldiers used sniper fire on the remaining Hezbollah fighters, and in the evening the Hezbollah commander ordered a withdrawal from the village. None of the paratroopers were injured during this battle.

On the same morning of July 20, the commander of the elite Egoz Reconnaissance Unit, Lieutenant Colonel Mordechai Kahana, was summoned to his brigade officer and was ordered to help extricate the supposedly trapped paratroopers. Egoz was created in 1995 specifically for the purpose of fighting Hezbollah in Southern Lebanon. Kahana at first rejected the notion of advancing through open terrain in broad daylight. "This is a suicide mission," he claimed, but in the end he complied.

By the end of the day "thousands" of Israeli soldiers were operating in South Lebanon, apparently mainly in and around Maroun al-Ras. The Israeli soldiers were "searching for tunnels... often dug under homes in villages". An Egoz company attacked a suspicious vehicle, apparently transporting wounded Hezbollah fighters that were injured during the battle with Paratrooper Reconnaissance, to the nearby town of Bint Jbeil. The unit was then noticed by Hezbollah units in Bint Jbeil, which attacked the Israelis with a volley of Sagger missiles, killing a senior officer, Major Benjamin Hillman, and two soldiers. Another Egoz company were sent in to evacuate the dead and the wounded but were targeted by another volley of Sagger missiles leading to further casualties. Meanwhile, the third company got into a firefight inside the village where another soldier was killed. In total five Egoz soldiers died and six were wounded that day in the fighting. It was the bloodiest day in the unit's history.

One of the Egoz casualties, Yonatan Vlasyuk, was missing and could not be found until the next day.

By evening the paratroopers succeeded in taking control of most of the village. Israeli artillery fired around 8,000 shells on the Nature Reserve and the village on the first two days of battle. Several Hezbollah fighters were killed. The paratroopers discovered a very sophisticated listening post capable of listening in on IDF communications from as far as the West Bank. A paratrooper also picked up a field radio off of a dead Hezbollah fighter, which allowed the troops to listen in on Hezbollah communications, follow their movements, and move to block their counterattacks. News that Maroun al-Ras had been occupied, however, seemed premature. The fighting would continue for several more days. A tank driver from the 7th Brigade told The Jerusalem Post that "many of our tanks took hits, mainly from Sagger rockets; none of the tanks were destroyed but quite a few of our friends were wounded." The IDF claimed that Abu Jaafar, the commander of Hezbollah's central sector, was killed in an exchange of fire during the battle, which was denied by Hezbollah. Crooke and Perry also deny this claim, writing that Abu Jaafar made public comments after the end of the war. However the village commander of the Amal Movement, Hani Alawiya (Abu Ali), was killed in the clashes in Maroun al-Ras on July 20. Khalid Bazzi, the commander of the Hezbollah forces in the Bint Jbeil area personally took part in the battle of Maroun al-Ras. At one point in the battle, contact was lost with him, and it was feared that he had been killed. He later surfaced unharmed but was killed some days later during an air raid in Bint Jbeil. On the eighth day of the battle the IDF suffered its last fatality in the battle, a paratrooper who was killed by a missile.

There are no reports of significant fighting at Maroun al-Ras in the last two weeks of the war. It is unclear whether Israeli forces eventually succeeded in taking control of the whole village. According to Farquhar the village was still "unsecured" by August 5. Israel claims that it overheard a general order to retreat towards Bint Jbeil. Crooke and Perry also maintain that Maroun al-Ras was "never fully taken". BBC reported a week after the ceasefire came into effect that Israel only occupied the southern side of the village while Hezbollah maintained a "discreet presence" in the other parts of the village. There are no clear indications that the IDF actually took control over the Jall ad-Dayr ("Shaked") Nature Reserve or whether rockets were continued to be fired from this position. According to an account later published in Israel Hayom three soldiers from the Maglan unit eventually stormed the Hezbollah position, killing five Hezbollah fighters and destroying the 'Nature Reserve' with explosives. Amos Harel and Avi Issacharoff's account of the war confirmed that the Maglan soldiers killed five Hezbollah fighters in the encounter but did not mention the destruction of the reserve.

According to the official Israeli account of the battle, 13 Hezbollah fighters were killed in Maroun al-Ras. It was estimated that more Hezbollah fighters were killed, with an officer estimating that at least 30 were killed. However, the fact that soldiers were ordered not to risk themselves to recover enemy bodies made counting the toll more difficult. When the head of the IDF Northern Command Gal Hirsch heard the news he was delighted and informed the Head of Northern Command Adam. Adam was under heavy pressure to present a "victory" and demanded proof in the form of pictures of the dead Hezbollah fighters. The commanders in the field were reluctant to comply, claiming that this would endanger Israeli soldiers. This was probably justified, but shows just how precarious Israeli control of the village was at the time. At the Ministry of Defense there was a widespread suspicion that the claim of 13 killed Hezbollah fighters was just "bragging".

Chief of Staff Dan Halutz ordered all the 13 bodies to be brought to Israel to be shown to the media. Udi Adam and the paratroopers characterized this as a "waste of time". In the end only six bodies of Hezbollah fighters were carried to Israel on stretchers. These six bodies, out of a total of about ten during the entire war (the remainder apparently from the fighting around Bint Jbeil) were later returned to Lebanon in the prisoner exchanges in 2007 and 2008. Other semi-official Israeli estimates claim that 26 Hezbollah fighters died in the battle. According to Hezbollah officials Maroun al-Ras was only defended by 17 soldiers, seven of whom died in the battle.

Hirsch had ordered the military police in Israel to prepare prisoner facilities for 100 prisoners. None were taken in the battle of Maroun al-Ras.

== Aftermath ==
The battle of Maroun al-Ras became a watershed in the Lebanon war. After realizing that the standing army was not enough to defeat Hezbollah, Israel finally decided on July 22 to call in the reserves. This decision increased the options available to Israel and would eventually lead to the decision at the end of July to commence ground operations. Operation Change of Direction 8 was initiated on July 31 with the aim of taking control of a 6- to 8-kilometer-wide "security zone" along the entire Lebanese border, an aim that was never realized. On August 9 Israel launched Operation Change of Direction 11, which aimed at occupying South Lebanon up to the Litani river.

At Maroun al-Ras, the IDF experienced for the first time sustained Hezbollah attacks with anti-tank rockets and guided missiles and especially the deadly effect of the "swarming" technique. As a member of Egoz later told: "What can you do when a missile is being fired at you other than say your prayers?" IDF Northern Command banned the introduction of vehicles to Lebanon, with exception of tanks and heavy APCs, such as the Achzarit. This would have a detrimental effect on IDF's ability to supply its troops later in the war. The battle at Maroun al-Ras, however, showed that not even these heavy armored vehicles were invulnerable to Hezbollah missiles.

The most painful lesson that the IDF learnt at Maroun al-Ras was the deadly effectiveness of Hezbollah "Nature Reserves". After the battle the head of IDF Northern Command Maj. Gen. Udi Adam forbade any further attacks on Nature Reserves. "A nature reserve can swallow an entire battalion," he said. This prohibition would remain in force throughout the war and would to a large extent determine the outcome of the war. The well-entrenched Nature Reserves were not vulnerable to artillery or air bombardment. The decision not to attack these positions, sometimes only hundreds of meters from the Israeli border, made it possible for Hezbollah to continue firing rockets over Northern Israel throughout the war. Most of the short-range Katyusha rockets fired on Israel during the war were fired from Nature Reserves. Human Rights Watch concluded in a report that "Hezbollah stored most of its rockets in bunkers and weapon storage facilities located in uninhabited fields and valleys" and "fired the vast majority of its rockets from pre-prepared positions outside villages."

A report on the war written by the Knesset Foreign Affairs and Defense Committee sharply criticized the decision not to attack Nature Reserves and claimed that it "played into Hezbollah's hands".

== Israeli IDF fatalities ==
Israel officially confirmed that eight soldiers were killed in the battle:

July 19, 2006

- St.-Sgt. Yonatan Hadasi (Maglan), 21, of Kibbutz Merhavia
- St.-Sgt. Yotam Gilboa (Maglan), 21, of Kibbutz Maoz Haim

July 20, 2006

- Maj. Benjamin (Benji) Hillman (Egoz), 27, of Maccabim Re'ut
- St.-Sgt. Refanael Muskal (Egoz), 21, of Mazkeret Batya
- St.-Sgt. Nadav Baeloha (Egoz), 21, of Karmiel
- St.-Sgt. Liran Saadia (Egoz), 21, of Kiryat Shmona
- St.-Sgt. Yonatan (Sergei) Vlasyuk (Egoz), 21, of Kibbutz Lahav

July 26, 2006

- Lt. Yiftah Shreirer (Paratroopers, Bat. 101), 21, of Haifa

== Hezbollah fatalities ==
Hezbollah reported losing 7 soldiers in the battle. The official Israeli account stated that 13 Hezbollah fighters were counted killed. General Udi Adam claimed that Hezbollah's death toll was in fact higher, but could not be fully counted because he had ordered his soldiers not to risk their lives to recover enemy dead. An Israeli officer who took part in the battle estimated that at least 30 Hezbollah fighters were killed. The IDF captured the bodies of 6 Hezbollah fighters.

== Sources ==
- Crooke, Alastair and Mark Perry, How Hezbollah Defeated Israel, Asia Times

PART 1: Winning the intelligence war, Oct 12, 2006
PART 2: Winning the ground war, Oct 13, 2006
PART 3: The political war, Oct 14, 2006

- Erlich, Dr. Reuven (Col. Ret.), "Hezbollah's use of Lebanese civilians as human shields", Intelligence and Terrorism Information Center at the Center for Special Studies (C.S.S), November 2006. [The study was supported by Military Intelligence, the Operations Division of the IDF General Staff, the IDF Spokesperson and the legal experts of the IDF and the Ministry of Foreign Affairs.]
- Farquhar, Lieutenant Colonel Scott C. (2009). Back to Basics, A Study of the Second Lebanon War and Operation Cast Lead (PDF). Fort Leavenworth, Kansas: Combat Studies Institute Press, US Army Combined Arms Center. Archived from the original on April 8, 2013.
- Harel, Amos and Avi Issacharoff, 34 Days: Israel, Hezbollah, and the War in Lebanon, Palgrave Macmillan, New York, 2008
- Rapaport, Amir: Friendly Fire, How We Failed Ourselves in the Second Lebanon War (עמיר רפפורט, "אש על כוחותינו: כך הכשלנו את עצמנו במלחמת לבנון השנייה"), Sifriya Ma'ariv (2007).
