= Hezbollah Nature Reserves =

System of Hezbollah strongholds in southern Lebanon

Hezbollah Nature Reserves were a system of Hezbollah strongholds built in southern Lebanon between the Israeli withdrawal from Lebanon 2000 and the 2006 Lebanon war.

== Origin of term and use of countryside by Hezbollah ==
The term "Nature Reserve" (Hebrew: שמורת טבע, shmorat tev’a) was originally IDF slang and refers to the fact that they were primarily placed in the countryside away from habitation and were declared off-limits to the IDF during the war, due to fear of high casualties.

Human Rights Watch wrote in an extensive report published about a year after the war that "we found strong evidence that Hezbollah stored most of its rockets and missiles in bunkers and weapon storage facilities located in uninhabited fields, forests and valleys,… and that Hezbollah fired the vast majority of its rockets from pre-prepared positions outside villages."

== 2006 Lebanon War ==
=== Battle of Maroun al-Ras ===
The Israeli special forces unit Maglan stumbled into a Nature Reserve near Maroun ar-Ras and suffered heavy casualties. "We didn't know what hit us," said one of the Maglan soldiers. "In seconds we had two dead including the combat medic." "We expected a tent and three Kalashnikovs — that was the intelligence we were given. Instead, we found a hydraulic steel door leading to a very well-equipped network of underground tunnels."

=== Israeli reaction ===
After the battle of Maroun ar-Ras, the head of IDF Northern Command Maj.-Gen. Udi Adam forbade any further attacks on Nature Reserves. "A nature reserve can swallow an entire brigade," he said. According to Haaretz "[t]hroughout the war the General Staff and the Northern Command restricted offensive operations into these areas, following the initial encounter…[at] the "nature reserve" code-named Shaked near the town of Maroun al-Ras."

=== Strategic position ===
The well entrenched Nature Reserves were not vulnerable to heavy artillery or airstrikes. The decision not to attack these positions, sometimes only hundreds of meters from the Israeli border, made it possible for Hezbollah to continue firing rockets over Northern Israel throughout the war. Most of the short range Katyusha rockets fired on Israel during the war were fired from Nature Reserves.

In December 2007 the Knesset Foreign Affairs Committee issued the findings of its investigation into the 2006 war in Lebanon. It condemned the senior IDF command in unusually severe terms and said that the army's methods of fighting "played into Hezbollah's hands." It was especially critical of the delay in launching a ground war and refraining from attacking the Nature Reserves.

=== Labbouna ===
Another Nature Reserve was found at Labbouna, near a forest undergrowth hillside a few hundred meters from the Israeli border and some kilometer from the UNIFIL headquarters at Naqoura. The area was completely sealed off by Hezbollah in 2002 and declared a "military zone". Neither Israel nor UNIFIL understood what Hezbollah was up to until the 2006 war. "We never saw them build anything," a high ranking UNIFIL officer told Nicholas Blanford. "They must have brought the cement in by the spoonful." Hezbollah maintained a clearly visible outpost nearby that was immediately shelled by the IDF on July 12, after the abduction of the two Israeli soldiers. This outpost was only a decoy that was already abandoned, and the fighters had relocated to the covered positions in the Nature Reserves.

Hezbollah had a commanding view of northern Israel all the way to Acre and Haifa. From the first day of the war this Nature reserve was a source of almost constant Katyusha rocket fire. Israel repeatedly tried to knock out the launch site by the use massive artillery and air strikes, including the use of cluster bombs and phosphorus grenades. But the rockets continued to be fired until the last hour before the ceasefire.

Hezbollah fighters completely commanded the terrain to the south and claimed to have destroyed an armored bulldozer and a tank only 6 meters into Lebanese territory, on August 8, 2006. The IDF confirmed that Capt.(res.) Gilad Balhasan, 28, of Karmiel, and St.-Sgt.(res.) Yesamu Yalau, 26, of Or Yehuda were killed in the incident.

The IDF bypassed Labbouna and had it effectively surrounded for the latter part of the war. There are no reports of any IDF attempt to capture the area. Instead, Hezbollah continued to fire rockets at northern Israel until the ceasefire agreement on Aug. 14. Hezbollah fighters who were stationed at Labbouna during the war claim to have launched a raid on an IDF position inside Israeli territory, killing and injuring several Israeli soldiers, including an officer. IDF confirmed that an officer, Maj.Colonel (res.) Nimrod Hillel, was killed, while another IDF soldier was severely wounded, in the area of Labbouna on August 10. According to Hezbollah all of the resistance fighters at Labbouna survived the war, but several fighters reported spitting blood and experiencing prolonged health effects after inhaling white phosphorus.

== Post 2006 war ==
After the ceasefire Hezbollah withdrew from the area in accordance with UN resolution 1701. The IDF then entered the area and destroyed a large bunker system before withdrawing from Lebanon. Towards the end of the war the IDF "chanced" upon what was then an unknown well-equipped bunker system overlooking the road where the abduction of the two soldiers took place.

== Journalist visit to bunker ==
Nicholas Blanford visited an untouched and apparently abandoned Nature Reserve near Rashaf more than six months after the war. The area is about six kilometers from the Israeli border and saw heavy fighting in the last days of the war. The large deserted bunker was accessed through a narrow 6 meter shaft that led into a 60 meters long main passage, with steel doors every 10 meters. Blanford estimated that the main section was 35–50 meters under the surface. The facility was fitted with a communications room, air condition and electricity as well as a bathroom and a kitchen. It had multiple entrances and exits.

After the war UNIFIL searched southern Lebanon and found 33 Nature Reserves scattered across the countryside.

In January 2007 IDF found two underground bunkers, connected by a tunnel, on Israeli territory along the Lebanese border. The bunkers contained food and weapons equipment and were destroyed by the IDF.

== Sources ==
- Blanford, Nicholas, "HIZBULLAH AND THE IDF: ACCEPTING NEW REALITIES ALONG THE BLUE LINE" in THE SIXTH WAR ISRAEL’S INVASION OF LEBANON, The MIT Electronic Journal of Middle East Studies Vol. 6, Summer 2006
- Crooke, Alastair and Mark Perry, HOW HEZBOLLAH DEFEATED ISRAEL, Asia Times

PART 1: Winning the intelligence war, Oct 12, 2006
PART 2: Winning the ground war, Oct 13, 2006
PART 3: The political war, Oct 14, 2006

- Harel, Amos and Avi Issacharoff, 34 Days: Israel, Hezbollah, and the War in Lebanon, Palgrave Macmillan, New York, 2008
