= Beydoun =

Beydoun is a surname. A large number of people with this surname come from Bint Jbeil, a large, predominantly-Shiite town in south Lebanon. Many Beydoun's left Lebanon in 1970s and 1980s to Australia, Canada and America. Notable people with the surname include:

- Abbas Beydoun (born 1945), Lebanese poet, novelist and journalist
- Nasser Beydoun, American business executive
- Ziad Rafiq Beydoun (1924–1998), Lebanese petroleum geologist
