= Hajj Ali =

Village in northern Iraq

Hajj Ali (also: Haj Ali, Hajj 'Ali) is a village at Tigris River in northern Iraq, approximately 60km south of Mosul, in the Nineveh Governorate at the boundaries of Makhmur District. Hajj Ali lies on the north eastern banks of River Tigris, opposite of the oil town of Qayyarah.

Hajj Ali was considered a strategic village for the Mosul offensive in 2016 and was reportedly recaptured by the Iraqi army from ISIL on 13 June 2016.
