= Aynata =

Village in Nabatieh Governorate of Lebanon

Aynata عيناتا
- Municipality
- Location within Lebanon
- Coordinates: 33°7′43.68″N 35°26′6.36″E
- Grid position: 191/281 PAL
- Country: Lebanon
- Governorate: Nabatieh Governorate
- District: Bint Jbeil District
- Elevation: 740 m (2,430 ft)
- Time zone: UTC+2 (EET)
  - Summer (DST): UTC+3 (EEST)

Aynata (Arabic: عيناتا, romanized: ʿAynātā) is a municipality in Lebanon. It is located in the southern part of the country. It is a resilient, nonpolitical and diverse village. During the war with Israel in 2006, about 60% of the homes in the town were destroyed, but continues to be rebuilt.

== History ==
Israeli archaeologist Yohanan Aharoni identified Aynata as ancient En-hazor, and says it appears in the topographical lists of Thutmose III.

In 1854, Charles William Meredith van de Velde proposed that Aynata was Beth-Anath. W.M. Thomson repeated this claim in 1859, and Victor Guérin came to the same conclusion in 1880. The same view was held by historical geographer Georg Kampffmeyer (1892).

Foundations and columns of a ruined temple complex in the woods near the village were recorded by William McClure Thomson, who thought them to have once been called Kubrikha. He remarked that "the whole neighborhood is crowded with ancient but deserted sites."

=== Ottoman era ===
In 1596, it was named as a village, ‘’Aynata’’ in the Ottoman nahiya (subdistrict) of Tibnin under the liwa' (district) of Safad, with a population of 111 households and 22 bachelors, all Muslim. The villagers paid taxes on agricultural products, such as wheat, barley, vineyards, fruit trees, goats and beehives, in addition to "occasional revenues" and a fixed sum; a total of 10,560 akçe.

In 1875, Victor Guérin found a village with 400 Metualis.

In 1881, the PEF's Survey of Western Palestine (SWP) described it: "A village, built of stone, containing about 500 Metawileh. There is a Moslem school in the village; extensive vineyards and a few olives in the wady. Water supplied from birket and many cisterns.”

=== Modern era ===
Aynata is the family home of Mohammad Hussein Fadlallah, a prominent twelver Shia cleric.

During the 2006 Lebanon War, on July 19, an Israeli missile killed 4 civilians in the village. On July 24, Israel shelled two houses in the village; killing all inside both houses. One house had 4 Hezbollah fighters, the other house had 8 civilians, aged between 16 and 77.

Aaynata has a population of around 5,000 (dropping to 1,300 in the winter) and is 120 kilometers (74.568 mi) away from Beirut and sits 740 meters above sea level. The area borders Bent Jbayl, Aitaroun, and Yaroun. It was occupied by Israel and most residents emigrated to Beirut's southern suburbs. Israel pulled out of the area in 2000 and it has seen housing construction since that time. Tobacco and olives are grown in the area.

In 2024, during the conflict between Hezbollah and Israel, the Israeli army attacked two vehicles. Hezbollah soldiers were traveling in one of the vehicles and in the other four family members of the journalist Samir Ayoub who were also killed in the attack.

On 22 February 2025, Hezbollah held a mass funeral for 35 of its fighters who were killed in action.

=== Hezbollah fatalities during 2006 Lebanon War ===
- Mousa Yousuf Khanafer^{*}
- Amir Ibrahim Fadlallah
- Jamil Mahmoud an-Nimr
- Ali Muhammad as-Sayyid Ali
- Mahir Muhammad Sayf ad-Din
- Zayd Mahmoud Haydar^{*}
- Muhammad Dheeb Khanafer
- Kazem Ali Khanafer
- Ammar Habib Qawsan
- Nazim Abdan-Nabi Nasrallah
- Marwan Husayn Samhat^{*}
- Muhammad Hassan Samhat
- Hassan Ismail Mustafa
- Shakir Najib Ghanam

^{*} The body of the fighter was captured by IDF and removed to Israel but was returned to Lebanon in the prisoner exchanges in 2007-08.

== Demographics ==
In 2014 Muslims made up 99.21% of registered voters in Aynata. 97.47% of the voters were Shiite Muslims.

== Bibliography ==
- Conder, C.R.; Kitchener, H.H. (1881). The Survey of Western Palestine: Memoirs of the Topography, Orography, Hydrography, and Archaeology. Vol. 1. London: Committee of the Palestine Exploration Fund.
- Freedman, DN; Astrid B Beck; Allen C Myers, eds. (2000). Eerdmans Dictionary of the Bible. Amsterdam University Press. ISBN 9053565035.
- Guérin, V. (1880). Description Géographique Historique et Archéologique de la Palestine (in French). Vol. 3: Galilee, pt. 2. Paris: L'Imprimerie Nationale.
- HRW (2007). Why They Died: Civilian Casualties in Lebanon During the 2006 War. Human Rights Watch.
- Hütteroth, W.-D.; Abdulfattah, K. (1977). Historical Geography of Palestine, Transjordan and Southern Syria in the Late 16th Century. Erlanger Geographische Arbeiten, Sonderband 5. Erlangen, Germany: Vorstand der Fränkischen Geographischen Gesellschaft. ISBN 3-920405-41-2.
- Kampffmeyer, G. [in German] (1892). Alte Namen im heutigen Palästina und Syrien (in German). Leipzig: Breitkopf & Härtel. pp. 38, 42, 61, 64, 85, 87. OCLC 786490264.
- Palmer, E.H. (1881). The Survey of Western Palestine: Arabic and English Name Lists Collected During the Survey by Lieutenants Conder and Kitchener, R. E. Transliterated and Explained by E.H. Palmer. Committee of the Palestine Exploration Fund.
- Rhode, H. (1979). Administration and Population of the Sancak of Safed in the Sixteenth Century. Columbia University. Archived from the original on 2019-04-20.
- Thomson, W.M. (1859). The Land and the Book: Or, Biblical Illustrations Drawn from the Manners and Customs, the Scenes and Scenery, of the Holy Land. Vol. 1 (1 ed.). New York: Harper & brothers.
- Velde, van de, C.W.M. (1854). Narrative of a journey through Syria and Palestine in 1851 and 1852. Vol. 1. William Blackwood and son.
