= Battle of Bint Jbeil (2006) =

Key engagement in the 2006 Lebanon War

Coordinates: 33°07′15″N 35°26′1″E

- Part of the 2006 Lebanon War
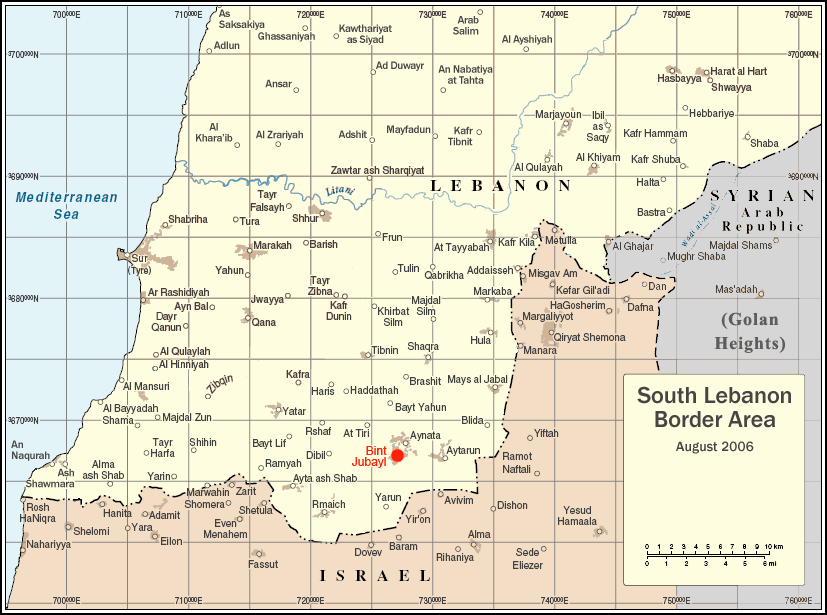
- Map of South Lebanon showing the location of Bint Jbeil
Date	23 July – 11 August 2006 (2 weeks and 5 days)
Location	Bint Jbeil, Southern Lebanon
Result	Hezbollah victory
Territorial changes	IDF failed to capture the town

Belligerents
Israel	Hezbollah

Commanders and leaders
(Israel) Brig. Gen. Gal Hirsch (Israel) Col. Tamir Yedai (Israel) Maj. Roi Klein †	(Hezbollah) Com. Khalid Bazzi † (Hezbollah) Com. Muhammad Abu Ta'am †

Units involved
Israel Defense Forces; Israeli Ground Forces; 35th Paratroopers Brigade; 101st battalion; 890th battalion; Recon company; Golani Brigade; 51st battalion; Egoz Recon unit; 12th battalion; 401st Armored Brigade; 52nd battalion; 7th Armored Brigade; 847th Armored Brigade; Artillery units; Israeli Air Force	Hezbollah military; Local garrison; Nasr Unit, Hezbollah Special Forces unit

Strength
5,000 soldiers	100–150 fighters in the region, incl. 40 Special Forces (IDF estimate)

Casualties and losses
17 IDF soldiers killed	32 killed (Hezbollah claim); 50–70 fighters (IDF claim) "A very large number" (Winograd Report) "Dozens" (Reuven Erlich)
- 76 Lebanese civilians killed in Aynata, Bint Jbeil, and Aytaroun.

The Battle of Bint Jbeil was one of the main battles of the 2006 Lebanon War. Bint Jbeil is a major town of some 20,000 (mainly Shia) inhabitants in Southern Lebanon. Although Brigadier General Gal Hirsch announced on 25 July that the Israel Defense Forces (IDF) had "complete control" of Bint Jbeil, this statement was later discredited. In spite of three sustained attempts by the IDF to conquer the town, it remained in the hands of Hezbollah until the end of the war. The town was the scene of some of the fiercest fighting of the war, with both sides taking heavy losses. Three senior Israeli officers, including Major Roi Klein, were killed in the battle. Hezbollah similarly lost several commanders, most notably Khalid Bazzi, commander of the Bint Jbeil area.

== Background ==
Bint Jbeil was a major center for the Lebanese resistance during the previous 18 years of Israeli occupation. Following Israel's withdrawal from South Lebanon in 2000, the town became an important base for Hezbollah. After the Israeli withdrawal, Hezbollah Secretary General Hassan Nasrallah held his victory speech in Bint Jbeil in front of a jubilant audience of more than 100,000 people (including Muslims and Christians) where he belittled Israeli power:

Barak is today calling on Lebanon to consider the withdrawal as a token of peace. This is treachery. He left having no other option ... Barak still holds our prisoners in his jails, occupies territory dear to us – namely the Shebaa Farms ... every prisoner in Israeli jails will soon, God willing, be back home among you. Barak and his government have no choice: I advice him to leave the Shebaa farms ... he has no other choice ... I tell you: the Israel that owns nuclear weapons and has the strongest air force in the region is weaker than a spider's web.

The spider's web (Arabic: بيت العنكبوت, bayt al-'ankabout). lit. "the house of the spider"), has a special significance in Islam. In Ayah 29:41 of the Quran, the unbelievers' choice of other protectors than God, is compared to the spider's choice of nest: "the weakest nest of all, is the spider's web".

According to Israeli journalist Amir Rapaport, Nasrallah's speech infuriated the IDF Command which over time developed a "cobwebs complex". The 2006 Lebanon war finally presented an opportunity to get even. Senior IDF officers, such as Chief of Staff Dan Halutz and Chief of Operations Gadi Eisenkot claimed that Bint Jbeil was an important "symbol". They hoped to capture the town and bring an Israeli leader to hold a victory speech at the same place where Nasrallah held his speech in 2000. Instead, according to Rapaport, Bint Jbeil would come to symbolize failure.

According to IDF estimates Bint Jbeil and the nearby town of Aynata was defended by 100-140 fighters, about 60 of whom belonged to the local garrison and around 40 belonged to the Hezbollah Special Force. The primary aim of the Hezbollah forces in the string of positions along the border was not to hold territory but to bleed the Israelis and slow down their advance.

== Operation Webs of Steel 2 (23–29 July) ==
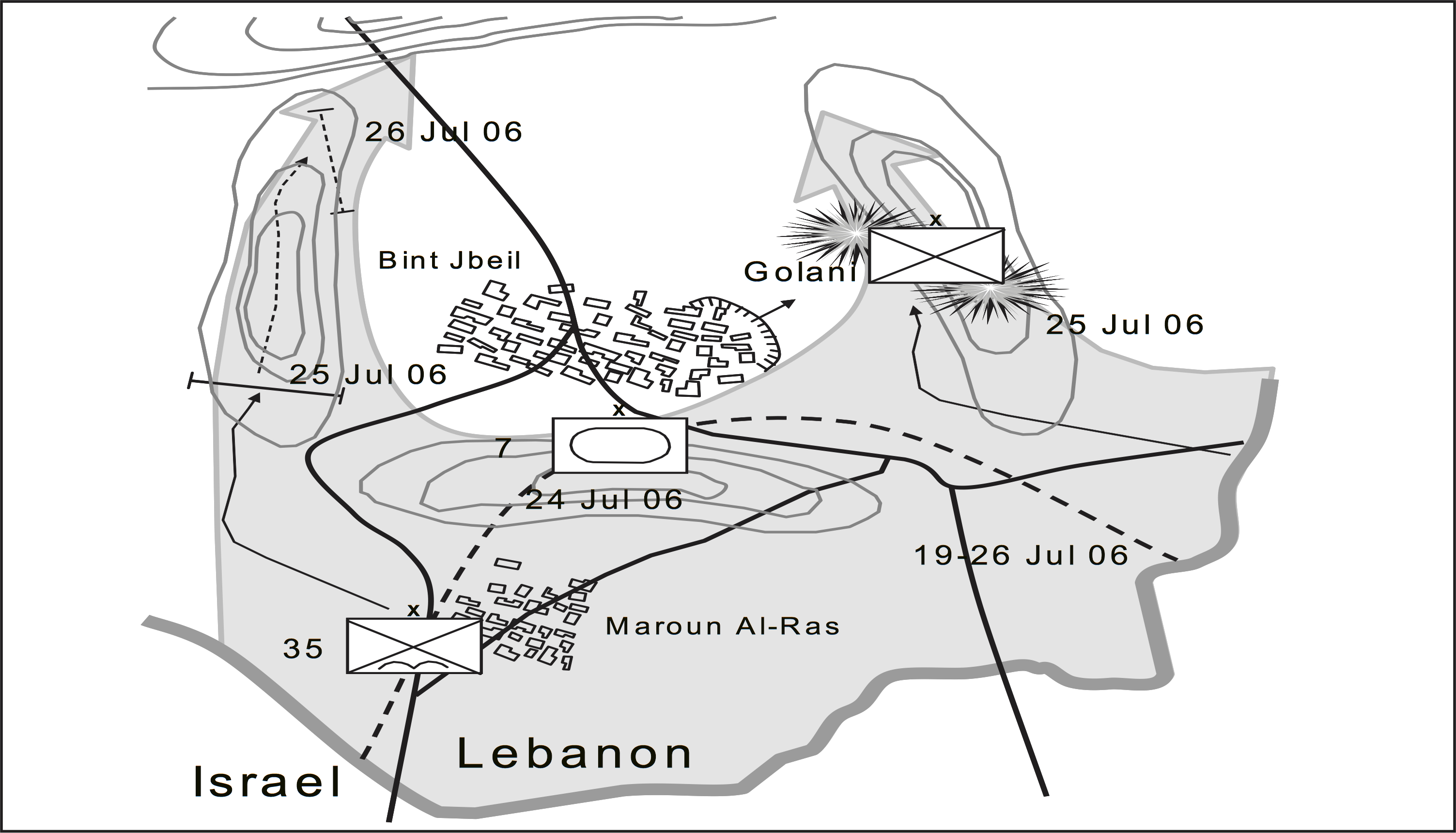
A map of the town, showing the IDF advance over time.

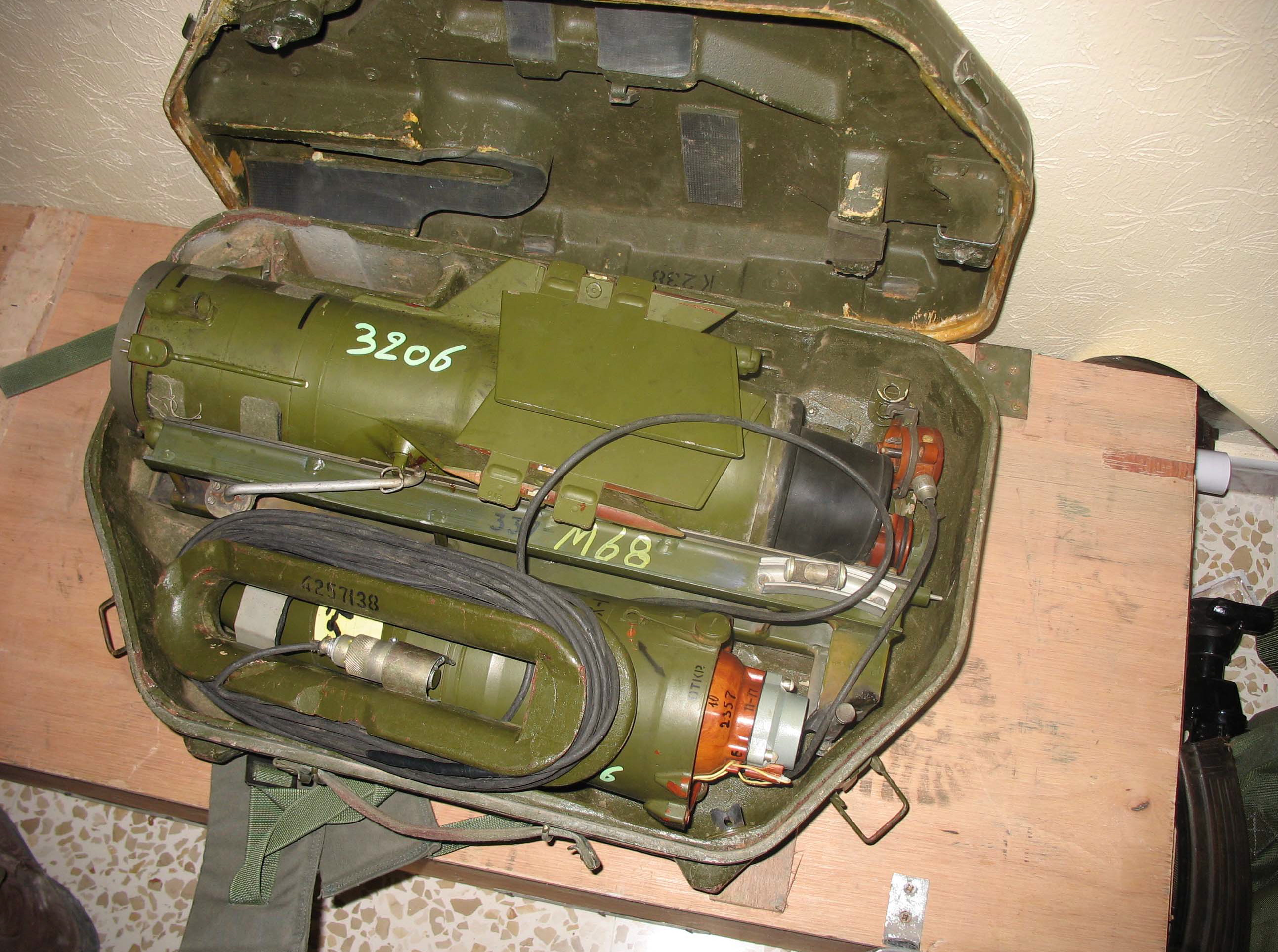
Hezbollah weaponry captured in Bint Jbeil

Initially, Israel had no intention of capturing Bint Jbeil. Rather, the IDF sought to control the city from outside. Brig.-Gen. Shuky Shachrur, the Northern Command's chief of staff, said the plan was to raid specific targets based on intelligence. Brig.-Gen. Gal Hirsch told a Table News Network correspondent that "We can direct precise fire at every point that is needed [within the town] and bring the forces to a situation of minimum risk".

However, as the war went on, the Israeli leadership changed its position on Bint Jbeil. Despite the claims of progress there was "nothing tangible to put on display" to show for it, and a clear victory at Bint Jbeil could well be the watershed in the war. A Hezbollah surrender here was hoped to create a "ripple effect" on the other strongholds in South Lebanon.

The IDF, however, was divided over exactly how to deal with the town. Some proposed an outright occupation of the town while others a more subtle approach, surrounding it and raiding Hezbollah positions in it. Brig.-Gen. Gal Hirsch of the 91st Division wanted to conquer Bint Jbeil, not just to raid it. It was his division headquarters that came up with the name "Operation Webs of Steel" (Hebrew: מבצע קורי פלדה).

The operation was planned as a pincer movement with the Golani Brigade approaching the town from the east and the Paratroopers Brigade from the west. The paratroopers however set out too late and were ordered to halt before reaching their designated positions. Since the painful experiences of the Maglan at Maroun ar-Ras, Israeli forces were not allowed to advance in daylight. The northern side of Bint Jbeil was intentionally left open, apparently to provide an escape route for the town's defenders. Instead, Hezbollah used the opportunity to send in reinforcements to the town. According to the orders issued by the IDF Northern Command on 22 July, the IDF was not to enter Bint Jbeil. The town was to be encircled but not occupied.

The Israeli advance was preceded by a massive artillery bombardment. An IDF artillery officer, Lt.-Col. Avi Mano, claimed that Bint Jbeil had been hit by 3,000 shells by 25 July. According to the officer, IDF cannons could make direct hits on houses and cause "more damage" than Katyusha rockets.

According to Time magazine, over 5,000 Israeli troops participated in the siege of Bint Jbeil by 25 July, while the number of Hezbollah defenders of the town was estimated at "over 100".

The ground battle for Bint Jbeil started on 24 July when Israeli forces approached the nearby town of Aynata from the east and approached the Sadr district. Five members of the Golani Brigade were wounded by friendly fire, and two tanks were sent to evacuate them. The first tank was hit by a missile, killing the platoon commander and wounding two of the crewmen. The second tank, a Merkava IV, ran over a powerful remote-controlled mine and rolled over from the blast. One of the crew was killed and the commander of the 52nd battalion, Lt.-Col. Guy Kabili, as well as his deputy, was wounded. An armor-plated D-9 bulldozer that attempted to rescue the casualties was forced to retreat after being hit by a missile. The wounded were finally evacuated under the cover of a smoke-screen. Altogether the IDF lost 2 killed and 18 wounded in the clashes. Five Hezbollah fighters were also killed during the fighting. One of them, Marwan Samahat, was killed in the clashes in eastern Aynata. Another four fighters were killed in southern Bint Jbeil, near the Maslakh mosque.

An Apache Longbow attack helicopter flying support mission for ground forces at Bint Jbeil crashed on the same day on the Israeli side of the border, killing both pilots. IAF at first believed that the helicopter accidentally was hit by Israeli MLRS artillery fire. Hezbollah claimed to have shot down the helicopter. An IAF crash investigation team later said that the crash was caused by a "rare technical fault". Investigators from Boeing, the helicopter's manufacturer, however, disagree with the IAF's findings. Boeing claims that the technical fault that caused the crash did not originate from the manufacturing process.

By the next day the IDF had taken up positions east, west and south of Bint Jbeil and Aynata but had not yet entered the built-up areas. In spite of this Gen. Hirsch declared victory to the press. "The town is in our control," he declared on 25 July. "The work is almost completed and the terrorists are fleeing." The statement would quickly prove disastrously wrong. An Israeli soldier would later describe his feelings when hearing Hirsch's words over the radio, while being under Sagger missile attack "from every direction" in the town: "you realize something is wrong."

The soldiers of the Golani Brigade's 51st Battalion were ordered to enter Bint Jbeil. They set out from Avivim and after a night-time march over the Maroun ar-Ras hill reached the southern outskirts of Aynata. In the early hours of the morning on 26 July the orders were suddenly changed. Now the battalion was ordered to sweep into Bint Jbeil and conquer it.

The Golani Brigade's commander, Col. Tamir Yedai, did not leave Israeli territory but remote-controlled the battle from kibbutz Malkia, the civilian settlement where the Golani Brigade had established its wartime command post. Because of topographical reasons, he frequently lost contact with his men in Lebanon. Battalion commander Lt.-Col. Yaniv Asor commanded the first company of the 51st battalion, while his deputy, Maj. Roi Klein, commanded the third company. Both companies consisted of approximately 100 soldiers.

The third company walked into a well-prepared ambush in the outskirts of Aynata, the town immediately to the east of Bint Jbeil. Lebanese accounts refer to this battle as "the battle of Aynata" as the Israeli forces had not yet entered Bint Jbeil proper. The olive grove in southern Aynata where the clash occurred was later renamed "Liberation square" (Arabic: مربع التحرير). The southern section of Aynata was defended by two squads [majmu’a]. A Hezbollah squad would normally include 7-10 fighters.

IDF platoon commander Merchavia and two of his men were killed immediately as they entered the olive grove surrounded by high wall. One Hezbollah unit attacked the Israeli force in the grove while a second unit fired at the reinforcements from positions in the upper stories of buildings with small arms and anti-tank rockets. Most of the soldiers from the platoon that entered the olive grove were eventually killed or wounded.

The battalion's deputy commander, Major Roi Klein was seriously wounded when he reportedly covered a hand grenade with his body to save his troops. The only soldier who witnessed the episode, Sgt. Shimon Adega, was killed shortly afterward. Klein was later killed by a second grenade. Then the company commander was injured and his deputy was killed. Lt. Itamar Katz, who did not know the names of his men, took over command. 25 immobile wounded lay in the orchard screaming for help. The men were defended for several hours almost single-handed by a lone fighter, Shiran Amsilli. The 51st battalion seemed to be on the verge of breaking.

The battalion did not break but the fighting changed drastically from an offensive military operation to a rescue mission. The IDF sent in reinforcements to provide covering fire while the casualties were evacuated. The troops that arrived as reinforcements suffered lower casualties compared to the first wave. Soldiers often risked their lives not only to save the wounded, but to recover the dead and prevent Hezbollah fighters from reaching their bodies. Combat continued for several hours, and was often conducted at point-blank range. The wounded were carried three kilometers to a place where helicopters could land under the protection of smoke grenades and heavy artillery fire, and soldiers often simultaneously shot at enemy fighters while carrying stretchers. Finally, Israeli Air Force Blackhawk helicopters managed to land under heavy fire and fly the wounded to Rambam Medical Center in Haifa. The commanders decided not to risk pilots to evacuate the dead; they were carried out under cover of darkness by a company from the Golani Brigade's 12th Battalion."

After evacuating their dead and wounded, the Israelis withdrew from their positions in Aynata, claiming to have "completed operations".

The 51st battalion suffered 8 dead, including three officers, and 22 wounded in the fighting in Aynata. The 12th battalion had another five wounded. On the same day an anti-tank missile fired from Bint Jbeil, hit a paratrooper position in nearby Maroun al-Ras and one officer was killed and three soldiers were wounded. Hezbollah also suffered casualties in the battle. The IDF released widely different estimates of the number of Hezbollah killed in the battle, from 15 or "at least 20" to "at least 40" or "close to 50" The Lebanese daily as-Safir, which was sympathetic to Hezbollah, wrote a year later that only four Hezbollah fighters died in the clash in the olive grove, and named them as Amir Fadlallah, Ali as-Sayid, Mahmoud Khanafir and Atif al-Mousawi.

The following night Israeli paratroopers infiltrated Bint Jbeil from the west and took up positions in a number of large villas in the Talat Mas’ud neighborhood overlooking the town. Sporadic clashes continued over the next days.

The IDF claimed that the paratroopers took part in a major engagement on 29 July. According to the commander of the paratroopers, the fighting began when two Hezbollah fighters were killed while approaching a building occupied by the paratroopers. Then, at least seven Hezbollah cells attacked the soldiers, employing anti-tank rockets and RPGs. The paratroopers repulsed the attack, and received air support during the battle. The paratrooper commander claimed that "our forces were well prepared and gunned down cell after cell. We saw them falling". The IDF claimed that 20 or 26 Hezbollah fighters were killed, and put its own casualties at 6 wounded, one of them seriously.

Lebanese accounts of the battle do not mention this clash and do not confirm any Hezbollah casualties in Bint Jbeil on this date. Lebanese daily as-Safir reported that a Hezbollah reconnaissance squad attacked IDF positions in Tallat Mas’oud on 28 July, prompting an overnight Israeli withdrawal from the district.

Also on 29 July, two Hezbollah commanders and a third fighter who was accompanying them were killed in an Israeli airstrike in the Old City of Bint Jbeil. The house they were occupying collapsed after being bombed, killing all three of them. The two commanders were identified as Khalid Bazzi (al-Hajj Qasim) and Muhammad Abu Ta'am. Bazzi was chief of operations in the Bint Jbeil area, including Maroun al-Ras, Aynata, Aytaroun and Bint Jbeil, while Abu Ta'am was responsible for the town itself. Both had taken part in the abduction of the two Israeli soldiers that had started the war.

There are suggestions that Bazzi earlier had refused to obey orders to withdraw from the town saying that he would "only leave as a martyr". Hezbollah commanders who spoke to Lebanese al-Akhbar a year after the war did not confirm this version of events. According to them the proper place for a commander was with his fighters on the battlefield. Bazzi and Abu Ta'am however were criticized for violating military regulations by being at the same place during a battle. The IDF had earlier claimed that Bazzi was killed in Maroun al-Ras several days earlier. Bazzi was succeeded by Muhammad Qanso (Sajid ad-Duwayr), a special forces commander who in turn would be killed by an Israeli airstrike near Beit Yahoun 13 days later.

On the same day, the IDF pulled its troops from Bint Jbeil, but armored units continued to operate around the town.

== Respite ==
On 30 July Israel launched an airstrike on a civilian building in the town of Qana, to the north of Bint Jbeil, in which 28 Lebanese civilians were killed, including 16 children. Under American pressure Israel declared a two-day suspension of air strikes on targets in southern Lebanon. Israel also agreed to allow a 24-hour “window” where the United Nations could assist locals who wanted to leave southern Lebanon. Hezbollah reciprocated and suspended all its rocket attacks on northern Israel.

After 19 days of continuous shelling Bint Jbeil at last experienced a lull in the fighting. Large sections of the town had been reduced to rubble and hundreds of survivors, mainly the old and infirm who had been unable to escape from the battlefield, emerged from the ruins. A convoy of ambulances from the Lebanese Red Cross arrived at the town and began evacuating the civilians. The United Nations and Hezbollah fighters also assisted in the evacuation of civilians.

The Salah Ghandour hospital was the only hospital in the area and had been hit several times by Israeli shells. It had no fuel for its generators and was finally abandoned during the pause in the fighting. Fouad Taha, the hospital's director and only remaining physician, and the other staff helped in the evacuation of the remaining civilians before leaving the town. He had survived a direct hit on his night quarters. "We're feeling guilty leaving people behind," he said.

== Operation Change of Direction 8 and 9 (1–9 August) ==
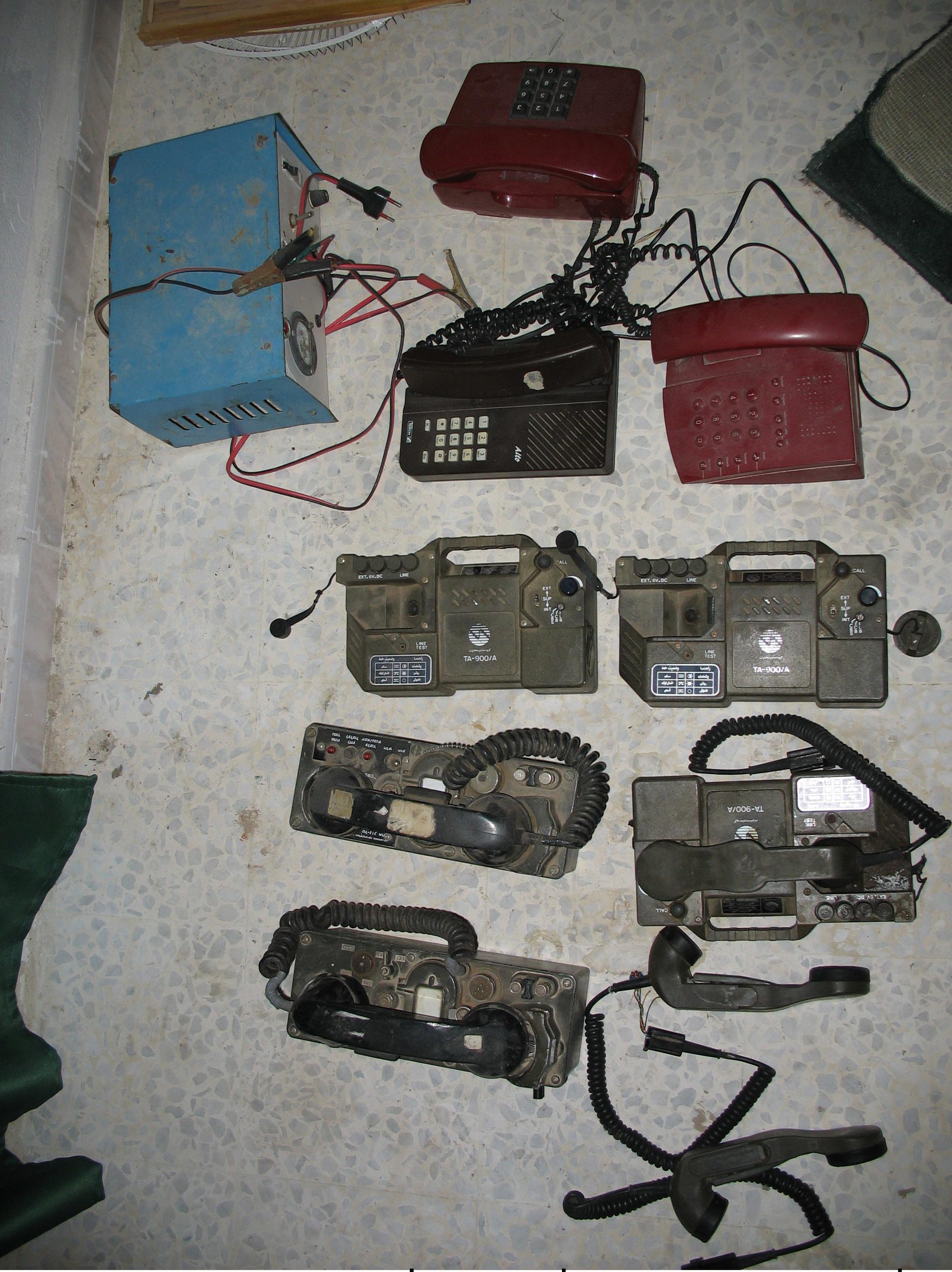
Hezbollah communication devices captured in Bint Jbeil

According to the Winograd report there were ground battles in Bint Jbeil during Operation Change of Direction 8 (1–3 August) but it gives no details. There are no other reports confirming any serious fighting in Bint Jbeil, or of any Israeli casualties, during this period. Lebanese sources claim that "what appeared to be a truce" (hudna) was observed from 29 July until 7 August, when Operation Change of Direction 10 was launched.

In the beginning of August discussions were held at IDF command about what to do about Bint Jbeil. Chief of Staff Halutz decided to occupy the remaining pockets of resistance close to the border; Bint Jbeil, Ayta ash-Sha’b and Mays al-Jabal. This time Bint Jbeil would be effectively surrounded and attacked simultaneously from all sides. The operation was to be completed by 8 August.

On the evening of 6 August, the battle began again. The Israeli advance into Bint Jbeil was slow. The following day a paratrooper was killed and four others were wounded in a clash that lasted several hours. Two Israeli tank crew members, including a senior officer, were killed and two others injured when their tank was hit by an anti-tank missile. The IDF claimed that five Hezbollah soldiers were also killed during the clash.

=== The battle of the flag ===
A column of tanks was ordered to occupy the former Israeli headquarters building in Saff al-Hawa neighborhood in the northern outskirts of the town, close to the place where Nasrallah held his "cobweb" speech in 2000. Paratrooper Brigade commander Hagai Mordechai was commissioned the task of hoisting the Israeli flag on this building. Thus began the so-called "Battle of the Flag".

At the entrance to Bint Jbeil stood a large ten-story building, later nicknamed "the Monster" by Israeli soldiers, where about ten Hezbollah fighters had taken up positions, preventing further Israeli advance. A heavy exchange of fire ensued, and the Israelis were reluctant to call in an airstrike because of its proximity to the Salih Ghandour hospital. Although it was assumed to be vacant, Israel did not want to risk a repetition of the disastrous mistake of the airstrike in Qana. While advancing on the building an Israeli soldier was critically wounded in a suspected friendly fire incident. It was clear that the soldier would not survive unless he could be taken to hospital. The wounded soldier was evacuated in a dramatic rescue operation but died in the helicopter before reaching the hospital. Another soldier was killed in the rescue operation. The Israeli Air Force eventually bombed the building, causing it to collapse. According to the IDF, at least four Hezbollah fighters were also killed.

Mordechai told his deputy to "take the flag, put it on the building where [the Israeli] forces are, take pictures and leave. No one should die for this picture.” The flag was raised on a different building than intended and a photograph taken (reproduced here). In the end, the IDF decided not to publish the picture. By the time it was ready to be distributed, it had become irrelevant. The IDF had already begun to withdraw from the town.

On the same day Chief of Operation Gadi Eisenkot had to inform the Israeli cabinet that the army had not occupied Bint Jbeil and some other localities close to the border. Hezbollah managed to hold its positions in the town throughout the war. In the last days of the war the fighting was concentrated to areas north of the town and there were no reports of heavy fighting in the town itself.

== Operation Change of Direction 11 (10-12 August) ==
Less than three days before the ceasefire, Operation Changing Direction 11 was launched with the aim of pushing further into Lebanese territory. 17 Israeli soldiers died in the fighting around the villages of Hadatha, Yatar, at-Tiri, Rashaf and Ayta az-Zut, to the north of Bint Jbeil. The overall commander of the Bint Jbeil region, Muhammad Qanso (Sajid ad-Duwayr), from the village of ad-Duwayr, was killed on 11 August. He was severely wounded in an Israeli airstrike outside the village of Beit Yahoun, some five kilometers north of Bint Jbeil and later succumbed to his wounds. In spite of the fact that the IDF was ordered once again to capture Bint Jbeil, there are no reports of any offensive Israeli action against Hezbollah positions in the town itself.

A New York Times correspondent accompanied a platoon from the Golani 51st Battalion, that had previously suffered heavy casualties in the battle of Bint Jbeil. The unit occupied an unfinished building in the Bint Jbeil area. A Merkava tank was hit by a Kornet missile wounding two soldiers. After the top floor of the house was hit by a missile strike the IDF soldiers took shelter in the most secure part of the building, the first floor bathroom, and remained there for 36 hours. The experience two weeks earlier made the Golani soldiers wary of casualties.

In the last hours before the ceasefire came into effect, Lieutenant Adam Kima was ordered to clear a road going westward out of Bint Jbeil. Kima refused to obey orders, claiming a high risk of being exposed to Hezbollah ambushes. The officer and five of his soldiers were arrested and sentenced to prison for 2–3 weeks (though released early).

By the beginning of September, Israeli forces had withdrawn from the area of Bint Jbeil and control was transferred to the Lebanese army and United Nations peacekeeping forces.

Some have commented that this battle had a psychological component outweighing its military significance. Uri Bar-Joseph wrote about Dan Halutz in Haaretz "He pushed for ineffectual military initiatives with a high casualty toll, like the conquest of Bint Jbail, which was meant to create a spectacle of victory in the place where Nasrallah delivered his "spider web" speech following the IDF pullout in May 2000."

== The battle of the bodies ==
IDF has a long standing policy of not leaving wounded or dead fighters on the battle field and would at times go to great lengths to retrieve them. At the same time Israel has maintained a policy of not returning to families for burial the remains of killed fighters that had engaged in "hostile terrorist activity". Instead they are buried in fenced-off so called "cemeteries for enemy dead", maintained by IDF military rabbinate, in what the Israeli human rights organization B'Tselem considers a "demeaning and shameful manner".

This policy was particularly pronounced in the 2006 Lebanon war and would have a profound effect on the conduct of the war. IDF Chief of Staff Halutz repeatedly ordered Israeli troops during the war to capture Hezbollah bodies "to show to the media". During the war, Israel also released footage to Fox News of the slain Hezbollah fighter Hadi Hasrallah, the 18-year-old son of Hezbollah Secretary General Hassan Nasrallah, killed in a clash in south Lebanon 1997 and whose body was retained by Israel. His remains were returned to Lebanon in an exchange in 1998.

Brig. Gen. Gal Hirsch, commander of Division 91, declared on 25 July that IDF "planned to take several bodies of dead guerrillas captive" in the battle of Bint Jbeil. In the first week of August Israel claimed to have captured five Hezbollah operatives in the vicinity of Bint Jbeil. In fact IDF only captured four Hezbollah fighters throughout the war and none in the Bint Jbeil region. The bodies of at least three Hezbollah fighters, who were killed in the battle of Bint Jbeil, were captured by IDF and brought to Israel. The remains of Mousa Khanafir, Zayd Haydar and Marwan Samahat were returned to Lebanon in the prisoner exchange on 15 July 2008.

Veteran Israeli war correspondent Ron Ben-Yishai claimed that "in almost any ground battle, the moment our troops encountered resistance, the force's progress stopped, commanders demanded assistance, and the fighting focused on evacuating casualties from the battlefield... you will not find even one story about a force that fought until it completed its mission or a Hezbollah force that was defeated."

Although the IDF did not conquer Bint Jbeil, they fought hard and succeeded in preventing their comrades' bodies from falling into Hezbollah's hands.

== Aftermath ==
Israel sent the elite of its regular forces, the Golani infantry brigade and the Paratroopers brigade to Bint Jbeil. The IDF enjoyed a tremendous superiority both in numbers and firepower as well as absolute air superiority. The over 5,000 IDF soldiers laying a siege around the town were faced by little more than 100 Hezbollah fighters. The IDF failed to conquer the town or to make any other tangible operational achievements. According to Kober the Israeli withdrawal was "correctly interpreted by Hizballah as a great victory for the organization".

The Winograd Commission devoted a special chapter to the battle of Bint Jbeil and especially to the deadly clash on 26 July. The commission concluded that what was described as a "division-sized battle" was in reality no more than a "series of limited engagements between IDF forces and Hezbollah fighters on the eastern edge, and to some extent on the western edge of the town." According to the report the failure capture Bint Jbeil became "a symbol of the unsuccessful action of the Israel Defense Forces throughout the fighting."

The Israeli leaders primarily responsible for the conduct of the war, Prime minister Olmert, Defense minister Peretz and Chief of Staff Halutz, were all in agreement in their testimony to the Winograd Commission. The 2006 Lebanon War would have been a "clear achievement for Israel had the initial limited ground operations in Maroun ar-Ras and Bint Jbeil been successful".

Hezbollah considered the battle of Bint Jbeil a remarkable victory. The IDF forces participating in the battle were vastly superior, both in terms of numbers and of firepower. According to Israeli estimates the towns were only defended by a company-sized force (100–140 men) and yet Hezbollah fighters succeeded in holding four IDF brigades at bay. Hezbollah commanders later estimated that they were outnumbered 10 or 20 to one in the battles. The IDF often released conflicting estimates of the number of Hezbollah fighters killed in the various clashes during the war. No overall estimate was published after the war. A semi-official Israeli study claimed that "dozens" of Hezbollah operatives were killed in the battle. The Winograd Commission only claimed that "a large number" were killed. Hezbollah has yet to publish official casualty statistics from the battle or indeed from the war itself. It is clear however that dozens of Hezbollah fighters died in the battle. Local Hezbollah commanders told Lebanese Daily as-Safir that Bint Jbeil lost 18 fighters while Aynata lost 14 in the battle. Among those killed were several commanders, including Khalid Bazzi, the overall Hezbollah commander of the Bint Jbeil area. A Hezbollah commander told as-Safir that most of the fighters who died in the battle were killed by the shelling while only a "small number" died in the clashes with Israeli troops. Hezbollah usually dominated the battle field "because of the courage of the fighter, their steadfastness and knowledge of the terrain". But the total number of fatalities in the battles in the Bint Jbeil area (including the Battle of Maroun al-Ras) could well be higher than 32. Hezbollah sent reinforcements to the town during the war, including 40 members of the elite Special Forces unit.

The Israeli army's failure in the war in general and especially its inability to conquer Bint Jbeil generated bitterness in Israel. The war had not ended before the recriminations inside the IDF Command started flying. The commander of the 7th Brigade, Col. Amnon Eshel was caught by a TV camera saying that his superior officer Brig. Gen. Gal Hirsch "does not understand what is going on on the battlefield", a statement that probably ended his military career. Hirsch shot back, accusing Eshel of never once entering Lebanon himself, only watching the war from his "plasma screen" in his HQ in Israel.

Former Chief of Staff Moshe Yaalon's criticism of the Israeli conduct of the war was scathing, calling it a "catastrophe". Aware of the seriousness of the antitank threat, he says that the IDF should have left the vulnerable tanks at home and stayed away from built-up areas – "no tanks and no houses" – and to operate in a more guerrilla like type of warfare. He was especially critical of the attempted occupation of Bint Jbeil.

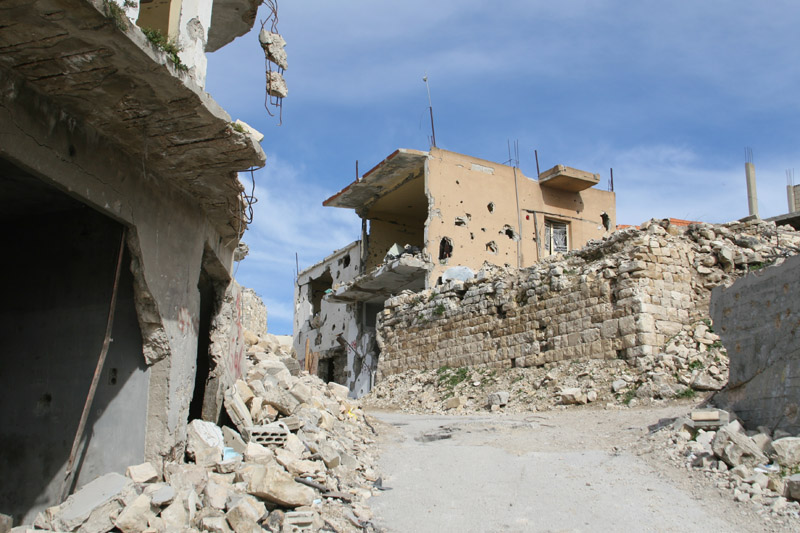
Center of Bint Jbeil after the war

Walking through Bint Jbeil in February 2007

Commander of Northern Command Udi Adam was practically dismissed on 8 August 2006 - after his failure to capture Bint Jbeil - when the Chief of Staff Dan Halutz sent his deputy, Moshe Kaplinsky, to serve as a "coordinator" at Northern Command. Adam resigned from the army a month after the war. The Chief of Staff himself resigned from his post in January 2007 and his deputy Kaplinsky retired from the army in late 2007. Gen. Hirsch became the prime target for the widespread frustration in Israel after the war, having direct responsibility both for the abduction affair and the failures at Bint Jbeil and Ayta ash-Sha'b. He was forced to resign a few months after the war.

After his resignation, former Chief of Staff Halutz said that "the most blatant non-achievement or failure" of the war was allowing it to continue for so long. If the initial battles at Maroun al-Ras and Bint Jbeil had been more successful the final ground operation could have been avoided. "We could have achieved a lot more if we had been more determined,” he said.

Israel's Prime Minister Ehud Olmert was very disappointed at the army's lack of "results" in Bint Jbeil but did not question the courage of the Israeli soldiers. "If Maroun al-Ras had looked different, if Bint Jbail had looked different, it could be that we would not have reached the point we reached."

The 51st Golani Battalion was left scarred by the traumatic experience in Bint Jbeil. Battalion 51 has a dark history in Lebanon, losing 9 men in three days in two incidents in October 1997. In the 2006 war it suffered 8 dead, including several officers, and 20 wounded. Many of the survivors suffered from shell-shock or post traumatic stress syndrome. Five years later some would still suffer from concentration problems, nightmares and impatience or finding it difficult to cope with their daily lives. Soldiers complained that their mental needs were ignored by their officers. Their battalion commander, Lt.-Col. Asor, was appointed commander on the Egoz unit. He was replaced by an officer from outside the Golani Brigade, who had no understanding for old Golani traditions. When the battalion commander did not show up at a memorial service for the eight Golani dead from the Lebanon war a rebellion broke out. About a hundred soldiers rose up and walked out of the Tze'elim training base outside Beer Sheva. This was one of the largest "revolts" in the history of the IDF. One of the leaders of the "Golani rebellion" was St.-Sgt. Shiran Amsili, the hero from the clash in the olive grove who received a medal for his part in the battle. He was sent to jail for two months for his involvement in the protest. Another 10 soldiers were sent to jail for one or two months and seven other soldiers were confined to their base for a month.

== Civilian casualties ==
According to a book review in Haaretz, Chief of Staff Dan Halutz at one time demanded that air attacks on Bint Jbeil be escalated "in order to wipe out Bint Jbail from the air", but the demand was rejected by the defence minister. The town was, however, subjected to intensive artillery shelling throughout the war and the destruction of buildings and other civilian infrastructure was widespread. Israeli journalist Ron Ben Yishai visited Bint Jbeil after the war and observed that "only several houses in the big town are still standing." According to data from UNDP 2,512 housing units in the Bint Jbeil district were destroyed and another 1,908 were damaged. Fully 14,799 buildings were "impacted", representing 87 percent of all buildings in the district.

According to Lebanese sources 27 civilians were killed in Aynata while 18 civilians were killed in Bint Jbeil. and 41 civilians were killed in Aytaroun. The Lebanese Government prepared a report for the UN Human Rights Council about what it termed "collective massacres" committed by the Israeli army in the 2006 war. The list contained three incidents concerning what the Lebanese government called civilian victims in the village of Aytaroun:

- 12 July: Houses of Ali and Hassan Al-Akhrass (11 killed)
- 17 July: Houses of Mohammed and Hassan Awada (13 killed)
- 19 July: Convoy fleeing village (4 killed)

== Battle of Bint Jbeil (2026) ==
During the 2026 Lebanon war, Israeli forces captured the town of Bint Jbeil. It conducted destruction operations within the town, including the stadium where Hassan Nasrallah made his "spider web" speech. Israeli brigadier Guy Levy commenting: "Someone here spoke and boasted about webs and spiders [...] Today, that man no longer exists, the stadium is gone, and his words are worth nothing".

== Combat fatalities ==
=== Israeli fatalities ===
24 July 2006

- Col. Tzvi Luft (Helicopter pilot), 42, of Hogla
- 1st Lt. Tom Farkash (Helicopter pilot), 23, of Caesarea
- 2nd Lt. Lotan Slavin (Bat. 52 of the 401st Armored Brigade), 21, of Hatzeva
- St.-Sgt. Kobi Smileg (Bat. 52 of the 401st Armored Brigade), 20, of Rehovot

26 July 2006

- Maj. Roi Klein (Bat. 51 of the Golani Brigade), 31, of Eli
- Lt. Amihai Merhavia (Bat. 51 of the Golani Brigade), 24, of Eli
- Lt. Alexander Shwartzman (Bat. 51 of the Golani Brigade), 24, of Akko
- Sgt. Shimon Adega (Bat. 51 of the Golani Brigade), 21, of Kiryat Gat
- St.-Sgt. Idan Cohen (Bat. 51 of the Golani Brigade), 21, of Tel Aviv
- St.-Sgt. Shimon Dahan (Bat. 51 of the Golani Brigade), 20, of Ashdod
- Cpl. Ohad Klausner (Bat. 51 of the Golani Brigade), 20, of Bet Horon
- Cpl. Assaf Namer, 27 (Bat. 51 of the Golani Brigade), of Kiryat Yam

7 August 2006

- Maj.(res.) Yotam Lotan (847th Armoured Brigade), 33, of Beit Hashita
- St.-Sgt.(res.) Noam Meirson (847th Armoured Brigade), 23, of Jerusalem
- St.-Sgt. Moshe (Malko) Ambao (Paratroopers), 22, of Lod

8 August 2006

- St.-Sgt. Oren Lifschitz (Paratroopers Recon. Bat.), 21, of Gazit
- St.-Sgt. Moran Cohen (Paratroopers Recon. Bat.), 21, of Ashdot Ya'akov

=== Hezbollah fatalities ===
Hizbullah has not published a list of casualties from the battle of Bint Jbeil. The following lists refer to Bint Jbeil and Aynata locals who died as Hizbullah fighters in the 2006 Lebanon war. Some of them may not have died in the battle of Bint Jbeil. Some Bint Jbeil locals died elsewhere in South Lebanon, especially in the Battle of Maroun al-Ras. Commander Rani Bazzi, who participated in the battle of Bint Jbeil, left the area when the IDF withdrew and fell in the Battle of al-Ghandouriya.

Bint Jbeil

- Commander Khalid Ahmad Bazzi
- Commander Rani Adnan Bazzi
- Commander Muhammad Abu Ta'am
- Hassan Qasim Hamid
- Ali Adil as-Saghir
- Qasim Muhammad Baydoun
- Muhammad Hani Shararah
- Hisham Muhammad Bazzi
- as-Sayid Mahmoud as-Sayid Ahmad
- Ahmad Qasim Hamid
- as-Sayid Husein Imad Jum'ah
- Kifah Fayiz Shararah
- Hasan Fayiz as-Saghir
- Nidal Mahmoud Dahir
- Mahmoud Ahmad Khazim
- Ali Abu Aliwi
- as-Sayid Ali Jum'ah
- Ali Husein al-Wizwaz
- Bilal Ali Harish
- Kifah Mahmoud Asaili

Aynata

- as-Sayid Zayd Mahmoud Haydar
- Mousa Yousuf Khaz’al
- Nazim Abdul-Nabi Nasrallah
- Muhammad Hassan Samahat
- Hassan Ismail Mustafa
- al-Hajj Mahmud Dheeb Khanafir
- as-Sayid Amir Ibrahim Fadlallah
- as-Sayid Ali Muhammad as-Sayid Ali
- Shakir Najib Ghanam
- Marwan Husain Samahat
- Jamil Mahmoud an-Nimr
- Kazim Ali Khanafir
- Mahir Muhammad Sayf ad-Din
- Ammar Habib Qawsan

== See also ==
- Khalid Bazzi
- Roi Klein

== Sources ==
- Arkin, William M. (July 2007). "Divining Victory: Airpower in the 2006 Israel-Hezbollah War" (PDF). Maxwell Air Force Base, Alabama: Air University Press. Archived from the original (PDF) on 13 June 2019.
- Cambanis, Thanassis, A Privilege to Die, Inside Hezbollah's Legions and Their Endless War Against Israel, Free Press, New York, 2010
- Crooke, Alastair and Mark Perry, HOW HEZBOLLAH DEFEATED ISRAEL, Asia Times

PART 1: Winning the intelligence war, 12 October 2006
PART 2: Winning the ground war, 13 October 2006
PART 3: The political war, 14 October 2006

- Erlich, Dr. Reuven (Col. Ret.), "Hezbollah's use of Lebanese civilians as human shields", Intelligence and Terrorism Information Center at the Center for Special Studies (C.S.S), November 2006. [The study was supported by Military Intelligence, the Operations Division of the IDF General Staff, the IDF Spokesperson and the legal experts of the IDF and the Ministry of Foreign Affairs.]
- Exum, Andrew, "Hizballah at War – A Military Assessment", Washington Institute for Near East Policy, Policy Focus No. 63 | December 2006
- Harel, Amos; Issacharoff, Avi (2008). 34 Days: Israel, Hezbollah, and the War in Lebanon. New York: Palgrave Macmillan.
- Human Rights Watch (September 2007). Why They Died: Civilian Casualties in Lebanon during the 2006 War (PDF) (Report). Human Rights Watch.
- Flooding South Lebanon: Israel's Use of Cluster Munitions in Lebanon in July and August 2006 (PDF) (Report). Human Rights Watch. February 2008.
- Kober, Avi (2008). The Israel Defense Forces in the Second Lebanon War: Why the Poor Performance?. The Journal of Strategic Studies Vol. 31, No. 1, 3 – 40.
- Lubotzky, Asael, from the book From the Wilderness and Lebanon, Yediot Books, 2008

מבצע "קורי פלדה" – בינת ג'ביל (Operation Webs of Steel – Bint Jbeil), (Hebrew)
Chapter 1 - The days preceding the War
Chapter 2 - Lebanon
Chapter 3 - Recovery and Consolation of Mourners

- Noe, Nicholas, Voice of Hezbollah, the statements of Sayed Hassan Nasrallah, Verso, London and New York, 2007.
- Rapaport, Amir: Friendly Fire, How We Failed Ourselves in the Second Lebanon War (עמיר רפפורט, "אש על כוחותינו: כך הכשלנו את עצמנו במלחמת לבנון השנייה"), Sifriya Ma'ariv (2007).

Chapter 1: We have to stop this, (English)
Chapter 15: Go in, Kill Some Terrorists, Get out, (English)
Chapter 23: The battle of the flag (הקרב על הדגל), (Hebrew)

- Lubotzky, Asael, From the Wilderness and Lebanon, Koren Publishers Jerusalem, 2016
- Matthews, Matt M., "We Were Caught Unprepared: The 2006 Hezbollah-Israeli War", The Long War Series Occasional Paper 26, U.S. Army Combined Arms Center Combat Studies Institute Press Fort Leavenworth, Kansas, 2006
- The final Winograd Commission report (Hebrew)
