= Bint Jbeil =

Bint Jbeil بنت جبيل
- Municipality
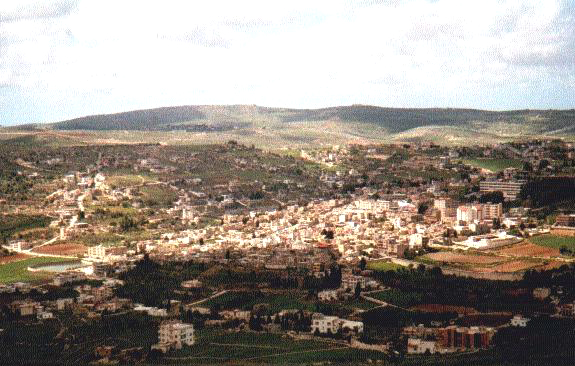
- Bint Jbeil in 2002

- Location within Lebanon
- Coordinates: 33°07′15″N 35°26′1″E
- Grid position: 190/280 PAL
- Country: Lebanon
- Governorate: Nabatieh Governorate
- District: Bint Jbeil

Area
  - Total: 9.10 km^{2} (3.51 sq mi)
- Elevation: 700 m (2,300 ft)

Population
  - Estimate (2001): 30,000

Bint Jbeil (Arabic: بنت جبيل, romanized: Bint Jubayl, lit. 'daughter of (the) little mountain / Byblos'; Levantine Arabic pronunciation: [bɪnt ʒbeːl]) is a depopulated municipality that was the second largest municipality in the Nabatiye Governorate in Southern Lebanon before 2026.

In 2001 the town's population was estimated at 30,000, with the exact population unknown because Lebanon had not conducted a population census since 1932. The Shi'ite town was a major Hezbollah stronghold from 2000 to 2026, when it was depopulated and heavily damaged in a battle between Hezbollah and Israel, and then subsequently occupied and destroyed by Israel.

== History ==
=== Ancient history ===
The Phoenician origin of the towns' name suggest it dates back to that period. The name itself has several meanings as the word Bint in Arabic means Daughter. Therefore it could be "daughter of the mountain". In the town, there is evidence from the Roman and Byzantine period, as seen in temple ruins, columns and houses.

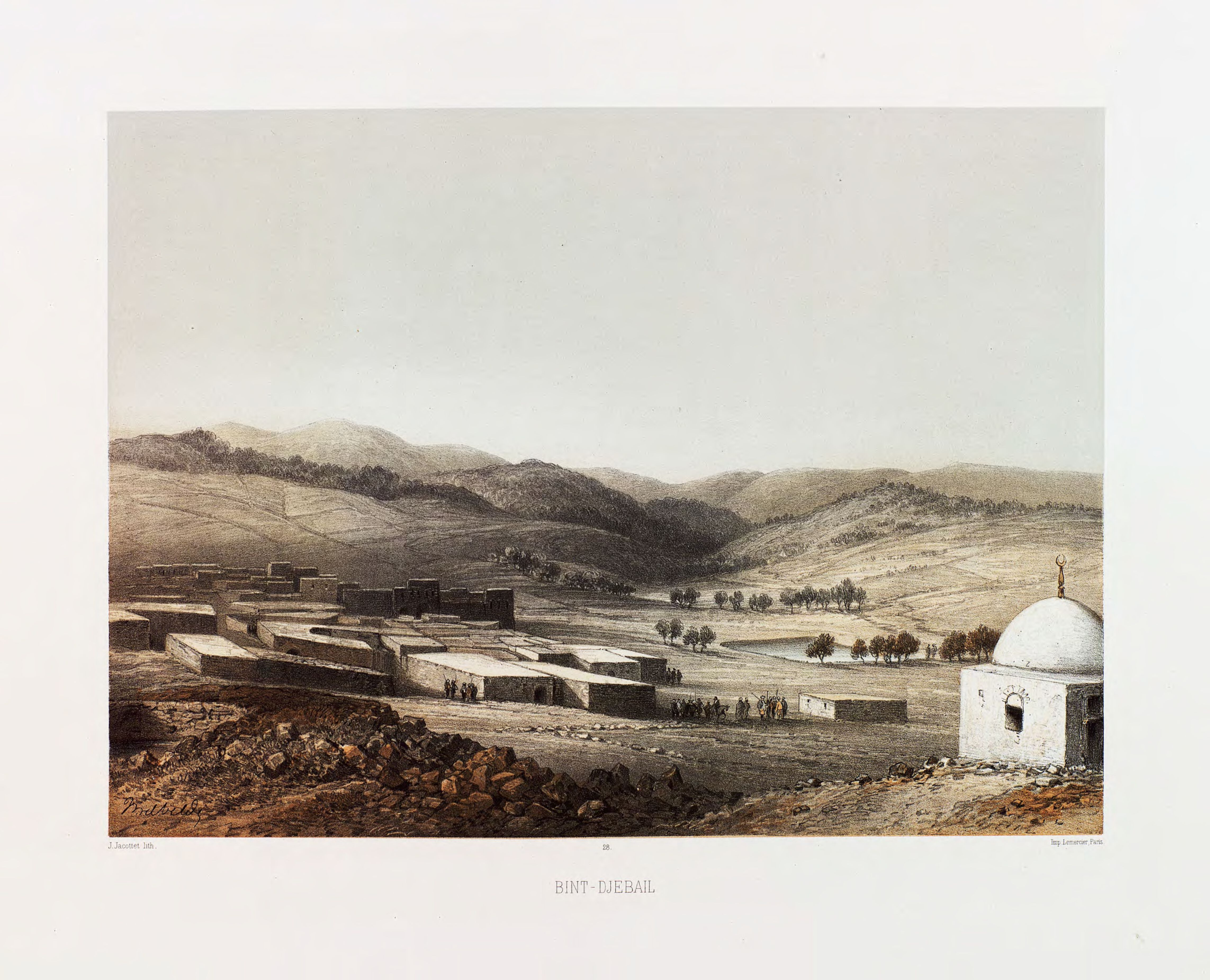
Bint Jbeil in the early 1850s, by van de Velde

==== Ottoman era ====
Ottoman rule in Jabal Amel, which lasted from 1516 to 1918, was often harsh, marked by heavy taxation, periodic military repression of the local Shiʿa communities, and punishment of revolts that disrupted everyday life and stability.

In 1596, it was named as a village, "Bint Jubayl" in the Ottoman nahiya (subdistrict) of Tibnin under the liwa' (district) of Safad, with a population of 238 households and 60 bachelors, all Muslim. The villagers paid taxes on agricultural products, such as wheat, barley, olive trees, fruit trees, goats and beehives, in addition to "occasional revenues", a press for olive oil or grape syrup, and a fixed sum; a total of 25,220 akçe.

In 1838 Edward Robinson noted it as a large Shia village.

In 1875, Victor Guérin found it to be a village with one thousand Metualis, spread over a low hill and into a valley, with many recently rebuilt houses. He notes that its inhabitants draw water from a well, several ancient cisterns, and two large reservoirs used for animals, and observes around one of these basins scattered stones, including finely cut blocks from a ruined structure and the decorated lid of a broken sarcophagus. He concluded that the village stands on the site of a former Jewish settlement whose original name has been lost.

In 1881, the PEF's Survey of Western Palestine (SWP) described it: "A very large Metawileh village, containing about 1,100 to 1,500 Metawileh. A market is held here every Thursday. The village is well built, and has a mosque. The situation is surrounded by higher hills, though the village is on high ground. The cultivation around is grapes, olives, and arable land. Water is supplied from a spring and many cisterns and large birket."

=== French Mandate ===
During the turbulent transition to the French Mandate in the spring of 1920, Bint Jbeil emerged as a central stronghold for the anti-French Jabal Amil revolt. On May 5, 1920—coinciding directly with the fatal assault on the neighboring Christian village of Ain Ebel—armed Shia Muslim irregulars overran the Christian quarter of Bint Jbeil. The resident Melkite Greek Catholic and Maronite Christian families, who had formed a long-standing segment of the town's population, were forcibly expelled from the municipality. This targeted displacement was executed by insurgent leaders to secure Bint Jbeil as the uncontested political and military capital of the regional insurrection, ensuring an internally cohesive base of operations against arriving French colonial forces.

In the 1930s, Bint Jbeil was a major tobacco-producing town with an educated populace. The town and its vicinity produced around 40,000 kilograms a year by 1936.

During the wider 1936 labor strikes and nationalist protests across the Levant, French authorities sought to suppress burgeoning independence movements in the South. In 1936, the tobacco revolt against French rule broke out in Bint Jbeil following the killing of three protesters by gendarmes. The town, politically divided between the pro-French Bazzi landowners and Beydoun merchants, was a significant tobacco producer in Lebanon. The revolt was led by young 'Amili intellectuals disillusioned with both traditional leadership and French Mandate policies. Key figures included Musa al-Zayn Sharara, who later became the town's mayor, and 'Abd al-Husayn al-Abdallah. These leaders, representing a new generation educated in Najaf, were critical of the traditional leadership and their pro-Mandate stance. The conflict also revealed tensions between the religious leadership, represented by 'Abd al-Husayn Sharaf al-Din, and the emerging political activists. Sharaf al-Din supported the return of Muhammad Said Bazzi, a pro-French figure, to Bint Jbeil, which led to public backlash and mockery.

The town was also a shoemaking center exporting to the Palestinian market, but the establishment of the State of Israel and the subsequent closure of the border led to the collapse of the industry, a major factor in the migration of residents to Beirut and abroad, particularly to Africa and the United States.

=== Modern era ===
During the Nakba, Palestinian refugees from the Galilee fled to villages in Jabal Amel, including Bint Jbeil, before continuing on foot toward Damascus, where they believed conditions were safer.

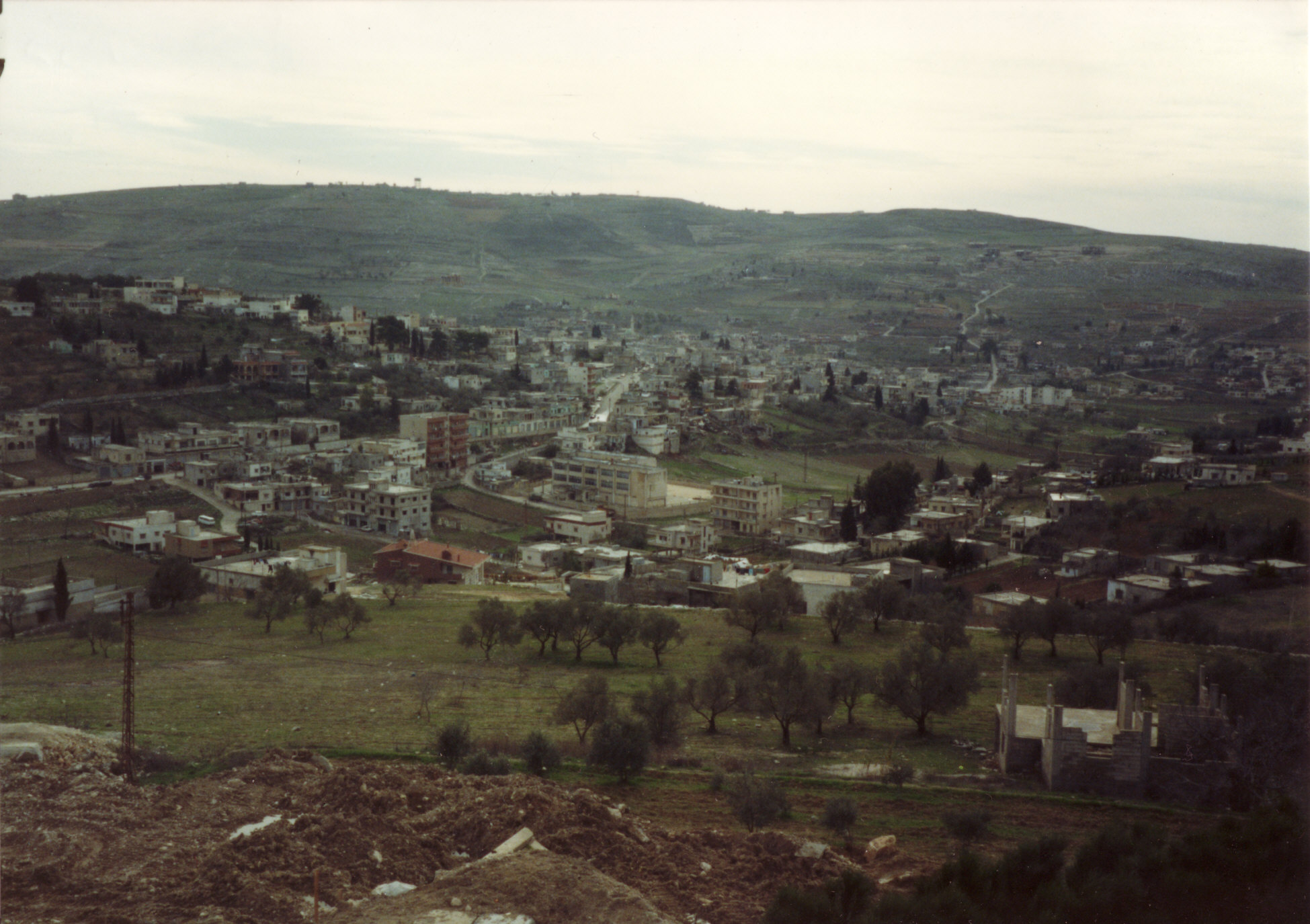
Bint Jbeil in 1989

With the rise of Palestinian militias in Lebanon the Lebanese Army attempted to control their activities. In October 1969 the army surrounded 150 Palestinians near Bint Jbeil. In six days of fighting sixteen of them were killed.

Bint Jbeil was briefly occupied by Israel in 1978 during Operation Litani, and again from 1982 until 2000 during the 1982–2000 South Lebanon conflict, when it was severely depopulated; as much as 75% of the population was reported to have left for other parts of Lebanon. It was the scene of occasional attacks on Israeli military forces, such as a car bombing carried out by a Hezbollah member on 25 April 1995 which destroyed the Israeli administrative headquarters in the town. Almost three weeks later, 15 May, a bomb near Bint Jbeil killed six Israeli soldiers and wounded four. Hezbollah took control of the town following the Israeli withdrawal from South Lebanon.

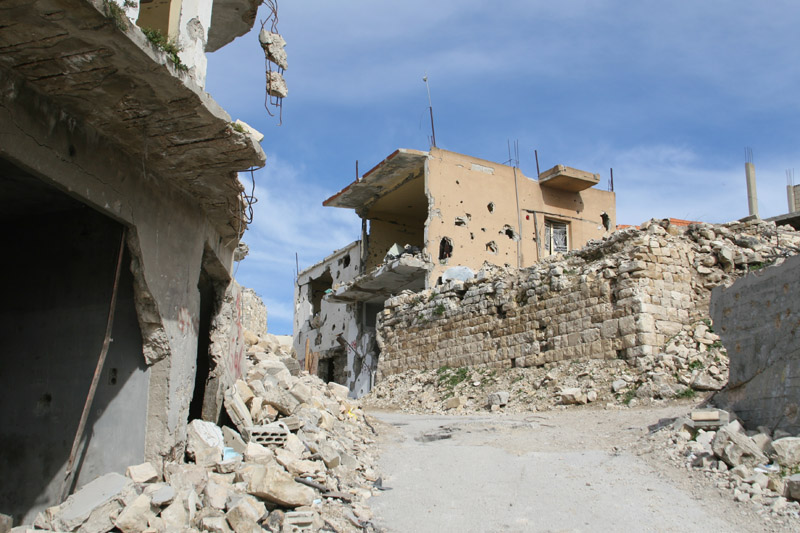
Center of Bint Jbeil after the Israeli incursion into southern Lebanon in 2006

As the largest town in the area, Bint Jbeil is sometimes known as the "Capital of the Liberated South" (among Lebanese Shi'ites). It is considered one of the centers with symbolic history for Hezbollah. Under Lebanon's complicated system of sectarian electoral representation, the Bint Jbeil electoral district is allocated 3 Shi'ite seats in the country's parliament. Hezbollah did well in the area in the 2005 elections in Lebanon, winning the local seats to add to its nationwide tally of 14.

During the 2006 Lebanon War, Israel began an offensive against Hezbollah and the conquest of Bint Jbeil was one of the first objectives for the IDF. At the start of the operation a Maglan reconnaissance unit was ambushed and had to be rescued by Egoz commandos. In four days of fighting seventeen Israeli soldiers were killed and most of the town destroyed (See Battle of Bint Jbeil). On July 15, Israeli missile killed 4 civilians, aged between 60 and 85.

Reconstruction as of early 2007 had been going very slowly, leading to reports of dissatisfaction among the residents. Then-Iranian president Mahmoud Ahmadinejad visited the town in 2010 to show solidarity for Hezbollah and the local victims of Israel's attacks.

In 2024, during the Israeli invasion of Lebanon, Lebanese Army troops opened fire on Israeli soldiers after strikes that killed two soldiers.

During the 2026 Lebanon war amidst a ground offensive by the Israeli army the settlement became the site of a large battle alongside bombing from Israel. The town was subsequently depopulated and destroyed.

== Demographics ==
Religion in Bint Jbeil (2014)
Religion	Percent
Shia Islam	97.87%
Sunni Islam	1.63%
Christian	0.24%
Others	0.26%

In 2014, Muslims made up 99.50% of registered voters in Bint Jbeil. 97.87% of the voters were Shiite Muslims.

At the end of 2022, the town had 586 registered Syrian refugees, which represented a decline from the 1,180 registered there in the summer of 2014. In 2026 the town was entirely depopulated and destroyed.

== Notable people ==
- Ali Ahmad Bazzi (born 1958), politician and MP
- Khalid Bazzi (1969–2006), Hezbollah commander
- Ahmad Zreik (born 1990), footballer

== News articles ==
- Greenberg, Hanan (25 July 2006). "IDF in control of Bint Jbeil". Ynet
- Siegel, Robert (26 July 2006). "Israeli Soldiers in Stiff Fight for Village". All Things Considered.
- Farrell, Stephen (27 July 2006). "Battle of Bint Jbeil shocks ground troops". Irish Independent.
- Gilmore, Inigo & Beaumont, Peter (30 July 2006 ). "Israelis withdraw from Hizbollah border stronghold". The Guardian.
- Blanford, Nicholas (1 August 2006). "Surveying the Damage in Bint Jbeil". Time.
- "The old and sick emerge to discover only rubble". The Telegraph. 1 August 2006.
- Weiss, Efrat (8 July 2006). "2 more troops killed in Bint Jbeil". Ynet.
- "Report: 'Several soldiers killed after requested to take photos faking capture of Lebanese town'". International Middle East Media Center. 26 October 2006.

== Gallery ==
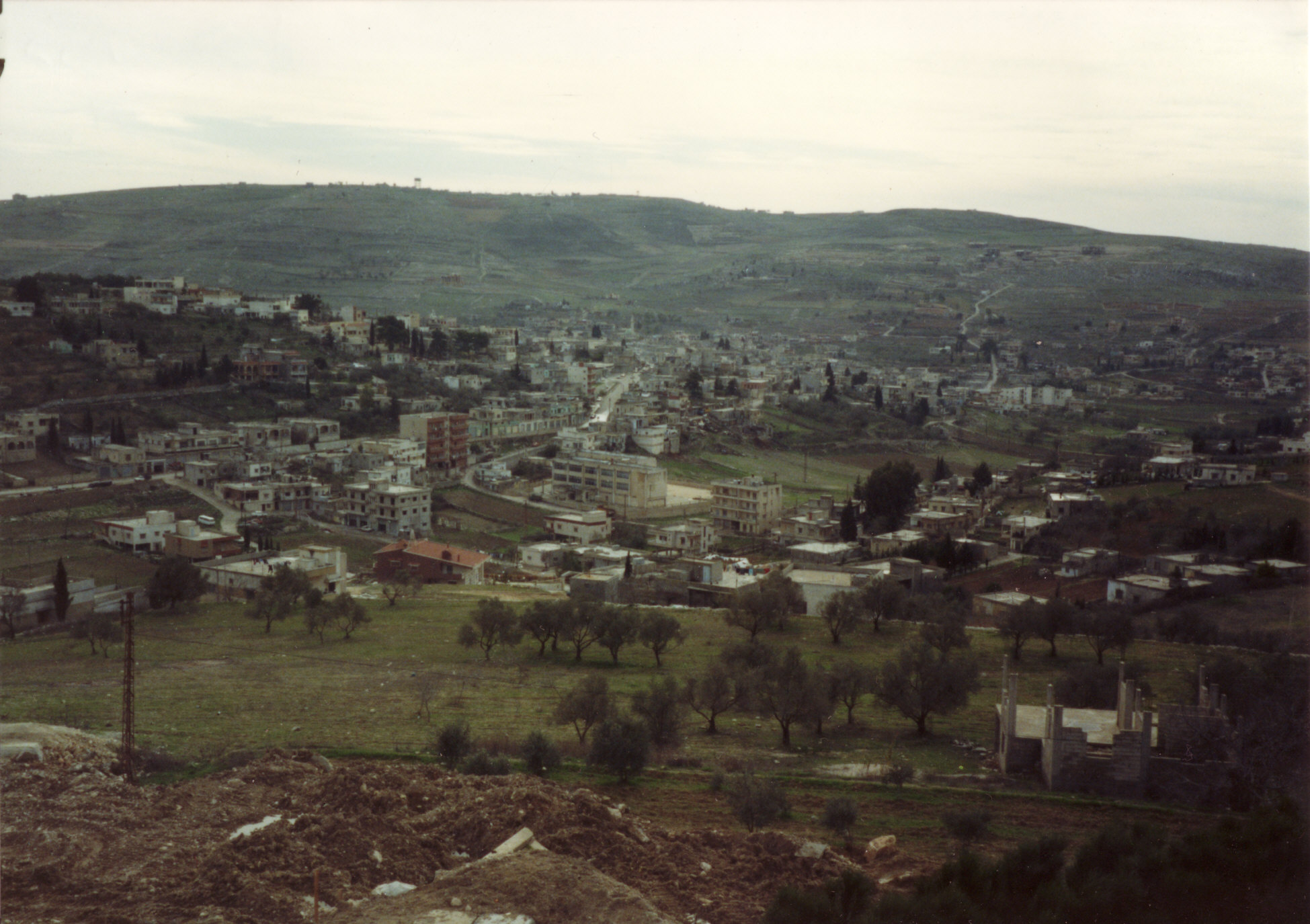

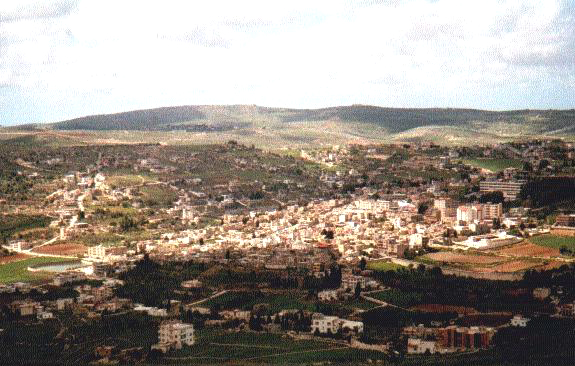

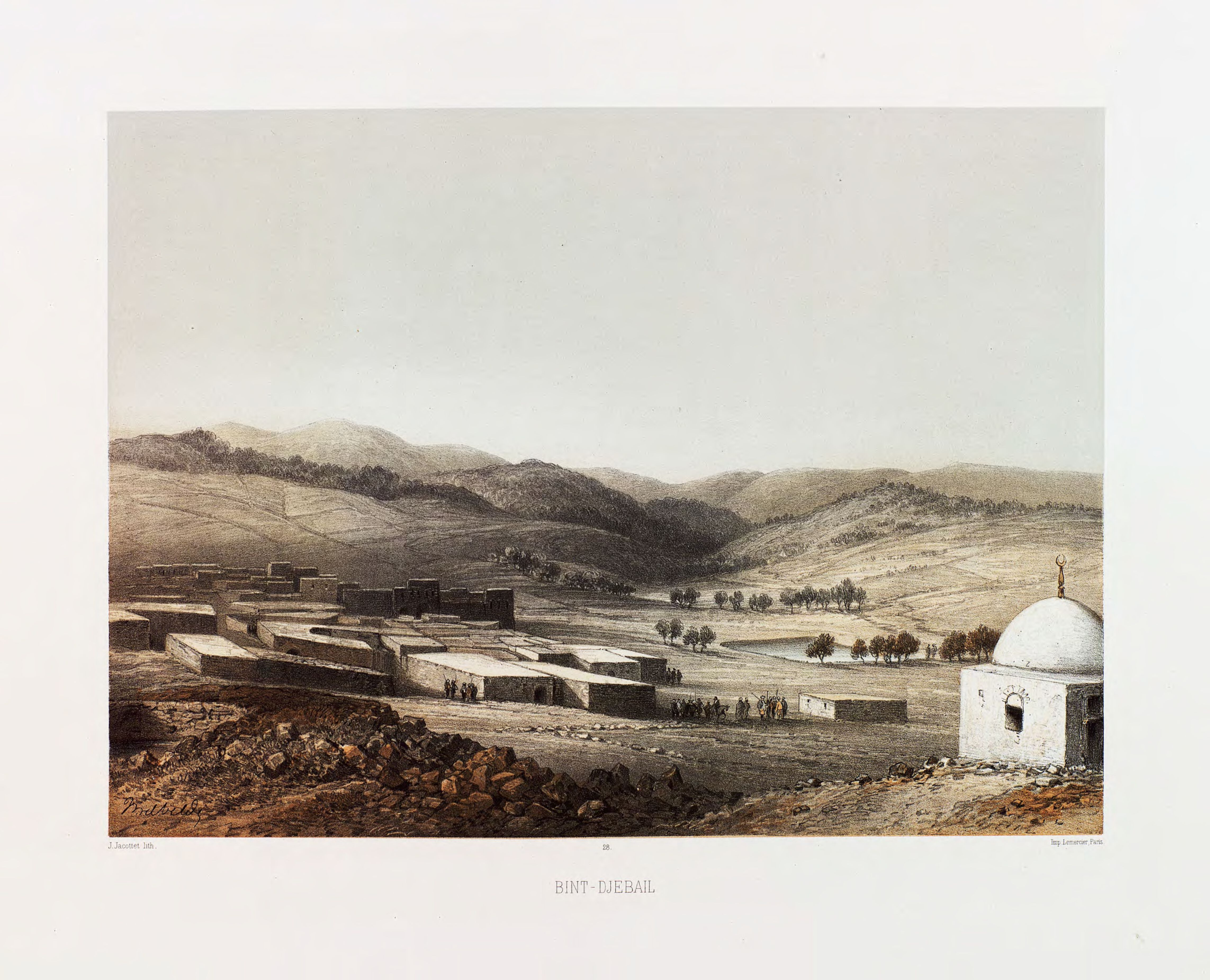

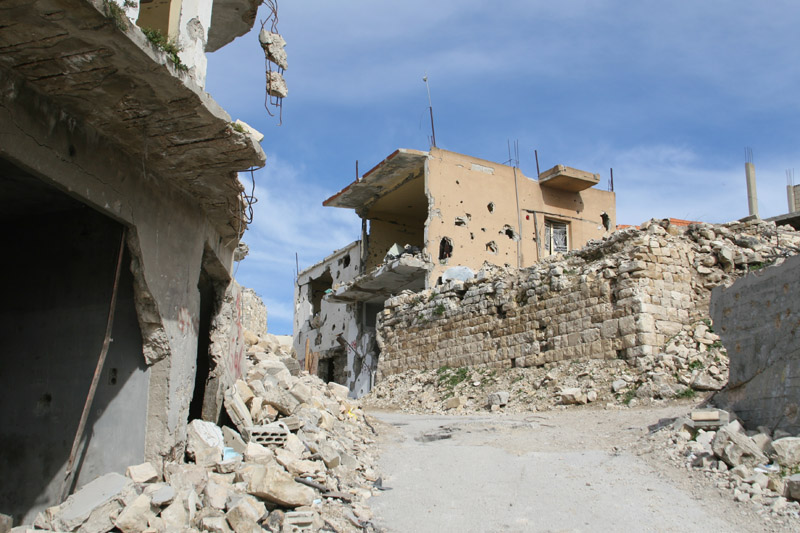

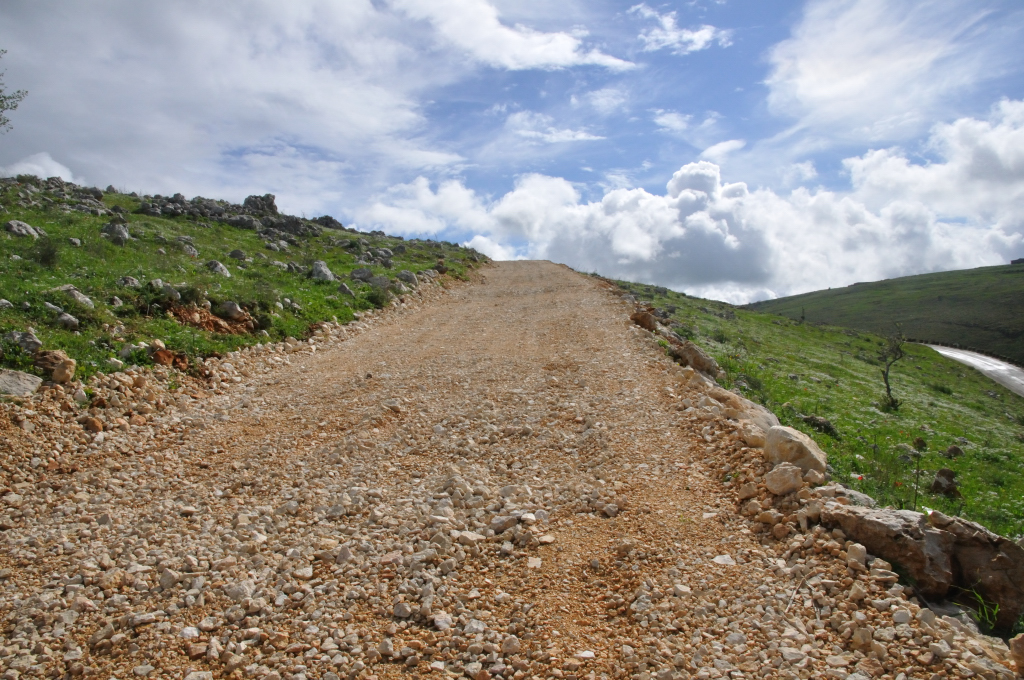

== Climate ==
Climate data for Bint Jbeil (Ain Ebel), elevation 765 m (2,510 ft)
Month	Jan	Feb	Mar	Apr	May	Jun	Jul	Aug	Sep	Oct	Nov	Dec	Year
Mean daily maximum °C (°F)	12.8 (55.0)	14.0 (57.2)	16.2 (61.2)	20.8 (69.4)	25.6 (78.1)	29.2 (84.6)	30.2 (86.4)	31.2 (88.2)	28.7 (83.7)	26.8 (80.2)	21.0 (69.8)	15.3 (59.5)	22.7 (72.8)
Daily mean °C (°F)	9.3 (48.7)	10.0 (50.0)	12.1 (53.8)	16.0 (60.8)	20.2 (68.4)	23.5 (74.3)	24.6 (76.3)	25.1 (77.2)	23.1 (73.6)	20.8 (69.4)	16.1 (61.0)	11.5 (52.7)	17.7 (63.9)
Mean daily minimum °C (°F)	6.9 (44.4)	7.3 (45.1)	8.6 (47.5)	11.6 (52.9)	15.3 (59.5)	18.1 (64.6)	19.5 (67.1)	20.2 (68.4)	18.8 (65.8)	16.8 (62.2)	12.8 (55.0)	9.1 (48.4)	13.8 (56.7)
Average precipitation mm (inches)	195 (7.7)	175 (6.9)	102 (4.0)	53 (2.1)	6 (0.2)	1 (0.0)	0 (0)	0 (0)	4 (0.2)	32 (1.3)	65 (2.6)	181 (7.1)	814 (32.1)
Source: FAO

== See also ==
- Southern Lebanon
- List of extrajudicial killings and political violence in Lebanon

== Bibliography ==
- Conder, C.R.; Kitchener, H.H. (1881). The Survey of Western Palestine: Memoirs of the Topography, Orography, Hydrography, and Archaeology. Vol. 1. London: Committee of the Palestine Exploration Fund.
- Guérin, V. (1880). Description Géographique Historique et Archéologique de la Palestine (in French). Vol. 3: Galilee, pt. 2. Paris: L'Imprimerie Nationale.
- HRW (2007). Why They Died: Civilian Casualties in Lebanon During the 2006 War. Human Rights Watch.
- Hütteroth, W.-D.; Abdulfattah, K. (1977). Historical Geography of Palestine, Transjordan and Southern Syria in the Late 16th Century. Erlanger Geographische Arbeiten, Sonderband 5. Erlangen, Germany: Vorstand der Fränkischen Geographischen Gesellschaft. ISBN 3-920405-41-2.
- Palmer, E.H. (1881). The Survey of Western Palestine: Arabic and English Name Lists Collected During the Survey by Lieutenants Conder and Kitchener, R. E. Transliterated and Explained by E.H. Palmer. Committee of the Palestine Exploration Fund.
- Rhode, H. (1979). Administration and Population of the Sancak of Safed in the Sixteenth Century. Columbia University. Archived from the original on 2020-03-01.
- Robinson, E.; Smith, E. (1841). Biblical Researches in Palestine, Mount Sinai and Arabia Petraea: A Journal of Travels in the year 1838. Vol. 3. Boston: Crocker & Brewster.
