= Timeline of the Gaza war (17 October 2024 – 26 November 2024) =

- Initial attacks; (7–27 October 2023); Invasion of the Gaza Strip; (28 October 2023 – 23 November 2023); First ceasefire; (24 November 2023 – 11 January 2024); Yemen airstrikes; (12 January 2024 – 6 May 2024); Rafah offensive; (7 May 2024 – 12 July 2024); Al-Mawasi attack; (13 July 2024 – 26 September 2024); Attack on Hezbollah headquarters; (27 September 2024 – 16 October 2024); Killing of Yahya Sinwar; (17 October 2024 – 26 November 2024); Israel–Lebanon ceasefire agreement; (27 November 2024 – 18 January 2025); Israel–Hamas ceasefire agreement; (19 January 2025 – 17 March 2025); March 2025 Israeli attacks on the Gaza Strip; (18 March 2025 – 15 May 2025); May 2025 Gaza offensive; (16 May 2025 – 19 August 2025); August 2025 Gaza offensive; (20 August 2025 – 2 October 2025); October 2025 Israel–Hamas ceasefire agreement; (3 October 2025 – present)

== October 2024 ==
=== 17 October ===
- The Gaza Health Ministry reported that at least 29 Palestinians were killed in Israeli attacks in the past 24 hours, increasing the Palestinian death toll in Gaza to 42,438. (Note: Casualty count includes both militants and civilians. For further information see Casualties of the Gaza war § Civilian to combatant ratio.)
- The Lebanese Health Ministry announced that at least 45 people were killed in Israeli attacks in the past 24 hours.
- SANA reported that the IDF struck Latakia. It also reported that "anti-aircraft defence intercepted hostile targets" and fire erupted after the attack. The Syrian Observatory for Human Rights reported that it "targeted a weapons depot".
- The US struck five underground weapons facilities in Houthi-controlled territory in Yemen using B-2 bombers. The Houthis vowed to respond after the strikes.
- Israeli soldiers raised the Israeli flag in the vicinity of a monument in Labbouneh, southern Lebanon.
- At least 100 Hezbollah targets were struck one day prior.
- Many families were trapped after their houses were bombed in a neighborhood at the entry point of the northern cities in the Gaza Strip.
- The IDF struck Tamnine Al Tahta in the Bekaa Valley and ordered residents of nearby Saraain al-Tahta to evacuate from their houses.
- A German warship operating under UNIFIL intercepted a drone off the coast of Lebanon.
- The International Labour Organization said that almost 100 percent of Gaza's population is facing poverty.
- Israeli forces shot and killed a 60-year-old Palestinian woman who was picking olives in Faqqua. Israeli forces also fired on an event organised by the Colonization and Wall Resistance Commission for helping farmers from Kafr al-Labad pick olives from their lands.
- Israeli strikes on an UNRWA-run school serving as a shelter for displaced people in Jabalia killed at least 28 people, including women and children and injured 160 others. The IDF said that it carried out a "precise strike on an operational meeting" of 18 Hamas and PIJ militants who were involved in rocket attacks targeting Israeli territory and planning and committing attacks targeting Israeli soldiers and Israel in recent days. Hamas denied the claim.
- The polio vaccination campaign for children from two to ten years old was completed in central Gaza. Vaccination for children in Khan Yunis and Rafah governorates will start on 19 October and will continue for four days, followed by children in northern Gaza.
- Israel said that they killed three gunmen in Tal as-Sultan. Dental records identified one of the deceased as Hamas leader Yahya Sinwar, who was also found to be carrying large amounts of shekels and personal identification documents. Hamas also confirmed his death.
- An Israeli air strike hit a residential building in the Maghazi refugee camp killing at least 10 people, including women and children.
- Israeli soldiers detonated several explosives in Muhajbib, demolishing most of the historic village. The IDF said that it destroyed a Redwan tunnel network in the center of the village.
- Attacks on israel:
  - Five Israeli soldiers were killed and an IDF officer and two soldiers were critically wounded while fighting in south Lebanon, increasing the IDF death toll in the invasion on Lebanon to 21. Nine other Israeli soldiers were also critically wounded while fighting in south Lebanon and the Gaza Strip.
  - Hezbollah fired 30 rockets towards Israel, and a drone was intercepted over the Mediterranean sea on its way to Israel.
  - Hezbollah said that it fired a barrage of rockets towards Safed and targeted an IDF base to the east of Netanya with Nasr-1 guided surface-to-surface missile. It also released a video of an Israeli tank engulfed by fire after the attack.
  - The Islamic Resistance in Iraq said that it launched a drone towards Eilat.
  - Approximately 30 rockets were launched towards Upper Galilee. Hezbollah said that it targeted a gathering of Israeli soldiers in al-Sadana, Shebaa Farms.
  - Hezbollah claimed that it struck two Merkava tanks with guided missiles near Labbouneh.
  - Hezbollah claimed that it destroyed two Israeli surveillance drones. It also announced that it is moving to a new escalatory stage in the confrontation and said that it will become clear in the coming days.
  - Hezbollah said that it targeted Israeli soldiers on the outskirts of Kafr Kila using artillery. It also said that its forces hit a gathering of Israeli soldiers on two occasions near Aita al-Shaab.

=== 18 October ===
- The Gaza Health Ministry reported that at least 62 Palestinians were killed in Israeli attacks in the past 24 hours, increasing the Palestinian death toll in Gaza according to its count to 42,500.
- Palestinian armed groups targeted Israeli forces using explosive devices and guns in Tubas.
- The World Health Organization alleged that Israel was blocking medical specialists from entering Gaza.
- The IDF said it had killed Hezbollah commander Mohammad Hussein Ramal in an air strike in Taybeh. It also said that it located and destroyed rocket launchers aimed for attacking northern Israel and discovered Hezbollah weapons in southern Lebanon. The IAF also struck a militant cell it said was preparing to launch an antitank missile towards Israeli soldiers operating in southern Lebanon.
- The IDF said that its air force conducted approximately 150 strikes on sites in the Gaza and Lebanon one day prior including munitions warehouses, rocket launch sites, and sniper and observation posts, and killed dozens of militants.
- Israeli soldiers detained a young shepherd while Israeli settlers stole his herd of sheep in Jurish.
- Israeli forces cut off communication and internet networks in northern Gaza, particularly in Jabalia.
- Al Jazeera reported that a home in al-Faluja area of Jabalia was demolished by Israeli bulldozers with a displaced family inside it.
- The IDF announced that it killed 60 Hezbollah militants during combat in southern Lebanon the day prior.
- The Belgian Prosecutor's Office said that a Belgian-Israeli soldier was under investigation for possible war crimes in Gaza.
- Attacks on Israel:
  - The IDF said that it identified militants crossing from Jordan towards the south of the Dead Sea region and killed two of them after they fired on Israeli forces. Two Israeli soldiers were injured in the attack, which was claimed by the Muslim Brotherhood in Jordan.
  - Seventy-five projectiles were launched by Hezbollah from Lebanon towards Israel, including 20 rockets. Some of them targeted the Philon IDF Base in Rosh Pinna, an air missile defence base east of Hadera, a gathering of soldiers in Safed, and an area north of Haifa.
  - Three rockets targeting the Haifa Bay were intercepted by the IDF.
  - An Israeli reservist of the Alon Brigade's 5030th Battalion who was critically injured during combat in southern Lebanon on 9 October died from his wounds, bringing the IDF death toll since the start of invasion of Lebanon to 22.

=== 19 October ===
- The Lebanese Health Ministry announced that at least 36 people were killed in Israeli attacks in the past 48 hours.
- The Gaza Health Ministry reported that at least 19 were killed in Gaza in the past 24 hours, increasing the death toll in Gaza according to its count to 42,519.
- A drone launched from Syria crashed in the northern Golan Heights.
- Palestinian armed groups targeted Israeli forces using guns and explosive devices in Balata refugee camp.
- The US Central Command destroyed 20 "Iranian-supplied" one-way attack drones and land attack cruise missiles in various parts of the Middle East in one week. It also said that Iran-backed militias in Iraq targeted US and coalition forces with rocket attacks two times.
- Three drones were launched from Lebanon towards Israel, one of which hit Benjamin Netanyahu's residence in Caesarea. Hezbollah claimed responsibility for the attack.
  - Hezbollah said that it also launched suicide drones towards Shlomi, an IDF base in Nesher, Kiryat Shmona and a group of Israeli soldiers in al-Marj and Zarit.
- Clashes were reported between Israeli soldiers and Hamas operatives in Jabalia refugee camp in the past 24 hours.
- One hundred rockets were launched from Lebanon towards northern Israel, damaging a residential building in Shlomi. Hezbollah said that it launched rockets towards a region north of Haifa. A person died and at least 13 people were injured in the rocket strikes.
- The IDF said that it killed Nasser Abd al-Aziz Rashid, deputy commander of Hezbollah's operations in Bint Jbeil District. It added that its forces located and destroyed stockpiles of weapons in southern Lebanon, "eliminated" two militant squads in Rafah, and destroyed Hamas military facilities in central Gaza and targeted militants in Jabalia.
- Two patients in the ICU of the Indonesia Hospital died after Israeli forces destroyed its generator.
- A Palestinian was shot and injured by Israeli forces in Qalandia Camp, northeast of Jerusalem.
- The IDF carried out a mass arrest campaign in evacuation centres in northern Gaza and took those arrested to undisclosed locations.
- The IDF issued evacuation orders for residents in Haret Hreik and Bourj el-Barajneh.
- The IDF said that it targeted Hezbollah's intelligence command centre and several munitions warehouses in several locations in the southern suburbs of Beirut.
- Two Israeli soldiers were killed while fighting in northern Gaza, bringing the IDF death toll in Gaza to 357. An explosive laden-drone critically injured an IDF officer in southern Lebanon.
- An Israeli reserve soldier died of injuries he had sustained in an October 9 clash with Hezbollah fighters in Lebanon, increasing the number of Israeli soldiers killed as a result of that clash to two.
- An Israeli strike on a clearly marked vehicle despite prior coordination with Israeli authorities killed four water engineers and workers of Coastal Municipalities Water Utility, a partner of Oxfam while they were on their way for repairing water infrastructure in Khuza'a, east of Khan Yunis.
- Approximately 200 projectiles were launched by Hezbollah towards Israel.
- A Hezbollah member captured in southern Lebanon died in the custody of Israeli soldiers.
- An Israeli missile strike killed an Iranian woman and her Lebanese husband in Beirut. They survived an initial strike.

=== 20 October ===
- The Gaza Health Ministry reported that at least 84 Palestinians were killed in Israeli attacks in the past 24 hours, increasing the Palestinian death toll in Gaza to 42,603.
- The IDF issued evacuation orders for residents to move at least 500 metres away from at least two buildings in Haret Hreik and Hadath. It also issued evacuation orders for some areas in the east of Lebanon for the first time in a week.
- The IDF said that its air force struck 175 militant targets in Gaza and Lebanon, striking weapons warehouses, rocket launch sites and other Hamas and Hezbollah infrastructure. It also said that it intercepted a "suspicious aerial target" off the coast of Haifa.
- The IDF said it had killed key Hezbollah officials Elhag Abbas Salameh, Racha Abbas Icha, and Ahmed Ali Hasin in its strike on Hezbollah intelligence headquarters in southern Beirut. It also said that it hit an underground weapons workshop in Beirut. It also said it had killed Alhaj Abbas Salameh, a senior figure in the Hezbollah's southern command, Radja Abbas Awache, a Hezbollah communications expert and Ahmad Ali Hussein, who was responsible for development of Hezbollah's strategic weapons, in airstrikes.
- At least 160 rockets were launched from Lebanon to Israel. Rockets were launched to places in northern Israel including areas in Safed, Haifa, Acre and Margaliot. Hezbollah said that it targeted an IDF base in the vicinity of Safed and Shebaa Farms.
- Israeli forces bombed a vehicle belonging to the Lebanese Armed forces on a road between Ain Ebel and Hanine in Bint Jbeil District, killing three soldiers. The IDF subsequently apologised, saying that they had been mistaken for militants.
- The al-Qassam Brigades claimed to have killed and injured Israeli soldiers by targeting two personnel carriers using a Shawaz explosive device and a Yassin-105 rocket launcher in the east and west of the Jabalia refugee camp.
- The Palestinian Central Bureau of Statistics said that five of its employees were killed since October 2023.
- The IDF said that it killed dozens of militants in close-quarter encounters on the ground and airstrikes across Gaza.
- Hezbollah said that it launched rockets towards Israeli soldiers in the outskirts of Markaba and west of Odaisseh.
- An Israeli strike on a small grocery shop in Deir al-Balah killed four people including an elderly woman.
- Armed Israeli settlers attacked Palestinian olive farmers in Ramin Valley, east of Tulkarm, and in Burqa, and stole olive harvests in Masafer Yatta.
- The IDF destroyed several villages in southern Lebanon including Ramyah, razing its homes and mosques.
- Ehsan Daxa, the commander of the IDF's 401st Armoured Brigade, who was of Druze ethnicity and held a rank of colonel in the IDF, was killed by explosive devices in Jabalia after exiting his tank. Another IDF officer was critically wounded in Gaza.
- The IDF demolished a UNIFIL observation tower and perimeter fence in Marwahin.
- Several Israeli airstrikes targeted branches of the Hezbollah-linked Al-Qard Al-Hasan Association bank in Beirut and the Beqaa Valley. One strike hit in close proximity to Beirut–Rafic Hariri International Airport.
- Hezbollah claimed that its air defense unit shot down an Israeli Hermes 450 drone.
- Several people were injured after Israeli forces bombed a house in the al-Tawbah Mosque area of Jabalia camp.

=== 21 October ===
- About 170 projectiles were launched by Hezbollah from Lebanon to Israel.
- The Islamic Resistance in Iraq said that it launched a drone towards an IDF target in the Golan Heights.
- COGAT said that 114 aid trucks entered Gaza a day prior.
- Clashes were reported between Israeli soldiers and Palestinian fighters in Rafah.
- The IDF arrested 18 people including two children in the West Bank.
- Hezbollah fired rockets towards an Israeli artillery position in Odem, Kiryat Shmona, targeted Israeli forces in al-Malkiyeh IDF site, an IDF base in Beit Lahia and targeted Israeli forces in Khalet Warda and Mizra. It also said that it targeted Israel soldiers operating in Maroun al-Ras.
- The IDF said that it hit approximately 15 short-range Hezbollah rocket launchers in southern Lebanon. It also said some of those launchers were used for recent attacks in northern Israel and added that it hit buildings used by Hezbollah in various areas of southern Lebanon.
- Israeli forces and settlers attacked Palestinian olive farmers and international activists supporting them using toxic gas in Beit Lid.
- Israeli artillery struck a crowd fleeing UN-run schools serving as shelter for displaced people in Jabalia refugee camp after an Israeli evacuation order, killing at least seven people.
- An Israeli strike on a tent in the al-Mawasi humanitarian zone killed at least two people, including a child, and injured six others.
- Shrapnel from a Hezbollah rocket attack lightly injured a man in Ayelet HaShahar.
- Israeli police arrested seven Israelis suspected of spying for Iran.
- The al-Qassam Brigades claimed that its fighters killed and injured Israeli soldiers by ambushing four IDF vehicles loaded with explosives in the Jabalia refugee camp.
- Syrian state media reported that a guided missile attack on a car in Mezzeh killed at least two people and injured three others. The IDF said that it killed the commander of a Hezbollah unit responsible for the transfer of weapons from Iran.
- An Israeli air strike on a building in Baalbek killed six people including a child.
- Israeli forces killed six men trying to get drinking water in Jabalia refugee camp.
- An Israeli strike on an area sheltering displaced people in Jabalia killed four Palestinians, including two women.
- Israeli artillery shelling on a school sheltering displaced people in Jabalia killed at least 10 people including children and injured several others.
- Hezbollah launched a "large missile barrage" towards Yoav IDF camp in the Golan Heights. Israeli Home Command said that sirens sounded in Margaliot and Manara.
- Several Palestinian children and young men were briefly detained and assaulted by Israeli soldiers during IDF raid in Az-Zawiya. A Palestinian child was beaten before being detained in Kafr Qallil.
- The Israeli Broadcasting Authority reported a suspected hack at the port database of Haifa.
- Hezbollah said that it targeted an IDF intelligence base in the suburbs of Tel Aviv.
- An Israeli airstrike in Kharayeb killed four people.
- Israeli airstrikes killed four paramedics in Babliyeh and one each in Khirbet Selm, Bir el-Sanasel and Deir Ez Zahrani.
- An Israeli airstrike near the Rafik Hariri University Hospital in Beirut killed at least 18 people, including four children, and injured at least 60 others.

=== 22 October ===
- The Gaza Health Ministry reported that at least 115 Palestinians were killed in Israeli attacks in the past 48 hours, increasing the Palestinian death toll in Gaza to 42,718.
- The Lebanese government reported that at least 63 people were killed in Israeli attacks in Lebanon in the past 24 hours.
- The IDF said it struck over 230 militant targets in Gaza and Lebanon in the past 24 hours.
- Israeli drones equipped with loudspeakers ordered families in Beit Lahia to flee through some roads leading to military checkpoints. Later, Palestinian men were arrested and were taken to undisclosed locations. Women were transferred to Gaza City.
- The IDF arrested 28 Palestinians including a child in the West Bank.
- The IDF said that it struck a Hezbollah naval base in Beirut used to store fast boats, carry out tests and train naval forces. It added that its other attacks hit weapons depots, command centres and other infrastructure. It also said that some of them were underground targets.
- The al-Qassam Brigades claimed to have killed and injured 12 Israeli soldiers by detonating an antipersonnel explosive device in the al-Faluja area of the Jabalia refugee camp.
- The IDF issued evacuation orders for residents to move at least 500 metres away from two buildings in Ghobeiry.
- An Israeli strike in Nabatieh injured three paramedics.
- Hezbollah confirmed that some of its fighters were captured by the IDF.
- The FBI announced an investigation into an alleged leak of US intelligence documents on Israeli plans to attack Iran.
- Seven Jerusalem residents were arrested by Israeli authorities over an alleged Iranian intelligence plot to assassinate an Israeli scientist and mayor.
- The IAF said that it struck ten Hezbollah command and control centers in Al Housh, southern Lebanon within the past 24 hours.
- The IDF confirmed the killing of Hashem Safieddine and 23 other members of Hezbollah's intelligence unit in an airstrike in Dahieh on 3 October after their bodies were reportedly found in the bunker that was struck. Hezbollah also confirmed his death.
- A woman trapped under rubble in Gaza City for five days was rescued by the Palestinian Civil Defence.
- Attacks on Israel:
  - Hezbollah fired ten rockets at Neot Mordechai, killing an Israeli reservist from the 7338th "Adirim" Artillery Brigade's 508th battalion and seriously injuring three other reservists.
  - A reservist major who served as the deputy commander of the IDF's Alon Brigade's 9308th battalion was killed during combat in southern Lebanon.
  - A third Israeli soldier was killed on the same day; the IDF stated the soldier was killed in a military-related car crash near the Gaza border.
  - The Al-Quds Brigades claimed that it killed Israeli soldiers by targeting IDF vehicles with explosives in the west of the Jabalia refugee camp.
  - A barrage of rockets was launched towards Beit Aryeh-Ofarim. Hezbollah claimed to have hit the Nirit area in suburbs of Tel Aviv. A state of emergency was declared in Tel Aviv.
  - Hezbollah claimed to have hit the Glilot base of Unit 8200 in the suburbs of Tel Aviv using missiles.
  - Hezbollah also launched medium-range rockets to Haifa. It claimed to have hit Stella Maris naval base, northwest of Haifa. Hezbollah also launched missiles towards an area north of Caesarea.
  - Falling interceptor fragments injured a man in Ma'agan Michael and damaged a residential building and several cars in the same area.
  - Sixteen Israeli soldiers were injured while fighting in Lebanon.
  - The al-Qassam Brigades said that it struck two Israeli D9 bulldozers using a Yassin 105 rocket and a Shawaz explosive device in the al-Faluja area of Jabalia. It added that its fighters attacked another Israeli D9 bulldozer in al-Saftawi Street north of Gaza City using a ground bomb.
  - Hezbollah said that its rocket strike targeted Israeli soldiers gathered in the west of Odaisseh. It also said that it targeted Hatzor using rockets.
  - The Houthis said that it targeted an IDF base in Tel Aviv with "hypersonic" ballistic missiles.
  - The Islamic Resistance in Iraq said that it targeted an IDF target in the Golan Heights with a drone strike.
  - Approximately 140 projectiles were launched from Lebanon by Hezbollah towards Israel. Hezbollah said that it launched kamikaze drones towards Eliakim IDF base south of Haifa.
  - Hezbollah drone attack on Israel sends a million people to shelters.

=== 23 October ===
- The Gaza Health Ministry reported that at least 74 Palestinians were killed in Israeli attacks in the past 24 hours, increasing the Palestinian death toll in Gaza to 42,792.
- The Lebanese government reported that at least 28 people were killed in Israeli attacks in Lebanon in the past 24 hours.
- The Islamic Resistance in Iraq said that it had launched a drone strike on a "vital target" in Eilat.
- Hezbollah said it had targeted an IDF intelligence base in the suburbs of Tel Aviv.
- The IDF launched strikes on area in Tyre centered around two buildings. The IDF said it had targeted Hezbollah command and control complexes, including the headquarters of the Southern Front Unit used to attack Israeli citizens and forces.
- The IDF said it had killed three Hezbollah sector commanders and 70 other Hezbollah militants. It also said it have killed Khalil Muhammad Amhaz, an expert in the Hezbollah air unit responsible for designing its kamikaze drones and reconnaissance drones.
- Approximately 135 rockets and five drones were launched from Lebanon towards Israel.
- The WHO announced that polio vaccination for children in northern Gaza was postponed due to Israeli bombardment, mass displacement and lack of access.
- Gholamreza Jalali, the head of Iran's National Organization for Passive Defense said that Israeli cyberattacks against Iranian interests are continuing, but they are facing a "layer-by-layer" defence strategy that have kept them at bay.
- The IDF said it have arrested over 150 Palestinian militants from Jabalia.
- Israeli settlers destroyed over 15 Palestinian-owned residential structures in the Jurat al-Kheil community east of Sa'ir and confiscated the belongings of its residents.
- A man was moderately injured by shrapnel in Nahariya during a Hezbollah barrage of 25 rockets.
- Hezbollah said it had launched a rocket strike targeting Israeli soldiers in Misgav Am.
- Hamas posted a video of its militants destroying an Israeli Merkava tank using rockets in the Tall az-Zaatar neighbourhood, east of Jabalia. It also claimed to have fired 114mm "Rajum" rockets at an Israeli command-and-control site along the Netzarim Corridor. It also reported that a D9 IDF bulldozer struck a landmine in as-Saftawi in northern Gaza and another bulldozer was targeted using an antiarmour shell and an explosive device in the al-Faluja neighbourhood of Jabalia.
- Spain's Defense Ministry said it had suspended all contracts to buy weapons from Israel since October 7, 2023, with the exception of maintenance work.
- Hezbollah said its militants had launched kamikaze drones containing explosives towards an IDF base south of Haifa.
- The al-Qassam Brigades said they had attacked an IDF command centre in northern Gaza using rockets and engaged Israeli soldiers inside using small-arms fire. They claimed to have killed and wounded some Israeli soldiers and said their militants had monitored the landing of two helicopters sent for evacuation.
- The IDF accused six Al Jazeera journalists in northern Gaza of being militants. Al Jazeera denied the accusation.
- Hezbollah said that it had forced Israeli soldiers to retreat when they attempted to "infiltrate" from the outskirts of Aitarun.
- Hezbollah claimed that it had killed over 70 Israeli soldiers.
- Israeli prime minister Benjamin Netanyahu said that Hezbollah had prepared an "invasion" of Israel.
- Four projectiles were launched from Lebanon towards central Israel, three of which were intercepted or hit open areas. Hezbollah later claimed that it had struck a military industries company in the suburbs of Tel Aviv using rockets.
- A Palestinian was lightly injured either by a rocket fired from Lebanon or an Israeli interceptor missile in Ras Atiya.
- The UN said that two water stations are not operating in northern Gaza due to lack of fuel and that fuel deliveries are being denied by Israeli authorities.
- The Gaza civil defence said that three of their rescuers were injured in a "targeted strike" which aimed to force them out of the Jabalia refugee camp. Later, they said that their northern Gaza operations were temporarily stopped after the IDF detained five staff members and destroyed their only fire truck. The Gaza City municipality said that an Israeli strike killed two of its workers and injured three others.
- Israeli forces conducted three operations in the town of Khiam in southern Lebanon.
- Four reservists of the Carmeli Brigade's 222nd Battalion were killed and six others were injured, three seriously, after they were ambushed by Hezbollah militants with grenades in southern Lebanon.

=== 24 October ===
- The Gaza Health Ministry reported that at least 55 Palestinians were killed in Israeli attacks in the past 24 hours, increasing the Palestinian death toll in Gaza to 42,847.
- The Lebanese government reported that at least 19 people were killed in Israeli attacks in Lebanon in the past 24 hours.
- Hezbollah launched approximately 120 rockets towards Israel.
- The Syrian defence ministry and SANA reported that Israeli strikes on a residential building in Kafr Sousa and a military site in Homs Governorate killed a soldier and wounded seven others.
- An Israeli strike during the evacuation of injured people from the outskirts of Yater killed three Lebanese soldiers, including an officer.
- Clashes were reported with Palestinian armed groups during an IDF raid in the Balata refugee camp.
- The IAF said it had killed dozens of militants over the past day, struck over 160 Hezbollah targets including launchers, military buildings and military infrastructure throughout Lebanon and "eliminated" several militant squads using aerial strikes. The IDF also said its 98th division had located ammunition depots containing hundreds of antitank missiles and mortar bombs.
- The IDF said that its Division 162 had killed dozens of militants and destroyed dozens of militant infrastructure in the Jabalia refugee camp since the start of the Second battle of Jabalia.
- An Israeli air strike hit a house in the Jabalia refugee camp killing a woman and her child.
- The IDF said it had struck several Hezbollah weapons storage facilities and weapons factories in its overnight strikes in Dahieh.
- More than 150 Palestinians were detained in northern Gaza and taken to Israel.
- IRGC chief Hossein Salami claimed that THAAD systems will not be enough if Israel prompts an Iranian attack by attacking Iran.
- Gaza civil defence said that Israeli forces ordered its crews to evacuate from north Gaza and move to the Indonesian hospital. Five of its vehicles were attacked in Beit Lahia.
- Rocket shrapnel moderately injured two people and lightly injured two others in the Western Galilee. Hezbollah claimed multiple strikes including launching rockets towards Safed and Nahariya and also targeted the Zevulon military industries base north of Haifa with rockets.
- Israel asked approximately 25 towns in the Upper Galilee to limit their movement, avoid gatherings and stay in the vicinity of protected zones.
- Israeli missile strikes on the Shuhadaa al-Nuseirat school serving as a shelter for displaced families in the Nuseirat refugee camp killed at least 18 Palestinians, including children, women, elderly people and injured at least 52 others. The IDF said it had targeted Hamas militants operating inside a command and control centre in the area.
- An Israeli strike on a car in the vicinity of Aley killed at least one person.
- The IDF arrested at least 18 people including a journalist from the West Bank. During an IDF raid in Hebron, Palestinian houses were vandalised and damaged and some Palestinians were used as human shields.
- Hamas said it is engaged in intense efforts to thwart implementation of the General's Plan in northern Gaza.
- Hezbollah claimed to have killed Israeli soldiers after a firefight in Ayta ash Shab, destroyed a Merkava tank which tried to provide support and hit another Merkava. It also claimed multiple rocket strikes targeting a gathering of Israeli soldiers in Misgav Am and Manara, Kiryat Shmona, and a logistical base affiliated with the IDF Northern Command between Nahariya and Acre.
- Hezbollah fired five rockets at Karmiel, with shrapnel from an intercepted rocket lightly injuring an elderly man. It also claimed that it had forced Israeli soldiers advancing in the vicinity of Odaisseh to retreat following clashes.
- Over 770 people were killed since the start of the Second battle of Jabalia. Gaza Civil Defense accused that the IDF had threatened to "bomb and kill" its crews in northern Gaza.
- Hezbollah said its fighters had struck a Merkava tank to the northwest of Odaisseh using a guided missile. It also claimed it had inflicted casualties and injuries on the Israeli crew.
- A Gaza civil defence worker said that Israeli forces killed some people around Kamal Edwan Hospital and arrested most of its surgeons. The director of the hospital said that their intensive care unit was severely damaged by Israeli tank shelling.
- Hezbollah said it had destroyed an IDF tank in Aita al-Shaab using a guided missile and claimed they had killed and injured its crew. It also said its fighters had engaged in intense clashes at "point-blank range" with assault weapons and rocket-propelled grenades against IDF vehicles in Aita al-Shaab.
- An IDF attack destroyed at least 10 residential buildings in the al-Hawja residential area inside the Jabalia refugee camp. According to an assessment by Gaza Civil Defense, it was estimated that 150 people including women and children were either killed or injured.
- Two Israeli officers were seriously injured in separate incidents in southern Lebanon. In a third incident, a commander of the Oketz Unit was killed and a reservist from the 55th Paratroopers Brigade's 7155th Battalion was seriously injured during a clash with Hezbollah members.
- Israeli strikes hit the southern suburbs of Beirut.
- Israeli artillery fire in Khan Yunis killed two Palestinians and injured 20 others including women and children.
- The IDF killed UNRWA employee Muhammad Abu Atiwi. It alleged that he was a Hamas commander and was responsible for killing and kidnapping Israeli civilians during the October 7 attacks.
- A projectile was launched from the "east" towards Israel. The Islamic Resistance in Iraq released a video to announce that it had launched a drone at a "vital target" in Eilat.
- Five reservists of the IDF's 8th Armored Brigade's 89th Battalion, including its deputy commander, were killed and 24 others were injured, four seriously, when a Hezbollah rocket struck a building in southern Lebanon.
- An Israeli strike in Khan Yunis killed an MSF employee.

=== 25 October ===
- The Lebanese Health Ministry reported that at least 41 people were killed in Israeli attacks in Lebanon in the past 24 hours.
- Israeli forces bombed a house belonging to the Farra family in Qizan an-Najjar, east of Khan Yunis, killing three people and injuring five more.
- An apparent Israeli targeted strike on a compound where journalists were housed in villas in Hasbaiyya killed three journalists. Two of them were staff members of the Hezbollah linked news television channel Al Mayadeen, and the third person killed was a staff member of the Hezbollah linked television station Al-Manar TV. Three others were injured.
- An Israeli strike on an oxygen station in Kamal Adwan Hospital reportedly killed a number of infants and children due to a lack of oxygen.
- Israeli strikes on a multiple residential structures in the al-Manara area, south of Khan Yunis, killed at least 38 people including 14 children.
- The IDF claimed that its fighter jets had killed Abbas Adnan Maslam, a Redwan force commander in Aitaroun responsible for the execution of many shooting plans targeting the IDF and settlements in northern Israel. It also claimed it had struck approximately 200 militant targets in Lebanon and killed a number of militants from the ground and air in Gaza over the past day.
- The IDF carried out mass arrests of men from Kamal Adwan Hospital, the arrested were taken to an unknown area for interrogation. Among those taken was 18-year-old Palestinian activist and media worker Abdul Rahman "Aboud" Batah.
- Five Israeli soldiers were killed during combat in southern Lebanon one day prior.
- Israeli soldiers stationed at al-Kassara junction, south of Hebron shot and injured a 16-year-old boy on his foot.
- Lebanese health minister Firass Abiad said that 163 rescuers and health workers were killed and 273 others were injured in Lebanon since the start of Israel-Hezbollah conflict.
- The Qassam Brigades reported that it carried out a "complex ambush" by hitting two personnel carriers and an IDF bulldozer east of Jabalia. It also reported that it sniped an Israeli soldier north of the Jabalia refugee camp.
- An Israeli soldier was seriously injured in southern Lebanon.
- An Israeli airstrike disabled the Qaa crossing on the Lebanon–Syria border.
- Israeli combat engineers from the Carmeli Brigade destroyed two Hezbollah tunnels in southern Lebanon.
- Israeli soldiers raided multiple houses in 'Anata, causing damage to property. Wafa reported that Israeli soldiers used the house of a resident as a temporary military outpost.
- Hezbollah claimed that it inflicted casualties on Israeli forces advancing towards Marwahin with anti-armour guided missiles. It added that it struck a Merkava tank with another guided missile and claimed that it killed and injured its crew. It said that it fired multiple rocket barrages at Israeli settlements along the border and said that it targeted an IDF base south of Haifa with missiles.
- An Israeli strike on Al-Shati refugee camp killed and injured at least 20 people.
- A leaked UNIFIL report accused the IDF of attacking UN positions 12 times. It also accused the IDF of using white phosphorus against peacekeepers.
- A Hezbollah rocket attack in Shomera injured six Israeli soldiers.
- The IDF said that it struck Hezbollah weapons production facilities, an intelligence headquarters and air defence capabilities in its air strikes in Beirut.
- Hezbollah fired 30 rockets targeting Karmiel. Two civilians were killed and seven others were injured, one critically and one seriously, when a rocket hit a market in the nearby city of Majd al-Krum.
- Three Israeli soldiers were killed while fighting in northern Gaza, bringing the IDF's death toll in the Gaza Strip to 361.
- Hezbollah said that it fired a rocket salvo towards Safed. It also said that it launched an air strike using a swarm of explosives containing drones towards an IDF base situated in the east of the same area.
- Hezbollah claimed that it inflicted injuries by targeting an Israeli force of 12 soldiers using a guided missile in the outskirts of Odaisseh. It also said that it struck a Hummer IDF vehicle with four soldiers.
- Gaza Civil Defense said that Israeli drone strikes on a group of Palestinians waiting for receiving aid in the vicinity of Shati refugee camp killed 12 people and injured several others.
- Hezbollah fired a total of 65 rockets at northern Israel throughout the day.

=== 26 October ===
- The Lebanese Health Ministry reported that at least 19 people were killed in Israeli attacks in Lebanon one day prior.
- The Gaza Health Ministry reported that at least 77 Palestinians were killed in Israeli attacks in the past 48 hours, increasing the Palestinian death toll in Gaza to 42,924.
- The IDF carried out airstrikes in Iran in response to its attacks against Israel. An Iranian civilian and four Iranian soldiers were killed in the strikes.
- Israeli soldiers reportedly used the parents of a Palestinian suspect in the as-Salam neighbourhood in the vicinity of Nur Shams refugee camp as human shields to force him to surrender.
- The IDF said that its fighter jets struck 70 Hezbollah targets including antitank positions, military buildings, ammunition depots and operatives in the past 24 hours. It also released a footage of its soldiers operating in southern Lebanon attacking Hezbollah operatives and retrieving weapons. A drone containing explosives was launched from Lebanon towards northern Israel.
- Two drones were launched from Lebanon towards Israel.
- The NNA reported that the IDF blew up houses in Odaisseh.
- Hezbollah said that it targeted the Tel Nof Airbase south of Tel Aviv with drone strikes. It said that it launched a rocket salvo towards Israeli soldiers on the outskirts of Aita al-Shaab.
- The al-Qassam Brigades said that its fighters blew up a house where Israeli soldiers were located, killing and injuring some of them. It also added that it targeted two tanks north of the Jabalia refugee camp.
- Hezbollah said that its rocket salvo targeted the Meishar base, allegedly an intelligence headquarters for northern Israel.
- The IDF detained 15 people including children from the West Bank. It reportedly physically assaulted and threatened detainees and caused significant property damage.
- An Israeli bombardment in Jabalia refugee camp killed the child of a hospital director. Israeli forces reportedly caused widespread damage to the pharmaceutical warehouse and the ICU of Kamal Adwan Hospital. COGAT said that several patients and their escorts were evacuated from the hospital with the help of UNICEF and WHO, while hospital was given fuel, blood units and medical equipment. The IDF said that it operated in the hospital due to intelligence regarding the presence of militants and militant infrastructure. The Palestinian Health Ministry said that Israeli forces arrested all male medical staff and a number of wounded and sick from the hospital and led them to unknown areas for interrogation. Women were detained in one of its rooms without water or food. Three staff members were injured after Israeli soldiers opened fire.
- Hezbollah launched about 80 projectiles towards Israel.
- The IDF said that it killed a Hamas commander who was the leader of Hamas operations in Tulkarm.
- Hezbollah said that it launched a rocket salvo towards five residential areas in northern Israel including the outskirts of Krayot.
- An Israeli airstrike on a health centre in Bazouriyeh killed a paramedic affiliated with the Hezbollah-affiliated Islamic Health Committee and injured five others including three paramedics from Islamic Health Committee.
- Microsoft fired two employees who organised an unapproved protest at its headquarters in Redmond for Palestinians killed in Gaza.
- Wafa reported that Israeli forces targeted al-Shahayda area north of Abasan al-Kabira, resulting in several deaths among civilians.
- Israeli forces shot and killed a Palestinian in the village of Azzun Al Atmeh, south of Qalqilyia.
- The IDF eased some restrictions for residents in areas of northern Israel.
- An Israeli strike on a residential area in Beit Lahia killed at least 35 Palestinians.
- Hezbollah urged residents of at least 25 communities in northern Israel and a few settlements in Golan Heights to evacuate, saying that those places have become "legitimate military targets" after stationing of Israeli forces.
- The IDF issued evacuation warnings for residents of several buildings in the Burj al-Barajneh and Hadath areas in the southern suburbs of Beirut.
- An elderly woman died after tripping on stairs while evacuating to a bomb shelter in Beit HaEmek.
- Five soldiers of the Alon Brigade, including its rabbi, and three Hezbollah fighters were killed during a battle in southern Lebanon, increasing the IDF death toll in the invasion of Lebanon to 37. Fourteen other soldiers were injured in the same incident, four of them seriously.

=== 27 October ===
- Israeli forces bombed a building that housed displaced people in Beit Lahia, killing ten people.
- Israeli forces attacked the Salah al-Din School in Gaza City, killing one person and injuring more. The IDF said that it targeted Hamas fighters who operated a command and control complex in the building.
- The Islamic Resistance in Iraq claimed a drone strike on a "viral target" in the occupied Golan Heights, during the time of the attacks sirens were set off in the illegal Kidmat Tsvi settlement.
- Hezbollah said that it launched a rocket salvo towards Kiryat Shmona.
- Al Jazeera reported that Israeli bombardment on homes in az-Zarqa area in the vicinity of Jabalia, killed many people.
- Two drones launched from Lebanon entered Israel.
- The Islamic Resistance in Iraq said that it launched drone strikes on a "vital target" in the Golan Heights and Eilat.
- The IDF said that its fighter jets struck Hezbollah weapons warehouses and sites used for the manufacturing and maintenance of weapons in Dahieh. It also claimed to have killed 70 Hezbollah fighters and struck over 120 Hezbollah positions.
- A drone launched from Lebanon hit the roof of a factory manufacturing aviation components in the industrial area of Bar-Lev in Karmiel, injuring two people. Hezbollah said that its drone strike targeted the "Yudifat military industries company" southwest of Acre.
- Iran's Supreme Leader Ali Khamenei said Iran's power should be demonstrated to Israel.
- A truck rammed into a bus stop in Aharon Yariv Boulevard in Ramat HaSharon, killing one person and injuring 40 others. The truck driver was shot and killed.
- Hezbollah claimed that its operatives killed and injured Israeli soldiers by hitting an Israeli infantry group advancing in Hula with a guided missile.
- The IDF issued evacuation orders for residents of 14 towns and villages in southern Lebanon to move to the north of the Awali river.
- Hezbollah said that it launched four more strikes on IDF and claimed that its drones killed and wounded Israeli soldiers in the vicinity of Manara and Marj IDF site.
- Approximately 75 rockets were launched from Lebanon towards northern Israel. One rocket hit the ground injuring three people in Tamra, including a woman who was critically injured.
- The IDF said that it shot dead a Palestinian who tried to carry out a ramming and stabbing attack targeting soldiers in the vicinity of Hizma.
- An Israeli air strike on UN run Asmaa school sheltering displaced families in Al-Shati refugee camp killed at least 11 people including at least two children and three journalists and injured several others. Those journalists worked for Hamas-affiliated media outlets. The IDF said it targeted Hamas operatives including an al-Qassam Brigades cell commander and three other militants in a command and control center embedded in the compound.
- The IDF said that it killed the commander of Hezbollah's Bint Jbeil division and his successor in two separate airstrikes within 24 hours.
- An Israeli airstrike in Sidon killed nine people and injured 25 others.
- A soldier from the Givati Brigade's Rotem Battalion died from wounds sustained during combat in northern Gaza on 18 October, increasing the IDF death toll in the Gaza Strip to 362.
- Hezbollah said that its air defence units forced back Israeli warplanes using surface-to-air missiles above western Lebanon.
- An Israeli air strike on a rescue center in Ain Baal killed seven people including a nurse and three paramedics and injured 24 others.
- A group of Israeli settlers gathered at the bypass road in the vicinity of the bridge connecting Madama and Burin and attacked the vehicles of Palestinian residents.
- Israeli strikes in Gaza killed two more reporters.
- Two Palestinian women were injured by Israeli settlers in Deir Sharaf.

=== 28 October ===
- The Gaza Health Ministry reported that at least 96 Palestinians were killed in Israeli attacks in the past 48 hours, increasing the Palestinian death toll in Gaza to 43,020.
- The Lebanese Health Ministry reported that at least 38 people were killed and 124 others were injured in Israeli attacks in Lebanon one day prior.
- Israeli strikes on at least five homes in Beit Lahia trapped at least a dozen Palestinians under the rubble.
- The Jenin Battalion claimed that it repelled Israeli soldiers from Jenin.
- The Islamic Resistance in Iraq said that it targeted an IDF target in northern Israel with drones.
- The IDF continued air and ground operations in Jabalia, killing dozens of fighters. It claimed that it destroyed underground tunnels and retrieved several weapons. It said that operations also continued in Rafah, killing fighters and destroying their infrastructure. Its soldiers located fighters in a nearby destroyed structure and killed them in cooperation with the IAF in one incident. It also said it killed a number of fighters and destroyed a building used by them in its operation in central Gaza.
- Mossad director David Barnea held negotiations with the Qatari government.
- The Gaza Health Ministry said that the IDF arrested and deported all medical staff except a pediatrician from the Kamal Edwan Hospital.
- Wafa reported that an Israeli drone shot dead a child in Maghazi refugee camp and an artillery strikes in Bureij refugee camp killed two civilians and wounded several others.
- There were unconfirmed reports that two IDF officers and a number of Israeli soldiers were killed in Lebanon. The IDF said that over 1200 Hezbollah militants were killed since the start of its ground operation in Lebanon and claimed that Hezbollah maintained only 30% of the rockets it initially had before the conflict.
- A major serving as a company commander in the IDF's 52nd Battalion (part of the 401st Armored Brigade) died from injuries suffered during combat in northern Gaza on 19 October.
- The IDF said that it arrested almost 100 Hamas militants from Kamal Adwan Hospital, saying that some of them participated in the October 7 attack. It also claimed that it found weapons, funds and intelligence documents in the hospital and surrounding area.
- In Jerusalem, a march and a hand-holding protest in support of Israel was held at the Western Wall. It was organized by the Indigenous Embassy Jerusalem, a nonprofit co-headed by Alfred Ngaro and founded in 2024 to change the "false narrative" that "paints the Jews as the foreign colonizers who have dispossessed the indigenous Palestinians". About 60 members of various Indigenous cultures from around the world participated. They said they affirm the God-given right of the people of Israel to the land, and compared the suffering of Jews in the state of Israel to the suffering of Indigenous nations.
- An Israeli airstrike in Tyre killed seven people and injured 17 others.
- Sinjil municipality said that Israeli settlers set fire to Palestinian land.
- Hezbollah claimed that a drone hit the Yudifat Military Industries Company southeast of Acre.
- Hezbollah claimed that it inflicted casualties and injuries among Israeli soldiers by ambushing two IDF vehicles advancing to the Tal Nahas area on the outskirts of Kafr Kila using machine guns and rockets.
- About 115 projectiles were launched by Hezbollah from Lebanon towards Israel.
- At least 60 people including at least two children were killed in Israeli airstrikes in the Baalbek area.
- Two people were killed in an Israeli airstrike on a vehicle in Al-Nizariyah, on the Syrian-Lebanese border.
- The Israeli Knesset passed legislation designating UNRWA as a "terrorist organization", which will take effect "within 90 days".
- The Houthis said that it targeted the ships SC Montrship using two drones and Maersk Kowloon using a missile in the Arabian Sea. It also said that it targeted the ship Motaro using ballistic missiles in the Red Sea and the Bab-el-Mandeb.
- The Gaza Health Ministry accused Israeli forces of sabotaging the polio vaccination campaign in northern Gaza and Gaza City.

=== 29 October ===
- The Gaza Health Ministry reported that at least 41 Palestinians were killed in Israeli attacks in the past 24 hours, increasing the Palestinian death toll in Gaza to 43,061.
- An Israeli air strike in central az-Zawayda killed 10 people.
- At least 109 Palestinians including children and women were killed and dozens of others were injured after an Israeli airstrike destroyed a five-story residential building housing displaced people in Beit Lahia.
- The Houthis said that it launched drones towards an industrial zone in Ashkelon.
- Hezbollah elected Naim Qassem as its new secretary-general.
- Israeli shelling in al-Bureij refugee camp killed a Palestinian woman and her two sons.
- Hezbollah fired 50 rockets at Ma'alot-Tarshiha, killing one person.
- The IDF said that it destroyed a Hezbollah underground command centre which was built eight metres underground and another bunker used to store half a tonne of explosives during its ground operations in southern Lebanon.
- A drone from Lebanon hit a bridge at the Nahariya railway station. A second drone was intercepted over the Upper Galilee.
- Four Israeli soldiers were killed in northern Gaza, increasing the IDF death toll in the Gaza Strip to 367.
- The Arab Center for the Advancement of Social Media said that at least 50 percent of telecommunications infrastructure in Gaza was destroyed.
- Eight Austrian peacekeepers were slightly injured when a Hezbollah rocket hit the UNIFIL headquarters in Camp Naqoura, in the vicinity of the Israeli border.
- Spain canceled a contract to buy police ammunition from an Israeli firm.
- Nine people were killed and a girl was trapped under rubble in an Israeli airstrike in Haret Saida, southeast of Sidon.
- Another Israeli air strike on a residential area in Beit Lahia killed at least 19 people.
- Israeli defence minister Yoav Gallant claimed that Hezbollah maintained only 20% of the rockets and missiles it initially had before the conflict. Hezbollah denied the claim.
- Two Palestinians were injured apparently by an Israeli settler while harvesting olives in the vicinity of Havat Gilad.
- The IDF announced that Hezbollah's commander in Ayta ash Shab was captured by Israeli forces two weeks prior.
- A soldier of the 7155th battalion of the 55th Paratroopers Brigade died of wounds sustained fighting Hezbollah in southern Lebanon on 24 October, increasing the IDF death toll in the invasion of Lebanon to 42.
- Israeli forces detained three people, including two children from Husan.
- Israeli tanks reportedly entered the outskirts of Khiam following a wave of heavy air attacks on the village. Hezbollah claimed that it destroyed two tanks with guided missiles and attacked Israeli troops with artillery and rockets southwest of the village.
- An Israeli airstrike in Sarafand killed 10 people and injured 21 others, while a strike near Sidon killed six and injured 37.
- Hezbollah fired approximately 75 rockets at northern Israel throughout the day.

=== 30 October ===
- The Gaza Health Ministry reported that at least 102 Palestinians were killed in Israeli attacks in the past 24 hours, increasing the Palestinian death toll in Gaza to 43,163.
- At least 77 people were killed in Israeli attacks in Lebanon in the past 24 hours.
- The IDF said that it carried out a "precise" strike on militants in the Khan Yunis "humanitarian zone".
- The Quds News Network and the Palestinian Information Center reported that an Israeli air strike on a house in the Sheikh Nasser area of Khan Yunis killed three people, including a woman and her children.
- Clashes were reported between Israeli forces and Palestinian fighters in Burqa and the Balata refugee camp.
- The IDF said that it struck over 100 targets in Lebanon including Hezbollah rocket launchers and claimed that it killed dozens of militants one day prior.
- An overnight drone attack apparently from Iraq caused minor damage to an aviation factory in Nahariya.
- Israeli settlers cut down and uprooted dozens of olive trees near Qaryut next to the Israeli settlement of Eli.
- The IDF issued evacuation orders for residents of at least eight towns in southern Lebanon to move to the north of the Awali River. Evacuation orders were also issued for residents of Baalbek, Ain Bourday and Douris, after which Israeli fighter jets launched a series of strikes on the al-Asira area of Baalbek, Iaat, Douris and surrounding areas.
- An Israeli drone strike hit a car in the Araya area of Baabda District.
- Shrapnel from a Hezbollah rocket attack near Metula injured two farmworkers, one seriously.
- The IDF announced that it killed Mustafa Ahmad Shahadi, the Redwan Force's deputy commander, in an airstrike in Nabatieh.
- Israeli airstrikes on one of the main markets in Beit Lahia killed 10 Palestinians and injured 20 others.
- An Israeli strike hit a car in the eastern area of Maghazi refugee camp killing three Palestinians including a woman and injured several others.
- Hezbollah launched at least 60 projectiles from Lebanon towards Israel.
- Israeli airstrikes in Sohmor killed 11 people and injured 15 others.
- The IDF said that it struck fuel depots situated in military complexes of logistical empowerment unit of Hezbollah in Bekaa.
- Hezbollah said that it struck the Ein Shemer Airfield, the Eliakim camp and Shraga base north of Acre with rockets and drones.
- Iran said that it killed a separatist linked to Israel.
- Glia said that Israel revoked a ban on its medical teams entering Gaza.
- The IDF announced a new division for operating on the border with Jordan.
- A Hezbollah drone attack injured two people in Hadera.
- The Lebanese Health Ministry announced that Israeli strikes killed 19 people, including eight women, in two towns in Baalbek District.
- The Islamic Resistance in Iraq said that it targeted a "vital target" in the Golan Heights using drones.
- A Katyusha rocket targeting Israel hit the Irish peacekeeping base Camp Shamrock in southern Lebanon, causing minor damage.

=== 31 October ===
- The Gaza Health Ministry reported that at least 41 Palestinians were killed in Israeli attacks in the past 24 hours, increasing the Palestinian death toll in Gaza to 43,204.
- Al Jazeera reported that at least 45 people were killed in Israeli attacks in Lebanon in the past 24 hours.
- Hezbollah-affiliated al-Manar reported that a drone launched from Lebanon hit its target in Nahariya.
- Hamas confirmed the death of Hussam Bassam Yousef Malah, a "prominent" Hamas leader in an Israeli undercover operation in Tulkarm. The IDF accused him and two other men recently killed by Israeli forces of planning attacks.
- The IDF laid siege to Nur Shams refugee camp and carried out a drone strike on a square, killing two people including a child and triggering clashes with Palestinian fighters.
- The Islamic Resistance in Iraq said that it launched drone strikes on "vital" targets in the Golan Heights and in northern Israel and an IDF site in southern Israel.
- Houthi media reported an US and British airstrike in the vicinity of Hodeidah University.
- The IDF said that its fighter jets struck approximately 150 Hamas linked targets in Gaza and Hezbollah-linked targets in Lebanon including Hezbollah headquarters and rocket launchers. It said that it launched dozens of strikes in central and northern Gaza and a Hezbollah unit launched a missile towards one of its fighter jets above an area north of Tyre and it responded by destroying the site. It also said that it continued its ground operations in southern Lebanon, destroying militant infrastructures and striking antitank squads.
- Al Jazeera reported that Israeli soldiers continued blowing up entire villages in southern Lebanon ostensibly for links to militant activity.
- Iran said that it foiled an attack by a separatist group it accused of links with Israel.
- The IDF issued evacuation orders for 10 towns and villages in southern Lebanon including Al-Hawsh, Borgholiyeh and Ansar. Later, a series of Israeli airstrikes struck the Al-Hawsh area.
- The Gaza Health Ministry said that Israeli forces struck the third floor of the Kamal Adwan Hospital containing medicine and medical supplies.
- Israeli police arrested an Israeli couple on suspicion of spying for Iran.
- Al Jazeera reported that Israeli forces launched airstrikes in Baalbek District, killing eight people, including two children.
- Al Jazeera reported that Israeli authorities moved to seize 64 dunams of Palestinian land from Umm Tuba.
- SANA reported that Israeli strikes hit a number of residential buildings in Al-Qusayr, causing "material damage" to its industrial zone and some of its residential neighbourhoods killing 10 people, including civilians. The IDF said that it struck Hezbollah command centers and weapon depots.
- A Hezbollah barrage of two rockets hit an apple orchard near Metula, killing five agricultural workers including four Thai nationals and seriously injuring one.
- Lebanon's LBC reported that an Israeli airstrike hit an Al-Risala Health Ambulance Association vehicle in Zefta killed a paramedic and wounded two others.
- Al Jazeera reported that an Israeli shelling hit a group of people in the vicinity of the al-Sahaba intersection at the Daraj neighbourhood in Gaza City, killing four people, including a child and injured several others.
- Al Jazeera reported that Israeli strikes killed five other medics and injured two others.
- Hezbollah fired 25 projectiles at the Haifa area. Two people were killed and a third was lightly injured near Kiryat Ata.
- Two drones were launched from the east towards Israel.
- Al Jazeera reported that an Israeli strike hit two homes in the vicinity of the Nuseirat refugee camp, killing 16 people.

== November 2024 ==
=== 1 November ===
- The Gaza Health Ministry reported that at least 55 Palestinians were killed in Israeli attacks in the past 24 hours, increasing its count of the Palestinian death toll in Gaza to 43,259.
- The Lebanese Health Ministry announced that 30 people were killed in Israeli attacks in Lebanon in the past 24 hours.
- The IDF issued two evacuation orders for residents of Haret Hreik, Bourj el-Barajneh, and Ghobeiry after which a series of Israeli strikes hit the areas.
- Two drones were launched from the east towards Israel.
- The IDF issued two other evacuation orders for residents of three neighbourhoods of Dahieh and an area referred to as the "pond enclosure" after which Israeli strikes hit the areas, killing two people and injuring four others.
- The Islamic Resistance in Iraq said that it launched three drones towards "vital targets" in southern Israel and a drone towards a "vital target" in the Golan Heights.
- Clashes were reported between IDF and Palestinian fighters in Nablus.
- A UAV launched towards Israel was intercepted in Syria.
- The IDF said that it killed three gunmen during a raid in Tulkarm.
- A platoon commander from the Givati Brigade died from injuries sustained when he was hit by weaponry which detonated inside a building in Rafah on September 17.
- Al Jazeera reported an Israeli strike hit a market in the Sheikh Radwan area, west of Gaza City. A child was also injured in the strike.
- An Israeli airstrike hit a home in Taraya killed two people including a woman and injured four others.
- A Hezbollah rocket barrage of approximately 30 rockets was launched towards Galilee, causing several injuries.
- Hezbollah claimed to have hit Karmiel and Ma'alot-Tarshiha.
- Wafa reported that armed Israeli settlers from Bat Ayin, backed by Israeli soldiers attacked Palestinian houses in the Deir al-Nil area of Surif and shot at them.
- The IDF said it had killed senior Hamas official Izz al-Din Kassab in an airstrike in Khan Yunis, saying that he was one of the last high-ranking members of Hamas responsible for coordinating with other groups in Gaza.
- Israeli police arrested several suspects for the alleged leak of classified intelligence from the prime minister's office containing sensitive information on the Gaza war.
- Al Jazeera reported that Israeli soldiers prevented Palestinian farmers from harvesting olives in Deir Istiya.
- An Israeli airstrike hit a border crossing on the Lebanon–Syria border, forcing it to close.
- Israeli airstrikes in Baalbek-Hermel Governorate killed 52 people and injured 72 others.
- Israeli naval forces reportedly captured Hezbollah official Imad Amhaz during a raid in Batroun, south of Tripoli.
- The IDF announced that the commander of Hezbollah's coastal unit and the commander of the unit's artillery division were killed in an airstrike in Tyre.

=== 2 November ===
- The Gaza Health Ministry reported that at least 55 Palestinians were killed in Israeli attacks in the past 24 hours, increasing the Palestinian death toll in Gaza to 43,314.
- The Lebanese Health Ministry announced that 71 people were killed in Israeli attacks in Lebanon a day prior.
- Clashes were reported between the IDF and the Al-Aqsa Martyrs Brigades during a raid in Jaba.
- Rockets launched from Lebanon injured at least 19 people in Hod HaSharon.
- 11 people were injured in a Hezbollah rocket attack on a building in Tira.
- Northern Command commander Ori Gordin was slightly wounded along with several Israeli soldiers after their vehicle overturned during a patrol in Lebanon.
- Al Jazeera Arabic reported that Israeli forces destroyed residential buildings north of the Nuseirat refugee camp.
- Al Jazeera reported that three civilians were killed after an Israeli drone strike in as-Saftawi, North Gaza Governorate.
- Wafa reported that armed Israeli settlers attacked Palestinian olive pickers in Khalat al-Haramiya, west of Salfit.
- Four drones were launched by Islamic Resistance in Iraq towards Israel, claiming that it targeted sites in Eilat.
- An Israeli strike on a home north of the Nuseirat camp killed Palestinian journalist Baraa Ali Daghish.
- Hezbollah claimed to target Yesod HaMa’ala, Bar Yohai, Birya, Palmachim Airbase, Zevulon military industries base and Krayot using drones and rockets. The IDF said that a factory near Nahariya was struck.
- The Al-Quds Brigades announced the death of two of its fighters from the Tulkarm Brigade while confronting Israeli forces in the Nur Shams refugee camp.
- Wafa reported that Israeli soldiers forced Palestinian farmers to leave their lands in Khirbet Yanun in Aqraba, Nablus after seizing their equipment while they were picking olives.
- Hezbollah claimed that it attacked Israeli forces east of Maroun al-Ras and in Safed using rockets.
- Six people, including four children were reportedly wounded in Sheikh Radwan clinic, a clinic hosting the polio vaccination campaign in northern Gaza. The IDF denied responsibility for the attack.
- An IDF soldier was killed in a grenade explosion in northern Gaza, which was apparently not related directly to the fighting.
- Two other soldiers, both of them of the Givati Brigade's Shaked battalion, were killed in northern Gaza. They were killed by an IED explosion whilst searching a building, increasing the IDF death toll in Gaza to 371.
- The IDF said that it killed Jaafar Khader Faour, a commander of the Nasser Brigade rocket unit of Hezbollah in southern Lebanon who was responsible for several attacks on Israel since October 2023.
- Hezbollah launched about 100 rockets from Lebanon towards Israel.
- Al-Quds Brigades said that its rockets targeted Sderot, Mefalsim and other communities near Gaza.
- A suspected quadcopter strike on the personal vehicle of a female UNICEF staff member working on the polio vaccination campaign while travelling through Jabalia–Nazla damaged the car. But the staff member was not wounded.
- An Israeli airstrike in Hazmieh killed a Bangladeshi expatriate worker when he entered a coffee shop on his way to work.
- More than 50 children were reportedly killed in Israeli strikes in Jabalia in the past two days.
- An Israeli artillery strike in Bureij refugee camp killed a man who worked as a driver for delivering humanitarian aid.

=== 3 November ===
- The Gaza Health Ministry reported that at least 27 Palestinians were killed in Israeli attacks in the past 24 hours, increasing the Palestinian death toll in Gaza to 43,341.
- The Lebanese Health Ministry announced that 18 people were killed in Israeli attacks in Lebanon a day prior.
- A drone was launched from the "east" towards the Golan Heights.
- The IDF said that it killed two key Hezbollah militants one responsible of missile launching plans towards communities in the Galilee panhandle, particularly Metula, and another who issued anti-tank fire at Israeli communities and forces in the Galilee. The IDF also said that it killed a PIJ militant in Gaza who served as assistant to the head of the Nukhaba of the Khan Yunis Brigade and raided Nir Oz on October 7.
- Wafa reported that an Israeli airstrike on a house in Jabalia killed three civilians and injured others.
- Israeli forces temporarily closed an access road using barbed wire in the Old City of Hebron, blocking students from reaching Ziad Jaber Elementary School for facilitating the passage of Israeli settlers to the Ibrahimi Mosque.
- Wafa reported that an Israeli air strike in al-Jarn neighbourhood of Jabalia killed a woman and her daughter.
- An Israeli drone strike in the Khirbet al-Adas area, northeast of Rafah killed a woman and her two children.
- The IDF issued evacuation orders for residents of a building in Duris and its surroundings to move no less than 500 meters. Later, at least three strikes were reported in the area.
- The IDF arrested 16 people including a child from the West Bank.
- The IDF said that it killed 900 militants since the start of the Second battle of Jabalia and detained 700 Palestinians, among whom at least 300 were confirmed as members of militant groups. It also said that it located and destroyed a large underground Hamas weapons manufacturing plant in the vicinity of Zeitoun neighborhood of Gaza City.
- Israeli settlers, accompanied by Israeli forces stole olive harvests belonging to local Palestinian farmers in Al-Mughayyir, Ramallah.
- An Israeli air strike on a residential house in Khan Yunis killed seven people, including four children.
- A man died of injuries sustained in a rocket attack in Nahariya on 23 October.
- Hezbollah claimed to have inflicted casualties and injuries among the crew of a Merkava tank in Metula by firing a guided missile.
- Israeli forces killed a 14-year-old Palestinian child in Halhoul.
- Gaza Civil Defence spokesman said that over 100,000 people are suffering from food, water and medicine shortages in north Gaza.
- An Israeli strike on a health centre in Bazouriyeh killed two paramedics and injured several others.
- Israeli forces struck the children's floor, the nursery department, and the water tanks of Kamal Adwan Hospital. It also shelled the hospital during a WHO delegation visit. A child was seriously injured.
- The IDF announced that it conducted a ground raid in Syria and seized a Syrian citizen whom it accused of spying for Iran.
- An Israeli strike in the vicinity of Burj el-Shemali camp hit UNRWA's premises.
- Hezbollah launched approximately 100 rockets towards Israel.
- The IDF announced that it captured Ali Soleiman al-Assi, an alleged spy for Iran who gathered intelligence on Israeli troops in the Golan Heights, during a raid by the Egoz Unit on his home near Quneitra several months ago.

=== 4 November ===
- The Gaza Health Ministry reported that at least 33 Palestinians were killed in Israeli attacks in the past 24 hours, increasing the Palestinian death toll in Gaza to 43,374.
- The Lebanese Health Ministry announced that 16 people were killed in Israeli attacks in Lebanon a day prior.
- Wafa reported that Israeli soldiers ransacked several houses during a raid in Beit Ummar.
- Israeli strikes damaged the Governmental Hospitals in Tebnine and Baalbek and injured at least 10 people.
- Israeli settlers burned approximately 20 vehicles belonging to Palestinians in El-Bireh and attacked Burqa.
- Israeli forces killed four people and injuring three others in a bombing in the Lebanese town of Machghara.
- Israeli forces strike in central Nuseirat killed one person and injured two more.
- The IDF said that IAF jets killed Abu Ali Rida, Hezbollah commander in Baraachit who was also responsible for planning and conducting rocket and anti-tank missile attacks on Israeli soldiers.
- Drone were launched from the "east" towards the Golan Heights and Israel.
- The Gaza Government Media Office said that all hospitals in northern Gaza are out of service.
- An Israeli air strike in Nuseirat refugee camp wounded five people, including children.
- The IDF arrested at least 12 people including a teenager and a media activist from the West Bank.
- Wafa reported that Israeli settlers attacked Palestinian olive pickers using sticks and stones in Berin, while the IDF prevented two families from reaching their land.
- An Israeli airstrike in central Gaza wounded two Palestinian olive pickers and killed five others.
- SANA reported an Israeli strike in the vicinity of Sayyidah Zaynab. The IAF said that its jets carried out strikes targeting targets of Hezbollah intelligence headquarters in Syria.
- Israeli shelling hit Kamal Adwan Hospital, injuring patients including children and some medical staff.
- The al-Qassam Brigades said that it targeted Israeli forces east of the Shujayea neighbourhood of Gaza City using mortar rounds and al-Quds Brigades said that it detonated an explosive device in an IDF vehicle east of Jabalia refugee camp.
- A Gaza civil defence spokesperson said that over 1,300 people were killed since the start of the Siege of North Gaza.
- The al-Qassam Brigades claimed that it killed and injured four Israeli soldiers who took refugee inside a home in al-Qassasib neighborhood of the Jabalia refugee camp and targeted a Merkava tank in the same area.
- Israeli settlers attacked and injured two female IDF soldiers in the illegal outpost of Giv'at Asaf in the West Bank.
- The US Army announced that a soldier who sustained critical injuries during a non-combat incident in May while supporting the Gaza floating pier died from his wounds on 31 October.
- An Israeli air strike on a home in Beit Lahia killed at least 25 people including 13 children and trapped several people under the rubble.
- Israeli defense minister Yoav Gallant approved the IDF's recommendation for issuing a second round of 7,000 orders to haredim for serving in the IDF.

=== 5 November ===
- The Gaza Health Ministry reported that at least 17 Palestinians were killed in Israeli attacks in the past 24 hours, increasing the Palestinian death toll in Gaza to 43,391.
- Israeli prime minister Benjamin Netanyahu fired Defence minister Yoav Gallant from his position for disagreements with post-war plans for Gaza and replaced him with Israel Katz.
- An Israeli strike on tents in Deir el-Balah killed two people, including a child.
- An Israeli strike on a tent in the Maen area east of Khan Yunis killed three people including a child.
- The Islamic Resistance in Iraq said that it launched three drone strikes on a "vital target" in Haifa.
- The IDF announced that a soldier of the 932nd Battalion in Nahal Brigade was critically wounded during combat in southern Lebanon a day prior.
- The IDF announced that it killed two Hezbollah militants with dual Asian nationalities who infiltrated Israel during the conflict.
- An Israeli strike on tents in the az-Zawayda killed six people, including a six-year-old child and a four-year-old child.
- The NNA reported that the IDF destroyed over 37 towns with approximately 40,000 housing units in southern Lebanon, centred in the area from Naqoura to the outskirts of Khiam. The IDF said that it targeted Hezbollah infrastructure.
- The IDF and Shin Bet claimed to have arrested over 60 PFLP members from the West Bank and Lebanon.
- The Islamic Resistance in Iraq said that it launched six drones on Israel.
- The IDF withdrew several brigades from southern Lebanon.
- Kamal Adwan Hospital was attacked by Israeli quadcopters.
- SANA reported an Israeli strike on an industrial zone in Al-Qusayr, Syria. The IDF said that it struck a facility belonging to Hezbollah's munition unit.
- Two elderly Palestinian patients, including a cancer patient died while waiting to cross an Israeli checkpoint in the vicinity of the Indonesian Hospital while fleeing from Beit Lahia.
- The Lebanese Health Ministry announced that 11 people were killed in Israeli attacks in Lebanon a day prior.
- Israeli soldiers detained a Birzeit University student and a female psychiatrist working for the Palestine Red Crescent Society from the West Bank.
- An Israeli strike on a residential building in Barja killed at least 30 people and injured several others including a woman and her child.

=== 6 November ===
- The Lebanese Health Ministry announced that 37 people were killed in Israeli attacks in Lebanon.
- Israeli forces shot and killed two men accused of attempting a ramming attack targeting Israeli forces in Qabatiya.
- An Israeli strike on a house in Block C of the Nuseirat refugee camp injured eight people including two women and five children.
- Clashes were reported between the IDF and the Jenin Battalion in Jenin.
- Islamic Resistance in Iraq said that it launched a drone strike towards a site in southern Israel and another strike towards a "vital target" in Haifa.
- An Israeli drone strike on another home in Nuseirat refugee camp wounded at least six people, including two women and three children.
- An Israeli strike on a home in Beit Lahia killed the wife of a Palestinian prisoner and her three children.
- An Israeli strike on a building serving as shelter for displaced people in the al-Manshiyya area of Beit Lahia killed at least 15 people.
- The IDF issued evacuation orders for residents in some areas of Nabatieh and Bourj el-Barajneh to move at least 500 metres.
- Hezbollah claimed to have wounded the crew of a Merkava tank in Metula by targeting it using a guided missile and killed and injured Israeli soldiers by striking a home in the same area.
- An Israeli soldier was killed when Hezbollah fired rockets on Avivim, a locality in Israel next to the Lebanon border. Three other soldiers were lightly injured.
- The IDF detained at least 12 Palestinians including a woman from the West Bank.
- A driver accused of crashing his car into a bus stop in Shilo and slightly injuring two civilians was shot and killed.
- An IDF dog attacked a three-year-old Palestinian child during a raid in Qabatiya.
- Over 150 rockets were launched by Hezbollah from Lebanon towards Israel, with one striking the area of Ben Gurion Airport and debris damaging a car in Ra'anana. Sharpnel from a Hezbollah rocket barrage in Kfar Masaryk killed an 18-year-old man.
- The IDF withdrew its 252nd Division from Gaza.
- A projectile was launched from central Gaza towards southern Israel.
- An Israeli air strike on a house north of the Nuseirat refugee camp killed at least four people including a child and injured 17 others.
- WHO chief Tedros Adhanom Ghebreyesus said that up to 10,000 children could not be reached for receiving a second dose and added that "efforts will continue to reach more children through regular health services".

=== 7 November ===
- The Gaza Health Ministry reported that at least 78 Palestinians were killed in Israeli attacks in the past 48 hours, increasing the Palestinian death toll in Gaza to 43,469.
- The Lebanese Health Ministry announced that 53 people were killed in Israeli attacks in Lebanon in the past 24 hours.
- Israeli police said that it shot and "neutralised" a suspect accused of trying to conduct a ramming attack against police officers in 'Anata.
- The Knesset passed laws allowing deportation of family members of "terrorists" and allowing the firing of teachers showing sympathy towards "terrorism".
- Hezbollah announced that an Israeli strike in Bazouriyeh killed an uncle of Hassan Nasrallah alongside his family.
- Palestinian fighters targeted Israeli forces using an explosive device during clashes in Tulkarm.
- The IDF said that it conducted over 110 strikes on targets in Lebanon and Gaza one day prior. It also said that fighter jets struck about 20 sites in the Bekaa Valley and north of the Litani River, killing approximately 60 Hezbollah operatives and dozens of sites in other parts of Lebanon. Israeli ground forces also destroyed militant infrastructure including a "rocket launcher used for an attack in central Israel and weapon depots. The IDF said that it killed an estimated 50 militants in Jabalia and Beit Lahia and killed a number of militants in Rafah. It also said that its 91st and 36th divisions demolished a Hezbollah military warehouse and a rocket launcher.
- The Islamic Resistance in Iraq said that it launched a drone towards an IDF target in "territories occupied by Israel".
- Israeli brigadier general Itzik Cohen said that the IDF will not allow northern Gaza residents to return to their houses and also said that humanitarian aid will not be regularly allowed to northern Gaza for preventing regrouping of Hamas militants, adding that there are "no more civilians left" in north Gaza.
- The IDF arrested at least 18 Palestinians including two girls from the West Bank.
- Israeli strike in various areas of Rafah killed six people, including three children.
- An Israeli airstrike on a car at a checkpoint in Sidon killed three people and injured three Lebanese soldiers and six Malaysian peacekeepers.
- An Israeli strike on a school serving as shelter for displaced people in the Al-Shati refugee camp killed 12 people including women and children.
- The IDF issued evacuation orders for an area northwest of Gaza City, saying that Palestinian militants launched rockets from there.
- Hezbollah claimed to have killed and wounded an Israeli infantry force which attempted to advance towards Yaroun.
- An Israeli air strike on a house in Jabalia refugee camp killed 27 people.
- Israeli settlers attacked a Palestinian home, physical attacked the family and set a vehicle on fire in Jaba', Jenin.
- A Palestinian woman was injured on her face after Israeli soldiers fired a tear gas canister at her car during a raid in Al-Khader.

=== 8 November ===
- The Gaza Health Ministry reported that at least 39 Palestinians were killed in Israeli attacks in the past 24 hours, increasing the Palestinian death toll in Gaza to 43,508.
- The Lebanese Health Ministry announced that 15 people were killed in Israeli attacks in Lebanon a day prior.
- An Israeli air strike on a home in the Daraj neighbourhood of Gaza City killed at least nine people including children and women.
- The Houthis claimed that its air defences downed an American General Atomics MQ-9 Reaper in al Jawf Governorate.
- Palestinian fighters targeted Israeli forces using an explosive device in Balata refugee camp.
- The IDF said that a soldier who fired grenades at already heavily bombed buildings in Gaza for celebrating the victory of Donald Trump in the 2024 United States presidential election would be "disciplined" by his commanders.
- A fisherman was killed and three others were injured during attacks by Israeli forces on the coast of Rafah.
- Israeli forces entered the French-administered Church of the Pater Noster on the Mount of Olives in occupied East Jerusalem and briefly detained two French consulate gendarmes with diplomatic status.
- Israeli forces shot and "neutralized" a motorist in the Shu'fat refugee camp, north of occupied East Jerusalem.
- The Israeli foreign ministry said that 10 Israelis were wounded following clashes between pro-Palestinian protesters and Maccabi Tel Aviv F.C fans before and after a Europa League football match between AFC Ajax and Maccabi Tel Aviv F.C in Amsterdam. Violence broke out after Maccabi Tel Aviv F.C fans started climbing the walls of private buildings and tearing down Palestinian flags hanging from their windows. Dutch authorities called the incidents "antisemitic".
- Hezbollah claimed to have hit Israeli forces in Jal al-Hammar, south of Odaisseh.
- An Israeli soldier in the Alon Brigade died of injuries sustained in an October 26 clash with Hezbollah fighters in southern Lebanon, in which five other Israeli soldiers were reported killed earlier.
- An Israeli air strike on a medical center in Tyre district on the road connecting Deir Qanoun to Ras al-Ain and Naqoura killed a paramedic from Tayr Harfa.
- Wafa reported that civilians were wounded by Israeli shelling of the Halima Al-Sadia School in Jabalia refugee camp.
- The NNA reported that the IDF detonated explosives planted inside homes in Yaroun, Aitaroun and Maroun al-Ras "with the aim of destroying residential homes there".
- Al Jazeera reported that Israeli strikes in Beit Lahia struck residential houses and agricultural land and trapped people including civilians under the rubble.
- A missile was launched from Yemen towards Israel. The Houthis said that it targeted Nevatim Airbase using a Palestine 2 hypersonic ballistic rocket.
- Israeli settlers attacked Palestinian olive-pickers in Deir Jarir and cut down approximately 70 olive, grape, and almond trees belonging to Palestinian residents in Nahalin.
- Hezbollah claimed to have hit Israeli soldiers using missiles in Margaliot and Misgav Am.
- The Office of the United Nations High Commissioner for Human Rights said that it verified the identities of 8,119 people died from the war, of which almost 70% were women and children. The IDF said that the civilian-militant ratio was 1:1 which it blamed on Hamas and its use of civilian facilities. Hamas denied the claim. Israeli diplomatic mission in Geneva said that it "categorically rejects" the "damning" UN report on its conduct during its Gaza war and accused that UN relied on "unverified information".
- A man was injured after falling from a ladder due to rocket sirens in the Lower Galilee.
- The Qassam Brigades said that it attacked Israeli soldiers using mortar rounds southeast of Shujayea, Gaza City. PIJ said that it targeted a group of Israeli soldiers using mortar fire along the Netzarim Corridor.
- An Israeli drone strike on a home in Abasan al-Jadida, Khan Yunis Governorate killed a Palestinian child.
- The IDF issued evacuation orders for residents of an area in Dahieh to move at least 500 metres. Later, at least 14 Israeli air strikes was conducted on the outskirts of Beirut. The IDF said that it struck Hezbollah command headquarters, a weapons production site, and other infrastructure.
- An Israeli airstrike in Aleppo and Idlib injured several Syrian soldiers.
- The IDF said that it stepped up humanitarian efforts including opening an additional crossing.

=== 9 November ===
- The Gaza Health Ministry reported that at least 44 Palestinians were killed in Israeli attacks in the past 24 hours, increasing the Palestinian death toll in Gaza to 43,552.
- The Lebanese Health Ministry announced that 19 people were killed in Israeli attacks in Lebanon a day prior.
- The Islamic Resistance in Iraq said it launched a drone towards an IDF target in northern Israel.
- Israeli forces detained and assaulted several Palestinians during a raid in the Ras area in the vicinity of Wadi al-Hussein, east of Hebron.
- The Jenin Brigades claimed to have hit IDF vehicles by detonating a "highly explosive device" in Silat ad-Dhahr.
- Israeli fighter jets struck two buildings in Tyre killing at least nine people, including a pregnant woman and a child and injured 38 others.
- The IDF said that its 162nd Division killed dozens of militants and destroyed a weapons warehouse in Jabalia in the past day. It also said that the Nahal Brigade killed militants, located weapons and destroyed militant infrastructure in Rafah. It added that the IAF struck over 50 militant targets in Lebanon and the Gaza Strip in the past 24 hours.
- An Israeli air strike on Fahd al-Sabah school serving as shelter for displaced Palestinians in the Tuffah neighborhood of Gaza City killed at least six people from two families including two journalists.
- An Israeli strike on tents in Israeli-designated safe zone in the al-Mawasi area of Khan Yunis killed at least nine Palestinians including women and children and injured several others.
- Clashes erupted inside 'Aqqaba after the IDF sent a number of vehicles, accompanied by a bulldozer, from the Hamra and Tayasir checkpoints to surround several houses and arrest a number of Palestinians, killing one person. The IDF announced that it killed a Palestinian gunman in an exchange of fire and arrested five Palestinians from Tubas and 'Aqqaba. It said that it located weapons and money during its operation in Tubas.
- Hezbollah claimed that its air defence unit shot down an Israeli Elbit Hermes 450 drone using a surface-to-air missile in Lebanese territory.
- Israeli strikes in southern Lebanon killed 11 people including 6 rescuers affiliated to the Amal Movement and Hezbollah.
- The al-Qassam Brigades said that it targeted an IDF bulldozer using an RPG shell in the al-Qassasib neighbourhood of Jabalia.
- Wafa reported that Israeli Navy killed three Palestinian men by targeting them using gunfire from warships as they were in the vicinity of al-Khalidi Mosque along the coastal road northwest of Gaza City soon after releasing them from detention after detaining them during IDF's offensive in northern Gaza in early October.
- Qatar said Hamas-Israel negotiations are on hold. Ten days earlier Qatar said it would suspend mediation efforts if no agreement was made in that round of negotiations, and indeed no agreement was made in that round. Qatar said it is not withdrawing from mediation and negotiations will resume when the parties show "seriousness" to end the war. Hamas said that it accepted the January 2025 Gaza war ceasefire and rejected a new short-term ceasefire proposal. Earlier, there were media reports, citing anonymous sources in U.S. administration, that portrayed Qatar's decision as Qatar expelling Hamas from the country at U.S. behest. These reports were explicitly denied by Qatar. Qatar said reports of closing Hamas' bureau in Qatar are inaccurate and the bureau was, and is, an important channel of communication. Qatar noted how, during negotiations, there was "manipulation" by using negotiations as an excuse for prolonging the war, and by reneging on previously agreed-upon commitments.
- Israeli air strikes in the southern suburbs of Beirut extensively damaged some buildings of the Rafik Hariri University in Hadath, Mount Lebanon.
- Locals told Wafa that Israeli forces fired toxic tear gas canisters at residents and their houses, resulting in several people suffering from suffocation during an IDF raid in Abu Dis.

=== 10 November ===
- The Gaza Health Ministry reported that at least 51 Palestinians were killed in Israeli attacks in the past 24 hours, increasing the Palestinian death toll in Gaza to 43,603.
- The Lebanese Health Ministry announced that 53 people were killed in Israeli attacks in Lebanon a day prior.
- An Israeli air strike in Tyre killed a woman and her four disabled siblings.
- Israeli missile strikes on tents serving as shelter for displaced Palestinians on the grounds of Al-Aqsa Hospital killed two Palestinians and injured 26 others including journalists.
- The Houthi-affiliated Al-Masirah reported that US and UK forces launched air strikes on Sanaa, 'Amran Governorate and other areas of Yemen. US officials confirmed the strikes, saying that US forces conducted multiple air strikes on facilities used by Houthis for storing weapons.
- IDF spokesperson Avichay Adraee said that burning of Flag of Lebanon by some soldiers was a violation of its orders.
- An Israeli strike destroyed a home in Old Gaza Street of northern Jabalia refugee camp killing at least 36 Palestinians including 13 children and nine women and wounded several others and several others went missing. The IDF said that it targeted a site where militants operated.
- An Israeli strike on the civil defense centre affiliated to the Islamic Mission Scouts Association in Ras al-Ain, Lebanon killed 15 people and injured two others.
- An Israeli strike on a home in Ain Baal injured five people including civilians.
- An Israeli strike in Srifa caused critical to moderate injuries to several people including civilians and severely damaged a hospital's equipment.
- Israeli settlers cut down various types of trees owned by a Palestinian resident in the outskirts of Nahalin.
- An Israeli strike on a home in Almat, Jbeil district killed 23 people including seven children and wounded six others.
- An Israeli strike on a civil defence center affiliated with the Islamic Health Authority in Adloun killed three paramedics.
- The US suspended the delivery of 130 D9 bulldozers to Israel.
- SANA reported that an Israeli air strike in Sayyidah Zaynab inflicted casualties. The Syrian Observatory for Human Rights reported that nine people—including a woman, three children, and a Hezbollah commander were killed and 14 others were injured in an apartment. The Syrian Ministry of Defense reported that the strikes killed seven civilians including women and children and wounded 20 others.
- Civil defence authorities eased restrictions in northern Israel excluding area closest to the Lebanese border.
- An Israeli strike on a house in Gaza City killed Wael al-Khour, a minister in the Hamas-run government, his wife and three children.
- Israeli prime minister Benjamin Netanyahu reportedly acknowledged for the first time that Israel was behind the pager and walkie-talkie attacks during a cabinet meeting. He stated that the operations "were carried out despite the opposition of senior officials in the defense establishment and those responsible for them in the political echelon".
- A Hezbollah anti-tank missile attack injured three people in Metula, while a separate rocket attack in Kabri injured three others.
- Hezbollah claimed to have hit Haifa naval base using drones.
- Two drones were launched from "the east" towards Israel. The Islamic Resistance in Iraq said that it conducted drone strikes on "vital targets" in the northern and southern Israel.
- The al-Qassam Brigades claimed to have killed 15 Israeli soldiers from close range using an antitank rocket, grenades and light weapons in Beit Lahia.
- IDF Chief of Staff Herzi Halevi approved an expansion of its ground operation in southern Lebanon.

=== 11 November ===
- The Lebanese Health Ministry announced that 54 people were killed in Israeli attacks in Lebanon a day prior.
- A projectile was launched from Yemen towards Israel.
- The Islamic Resistance in Iraq also said that it launched five drone strikes towards IDF targets in northern and southern Israel.
- In the Nuseirat camp, three people were killed and multiple people were injured after Israeli forces attacked tents housing displaced people. In a separate attack an Israeli quadcopter struck a group of people installing a water pipe network, killing two people. An Israeli strike on a tent killed a journalist and his wife.
- Al-Masirah reported that US and UK forces conducted multiple air attacks in 'Amran Governorate and Saada Governorate.
- Israeli gunfire during clashes in the Jalazone refugee camp wounded five Palestinians including a child.
- The Houthis said that it launched a hypersonic ballistic missile towards an IDF base near Tel Aviv.
- Hezbollah spokesman Mohammad Afif stated that Israel has not managed to capture "a single" village in Lebanon so far during the invasion, he also dismissed the IDF claim of a significant decline of Hezbollah's missile stockpile as "just lies".
- SANA reported an Israeli airstrike in the vicinity of Shinshar.
- The IDF issued evacuation orders for residents of 21 towns in southern Lebanon to move to north of the Awali River.
- Hezbollah launched 165 projectiles at northern Israel. Fifty rockets targeted the Karmiel area, wounding three people including a child in Bi'ina. Another 90 rockets were fired at Haifa Bay, damaging houses and vehicles in Kiryat Ata and injuring four people.
- The al-Qassam Brigades said that it targeted a Merkava 4 tank using rockets in the Saftawi area, west of the Jabalia refugee camp.
- Satellite photos analyzed by The Associated Press showed that the IDF started construction of a road along the so-called Alpha Line which separates the Israeli-occupied Golan Heights from Syria, while Israeli soldiers entered this demilitarized zone during the construction, violating cease-fire rules governing the area.
- An Israeli airstrike on a building in Ain Yaaqoub killed at least 14 people, injured 15 others and trapped some people under the rubble.
- Israel said that it implemented the majority of US demands on aid for Gaza.
- The US Central Command said that it struck nine targets in two places that it claimed were affiliated with Iranian-backed groups as a response to several attacks on US personnel in Syria in the past 24 hours.
- An Israeli drone strike on a small cafe in the Israeli-designated humanitarian zone in al-Mawasi, Khan Yunis killed 11 people including five minors and injured dozens.
- A car-ramming attack in the vicinity of al-Khader wounded two Israelis.
- Israeli air strikes killed at least 20 Palestinians in Nuseirat refugee camp.

=== 12 November ===
- The Gaza Health Ministry reported that at least 62 Palestinians were killed in Israeli attacks in the past 48 hours, increasing the Palestinian death toll in Gaza to 43,665.
- The Lebanese Health Ministry announced that 44 people were killed in Israeli attacks in Lebanon a day prior.
- The Islamic Resistance in Iraq said that it launched drones towards an IDF target in the "south of the occupied territories".
- The IDF announced that four soldiers of the 900th Brigade were killed while fighting in Beit Lahia, bringing the IDF death toll in Gaza to 375.
- The IDF called on the residents in areas of Haret Hreik, Ghobeiry, Lailaki and Hadath to evacuate. Later, at least 13 Israeli air strikes hit the southern suburbs of Beirut.
- The IDF said that COGAT, in cooperation with international aid organisations delivered hundreds of food and water packages to Jabalia and Beit Hanoun. It claimed that 741 aid trucks were delivered since October to northern Gaza through the Erez Crossing. International aid organizations in a joint statement accused Israel of failing to meet the US demands for allowing more humanitarian aid for Gaza and said that conditions are worse than at any point since the start of war.
- The NNA reported that the outskirts of Yater and Zibqin were subjected to artillery shelling using incendiary phosphorus shells.
- Al-Masirah reported that the United States and the United Kingdom launched air strikes targeting a civilian car in As Sawma'ah District and the Al Faza area in at-Tuhayta district.
- Hezbollah claimed that its air defense unit forced an Israeli Elbit Hermes 450 drone to leave Lebanese airspace by confronting it above Nabatieh Governorate.
- The IDF said that it opened the Kissufim Crossing in the vicinity of Khan Yunis for facilitating food, water, medical supplies, and shelter equipment delivery to central and southern Gaza.
- The IDF told residents to evacuate from 14 villages in southern Lebanon to the north of the Awali River.
- A Hezbollah drone struck a kindergarten in Nesher, causing slight damage.
- An Israeli strike on a group of Palestinians waiting for aid killed 12 people and injured several others.
- An Israeli air strike on an overcrowded area in the vicinity of al-Noor Mosque in the western part of Deir el-Balah killed at least six people including two infants.
- The IDF called on people in an evacuation centre and a school sheltering hundreds of Palestinians in Beit Hanoun to flee southwards.
- Israeli forces shot dead a Palestinian man in a checkpoint in the vicinity of Deir Sharaf. The IDF said that the man was armed with a knife and tried to stab soldiers in the checkpoint.
- Hezbollah fired a barrage of ten rockets at the Western Galilee, killing two men in Nahariya and injuring two others in Kabri.
- The Houthis said that it targeted a US aircraft carrier in the Arabian Sea using cruise missiles and drones and targeted two American destroyers in the Red Sea with ballistic missiles and drones. The Pentagon confirmed a Houthi attack on two American destroyers while transiting the Bab-el-Mandeb and said that its warships shot down drones and missiles launched by them, adding that it was unaware of any attack against a US aircraft carrier.
- An Israeli drone strike on a tent in Deir el-Balah killed two people and injured several people including children.
- An Israeli air strike in Joun killed 15 people including eight women and four children and wounded 12 others.

=== 13 November ===
- The Gaza Health Ministry reported that at least 47 Palestinians were killed in Israeli attacks in the past 24 hours, increasing the Palestinian death toll in Gaza to 43,712.
- The Lebanese Health Ministry announced that 78 people were killed in Israeli attacks in Lebanon a day prior.
- The US Central Command said that it conducted strikes against a weapons storage and logistics headquarters facility of an Iranian-backed group after an attack on American personnel one day prior.
- The NNA reported that Israeli fighter jets conducted a series of strikes in the southern suburbs of Beirut, hitting Dar al-Hawra Medical Centre in Harek Hreik several times after issuing evacuation orders for the area and in Ghobeiry. The IDF said that it struck weapons depots and command headquarters of Hezbollah.
- The Islamic Resistance in Iraq said that it launched two drone strikes on Israel.
- Israeli settlers burned a number of vehicles owned by Palestinians in the East Jerusalem neighbourhood of Sheikh Jarrah.
- Israel Hayom reported that senior IDF officers said that there is "procrastination" for presenting a probe of the October 7 attack. It also reported that the IDF justifies the delay by pointing to the tense operational situations in the north in the last few months.
- A nine-year-old girl died from serious injuries sustained in an Israeli strike on a tent two days prior which killed her parents. Her brother was also seriously wounded.
- The IDF issued evacuation orders for areas of Bourj al-Barajneh and Dahieh. Later, Israeli air strikes hit the areas.
- An employee was charged by the US government for the alleged leak of classified documents on Israel's preparation for attacking Iran.
- Israeli air strikes on a house and in the Israeli-designed safe zone in al-Mawasi killed at least eight Palestinians and trapped several others under the rubble.
- An Israeli air strike on a home in the Jabalia refugee camp killed at least 10 Palestinians including children.
- Hezbollah claimed that its drones hit Kirya IDF base in Tel Aviv, saying that it was the headquarters of the Israeli war cabinet and general staff, as well as a war management room and the IAF's war control and supervision authority.
- Haaretz reported that the IDF was preparing to stay in Gaza until at least the end of 2025.
- Wafa reported clashes between locals and the IDF in Beit Ummar after the latter demolished several Palestinian structures, including two houses. It also reported that Israeli settlers seeking to take over areas surrounding Ras Ain al-Auja cleared the land and destroyed properties.
- The IDF detained Esra Ghorani, a female reporter of Wafa and a crew of the Palestinian Broadcasting Corporation crew in an IDF checkpoint in Tayasir after they covered the demolition of a home by the IDF in Kardala.
- SANA reported that Israeli strikes targeted Al-Qusayr and said that Syrian air defences intercepted "hostile" targets above the Homs countryside and the strikes caused "significant damage". Israel said that it was conducting strikes to decrease the transfer of weapons from Iran via Syria to Hezbollah in Lebanon, which it said had spread to Al-Qusayr.
- Six Israeli soldiers from the Golani Brigade's 51st Battalion were killed and one was injured during a shootout with four Hezbollah fighters in southern Lebanon, who were also killed.
- An IDF raid on a home in Ezbet al-Jarad, east of Tulkarm killed people and injured two others including a two-year-old child.
- The US Central Command said that it hit multiple Houthi weapons storage facilities in Yemen on 9 November and 10 November.
- An Israeli strike hit a tent serving as shelter for orphans and street vendors, killing two people.
- An Israeli strike on a house in northern Gaza killed three siblings aged below six.
- European Union foreign policy chief Josep Borrell proposed suspending political dialogue with Israel due to the war in Gaza.
- An Israeli strike in Joun killed Sakina Mansour Kawtharani, a radio journalist of al-Nour, her two children and other members of the family.
- An Israeli air strike on a tent in Israeli-designated safe zone in al-Mawasi, Khan Yunis wounded several people and damaged Médecins Sans Frontières's clinic.

=== 14 November ===
- The Gaza Health Ministry reported that at least 24 Palestinians were killed in Israeli attacks in the past 24 hours, increasing the Palestinian death toll in Gaza to 43,736.
- The Lebanese Health Ministry announced that 16 people were killed in Israeli attacks in Lebanon a day prior.
- The Islamic Resistance in Iraq said that it launched drone strikes on a "vital target" in northern Israel.
- Haaretz reported that the IDF will investigate whether at least 16 strikes in northern Gaza violated international law.
- The IDF issued evacuation orders for areas of Haret Hreik, Bourj al-Barajneh, Chouaifet and Ghobeiry highlighting some buildings saying that they are Hezbollah infrastructure. Later, an Israeli drone strike hit in the vicinity of Rawadat al-Shahedain in Ghobeiry and an Israeli missile strike hit Choueifat. The IDF said that its air strikes targeted weapons storage of Hezbollah.
- A one-year-old boy died in the Al-Aqsa Martyrs Hospital due to lack of medical supplies after a WHO request to allow him to leave the Gaza Strip was rejected by the IDF.
- The IDF claimed to have killed 200 Hezbollah militants and destroyed over 140 Hezbollah rocket launchers in the last week. It said that its strikes on offensive capabilities of Hezbollah on 13 November and 12 November killed the operations head of a Hezbollah battalion, the head of a battalion anti-aircraft unit of Hezbollah and a company commander in the Redwan force.
- The UN Special Committee to investigate Israeli practices found that the IDF's war methods in Gaza is consistent with genocide. Israel denied the claim.
- An Israeli drone strike on a group of people taking a delivery of commercial trucks in Maghazi refugee camp killed five people.
- Hezbollah claimed to have inflicted casualties on Israeli soldiers in the eastern outskirts of Markaba with a missile.
- The IDF said that it struck over 30 Hezbollah sites in Dahieh over the past two days, including command centers and weapon depots.
- Gaza Civil Defence said that "around 30 people, all civilians" were injured in the Israeli strikes in Gaza City, Jabalia and Rafah.
- The NNA reported that Israeli soldiers and Hezbollah fighters were engaged in violent clashes in the outskirts of Aitaroun towards Ainata and said that there were confirmed casualties among the Israeli soldiers.
- Israeli bombardment of Al-Hebbariyah killed a farmer.
- An Israeli strike on a residential building in Mazzeh and another Israeli strike on a residential building in Qudsaya killed 23 people including seven civilians. Israeli Army Radio said that the strikes targeted assets and headquarters of PIJ. PIJ confirmed the death of two of its leaders and a group of its caders.
- Israeli shelling in Jabalia killed at least 10 Palestinians, mostly women and children.
- An Israeli drone strike on a tent sheltering displaced people in Bureij refugee camp killed at least four Palestinians including children.
- Two Palestinian children were injured by Israeli gunfire in Beit Furik.
- An Israeli platoon commander of the Golani Brigade's 51st Battalion was killed and two other soldiers were wounded during a shootout in southern Lebanon.
- Two Israeli soldiers were moderately injured in a Hezbollah drone attack on Eliakim.
- At least two unknown gunmen fired around 30 shots toward a UNIFIL patrol near Qalaouiyah after it discovered an ammunition cache, causing no casualties.
- A Human Rights Watch report said that the IDF's forced displacement of hundreds of thousands of Palestinians amounts to crimes against humanity. The IDF accused Human Rights Watch of "blatant misrepresentations" and "factual distortion".
- An Israeli strike in Arabsalim killed six people, including five paramedics.
- Haaretz reported that Israeli police suspect that Netanyahu's chief of staff, Tzachi Braverman, attempted to manipulate the timelines of the former's conversation on October 7 surrounding the October 7 attacks to his military secretary Avi Gil to make it favourable for Netanyahu.
- An Israeli airstrike on a civil defense center in Duris, Lebanon killed at least 15 people. A separate strike in the city killed eight, including five women, and injured 27.
- Israeli forces destroyed a mosque in the Israeli-Arab Bedouin village of Umm al-Hiran in the Negev in a plan approved by the far-right National Security Minister Itamar Ben Gvir.

=== 15 November ===
- The Lebanese Health Ministry announced that 59 people were killed in Israeli attacks in Lebanon a day prior.
- The Gaza Health Ministry reported that at least 28 Palestinians were killed in Israeli attacks in the past 24 hours, increasing the Palestinian death toll in Gaza to 43,764.
- An Israeli strike on a residential apartment in the central part of Deir el-Balah killed three people including a woman and her daughter.
- The IDF issued evacuation orders for residents in parts of Ghobeiry and Bourj el-Barajneh. Later, Israeli air raids were reported in the area. The IDF said that it struck targets including Hezbollah command centers. It also claimed to have struck and destroyed a rockets stockpile and 15 launchers in southern Lebanon used for firing projectiles towards central Israel two day prior.
- The IDF claimed to have hit a Hezbollah command centre in Nabatieh Governorate. It said that the IAF hit over 120 Hezbollah targets throughout Lebanon in the past day, including weapons storage facilities, command centres and a large number of rocket launchers used for striking northern Israel.
- Wafa reported that Israeli soldiers stormed a family house in Qalqilya and assaulted one of its inhabitants. It also reported that soldiers smashed the family's furniture and took gold jewellery.
- An Israeli artillery strike on a house in Rafah killed two people including a woman.
- Israeli Army Radio reported that Israeli defense minister Israel Katz decided to approve 7,000 conscription orders for Haredi Jews.
- A rocket launched from Lebanon to Haifa Bay area hit a construction site, slightly injuring a man. Hezbollah said that it targeted Tira al-Carmel IDF base in southern Haifa.
- A rocket barrage launched from Lebanon towards Haifa area and the Western Galilee injured three male foreign workers.
- The IDF said that its drone strike killed a group of gunmen in Shejaiya neighborhood of Gaza City including Yasser Ghandhi, who infiltrated into Israel and participated in the October 7 attack.
- The IDF said that it killed Muhammad Abu Sakhil, the operations chief of PIJ.
- The IDF claimed that the IAF in coordination with Shin Bet killed Alkaman Abed Elslam Khalil Anbar, the commander of a PIJ brigade situated in Gaza City.
- The IDF issued evacuation order for residents of some buildings in Haret Hreik, Hadath, Mount Lebanon and those adjacent to it. Later, two Israeli air raids struck Hadath.
- SANA reported an Israeli strike in Mezzeh.
- Hezbollah claimed to have inflicted casualties among a group of Israeli soldiers by hitting them using a dive bomber drone.
- A soldier from the Golani Brigade's 13th Battalion was killed during a shootout with a Hezbollah fighter in a building in southern Lebanon. The latter was also killed during the shootout.
- Two Israeli soldiers were injured in Gaza while seven others were injured in southern Lebanon.
- The al-Qassam Brigades (Hamas) claimed that it killed three Israeli soldiers at point-blank range near Abbas Kilani roundabout, north of Beit Lahia.
- Wafa reported that Israeli soldiers damaged belongings in several houses without making arrests in al-Ein refugee camp, western Nablus.
- Israeli forces killed a Palestinian man who attempted to flee from north Gaza to central Gaza.
- The family of Al Jazeera cameraman Fadi al-Wahidi who is in a coma after being shot in the neck while reporting the Israeli ground invasion of the Jabalia refugee camp launched a hunger strike to allow his evacuation from Gaza after Israeli authorities rejected appeals from three media freedom organisations.
- An Israeli air strike destroyed a home in Ain Qana killing five people including a woman and her three children.
- Wafa reported that Israeli settlers put up a caravan on land belonging to Palestinians in Masafer Yatta while conducting attacks on residents.
- Israeli authorities demolished the Palestinian al-Bustan Association office in the Silwan neighborhood of East Jerusalem.
- An artillery shell hit a UNIFIL base in Chamaa without exploding, causing minor damage to its gym. Initial reports blamed Israel, however an investigation by the IDF determined that the shell was launched by Hezbollah.
- A shooting allegedly involving the Israeli Border Police killed a female Australian-Palestinian dental student in West Bank.

=== 16 November ===
- The Gaza Health Ministry reported that at least 35 Palestinians were killed in the past 24 hours, increasing its count of the Palestinian death toll in Gaza to 43,799.
- Al Jazeera reported that an Israeli air strikes hit residential buildings near Musab bin Omair Mosque in Beit Lahia causing casualties, including children.
- Al Jazeera reported that Palestinian fighters attacked Israeli forces in Jenin and used an explosive device against Israeli forces in the Old City of Nablus.
- An Israeli strike in Borj Rahal killed a paramedic and wounded seven others.
- Al Jazeera reported that the IAF struck a group of Palestinians in Beit Lahia, killing three people including civilians.
- The IDF issued an evacuation order for residents of two buildings in Haret Hreik. Later, an Israeli strike hit the area. The IDF said that its fighter jets under the direction of the intelligence division hit Hezbollah infrastructure.
- The Islamic Resistance in Iraq said that it launched drones towards "a vital target" in Eilat twice.
- The Khan Yunis municipality announced that it ran out of fuel.
- The IDF issued evacuation orders for residents in parts of Haret Hreik, Ghobeiry and Burj el-Barajneh. Later, an Israeli air strike hit the southern suburbs of Beirut.
- The IDF issued evacuation orders for residents of Tyre, highlighting 14 buildings. Later, a series of Israeli air strikes hit Tyre.
- Al Jazeera reported that an Israeli drone struck a civil defence team in Arnoun-Kfar Tebnit road in Nabatieh Governorate killing at least one paramedic, injuring four others and leaving two paramedics missing.
- Hezbollah claimed that it hit a gathering of Israeli soldiers adjacent to an IDF checkpoint in Avivim with kamikaze drones.
- Al Jazeera reported that an Israeli drone strike on a group of people in Rafah killed seven people including civilians and injured several others.
- Al Jazeera reported that a child died from injuries sustained in an Israeli air strike on a tent housing displaced families in the al-Mawasi area in southern Gaza, an Israeli-designated humanitarian zone.
- The IDF said that approximately 80 rockets were launched from Lebanon towards Israel. It also said that it struck over 160 militant targets in Lebanon and Gaza in the past day.
- Al Arabiya reported that an Israeli airstrike on Abu Assi School used for housing displaced families in Al-Shati refugee camp killed at least 10 people including women and children and wounded at least 20 others.
- Two rockets were launched from northern Gaza towards Israeli communities surrounding Gaza.
- An Israeli soldier who was a sniper in the Kfir Brigade was killed by a sniper in Beit Lahia.
- The IDF said that its soldiers killed numerous militants, dismantled militant infrastructure sites, and located a large amount of weapons during their operation in Rafah in the last day.
- The NNA reported that Israeli soldiers reached their deepest point in Lebanon by capturing a strategic hill in Chamaa before retreating after intense clashes with Hezbollah fighters. Hezbollah said that its fighters ambushed Israeli soldiers in Chamaa and claimed to have inflicted casualties.
- Al Jazeera reported that an Israeli strike in al-Khraiba, Baalbek region killed at least six people including three children and injured 11 others including five children.
- The Houthis said that it attacked a "vital target" in Eilat using drones.
- Hezbollah claimed to have set an Israeli Merkava tank in Chamaa on fire using a guided missile.
- A Hezbollah rocket barrage hit a synagogue in Haifa. The IDF said that it wounded two civilians. However, Magen David Adom said that it located "no victims" from rocket shrapnel, while five civilians were mildly wounded while rushing to shelter. Hezbollah said that it targeted IDF bases in Haifa and its vicinity.
- Wafa reported that a Palestinian journalist died from injuries sustained from an Israeli drone strike in Jabalia refugee camp.
- A father of a female Lebanese midfielder said she was critically injured when an Israeli strike hit a house in Shiyah neighborhood of Beirut.
- A rocket launched from Lebanon hit an agricultural area in the vicinity of Tamra killing several animals and heavily damaging buildings and vehicles.
- The UN said that 109 truck with aid were looted violently in the Gaza Strip using guns and grenades.

=== 17 November ===
- The Gaza Health Ministry reported that at least 47 Palestinians were killed in Israeli attacks in the past 24 hours, increasing the Palestinian death toll in Gaza to 43,846.
- The Lebanese Health Ministry announced that 29 people were killed in Israeli attacks in Lebanon a day prior.
- An Israeli strike on a home in Bureij refugee camp killed at least 10 Palestinians including a child and injured several others including children. The IDF said that it is operating to dismantle military capabilities of Hamas.
- The IDF issued evacuation orders for three areas in the southern suburbs of Beirut including Burj el-Barajneh and Chiyah. The NNA reported that Israeli jets destroyed a 12-storey residential building in Chiyah. It also reported Israeli strikes in Burj el-Barajneh and Hadath.
- An Israeli strike on a home in Nuseirat refugee camp killing at least six Palestinians including four women and a child.
- An Israeli strike on a multi-storey residential building in Beit Lahia killed at least 50 people and dozens more were injured including children and trapped others under the debris. The IDF said that it carried out several strikes on militant targets in the area.
- The IDF said that it killed hundreds of militants during its operation in Beit Lahia, Beit Hanoun and Jabalia.
- The IDF issued evacuation orders for areas of Haret Hreik.
- At least two other children were killed in different areas across central Gaza.
- The Palestinian Authority's Minister of Transport and Communications Tariq Zourob said that at least 300,000 tonnes of "solid waste" are reportedly on the streets in the Gaza.
- An Israeli strike on a building containing the headquarters of the Lebanese branch of the Ba'ath Party in Ras al-Nabaa neighborhood of Beirut Central District killed Mohammad Afif, media relations chief of Hezbollah. The Lebanese Health Ministry said that a total of seven people were killed including a woman and 16 others were injured including two children in the strike. Hezbollah confirmed that four other members of its media relations department died alongside Afif.
- An Israeli strike hit a Lebanese Army post in al-Mari, Hasbaya District, killing two Lebanese soldiers and injuring three others, one of them seriously.
- Two soldiers of the Kfir brigade, including a nephew of former IDF Chief of Staff Gadi Eisenkot, were killed and another was seriously wounded in a firefight with Hamas operatives in Beit Lahia, bringing the IDF death toll in Gaza to 378.
- The Houthis claimed to have successfully conducted drone strikes on a number of IDF and other "vital targets" in Jaffa and Ashkelon.
- The Gaza Civil Defense Agency said that an Israeli drone targeted a group of unarmed people waiting for aid, killing six Palestinians in Khan Yunis.
- An Israeli airstrike on an electronics store in the Mar Elias, Beirut killed three people including a woman and injured 29 others.
- A 13-year-old boy was wounded after Hezbollah fired 15 rockets towards northern Israel.
- Hezbollah claimed to have inflicted casualties on crew of an Israeli Merkava tank in the Tyre Harfa-Jbeen triangle by destroying it using a guided missile.

=== 18 November ===
- The Gaza Health Ministry reported that at least 76 Palestinians were killed in Israeli attacks in the past 24 hours, increasing the Palestinian death toll in Gaza to 43,922.
- The Lebanese Health Ministry announced that 35 people were killed in Israeli attacks in Lebanon a day prior.
- The Islamic Resistance in Iraq said that it launched a drone strike on a "vital target" in Eilat.
- Israeli strikes on an Islamic Health Association Centre in Houmine El Tahta and a health centre in the village of Hanaway killed two paramedics. Another Israeli strike on an ambulance center in Bazouriyeh injured two more paramedics.
- An Israeli strike on a tent sheltering displaced people in Israeli-designated safe zone of al-Mawasi, Khan Yunis killed at least five people including two children and injured several others including a child.
- Palestinian fighters clashed with Israeli forces in Balata refugee camp.
- Israeli strikes in Nabatieh Governorate killed at least six paramedics.
- Families of American victims of the 7 October attacks filed a lawsuit in a district court in Washington DC accusing Iran of culpability in the Hamas-led attack due to its funding of Hamas.
- An Israeli strike on a home in the vicinity of al-Jalaa Street in the west of the Gaza City killed seven people including three children and two women and wounded several others.
- Israeli soldiers seized four water networks owned by Palestinian farmers in Khirbet al-Deir.
- An Israeli strike on a home in the vicinity of Kamal Adwan Hospital killed at least 17 people.
- Israeli soldiers fired on a vehicle in Masafer Yatta, injuring a Palestinian woman on her hand. The IDF said that woman attempted to run over soldiers.
- An Israeli strike in Nuseirat refugee camp killed four people, including a woman and a child.
- A Hezbollah rocket struck a multi-story building in Shfar'am killing a woman and injuring 10 others. Separate rocket barrages on northern Israel injured two people.
- In the evening, a Hezbollah missile hit exactly on the administrative border between Ramat Gan and Bnei Brak in front of one of the towers in a district of high-rise office towers, injuring six people, one seriously. It was later reported that an IDF interceptor hit that missile at high altitude but failed to detonate it.
- The Gaza interior ministry said that security forces in cooperation with tribal committees killed over 20 gang members involved in stealing UN aid trucks in the Gaza. UN spokesman Stephane Dujarric said that only 11 of the 109 trucks in the convoy reached their destination.
- The IDF announced that an airstrike in southern Lebanon killed the commander of Hezbollah's medium-range rocket unit.

=== 19 November ===
- The Gaza Health Ministry reported that at least 50 Palestinians were killed in Israeli attacks in the past 24 hours, increasing the Palestinian death toll in Gaza to 43,972. The Gaza Government Media Office said that 17,492 of the dead were children.
- The Lebanese Health Ministry announced that 28 people were killed in Israeli attacks in Lebanon a day prior.
- The Islamic Resistance in Iraq said it launched a drone strike on a "vital target" in southern Israel.
- Hezbollah rockets damaged several houses and vehicles in Kiryat Shmona.
- Palestinian armed groups clashed with Israeli forces in Jenin and the Jenin refugee camp. The Jenin Brigades said that it targeted an IDF bulldozer using an explosive device. The IDF said that it killed at least three Palestinian gunmen.
- A Hezbollah rocket strike injured seven people in central Israel.
- Israeli artillery shelling hit a house in the vicinity of Nuseirat refugee camp, killing an infant.
- The director of Kamal Adwan Hospital, Hussam Abu Safiya said that malnutrition cases had started to arrive at the hospital, mostly children and the elderly, because of famine.
- The Israel Border Police said it had fired at a suspicious man in the Shuafat checkpoint north of Jerusalem, moderately injuring him.
- A reservist of the Golani Brigade's logistics unit was killed and three others were seriously injured in a Hezbollah drone strike in southern Lebanon, increasing the IDF death toll since the invasion of Lebanon to 53.
- The IDF said that it conducted more than 150 strikes against Hezbollah targets throughout Lebanon including 25 weapons depots and approximately 30 rocket launchers since 17 November.
- An Israeli strike on a group of Palestinians queuing for water in front of a school in Beit Lahia killed a child and wounded eight others. Another Israeli strike in Gaza City killed a Palestinian journalist.
- The Houthis said that they launched a missile strike towards a vessel in Red Sea. Later, the Turkish Foreign Ministry denounced Houthi missile strikes on Panama-flagged dry cargo ship Anadolu S, belonging to a Turkish company, while sailing near the coast of Yemen.
- Israeli forces demolished Al-Shiyah Mosque in Jabal Mukaber neighbourhood of East Jerusalem after issuing a demolition order.
- The Al-Quds Brigades said that it targeted a group of Israeli soldiers and vehicles using mortar shells near Jabalia Services Club, in the center of Jabalia refugee camp.
- The UNIFIL said that four Ghanaian peacekeepers were injured when a rocket that was most likely launched by "non-state actors" hit their base in Ramyah. In a separate incident, eight rockets struck an Italian UNIFIL headquarters in Chamaa. The IDF blamed Hezbollah for both attacks.
- An Israeli airstrike hit a Lebanese Army position in Sarafand killing three soldiers and injuring 17 others, including civilians.
- The Palestine Red Crescent Society said that Israeli soldiers used Palestinian paramedics as human shields in the West Bank.
- The Al-Quds Brigades said that it targeted Israeli soldiers using mortar rounds south of Juhor ad-Dik.
- An Israeli air strike on a residential building in Beit Lahia killed at least eight Palestinians, injured several others and trapped several others under the debris. Witnesses said that it was housing members of a family and displaced civilians.
- The IDF destroyed water tanks and sewage systems in Kamal Adwan Hospital for the 10th time. Israel's Coordinator of Government Activities in the Territories said that it send 1,000 units of blood to Kamal Adwan Hospital, which the UN health cluster confirmed.
- The French foreign ministry announced that an UN peacekeeping patrol in Lebanon comprising French soldiers came under fire.

=== 20 November ===
- The Gaza Health Ministry reported that at least 13 Palestinians were killed in Israeli attacks in the past 24 hours, increasing the Palestinian death toll in Gaza to 43,985.
- The Lebanese Health Ministry announced that 14 people were killed in Israeli attacks in Lebanon a day prior.
- An Israeli air strike in Jabalia al-Balad killed 12 Palestinians and at least 10 others went missing.
- An Israeli strike destroyed the roof and upper floors of a building of Kamal Adwan Hospital.
- Israeli forces raided Jenin, triggering clashes with Palestinian fighters.
- Israeli settlers set fire to cars owned by Palestinians in al-Mazraa al-Gharbiya village in the West Bank.
- An Israeli strike in Sabra neighborhood of Gaza City killed a Gaza Civil Defense worker and injured three Gaza Civil Defense workers and an Al Jazeera journalist.
- The NNA reported that Hezbollah fighters destroyed an Israeli Merkava tank in Al Bayyadah town in the vicinity of Naqoura.
- Wafa reported that Israeli soldiers arrested seven Palestinians including a 11-year-old boy from the West Bank. It also reported that they confiscated a vehicle and vandalised property while raiding houses in Abu Falah.
- An Israeli soldier from the Nahshon Battalion of the Kfir Brigade was killed, while the commander of the Nahshon Battalion was critically wounded while fighting in northern Gaza.
- An Israeli strike hit a Lebanese army vehicle in a road between Burj al-Muluk and Al-Qlaiaah, killing a Lebanese soldier and injuring another.
- Kamal Adwan Hospital director Hussam Abu Safiya said that an elderly man died due to starvation in northern Gaza.
- Israeli strikes in Palmyra killed 108 Iran-backed fighters, including four from Hezbollah, and injured 21 others including seven civilians.
- Israeli shelling in Khirbet al-Adas town in the vicinity of Rafah killed at least two people including an elderly man and injured several others.
- The IDF announced that it attacked over 100 Hezbollah targets in Lebanon including launchers, facilities used for storing weapons, command centres, and military structures one day prior. It also announced that the IAF killed the commanders of its anti-tank missile unit and operations unit in the coastal area on 17 November.
- An Israeli air strike in Israeli-designated humanitarian zone of al-Mawasi in Khan Yunis killed seven Palestinians including three children.
- During a shootout with two Hezbollah militants, a soldier and Zhabo Erlich, an armed civilian researcher wearing an IDF uniform were both killed. Erlich had entered southern Lebanon in breach of IDF procedures, accompanied by the Golani Brigade's chief of staff Col. Yarom, reportedly to see the Chamaa fortress. Two others were injured, namely the brigade's chief of staff and a company commander from the brigade's 13th Battalion. Both militants were also killed. Erlich was posthumously given a military rank.
- A reservist from the Maglan commando unit was killed following a building collapse in southern Lebanon.
- An Israeli strike in Sheikh Radwan neighbourhood of Gaza City killed 22 people, including 10 children.
- An Israeli strike on a residential neighbourhood in Beit Lahia in the vicinity of Kamal Adwan Hospital killed 66 people, mostly women and children, injured over 100 others and trapped three disabled people including a blind girl under the debris.
- Hezbollah fired a barrage of 25 rockets at the western Galilee, with one striking a kindergarten fence in Acre.
- An Israeli strike on a school serving as shelter for displaced people in the Nuseirat refugee camp killed seven people including two women and three children.

=== 21 November ===
- The Gaza Health Ministry reported that at least 71 Palestinians were killed in Israeli attacks in the past 24 hours, increasing the Palestinian death toll in Gaza to 44,056. The IDF said that it killed more than 17,000 militants.
- The Lebanese Health Ministry announced that 25 people were killed in Israeli attacks in Lebanon a day prior.
- The IDF issued evacuation orders for residents for Tyre, as well as Burj al-Shamali, Mashouq and al-Haush villages in Tyre district to move to north of the Awali river. Israeli warplanes then struck al-Haush and Tyre.
- Senator Bernie Sanders introduced three resolutions in the US Senate for halting the sale of some US weapons for Israel which failed to pass, garnering 20 votes among its 100 members.
- Israeli authorities charged three Palestinians accused of planning to assassinate the far-right Israeli National Security Minister Itamar Ben Gvir.
- An Israeli quadcopter strike injured six Palestinians, including two children in the Bureij refugee camp.
- The IDF issued two evacuation orders for residents of Hadath and Haret Hreik, including one centred on three buildings. At least 12 Israeli strikes hit Haret Hreik.
- The IDF said that it killed nine militants during a two-day raid in Jenin. It claimed that those killed were participants in attacks on Israeli communities, IDF sites or soldiers. It added that it destroyed dozens of explosives and four explosive laboratories, and arrested several people suspected of militant activity.
- A rocket strike from Lebanon killed a man in Nahariya.
- An IDF soldier from the Givati Brigade was killed in Jabalia.
- The International Criminal Court issued arrest warrants for the leader of the Al-Qassam Brigades, Mohammed Deif, Israeli prime minister Benjamin Netanyahu and former Israeli defence minister Yoav Gallant.
- The IDF said that a ballistic missile was launched from Yemen towards Israel.
- The Islamic Resistance in Iraq said that it launched a drone towards southern Israel.
- Six medical staff of Kamal Adwan Hospital were wounded, including one seriously after being hit by grenades dropped by an Israeli drone when they rushed to its emergency gate where a group of people were hit by an Israeli strike. Its water tanks and oxygen station were also significantly damaged.
- The Gaza Civil Defense Agency said that 15 children and women were hospitalized after being poisoned by eating canned food allegedly left behind by Israeli soldiers in Shujaiya neighbourhood of Gaza City.

=== 22 November ===
- The Lebanese Health Ministry announced that 62 people were killed in Israeli attacks in Lebanon a day prior.
- An Israeli air strike hit a tent serving as shelter for displaced people in al-Mawasi, killing a woman, her daughter and another child.
- Palestinian armed groups said that they opened fire and set off explosive devices targeting Israeli soldiers during their raid in the Old City of Nablus.
- Three people were wounded in a stampede while people rushed to bomb shelters in Haifa and Krayot after five rockets crossed into northern Israel from Lebanon.
- The IDF issued evacuation orders for civilians in Taybeh, Aadshit al-Qusayr and Deir Siriane to immediately move to the northern side of the Awali river.
- The IDF issued evacuation orders for residents of Borj El Chmali, Ma’shouq and a number of buildings in Haret Hreik. Later, Israeli fighter jets launched four strikes targeting Haret Hreik and al-Hadath in Beirut's southern suburbs.
- The IDF issued evacuation orders for residents of buildings near a building highlighted for strike in Tyre. Later, an Israeli strike hit the building.
- The IDF and Shin Bet claimed to have killed five Hamas militants including Jihad Mahmoud Yahya Kahlout, a Nukhba forces company commander, and Muhammad Riad Ali Oukal, a Hamas company commander who participated in the 7 October attack in an air strike in Beit Lahia one day prior. Hamas said that Israeli attacks in Beit Lahia killed a total of 112 people, including 64 children and women.
- The IDF and Shin Bet claimed to have killed Khalid Abu Daqqa, commander of PIJ's rocket unit responsible for launching rockets towards Israel during the 7 October attack and during the war who participated in many other attacks on Israel and Israeli soldiers in a strike in Deir al-Balah. The IDF also claimed that he operated from the Israeli-designated humanitarian zone in Deir al-Balah.
- An Israeli strike hit a fishing boat near the coast of Gaza City, killing a Palestinian fisherman and injuring another.
- The Gaza Health Ministry said that Kamal Adwan Hospital ran out of electricity and oxygen after Israeli strikes hit its oxygen station and generators. An infant died in an incubator due to the shortage.
- An Israeli strike hit an ambulance in Deir Qanoun Ras al-Ain, killing two Hezbollah affiliated paramedics.
- Israeli defence minister Israel Katz announced an end to the use of administrative detention against Israeli settlers in the West Bank.
- The IDF said that its airstrikes in southern Lebanon destroyed approximately 45 Hezbollah rocket launchers in this week.
- The IDF issued evacuation orders for residents in Mansouri, Iskenderun, Majdal Zoun, Bayut Al-Sayyad Farm and Al-Haush in Lebanon to move to the north of the Awali river and issued another evacuation order for Chiyah, highlighting two buildings. An Israeli missile destroyed a multistory building in Chiyah.
- Israeli strikes in Qatrani, Jezzine District killed three paramedics from the Islamic Health Association.
- Two rockets likely fired by Hezbollah hit a UNIFIL base in Chamaa, slightly injuring at least four Italian peacekeepers.
- Hezbollah claimed that its drone hit Israeli forces in Yarin.
- The Gaza Health Ministry said that all hospitals in Gaza will stop or cut services within two days due to lack of fuel.
- Hezbollah claimed to have forced an Israeli warplane to leave Lebanese airspace by confronting it using "appropriate weapons” opposite Sidon.
- The IDF issued evacuation orders for all residents of Hadath, Haret Hreik and Ghobeiry, highlighting three buildings.
- The IDF said that its fighter jets launched a wave of strikes on Hezbollah targets including command headquarters, intelligence infrastructure, weapons depots, observation posts and military buildings in Tyre.
- An Israeli strike in the Baalbek area killed seven people including the director-general of Dar al-Amal University Hospital.
- The IDF entered the town of Deir Mimas and set up road blocks around the area with heavy clashes reported.
- An Israeli airstrike in Syria killed Ali Musa Daqduq, a senior Hezbollah militant and one of the planners of a raid in 2007 that killed five US soldiers during the Iraq War.
- Hezbollah fired approximately 80 rockets at northern Israel.

=== 23 November ===
- The Gaza Health Ministry reported that at least 120 Palestinians were killed in Israeli attacks in the past 48 hours, increasing the Palestinian death toll in Gaza to 44,176.
- The Lebanese Health Ministry announced that 25 people were killed in Israeli attacks in Lebanon a day prior.
- At least seven people, including children were killed and several others were injured in an Israeli strike on a building in the Zeitoun neighbourhood of Gaza City.
- Palestinian fighters targeted Israeli forces using an explosive device in the old Askar Camp.
- Israeli soldiers assaulted Palestinian paramedics in Osarin and detained a female paramedic.
- At least nine people including children was killed in an Israeli strike in the Sheikh Nasser area, east of Khan Yunis.
- Hezbollah released two photos of what it claimed as its guided missiles hitting two Israeli tanks.
- An Israeli airstrike on a building in Basta area of Beirut Central District targeting Hezbollah official Muhammad Haydar killed at least 29 people and injured 67 others including women. The target was reportedly not present in the building. The IDF claimed to have struck a command center of Hezbollah.
- The IDF issued evacuation orders for residents in parts of Hadath, Choueifat and Al-Amrousieh to move at least 500 metres. Israeli forces conducted strikes in Hadath and in Choueifat approximately one hour later.
- An Israeli drone strike killed two fishermen in Tyre.
- Israeli settlers attacked Palestinian houses in the outskirts of the al-Dubbat neighbourhood of Beit Furik.
- An Israeli artillery strike killed three people including a woman and her child in Bureij refugee camp.
- The IDF detained 15 Palestinians including minors from the West Bank in the past two days.
- A bombardment hit Kamal Adwan Hospital, resulting in 12 injuries among hospital staff. The IDF denied responsibility for the attack.
- Hezbollah claimed to have inflicted casualties on Israeli soldiers heading towards al-Bayada.
- Hezbollah claimed to have hit Israeli soldiers in Deir Mimas and Khiam using rockets and missiles in three separate strikes.
- The IDF said that it killed a group of Hamas militants including a sniper in Jabalia and released the footage of its strike on a building housing the sniper. It said that it also destroyed Hamas infrastructure and located dozens of weapons.
- Two rockets were launched from the southern side of Deir el-Balah towards Israel.
- Israeli forces arrested two people, including a minor from Kafr Abbush.
- Hamas claimed that an Israeli female hostage was killed and another Israeli female hostage was seriously injured in an area attacked by Israeli forces in northern Gaza.
- An Israeli air strike on a residence in Shmestar killed eight people, including four children, and wounded nine others, four of them seriously.
- A group of Israeli settlers stormed an Islamic cemetery in Hebron. They also marched through the Old City of Hebron, climbed to rooftops of residents and yelled slurs, such as "Death to Arabs". A settler threw a rock in the direction of a Palestinian documenting the incident.
- The al-Qassam Brigades said that it targeted an IDF engineering infantry force consisting of five soldiers using an antipersonnel shell and hit an armoured troop carrier using a Yassin-105 shell in the vicinity of the Burj Awad junction in Rafah. It also said that Palestinian fighters hit a Nimr armoured vehicle in the as-Saftawi area north of Gaza City and launched an anti-fortification shell towards soldiers holed up in a home in the area.
- The IDF issued evacuation orders for several neighbourhoods in Khan Yunis, saying that rockets were launched from the area towards Israel.
- At least five Israeli settlers suspected of chasing Central Command Major-General Avi Bluth and Israeli soldiers accompanying him, were arrested in Hebron. Israeli settlers also threw stones at soldiers in the vicinity of Nablus and an Israeli settler punched a soldier after they stole a vehicle of Palestinians. Five settlers were arrested in that incident.
- Hezbollah claimed that it shelled Israeli forces in Chamaa.
- SANA reported that Israeli forces targeted the Jusiyah crossing in al-Qusayr, Syria, causing minor material damage.
- The IDF claimed that it hit a Hezbollah military headquarters in Dahieh.
- Hezbollah claimed that it inflicted casualties among the crew of two Merkava tanks using guided missiles on the eastern outskirts of al-Bayada and Al Jabin. Hezbollah claimed that its drone hit the headquarters of the Golani Brigade Command, north of Acre.
- Israel settlers from Havat Maon outpost attacked the house of Palestinian activist Hafez al-Harini in Tuwanah village in Masafer Yatta, injuring two people. Israeli soldiers who backed the settlers arrested Harini. Another attack on a house in a village in the same area extensively damaged property.
- An Israeli air strike in Ain Baal killed at least two people and injured four paramedics.
- The al-Qassam Brigades released a video showing detonation of an improvised explosive device in the vicinity of a raiding IDF vehicle in the West Bank.
- A soldier from the Golani Brigade's 13th Battalion was seriously injured in southern Lebanon.
- An Israeli strike in Khan Yunis killed at least seven people including three Palestinian children and wounded another person.
- Shrapnel from a bomb dropped by an Israeli quadcopter injured Hussam Abu Safia, director of Kamal Adwan Hospital on his leg.

=== 24 November ===
- The Gaza Health Ministry reported that at least 35 Palestinians were killed in Israeli attacks in the past 24 hours, increasing the Palestinian death toll in Gaza to 44,211.
- The Lebanese Health Ministry announced that 84 people were killed in the latest reporting period of 24 hours.
- The IDF issued evacuation orders for Shujayea neighborhood of Gaza City.
- An Israeli strike on a home in Bureij refugee camp killed four people including two children.
- Israeli soldiers opened fire during a raid in the Balata refugee camp, injuring a Palestinian boy.
- The IDF issued evacuation orders for residents of East Zotar, West Zotar, Arnoun, Yahmar and Al-Qasiba.
- A gunman wounded three Jordanian police officers by firing at a police patrol in the vicinity of the Israeli embassy in Amman. The gunman was shot dead by police.
- An Israeli strike on a residential building in Nuseirat refugee camp killed six people including children.
- Prime Minister Benjamin Netanyahu's office announced that Zvi Kogan, an Israeli man who went missing in UAE, was found murdered. His office condemned his death as a "heinous antisemitic terrorist act". UAE arrested three people suspected in his killing.
- An Israeli strike hit a Lebanese army centre in Al-Amiriya on the Al-Qalila-Tyre road killing a Lebanese soldier and injuring 18 others. The IDF apologized for the attack.
- At least 250 rockets were launched from Lebanon towards Israel. There were at least six instances of direct impact in five different places, including two IDF sites. Totally, some 10 Israelis were wounded, including one critically.
- The IDF called residents in parts of the southern suburbs of Beirut to evacuate. Israeli strikes hit the Kafaat area approximately an hour later.
- The al-Qassam Brigades said that it targeted an IDF vehicle containing an infantry group of 10 soldiers north of Awad Tower in Rafah using a 105mm al-Yassin rocket and inflicted casualties.
- Al Jazeera reported that Hezbollah fighters forced the IDF to retreat from the strategic al-Bayyaada hill.
- The IDF issued evacuation orders for residents in certain buildings in Ghobeiry and Bourj el-Barajneh. Later, Israeli strikes hit the area.
- The IDF claimed that it struck 12 Hezbollah military headquarters including its intelligence headquarters and its coastal missile unit.
- Hezbollah claimed to have destroyed six Merkava tanks in southern Lebanon.
- Israeli strikes hit the Kamal Adwan Hospital for a seventh consecutive day.
- The Netanyahu government sanctioned Israeli left wing newspaper Haaretz for publishing articles critical of the war in Gaza.
- The Islamic Resistance in Iraq said that it fired two drone strikes on targets in southern Israel.

=== 25 November ===
- The Gaza Health Ministry reported that at least 24 Palestinians were killed in Israeli attacks in the past 24 hours, increasing the Palestinian death toll in Gaza to 44,235.
- The Lebanese Health Ministry announced that 14 people were killed in the past 24 hours.
- Israeli forces shot dead two people including a 13 year old Palestinian boy in Ya'bad.
- The IDF claimed that in coordination with Shin Bet, it killed Halim Abu Hussein, a key Hamas militant in a battalion in western Jabalia who was responsible for many attacks against Israeli soldiers operating in Gaza with rockets and mortars and several other Hamas militants in a strike in the weekend.
- The IDF issued evacuation orders for residents of Halta to move to areas north of the Awali River.
- The IDF issued evacuation orders for residents in Haret Hreik. Later, the IDF conducted air strikes in the area, saying that it hit several Hezbollah command centres.
- The IDF issued evacuation orders for residents of four buildings in Beirut's southern suburbs. Later, Israeli air strikes hit the area. The IDF said that its strikes in Nabatieh, Baalbek, the Beqaa Valley, southern Beirut and its outskirts hit approximately 25 Hezbollah targets including its Executive Council's command centres, and intelligence control and collection centres containing Hezbollah commanders and operatives.
- Two people were wounded from shrapnel after Hezbollah launched a barrage of 20 rockets at the Upper and Western Galilee. Two others were wounded, one woman seriously, when ten rockets were fired at Nahariya.
- The Al-Quds Brigades claimed that it destroyed an Israeli Merkava tank in the Aslan area, west of Beit Lahia using an explosive device.
- The Gaza Government Media Office said that approximately 10,000 tents were washed away or damaged because of winter storms.
- SANA reported that Israeli strikes hit several bridges in Al-Qusayr, injuring at least two civilians and causing material losses. The IDF said that it targeted what it says as routes used by Hezbollah for smuggling Iranian weapons. It also said that it is part of efforts against Unit 4400 of Hezbollah, which is responsible for delivering weapons from Iran and its proxies to Lebanon, through Syria and Iraq.

=== 26 November ===
- The Gaza Health Ministry reported that at least 14 Palestinians were killed in Israeli attacks in the past 24 hours, increasing the Palestinian death toll in Gaza to 44,249.
- The Lebanese Health Ministry announced that 55 people were killed in Israeli attacks the past 24 hours.
- An Israeli strike in az-Zarqa area of Gaza City killed six people including women and children.
- Palestinian fighters fired on Israeli forces during an IDF raid in Jenin. Confrontations erupted between Israeli soldiers and Palestinians during an IDF raid in Balata refugee camp.
- A drone was launched from the east towards the Golan Heights.
- The IDF issued evacuation orders for residents of Beit Lahia, saying that it is becoming an active military war zone.
- Israeli soldiers raided Birzeit University and arrested students participating in a protest.
- The IDF issued evacuation orders for residents in Laylaki, Choueifat and parts of Ghobeiry, Bourj el-Barajneh and Tahouitet al-Ghadir. Later, Israeli air strikes were reported in the area. The IDF claimed to have struck six Hezbollah targets.
- The Gaza Civil Defense Agency said that it ceased its work in Gaza City after it ran out of diesel.
- The IDF arrested 16 Palestinians, including two minors from the West Bank. According to the Palestinian Prisoners’ Society, soldiers damaged the houses of those arrested and threatened them and their families.
- Israeli forces from the 91st Division raided Hezbollah sites on the eastern part of the Litani River and the Wadi Saluki area.
- An Israeli soldier from the 8163rd engineering battalion was critically injured during combat in central Gaza. Another female Israeli soldier was seriously injured by a Hezbollah drone attack in Mount Meron.
- The IDF announced that Ahmed Subhi Hazima, the head of Hezbollah's operations in Lebanon's coastal sector, was killed in an airstrike in Tyre. It claimed that he helped to plan infiltration plans into Israeli territory and was involved in launching antitank missiles towards the western Galilee.
- An Israeli strike on Al-Hurreya School serving as shelter for displaced people in the Zeitoun neighbourhood of Gaza City killed at least 13 people and injured over 40 others. The IDF said that it struck Hamas militants operating in a command and control center embedded inside the compound.
- The IDF said that it struck approximately 30 Hezbollah targets including a launcher used for firing projectiles towards Israel the previous day, facilities used for storing weapons, militant infrastructure sites, command centres, and additional launchers.
- The IDF said that it conducted a wave of strikes on 20 Hezbollah targets including 13 targets in Dahieh including an aerial defence unit centre, an intelligence centre, command centre, facilities used for storing weapons and claimed that other targets were components of financial system of Hezbollah.
- The IDF issued evacuation orders for residents in parts of Tyre and Sidon to move at least 500 metres.
- The IDF issued evacuation orders for residents of Baalbek, Kasarnaba and parts of Hadath.
- SANA reported that Israeli jets conducted an air strike on two villages in Homs Governorate.
- The IDF issued evacuation orders for residents of four locations in Central Beirut for the first time since the start of the conflict. Later, Israeli strikes were reported in the area.
- Israel approved a ceasefire agreement with Hezbollah.
- A soldier of the Kfir Brigade was killed fighting in Gaza, increasing the IDF death toll in Gaza to 381.
- The IDF said that it killed Basel Kamel Salim Nabahin, a PIJ militant who participated in the 7 October attack in an airstrike in southern Gaza.
- Lebanese transport minister Ali Hamieh said that Israeli strikes hit the Arida, Dabousieh and Jussiyeh border crossings with Syria. Syrian state media reported that four civilians and two soldiers were killed, and 12 people were injured including children, women and workers in the Syrian Red Crescent. The IDF claimed that it struck several "smuggling routes" into Syria used by Hezbollah for funneling its weapons.
- Hezbollah claimed that its drones hit IAF chief Tomer Bar's residence in Tel Aviv and other sensitive IDF targets in Tel Aviv and its suburbs.
