= Gholamreza Jalali =

Sardar Gholamreza Jalali
- غلامرضا جلالی
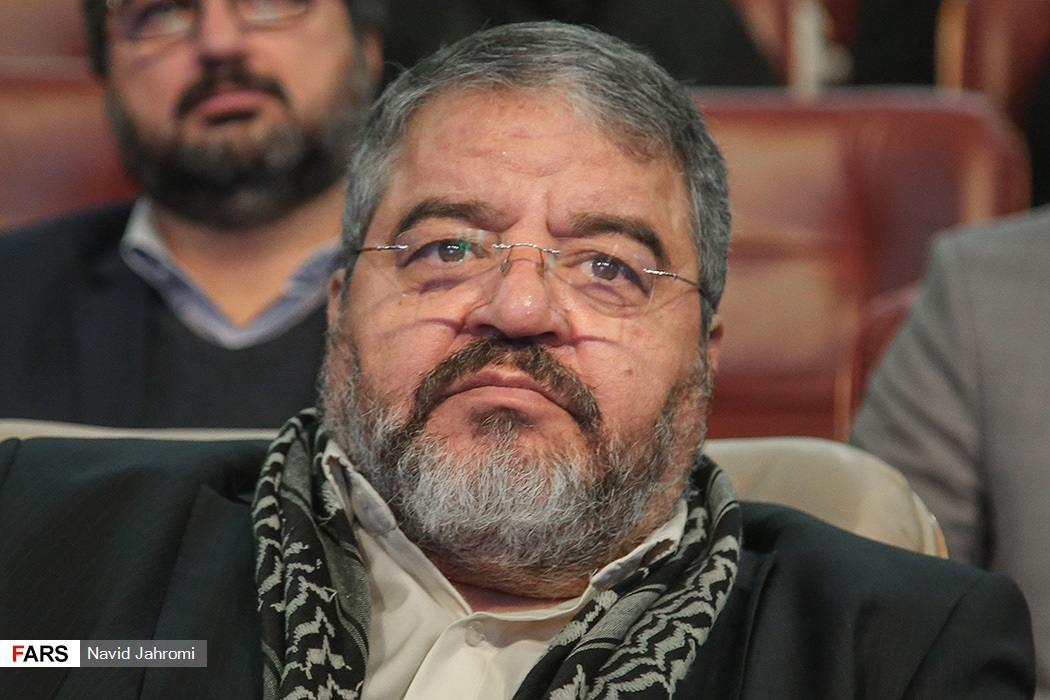
- Jalali in 2020
- Born: 1955 (age 70–71); Imperial State of Iran
- Education: Imam Hossein University; University of Tehran
- Military career
- Allegiance: Iran
- Branch: (Islamic Revolutionary Guard Corps) IRGC
- Service years: 1979–present
- Rank: Brigadier General
- Commands: National Organization for Passive Defense
- Conflicts: Iran–Iraq War

Gholamreza Jalali Farahani (Persian: غلامرضا جلالی; born 1955) is a Brigadier General of the Islamic Revolutionary Guard Corps (IRGC) who has served as the head of the country's National Organization for Passive Defense since 2005. He has also been the Special Assistant to the President of Iran for Passive Defense Affairs since 22 October 2024.

== Biography ==
He was a member of the IRGC during the Iran–Iraq War. Jalali holds a Master's degree in Architectural Engineering and a Master's degree in Defense Sciences. Before his appointment as the head of the Passive Defense Organization, he headed the Engineering Department of the Joint Staff of the IRGC. As a legal entity, he became a member of the Supreme Council for Cyberspace and the Supreme Council of the Red Crescent Society in the 13th government. In August 2012, Jalali said ahead of Al-Quds Day that Israel must be destroyed, saying, "[Al-Quds Day] is a reflection of the fact that no other way exists apart from resolve and strength to completely eliminate the aggressive nature and to destroy Israel." He added that the Muslim world is required to support the "oppressed people of Palestine" against "the Zionist usurpers", that the Islamic Revolution was a "beacon of light" and that the "Islamic front in Syria" had strengthened. In 2018 Jalali claimed that his country fended off a Stuxnet-like attack targeting the country's telecom infrastructure.
