= National Organization for Passive Defense =

Iranian government bureau for civil defense

- سازمان پدافند غیر عامل کشور
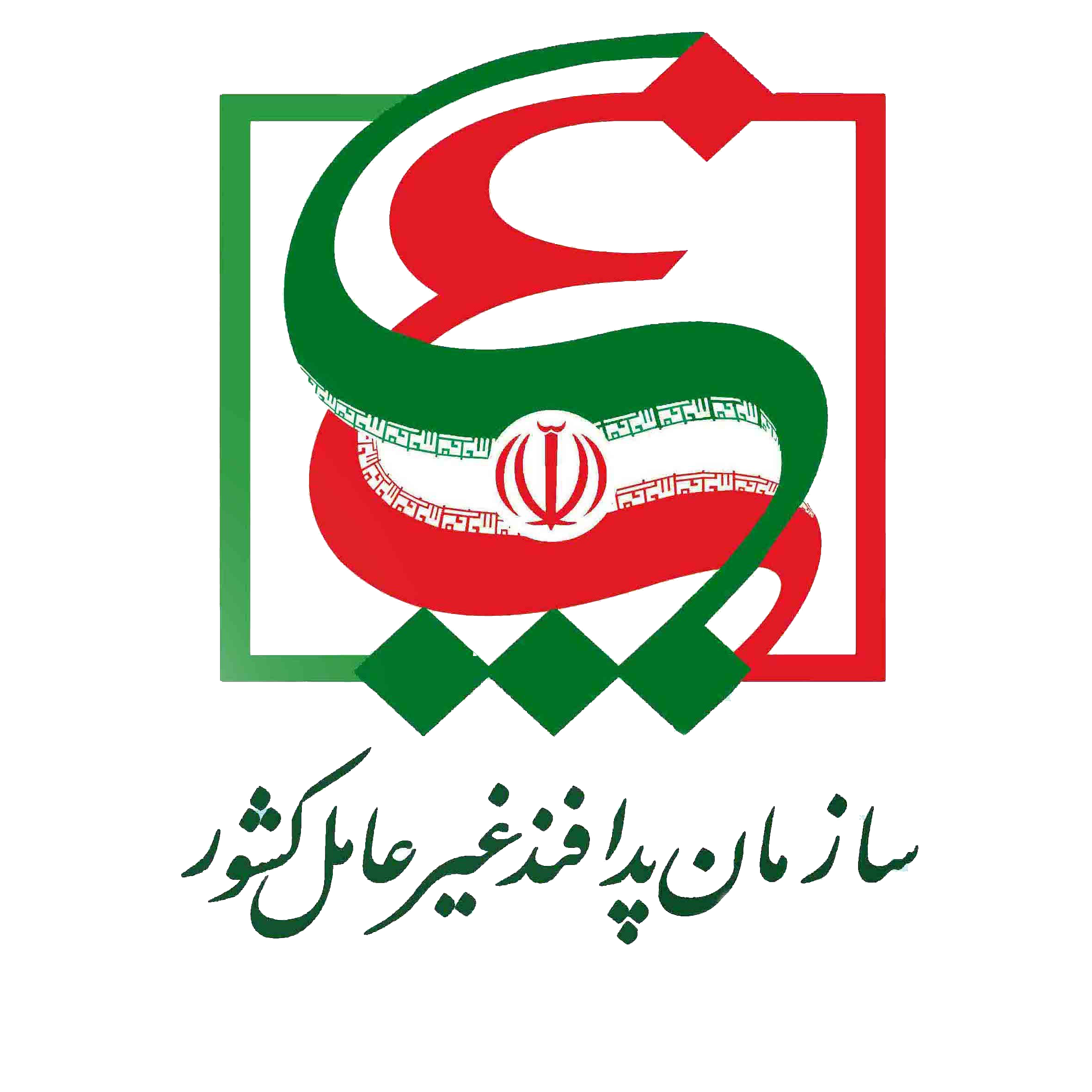
- Emblem

Agency overview
- Formed: 2003
- Jurisdiction: Government of Iran
- Agency executive: Gholamreza Jalali, Head
- Parent agency: Iranian Armed Forces General Staff
- Website: paydarymelli.ir

The National Organization for Passive Defense (Persian: سازمان پدافند غیر عامل کشور) is an Iranian government bureau for civil defense in the country. It is formally part of the General Staff of the Armed Forces of the Islamic Republic of Iran.

== History ==
The organization was established in 2003 and is headed by Gholamreza Jalali since 2005. In 2010 it was sanctioned by the European Union. In 2022 it introduced SOC, SCADA- EMS DDOS mitigation.

In 2023 it requested boycotting Europe diplomatically over Quran burning.

== Powers and responsibilities ==
Its constitution was approved by the Iranian parliament in August 2023. It is responsible for defending the Iranian infrastructure from biologic, cyber, nuclear, electronic, chemical warfare and the CBRNE threat.

It works mainly with Iranian corporations and government departments and Ministry of Defense, Ministry of Industry, and Iranian Armed Forces. It consists of a high commission council and is financed by both the government and private corporations.

== Organization chart ==
Organizational structure	
Deputy of energy	Deputy of technical and systems
Deputy of health	Deputy of infrastructure
Deputy of industrial, commerce, military complex	Deputy of research and training
Deputy of cultural	Deputy of ICT
Deputy of coordinator	Deputy of cities
Director of intelligence protection	Basij in provincial affair معاون بسیج امور استان‌های سازمان
