= List of military engagements during the Israel–Hezbollah conflict (2023–present) =

This is a list of engagements that have occurred during the Israel–Hezbollah conflict (2023–present) and the 2024 Israeli invasion of Lebanon.

Map of the Israel–Hezbollah conflict Israel Israeli-occupied Golan Heights Lebanon under Israeli control Hezbollah presence in Lebanon Syria Areas ordered evacuated by Israel

== Major engagements ==
Ongoing
Israel victory
Hezbollah victory

Name	Location	Start date	End date	Result of the battle	Sources
Battle of Odaisseh	Odaisseh, Lebanon	1 October 2024		Ongoing	
Kafr Kila clashes	Kafr Kila, Lebanon	1 October 2024			
Ayta al-Shaab clashes	Ayta ash-Shaab, Lebanon	1 October 2024			
Battle of Maroun al-Ras	Maroun al-Ras, Lebanon	2 October 2024		Ongoing	
Battle of Ramyah	Ramyah, Lebanon	11 October 2024			
Batroun Raid	Batroun, Lebanon	2 November 2024		Israeli victory	

== Attacks ==
=== Long distance attacks ===
Name	Date	Attacker	Weapons	Target
Majdal Shams attack	27 July 2024	Hezbollah	Falaq-1	
Dahieh airstrike	3 October 2024	Israeli Air Force	White phosphorus munition (allegedly)	Hashem Safieddine
Central Beirut medical center airstrike	4 October 2024	Israel Defense Forces		Medical center
Derdghaya Melkite Church airstrike	9 October 2024	Israel Defense Forces		A Melkite church in Derdghaya, Lebanon
Bachoura airstrike	10 October 2024	Israel Defense Forces	2,000-pound bombs (equipped with JDAM)	Wafiq Safa
Hezbollah drone strike on Binyamina	13 October 2024	Hezbollah	Drones	Israel Defense Forces
Aitou airstrike	14 October 2024	Israel Defense Forces		Ahmad Fakih
Attack on Nabatieh municipal council	16 October 2024	Israel Defense Forces		Nabatieh municipal council
Drone attack on Benjamin Netanyahu's residence	19 October 2024	Hezbollah	Drone	Residence of Benjamin Netanyahu and his family
Sahel Alma airstrike	19 October 2024	Israel Defense Forces		Sahel Alma, Jounieh

== See also ==
- List of military engagements during the Gaza war
