= 2024 Ramyah clashes =

2024 Israel-Hezbollah engagement

Battle of Ramyah
- Part of the 2024 Israeli invasion of Lebanon
- Israel Hezbollah presence in Lebanon Lebanese territories under Israeli control Areas ordered evacuated by Israel See here for a more detailed map.
Date	October 2024
Location	Ramyah, Lebanon
Result	Israeli victory

Belligerents
Israel	Hezbollah	UNIFIL (Note: Although UNIFIL is a peacekeeping force and is not actively engaged in hostilities, its positions have been targeted and its peacekeepers have suffered casualties.)

Commanders and leaders
(Israel) Unknown	(Hezbollah) Unknown	(United Nations) Unknown

Units involved
Israel Defense Forces; Israeli Ground Forces; Israeli Air Force	Hezbollah military; (Hezbollah) Radwan Force	(United Nations) (Indonesia) Garuda Contingent

Casualties and losses
(Israel) 50 dead Per Hezbollah: (Israel) 3 IDF Caterpillar D9 bulldozers destroyed (Israel) 10 Merkava tanks destroyed	(Hezbollah) Unknown	(United Nations) 20 peacekeepers wounded

The battle of Ramyah was a battle in the village of Ramyah between Israel and Hezbollah, amid the 2024 Israeli invasion of Lebanon. The battle also affected UNIFIL, who have sustained numerous attacks on their facilities by the Israel Defense Forces (IDF).

== Battle ==
=== Clashes ===
On the night of 11 October 2024, UNIFIL reported receiving "significant damage" to its buildings in Ramyah due to explosions from nearby shelling.

On 13 October, two Israeli Merkava tanks destroyed the main gate of a UNIFIL post in Ramyah and forcibly entered the post. Two hours later, Israeli forces fired rounds 100 meters from the base that caused smoke to rise and enter the camp, injuring 15 UNIFIL peacekeepers due to skin irritations and gastrointestinal reactions. The IDF claimed that during the incident, 25 of its soldiers were injured, including two "seriously injured", due to anti-tank missiles fired by Hezbollah. The IDF said that it fired a smoke screen to aid the evacuation of its wounded troops, and that it had "maintained continuous contact" with UNIFIL.

On 15 October 2024, Hezbollah said that it destroyed three bulldozers and two tanks belonging to the IDF that were attempting to advance into the outskirts of Ramyah by using a guided missile, which resulted in casualties. Hezbollah also reported that its fighters used artillery shells to target Israeli forces near Ramyah.

On 16 October 2024, Hezbollah reported that it hit an Israeli tank with a guided missile near Ramyah.

=== Demolition ===
On 20 October 2024, Israeli forces blew up the entirety of the town of Ramyah. A verified video that circulated on social media showed Israeli soldiers cheering and counting down before blowing up a large part of the town. Satellite imagery showed that at least 40 buildings were destroyed. According to reports, Ramyah has almost been wiped off the map, and barely any structures still stand.

== Israeli withdrawal ==
On 11 January 2025, Israeli forces reportedly withdrew from Ramyah. The Lebanese Army deployed to the village shortly after.
