= Battle of Maroun al-Ras =

Battle of Maroun al-Ras may refer to:

- Battle of Maroun al-Ras (2006), a battle of the 2006 Lebanon War
- Battle of Maroun al-Ras (2024), a battle during the 2024 Israeli invasion of Lebanon
