= List of military engagements =

List of military engagements may refer to:

- List of military engagements of World War I
- List of military engagements of World War II
- List of military engagements of the Second Sino-Japanese War
- List of military operations of the Vietnam War
- List of engagements during the Myanmar civil war (2021–present)
- List of military engagements during the Russian invasion of Ukraine
- List of engagements during the Sudanese civil war (2023–present)
- List of military engagements during the Israel–Hamas war
- List of military engagements during the Israel–Hezbollah conflict (2023–present)
