= 2024 drone attack on Benjamin Netanyahu's residence =

Attack on the Israeli Prime Minister's house

- Part of Israeli–Lebanese conflict
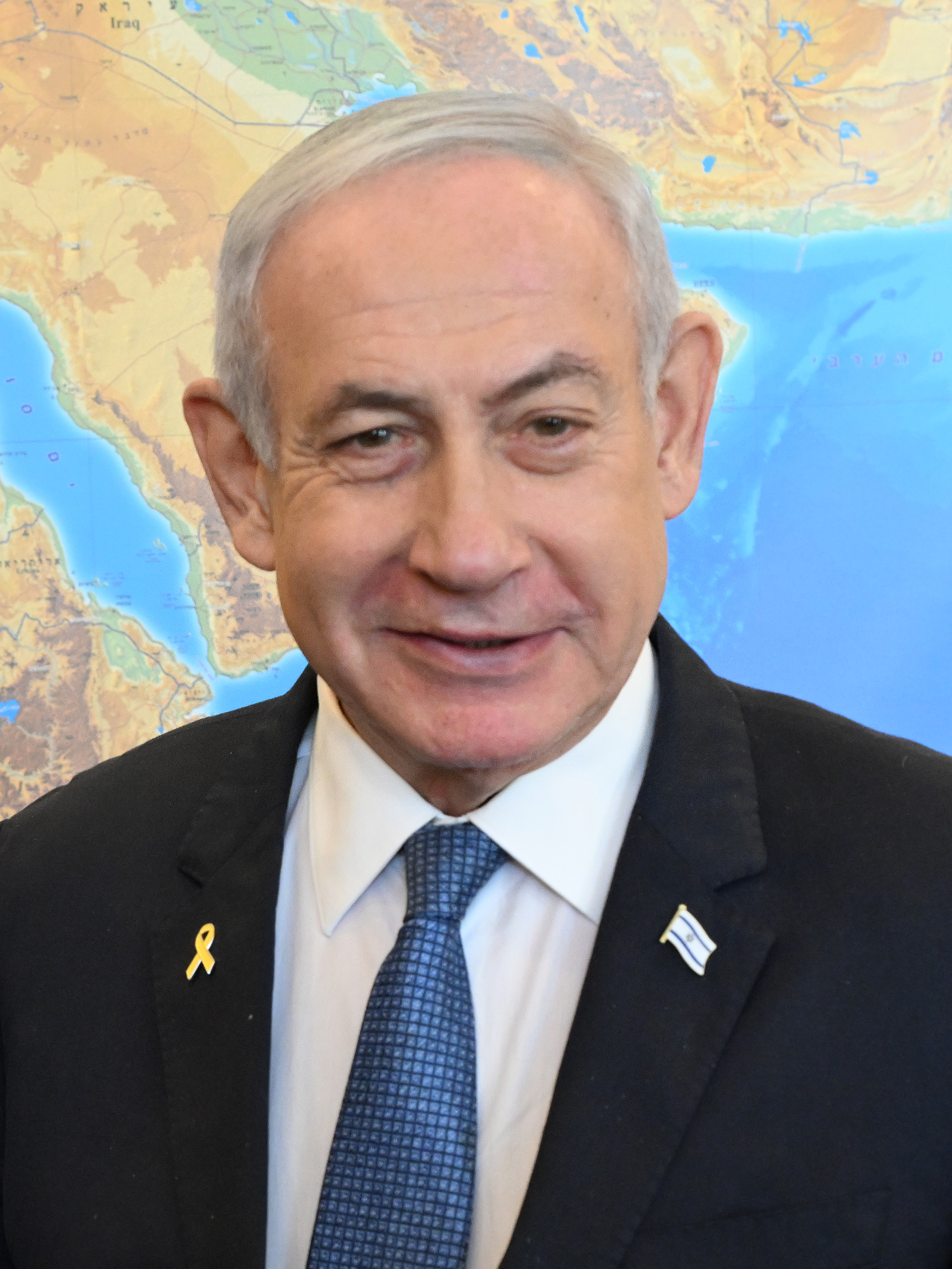
- Benjamin Netanyahu on 22 October 2024, three days after the drone strike
- Location: Caesarea, Haifa District, Israel
- Date: 19 October 2024
- Target: Residence of Benjamin Netanyahu and his family
- Attack type: Attempted assassination by drone strike
- Deaths: None
- Perpetrator: Hezbollah

On 19 October 2024, during the 2024 Israeli invasion of Lebanon, Lebanese militant group Hezbollah conducted a drone attack on the private residence of Israeli prime minister Benjamin Netanyahu in Caesarea, Israel. Netanyahu was not home during the attack, and it did not result in any injuries. The attack was referred to as an assassination attempt by several news outlets and by Netanyahu himself and was suspected to have been launched from Lebanon.

== Attack ==
On 19 October 2024, Lebanese militant group Hezbollah launched three drones from Lebanon. Two were intercepted over Rosh Hanikra and Nahariya, while the third attacked Benjamin Netanyahu’s private home in Caesarea. The drone cracked a bedroom window but failed to penetrate further due to reinforced glass and additional protections, while debris landed on a swimming pool and the yard.

The attack came amid heightened tensions between Israel and Hezbollah, with several rockets and drones fired toward areas in northern Israel. The attack did not result in any injuries, and Netanyahu was not at his residence at the time.

Al Jazeera reporter Nour Odeh reported that prior to the strike, areas in northern Israel witnessed several rocket attacks by Hezbollah, and sirens were activated in cities such as Haifa and the Galilee, which she stated could have acted as decoys prior to the attack on Netanyahu's residence. She reported that sirens had gone off around Caesarea only after the attack on Netanyahu's residence was confirmed.

== Responses ==
=== Israel ===
Netanyahu called the attack an attempted assassination targeting he and his wife Sara conducted by Iranian proxies, stating that they had "made a bitter mistake". He further stated that the attack would not hinder or dissuade Israel from "the war of revival" against Israel's enemies and to ensure Israel's security for generations.

Israeli foreign minister Israel Katz also stated that the attack was an assassination attempt against Netanyahu and his family conducted by Iranian proxies, and called the attack another exposure of "Iran’s true face and the evil axis it leads".

The Prime Minister's Office requested $530,000 from the state treasury to undertake security upgrades after the attack.

=== Axis of Resistance ===
Iran stated that Hezbollah was responsible for the reported attack, according to the state-run Islamic Republic News Agency, which quoted Iran's mission to the UN stating, "The action in question has been carried out by Hezbollah in Lebanon."

Hezbollah stated that it had conducted multiple rocket strikes across north and central Israel on the same day of the attack, although it did not explicitly state that it was responsible for the drone attack on Netanyahu's residence. Hezbollah later claimed responsibility for the attack on 22 October 2024.

Al Jazeera reporter Nour Odeh called the attack a matter of concern for Israeli security forces, due to the fact that the drone successfully struck its intended target 70 kilometers (43 miles) away from the Lebanese border without triggering any sirens.

=== International ===
United States Secretary of Defense Lloyd Austin, after receiving information regarding the attack from Israel's Minister of Defense Yoav Gallant, was reported to have been "relieved" that Netanyahu survived, and began to review adjustments to United States operations in the Middle East, including the deployment of a Terminal High-Altitude Area Defense system to bolster Israeli defense against the Axis of Resistance.

British Prime Minister Sir Keir Starmer held a call with Netanyahu following the attack, expressing alarm at the use of drones.

== See also ==
- 2024 Hezbollah drone strike on Binyamina
- 2024 Houthi drone attack on Tel Aviv
- October 2024 Bachoura airstrike
- October 2024 central Beirut medical center airstrike
