= 2024 Kafr Kila clashes =

2024 Israel-Hezbollah engagement

Battle of Kafr Kila
- Part of the 2024 Israeli invasion of Lebanon
- Israel Hezbollah presence in Lebanon Lebanese territories under Israeli control Areas ordered evacuated by Israel See here for a more detailed map.
Date	October 2024
Location	Kafr Kila, Lebanon
Result	Israeli victory

Belligerents
Israel	Hezbollah

Commanders and leaders
(Israel) Lt. Col. Moran Omer	(Hezbollah) Hacher Ali Tawil †

Units involved
Israel Defense Forces; Israeli Ground Forces; 36th Division; Israeli Air Force	Hezbollah military; (Hezbollah) Redwan Force

Casualties and losses
(Israel) 25+ soldiers wounded	(Hezbollah) 1 fighter captured

The 2024 Kafr Kila clashes began in the southern Lebanese village on 1 October 2024, amid the Israeli invasion of Lebanon.

== Background ==
Before the battle. Kafr Kila was attacked by the IDF over 300 times during cross-border clashed with Hezbollah. On 1 October 2024, Israel began an invasion of Lebanon as part of the 2023–2024 Israel–Hezbollah war and the Israel–Hezbollah conflict, results of the spillover of the Gaza war. It began after Hezbollah faced a series of setbacks in September 2024 that degraded its capabilities and eliminated most of its leadership; beginning with the pager explosions, followed by an Israeli aerial bombing campaign targeting Hezbollah throughout Lebanon, killing over 800 and injuring at least 5,000 in a week, and culminating in the 27 September assassination of Hezbollah leader Hassan Nasrallah.

On October 1, 2024, the IDF claimed that since the onset of the Israel–Hezbollah conflict in October 2023 and leading up to the October 2024 ground operation, it has destroyed 158 Hezbollah targets in Kfar Kila, including 28 lookout posts and an array of weapons.

== Battle ==
On October 2, the forces of Division 36 entered Lebanon and split up, Golani's forces began to move towards Marun al-Ras and the rest of the division joined the forces inside Kfar Kila. On the same day, Hezbollah claimed to have killed or injured all members of an Israeli infantry unit sheltering in a home outside Kafr Kila by detonating an explosive device in the house and targeting it using bullets and rocket-propelled grenades.

On October 6, the IDF said that its airstrike killed Hezbollah commander Hacher Ali Tawil in Kafr Kila who was responsible for an anti-tank missile attack in Yuval which killed two Israeli civilians in January. Hezbollah claimed that the IDF made a withdrawal from Kfar Kila.

On 10 October, the Israeli Air Force, bombarded the Khula area, killing Ahmed Mustafa al-Haj Ali, who coordinated hundreds of rockets and ATGM strikes on Kiryat Shmona. In addition, Muhammad Ali Hamadan, the commander of ATGM division was also killed.

On 13 October, the IDF said that 25 soldiers of the Etzioni Brigade were injured, including two critically, while fighting in southern Lebanon including in Kafr Kila and Odaisseh. Also on 13 October, a fighter Wadah Younes, was captured during an IDF search operation in the tunnels beneath the village.

On 16 October, Israeli tanks fired at a UNIFIL watchtower in Kafr Kila. UNIFIL called the attack "deliberate fire on a UNIFIL position" and reported that the watchtower was damaged, along with two cameras. The U.S State Department therefore threatened to cut off Israel's military support and thereby allowed more aid transport trucks to enter Gaza.

== Israeli withdrawal ==
On 18 February 2025, Israeli forces withdrew from Kafr Kila following the expiration of the extended deadline of the Israel–Lebanon ceasefire agreement that came into effect on 27 November 2024. Lebanese residents returned to their homes, finding them largely destroyed by Israeli forces.
