= October 2024 Aitou airstrike =

Attack on Lebanon during 2024 Israeli invasion

- Part of the 2024 Israeli invasion of Lebanon
- Location within Lebanon
- Location: Aitou, Lebanon
- Date: 14 October 2024
- Target: Ahmad Fakih
- Attack type: Airstrikes, massacre
- Deaths: 23
- Injuries: 8+
- Perpetrator: Israel Defense Forces

On 14 October 2024, the Israel Defense Forces (IDF) conducted an airstrike on the Maronite Christian town of Aitou in North Lebanon, as part of the 2024 Israeli invasion of Lebanon. The airstrike killed 22 Lebanese people, including 12 women and 2 children, and wounded 8. This was the first time Israel targeted the Christian-majority region of Zgharta. Lebanese sources have referred to it as a massacre.

== Background ==
Israel began a ground invasion of Lebanon on 1 October 2024. The Israeli airstrike on Aitou took place following the Hezbollah drone attack on an IDF military barracks in Binyamina the previous day, after which Israeli prime minister Benjamin Netanyahu vowed to continue striking Hezbollah "without mercy, everywhere in Lebanon – including Beirut".

== Airstrike ==
The Lebanese National News Agency reported that the Israeli airstrike targeted a residential apartment in Aitou. The airstrike severely damaged the building, destroyed several cars and caused a large fume of thick smoke to rise. The Lebanese Health Ministry reported that at least 21 Lebanese people were killed including 12 women and two children and 8 were wounded, and that DNA tests were being conducted to identify body parts.

Although Hezbollah is mainly present in southern Lebanon and the southern suburbs of Beirut, and has little to no presence in northern Lebanon, Israel claims to have targeted senior Hezbollah leader Ahmad Fakih. The mayor of Aitou, Joseph Trad, said the building had been rented to displaced families that fled the warfare in southern Lebanon.

== Reactions ==
The UN’s human rights office has called for an investigation into the strike. Spokesman Jeremy Laurence said the strike raised "real concerns" with respect to international humanitarian law. An Amnesty International investigation stated that even if Israel was targeting Fakih, the number of civilians present "likely would make this an indiscriminate attack." They called on the incident to be investigated as a war crime.
