= 2024 Ayta al-Shaab clashes =

Battle during the Israeli invasion of Lebanon

- Part of the 2024 Israeli invasion of Lebanon
- Israel Hezbollah presence in Lebanon Lebanese territories under Israeli control Areas ordered evacuated by Israel See here for a more detailed map.
Date	October 2024
Location	Ayta ash Shab, Lebanon

Belligerents
Israel	Hezbollah

Units involved
Israel Defense Forces; Israeli Ground Forces; 98th Division; 91st Division; Israeli Air Force	Hezbollah military; (Hezbollah) Redwan Force

Casualties and losses
(Israel) Unknown (Israel) 1+ tanks destroyed	(Hezbollah) 20+ fighters killed (IDF claim)

A military engagement began on 1 October 2024 in the village of Ayta al-Shaab between Israel and Hezbollah, amid the 2024 Israeli invasion of Lebanon.

== Background ==
On 1 October 2024, Israel began an invasion of Lebanon as part of the Israel–Hezbollah conflict, results of the spillover of the Gaza war. It began after Hezbollah faced a series of setbacks in September 2024 that degraded its capabilities and eliminated most of its leadership; beginning with the pager explosions, followed by an Israeli aerial bombing campaign targeting Hezbollah throughout Lebanon, killing over 800 and injuring at least 5,000 in a week, and culminating in the 27 September assassination of Hezbollah leader Hassan Nasrallah.

The IDF said that since the onset of the Israel–Hezbollah conflict in October 2023 and leading up to the October 2024 ground operation, it had destroyed 103 "terror targets" in Ayta al-Shaab, including 51 tunnel shafts and nine rocket launchers, with tunnels reaching approximately 25 meters deep.

== Battle ==
The battle started in the Nurit between Ayta al-Shaab and the border between Lebanon and Israel. On October 1, under heavy air support by the Israeli Air Force, the 98th Division penetrated into the Nurit area. Soon the IDF troops entered the village and systematically began destroying Hezbollah's above ground and underground infrastructure including a large scale tunnel including an underground weapons warehouse, a command room, and residential quarters. The troops launched house to house search operations uncovering an underground barracks and a training grounds which were subsequently destroyed.

The troops from the 91st Division were also deployed to the village and around 20 militants were killed in the battle.

On 8 October, the village was reported to have been under Israeli control as the IDF began its second phase of operations in southern Lebanon.

On 12 October, the village residents were forced to evacuate following the extensive bombardment of the village by UAVs and aircraft. On October 14, Hezbollah claimed that its fighters killed or injured Israeli soldiers by targeting an armoured personnel carrier using a guided missile in Ayta al-Shaab. It also said that it engaged in fighting with Israeli soldiers in the village.

On 21 October, several IDF tanks entered Ayta al-Shaab, intensifying combat in the region. IDF soldiers blew up several buildings in the village.

On 24 October, Hezbollah reported that its fighters were engaged in ongoing "intense" clashes against IDF vehicles in the village. On the same day, Hezbollah said that it destroyed an Israeli tank with a guided missile, killing and wounding the soldiers inside.

== Aftermath ==
In February of 2025, Israeli forces withdrew from Ayta al-Shaab in February of 2025 following the expiration of the extended deadline of the Israel–Lebanon ceasefire agreement that came into effect on 27 November 2024. The Lebanese Army deployed to the village shortly after. Lebanese residents returned to their homes, finding them largely destroyed by Israeli forces.
