= Israeli attack on Ramyah UNIFIL post =

Attack on Ramyah UNIFIL post
- Part of the 2024 Israeli invasion of Lebanon
- Location within Lebanon
- Location: Ramyah, Lebanon
- Date: 13 October 2024
- Target: (United Nations) UNIFIL
- Attack type: Shooting
- Weapons: Two Merkava tanks and smoke screen
- Injuries: 15 UNIFIL peacekeepers
- Perpetrator: Israel Defense Forces

On 13 October 2024, two Israel Defense Forces (IDF) Merkava tanks destroyed the main entrance to a United Nations Interim Force in Lebanon (UNIFIL) post in Ramyah and forcibly entered the area. A few hours later, the IDF fired rounds nearby, causing injuries to 15 UNIFIL peacekeepers.

== Background ==
Throughout the past week, Israeli forces repeatedly fired on areas where UNIFIL peacekeepers were present. Israeli strikes wounded 5 UNIFIL peacekeepers, including two Indonesian soldiers, on 10 October and two Sri Lankan soldiers on 11 October. France, Italy, and Spain issued a joint statement condemning Israel's conduct. Sri Lanka strongly condemned Israel's attack on its soldiers. United States president Joe Biden said he was "absolutely, positively" urging Israel to stop firing at UNIFIL peacekeepers. Forty countries contributing to UNIFIL strongly condemned the Israeli attacks on peacekeepers.

A few hours prior to the incident, Israeli prime minister Benjamin Netanyahu called on UNIFIL peacekeepers to abide by Israel's evacuation orders and immediately withdraw from Lebanon, calling them "human shields" for Hezbollah. The IDF often claims that Hezbollah operates in the vicinity of the UNIFIL peacekeepers, without providing evidence. UNIFIL, with a force of 10,000 from 50 different countries, has so far refused requests from Israel to evacuate 29 positions in southern Lebanon.

== Attack ==
Early in the morning on 13 October 2024, three platoons of IDF troops crossed the Blue Line into Lebanon according to UNIFIL. At around 4:30 a.m., two IDF Merkava tanks destroyed the main gate of a post in Ramyah and forcibly entered the position. Two hours later, after the tanks left, Israeli forces fired several rounds 100 meters from the base that caused smoke to enter the camp. The smoke caused injuries to 15 UNIFIL peacekeepers due to skin irritations and gastrointestinal reactions, who required medical treatment for unusual symptoms despite wearing gas masks.

The IDF gave a different account of the incident, claiming that 25 of its soldiers were injured, including two "seriously injured" due to anti-tank missiles fired by Hezbollah. The IDF said that it fired a smoke screen to aid the evacuation of its wounded troops, and that it had "maintained continuous contact" with UNIFIL.

== Reactions ==
Following the incident, UNIFIL said "for the fourth time in as many days, we remind the IDF and all actors of their obligations to ensure the safety and security of UN personnel and property and to respect the inviolability of UN premises at all times". It also requested an explanation from the IDF for what it said were "shocking violations". UN Secretary-General António Guterres warned that any attacks against UNIFIL peacekeepers may constitute a war crime.
