= Aitou =

Village in North Governorate of Lebanon

Aitou أيطو
- Village
- Location within Lebanon
- Coordinates: 34°18′31″N 35°55′11″E
- Country: Lebanon
- Governorate: North Governorate
- District: Zgharta District
- Highest elevation: 1,300 m (4,300 ft)
- Lowest elevation: 900 m (3,000 ft)
- Time zone: UTC+2 (EET)
  - Summer (DST): UTC+3 (EEST)
- Dialing code: +961

Aitou (Arabic: أيطو, romanized: ʾAyṭū, also Ayto, Aytou, Aytu, Aïtou, Aito, Itoo) is a village located in the Zgharta District in the North Governorate of Lebanon. Its population is Maronite Catholic.

== Demographics ==
As of 2025, it is estimated that 700 people live in Aitou in about 200 houses. The people of Aitou are typically followers of the Maronite Catholic church. It is also estimated, according to some statistics, that in the U.S. there are about 14,000 immigrants from Aitou; around 6,500 of whom live in Peoria, Illinois and have formed the Itoo Society. The Itoo Society was established in 1914 for several purposes: creating and maintaining unity among the Aitou community in Peoria, maintaining strong ties to the families remaining in Aitou and providing for the general welfare of both the Aitou community in Peoria and the citizens of the village of Aitou. There are also many immigrants from Aitou who live in Venezuela, Australia, Brazil, and some European countries.

== Etymology ==
With a qāf added at the beginning, as Qaitou, the name could mean in Aramaic 'summer', 'heat' or 'boar'. It is equivalent to the Arabic qaiz (قيظ), meaning 'canicule' or 'heat wave', and to Hebrew qayits (קיץ) meaning 'summer'. It could refer to Aitou being used as a summer resort, given the town's location at a high elevation, yet only 27 km from the Mediterranean coast.

With a ghayn, thus as (Ghaithou), it could mean 'anger' or 'rage' (Arabic equivalent: غيظ).

With an aleph, as 'Aitou, it could mean 'thick', 'obscure', 'magic', in reference maybe to the thick forests or the thick fog that characterizes the summer evenings in this area.

== Geography ==
Aitou is a mountainous village, located 113 km from Beirut and 27 km from Tripoli, Lebanon. The town occupies the northern slopes of Mount Lebanon at an elevation ranging between 900 and 1300 meters above sea level.

== History ==
=== Antiquity ===
In antiquity, Aitou was famous for its oak and cedar forests. An Ancient Egyptian hieroglyphic inscription sent by Pharaoh Pepi II to one of the kings of Byblos, asking for a number of trees from the woods of the God Aitou in order to extract the resin used by the Egyptians for embalmment is indicative of the importance of the forests of Aitou in ancient times. The hieroglyphic inscription is found today at the National Museum of Beirut.

=== Ottoman period ===
After the settlement of the Maronites in Mount Lebanon in the 5th century, there was a muqaddam in Aitou counted among the Maronite leaders. The rule of the muqaddam of Aitou seems to have been limited to the nearby region till 1519.

In 1517, one year after the beginning of Ottoman rule in Lebanon, the muqaddam of Bsharri, Elias, died leaving the rule of the region to his young son Hanna, known later as Abdel Muneem. In 1519, the muqaddam of Aitou, Kamal Eddine Ibn Abdel Al-Wahhab, known as Ibn Ajramah (ابن عجرمة), profiting from the confusion and the young age of the muqaddam of Bsharri, seized the power in Jebbet Bsharri (for the meaning of Jebbet, see Hadath el Jebbeh). He was married to Sitt el-Moulouk (ست الملوك), a cousin of the muqaddam of Bsharri. Sitt el-Moulouk played an important role in the takeover out of revenge, because the family branch of her father, the Sheikh Alwan, had been evicted from power in Jebbet Bsharri previously.

In the first Ottoman census of Jebbet Bsharri done in that same year, Aitou was credited with 28 male adults, 24 of them married.

The muqaddam of Aitou, Ibn Ajramah, ruled Jebbet Bsharri for 18 years. He built a castle in Aitou and accumulated copious amounts of wealth.

In 1532, Abdel Muneem (عبد المنعم) of Bsharri succeeded in getting back the rule on half of the region from Bsharri to Hadath el-Jebbeh, and the other half from Blaouza to Aitou, staying under the rule of Ibn Ajramah of Aitou. In 1537, Abdul Muneem of Bsharri killed Ibn Ajramah of Aitou by stabbing him with his spear. The killing took place in the village of Blaouza. Ibn Ajramah was buried in Aitou behind the church of Mar Sarkis. This episode marked the end of the muqaddams of Aitou.

But the wife of Ibn Ajramah, the above-mentioned Sitt el-Moulouk, took eventually her revenge by paying mercenaries to assassinate Abdul Muneem in 1547, ending also this dynasty of Bsharri muqaddams as no male descendant was alive.

In the second Ottoman census of 1571, Aitou had 46 male adults, 40 of them being married.

=== Present day ===
On 14 October 2024, an Israeli strike during the invasion of Lebanon killed 19 people and injured 4 others.

== Landmarks ==
=== Churches ===
- Church of Our Lady of Aitou
- Church of Saint Rafqa
- Church of Saint Domitius
- Church of Saint Joseph
- Church of Saint Sergius and Saint Bacchus Saint Sarkis & Bakhos
- Church of Saint Simon

=== Monasteries ===
- Monastery of Saint Simon
- Monastery of Saint Artemios of Antioch (Challita

== Notable people ==
- Ray LaHood, U.S. Secretary of Transportation
- Joseph Hitti, bishop
- Hanna Alwan, Curial bishop of the Maronite Catholic Patriarchate of Antioch
