= Maroun al-Ras =

Maroun al-Ras مارون الراس
- Municipality
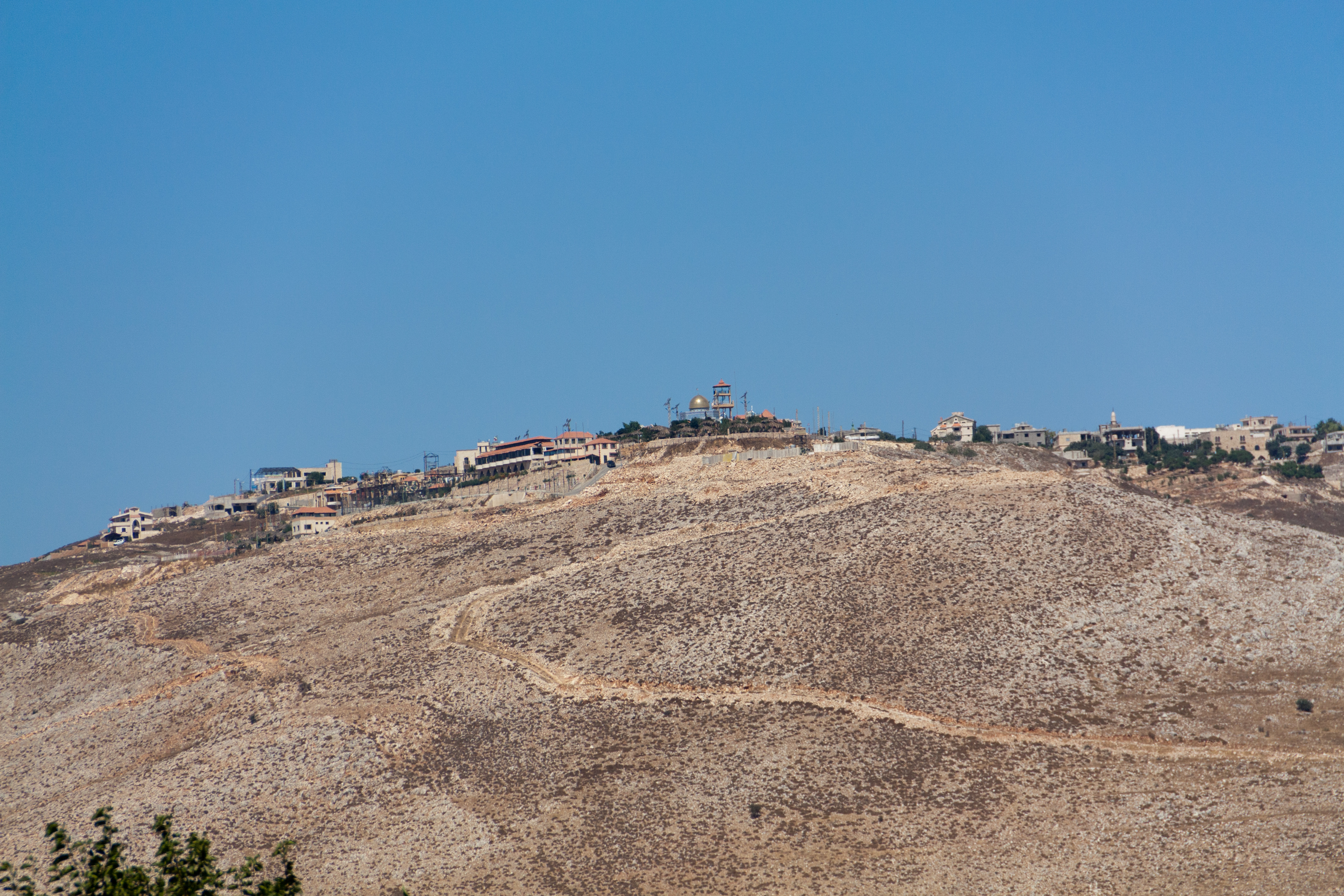
- The village of Maroun al-Ras, as seen from the Israeli side of the border, near Avivim

- Location within Lebanon
- Coordinates: 33°06′27″N 35°26′41″E
- Grid position: 191/278 PAL
- Country: Lebanon
- Governorate: Nabatieh Governorate
- District: Bint Jbeil District
- Elevation: 900 m (3,000 ft)
- Time zone: UTC+2 (EET)
  - Summer (DST): UTC+3 (EEST)
- Dialing code: +961(7)

Maroun al-Ras (Arabic: مارون الراس, romanized: Mārūn ar-Rās) is a municipality nestled in Jabal Amel (Mount Amel) in the district of Bint Jbeil in the Nabatiye Governorate in southern Lebanon. It is located around 120 km (75 mi) south east of Beirut, roughly one km (0.62 mi) from the border with Israel.

== History ==
=== Before 2006 ===
In 1596, it was named as a village, Marun er-Ras, in the Ottoman nahiya (subdistrict) of Tibnin under the liwa' (district) of Safad, with a population of 97 Muslim households. The villagers paid a fixed tax of 25% on agricultural products, such as wheat, barley, olive trees, vineyards, goats and beehives, in addition to "occasional revenues" and an olive oil press; a total of 8,960 akçe.

In 1838 Edward Robinson noted it as a village located on a higher hill than Yarun.

In 1881, the PEF's Survey of Western Palestine (SWP) described it: "A stone village, with some large stones built into walls, containing about 150 Moslems, situated on the top of high hills, with vineyards and arable land; water is obtained from 'Ain Hara, and cisterns in the village." They further noted: "At this village there are a considerable number of well-cut stones and remains, which indicate that there was once a church here similar to that at Yarun; these stones have been mostly found to the west of the village, in vineyards. A capital of a column, with mediaeval ornamentation, and a small piece of sculptured stone, with leaves and figures as at Yarun, are in the village. There is also an architrave with a Greek inscription, in three pieces."

In the 1945 statistics the population was counted with Saliha and Yaroun, and totalled 1070 Muslims with 11,735 dunams of land, according to an official land and population survey. Of this, 7,401 dunams were allocated to cereals, 422 dunams were irrigated or used for orchards, while 58 dunams were built-up (urban) area.

=== 2006 Lebanon War ===
The village was the scene of the Battle of Maroun al-Ras, a major confrontation between the Israeli Army and Hezbollah fighters during the 2006 Lebanon War. The village is at an elevation of 911 meters (2,989 feet), and is strategically important as it overlooks the surrounding towns. During the battle, the village was partly occupied by Israel, which claimed it was a stronghold for Hezbollah and one of the launching points for rocket attacks on northern Israel. There are reports that control of the village was contested at the time of the ceasefire. After-battle reports claimed the IDF troops never fully secured the border area and that Maroun al-Ras was never fully taken.

=== 2024 Israeli invasion of southern Lebanon ===
In October 2024, IDF forces operated in the village as part of its invasion of southern Lebanon. The Israeli flag was raised, after the victory.

== Demographics ==
In 2014 Muslims made up 99.68% of registered voters in Maroun al-Ras. 98.72% of the voters were Shiite Muslims.

== Bibliography ==
- Conder, C.R.; Kitchener, H.H. (1881). The Survey of Western Palestine: Memoirs of the Topography, Orography, Hydrography, and Archaeology. Vol. 1. London: Committee of the Palestine Exploration Fund.
- Department of Statistics (1945). Village Statistics, April, 1945. Government of Palestine.
- Hadawi, S. (1970). "Village Statistics of 1945: A Classification of Land and Area ownership in Palestine". Palestine Liberation Organization Research Centre. Archived from the original on 2018-12-08.
- Hütteroth, W.-D.; Abdulfattah, K. (1977). Historical Geography of Palestine, Transjordan and Southern Syria in the Late 16th Century. Erlanger Geographische Arbeiten, Sonderband 5. Erlangen, Germany: Vorstand der Fränkischen Geographischen Gesellschaft. ISBN 3-920405-41-2.
- Palmer, E.H. (1881). The Survey of Western Palestine: Arabic and English Name Lists Collected During the Survey by Lieutenants Conder and Kitchener, R. E. Transliterated and Explained by E.H. Palmer. Committee of the Palestine Exploration Fund.
- Rhode, H. (1979). Administration and Population of the Sancak of Safed in the Sixteenth Century. Columbia University. Archived from the original on 2020-03-01.
- Robinson, E.; Smith, E. (1841). Biblical Researches in Palestine, Mount Sinai and Arabia Petraea: A Journal of Travels in the year 1838. Vol. 3. Boston: Crocker & Brewster.
