= Kfar Kila, Lebanon =

Kfar Kila كفركلا
- Municipality
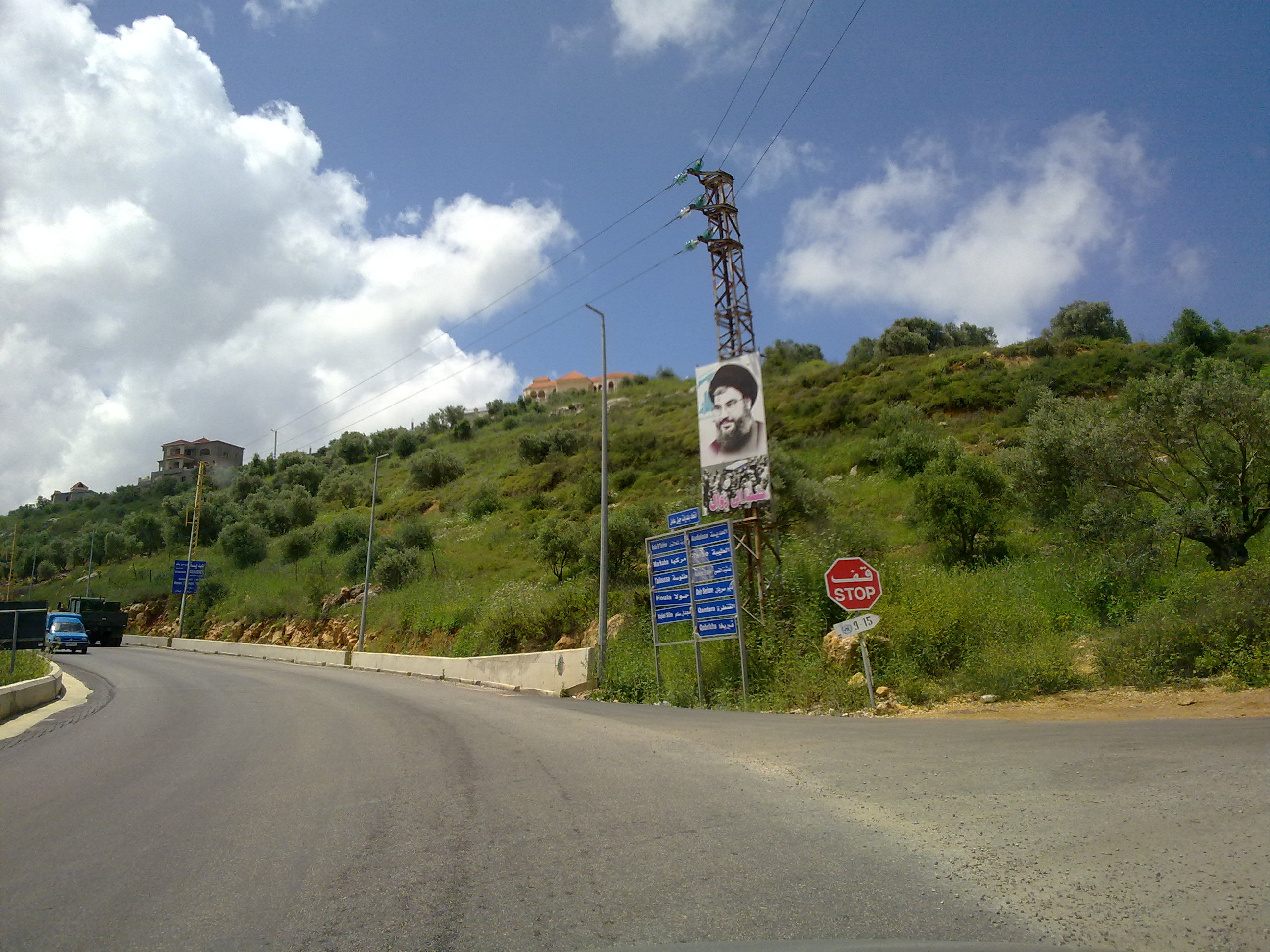
- Kfar Kila

- Location within Lebanon
- Coordinates: 33°16′44″N 35°33′20″E
- Grid position: 201/298 PAL
- Country: Lebanon
- Governorate: Nabatieh Governorate
- District: Marjayoun District
- Elevation: 400 m (1,300 ft)

Population
  - Total: 5,878
- Time zone: UTC+2 (EET)
  - Summer (DST): UTC+3 (EEST)
- Dialing code: +961

Kfar Kila or Kfarkila (Arabic: كفركلا, romanized: Kfarkilā, also Kfarkela, Kafarkela) is a municipality in Southern Lebanon. The majority of its population are Shia Muslims.

== Etymology ==
The name Kafarkila means "the village of the pasturage".

== History ==
Al-Maqdisi (c. 945/946 – 991) noted that Kafr Kila (called Kafar Kila) was "A place lying a day's march from Tabariyyah".

=== Ottoman era ===
In the 1596 tax records, it was named as a village, Kafr Kuk, in the Ottoman nahiya (subdistrict) of Tibnin, part of Safad Sanjak, with a population of 31 households and 2 bachelors, all Muslim. The villagers paid taxes on agricultural products, such as wheat, barley, olive trees, goats, beehives and winter pastures; a total of 4,700 akçe.

In 1838, Eli Smith noted Kafr Kila's population as Metawileh.

In 1875 Victor Guérin visited and noted that the village had about 1,000 Metawileh inhabitants. He further noted: "The mosque and several of the houses are built of old materials. The spring is partly ancient."

In 1881, the PEF's Survey of Western Palestine (SWP) described it as "a village, built of stone and mud, containing about 150 Moslems, situated on sloping ground, with figs, olives, and arable land around. A good spring near."

=== Modern era ===
The total population of the village is about 14,500. The occupants' number increases dramatically during summer. Its altitude is around 700 m from sea level.

Many developments are currently taking place due to the efforts and the determination of the municipality side by side with the people in order to mitigate the problems that accumulated over the years from central government indifference, civil war, occupation and border wars.

Following the 1982 Israeli invasion Kafr Kila became part of the Israeli security zone. On 11 September 1989 three IDF soldiers were wounded in an ambush in Kafr Kila. The Lebanese Communist Party claimed responsibility. Two of the attackers were killed.

During the Israel–Hezbollah conflict, much of the village's population was displaced. Israeli artillery barrages also destroyed many of the buildings. During the 2024 Israeli invasion of Lebanon, the IDF claimed it has destroyed 158 Hezbollah targets in the preceding months in Kfar Kila, including 28 lookout posts and an array of weapons. Back on October 25th almost the entire southern part of the village had been destroyed during the 2024 Kfar Kila clashes.

During the 2026 Lebanon War Israeli officials stated that 90% of the town had been completely destroyed. Despite the destruction, reports suggest some civilians plan to come back following the end of the war, even though such return is not guaranteed following Israeli reports stating that those displaced may never come back.

== Demographics ==
As of 2010, the village had 7,000 year round residents and its population rose to 9,000 during the summer months. At least 2,500 villagers had been displaced to other parts of Lebanon by the 2006 Lebanon War and another 500 had migrated abroad.

In 2014 Muslims made up 99.56% of registered voters in Kfar Kila. 99.41% of the voters were Shiite Muslims.

In April 2026 the town was reported to be roughly fully depopulated after almost the entirety of it was destroyed.

== Bibliography ==
- Conder, C.R.; Kitchener, H.H. (1881). The Survey of Western Palestine: Memoirs of the Topography, Orography, Hydrography, and Archaeology. Vol. 1. London: Committee of the Palestine Exploration Fund.
- Guérin, V. (1880). Description Géographique Historique et Archéologique de la Palestine (in French). Vol. 3: Galilee, pt. 2. Paris: L'Imprimerie Nationale.
- Hütteroth, W.-D.; Abdulfattah, K. (1977). Historical Geography of Palestine, Transjordan and Southern Syria in the Late 16th Century. Erlanger Geographische Arbeiten, Sonderband 5. Erlangen, Germany: Vorstand der Fränkischen Geographischen Gesellschaft. ISBN 978-3-920405-41-4.
- Le Strange, G. (1890). Palestine Under the Moslems: A Description of Syria and the Holy Land from A.D. 650 to 1500. London: Committee of the Palestine Exploration Fund.
- Palmer, E.H. (1881). The Survey of Western Palestine: Arabic and English Name Lists Collected During the Survey by Lieutenants Conder and Kitchener, R. E. Transliterated and Explained by E.H. Palmer. Committee of the Palestine Exploration Fund.
- Rhode, H. (1979). Administration and Population of the Sancak of Safed in the Sixteenth Century (PhD). Columbia University. Archived from the original on 2020-03-01.
- Robinson, E.; Smith, E. (1841). Biblical Researches in Palestine, Mount Sinai and Arabia Petraea: A Journal of Travels in the year 1838. Vol. 3. Boston: Crocker & Brewster.
