= 2024 Beirut medical center airstrike =

Israel bombing raid

October 2024 central Beirut medical center airstrike
- Part of the 2024 Israeli invasion of Lebanon
- Location within Lebanon
- Location: Beirut, Lebanon
- Date: 4 October 2024
- Target: Medical center
- Attack type: Airstrike
- Deaths: 9+ people, including 7 medical staff
- Injuries: 14+ people
- Perpetrator: Israel Defense Forces

On 4 October 2024, an Israel Defense Forces airstrike hit a medical center in central Beirut, amid the 2024 Israeli invasion of Lebanon, killing at least nine and injuring more than 14. Seven members of the medical staff were killed, including two medics, according to a civil defence group linked to Hezbollah. Israel said it targeted Hezbollah "assets." and allegedly used white phosphorus to attack the medical center.

== Airstrike ==
The airstrike took place in the early hours of 4 October 2024. The Israeli attack on the medical center caused a fire to erupt in an apartment in the residential Bashoura district, close to the United Nations headquarters in Lebanon, the prime minister's office, and the Lebanese parliament. The medical center, located at the second floor on a 12-storey building, belonged to the Islamic Health Organization, which was linked to Hezbollah. According to human rights experts, affiliations with Hezbollah and Amal do not affect the protected status of hospitals under international law. Israel said it targeted Hezballah "assets", but did not issue an evacuation order prior to the strike.

=== Use of white phosphorus ===
Lebanese residents reported a smell that resembled sulfur following the airstrike. The Lebanese state-run National News Agency accused Israel of an illegal use of White phosphorus munition under international law.

== Reactions ==
The strike was condemned as a violation of international law by the foreign chief of the European Union, Josep Borrell, who said the IDF had "targeted once again healthcare workers" and killed civilians in a densely populated area.
