= Battle of Odaisseh =

2024 Israel-Hezbollah engagement

- Part of the 2024 Israeli invasion of Lebanon
- Israel Hezbollah presence in Lebanon Lebanese territories under Israeli control Areas ordered evacuated by Israel See here for a more detailed map.
Date	October 2024
Location	Odaisseh, Lebanon
Result	Israeli victory

Belligerents
Israel	Hezbollah

Units involved
Israel Defense Forces; Israeli Ground Forces; 98th Division; 89th Oz Brigade; 621st Egoz Unit; Israeli Air Force; Unit 669	Hezbollah Military; Redwan Force

Casualties and losses
(Israel) 8+ soldiers killed (Israel) 48+ soldiers wounded	(Hezbollah) 30+ fighters killed (Per IDF)

The battle of Oddaiseh was a battle which took place in the village of Odaisseh in southern Lebanon in October 2024, amid the 2024 Israeli invasion of Lebanon. The battle of Oddaiseh was one of the largest engagements fought by IDF infantry during the 2024 Lebanon War, and notably consisted of Israeli special forces fighting against Hezbollah's special forces.

== Background ==
On 1 October 2024, Israel began an invasion of Lebanon as part of the Israel–Hezbollah conflict, results of the spillover of the Gaza war. It began after Hezbollah faced a series of setbacks in September 2024 that degraded its capabilities and eliminated most of its leadership; beginning with the pager explosions, followed by an Israeli airstrikes campaign targeting Hezbollah throughout Lebanon, killing over 800 and injuring at least 5,000 in a week, and culminating in the 27 September assassination of Hezbollah leader Hassan Nasrallah.

== Timeline ==
=== 1 October 2024 ===
On 1 October, Hezbollah claimed that it had targeted IDF soldiers in towns opposite of Odaisseh.

=== 2 October 2024 ===
On 2 October, Hezbollah stated that Israeli forces were ambushed by Hezbollah fighters in Odaisseh and forced to retreat while attempting to dismantle militant infrastructure. Six soldiers from the Egoz Unit were killed in the clash and several others were injured, including five critically. The IDF said that another 20 Hezbollah militants were killed during the clash.

Early in the morning on 2 October 2024, a force of the Egoz unit moved towards the village, they were observed before their arrival, and Radwan Force militants set up an ambush. Amongst the heavy fog, the Egoz Unit personnel entered one of the buildings in the village, around 04:30 in the morning, when they were attacked from several directions. Under the haze and fog, the Israeli Air Force could not provide combat support so the special operatives from the Unit 669 were deployed to rescue and evacuate the trapped personnel. At a point in the battle, the Hezbollah militants tried to kidnap the dead bodies of Egoz Unit personnel but were thwarted in this attempt. Eight Egoz fighters were killed during the fighting, including the team commander Capt. Harel Ettinger. The Redwan Force personnel entrenched themselves in a mosque which was then attacked by a UAV. In this engagement 6 Egoz Unit personnel were killed and 30 were wounded including 7 seriously, moreover IDF claimed to have killed 30 Hezbollah militants during the engagement.

Later on the same day, an ambush by Hezbollah killed two Israeli soldiers and wounded 18. According to Al Jazeera English analysts, the attack was a victory for Hezbollah. The Lebanese army said that an Israeli force crossed the Blue Line in Odaisseh and claimed they retreated after an incursion of about 400 meters.

=== 3 October 2024 ===
On 3 October, Hezbollah said that it targeted Israeli soldiers in al-Thaghra on the outskirts of Odaisseh.

=== 9 October 2024 ===
Hezbollah-affiliated sources stated that the IDF withdrew from Odaisseh and Kfar Kila.

=== 21–23 October 2024 ===
A number of buildings in Odaisseh were demolished by the Israeli military, among them a cultural centre and the family home of Lubnan Baalbaki, the conductor of Lebanon’s philharmonic orchestra. The centre was full of his father's, the artist Abdel-Hamid Baalbaki's, collection of fine art and pottery, in addition to 2,000 manuscripts and books.

=== 3 November 2024 ===
By 3 November, around 20 percent of buildings in Odaisseh were damaged.

=== 18 February 2025 ===
Israeli forces withdrew from Odaisseh on 18 February 2025 following the expiration of the extended deadline of the Israel–Lebanon ceasefire agreement that came into effect on 27 November 2024. The Lebanese Army deployed to the village shortly after. Lebanese residents returned to their homes, finding them largely destroyed by Israeli forces.
