= 2024 Hezbollah drone strike on Binyamina =

- Part of the Israel–Hezbollah conflict (2023–present)
- Type: Drone strike
- Location: Zar’it barracks, Golani Brigade Training Base, Israel
- Target: Israel Defense Forces
- Date: 13 October 2024
- Executed by: Hezbollah
- Casualties: (Israel) 4 soldiers killed (Israel) 58 wounded

On 13 October 2024, a drone launched by Hezbollah from Lebanon launched a missile at the Israeli Defense Force Golani Brigade's Zar'it barracks near the town of Binyamina, Israel. The attack injured 58 military personnel, with at least 4 killed and 7 seriously injured according to the Israel Defense Forces (IDF). The attack, part of a larger rocket barrage, saw two drones deployed, with one intercepted over the sea while the other penetrated into Israeli territory.

No alarms were triggered, and the IDF have said they are investigating the lack of warning signals. Medical teams airlifted several of the critically injured to Sheba and Rambam Medical Centers. The attack occurred amid the escalating Israel–Hezbollah conflict, which in previous months witnessed a series of Israeli airstrikes that decimated much of Hezbollah's senior leadership, including Secretary General Hassan Nasrallah. Moreover, its military arsenal and infrastructure were significantly degraded by airstrikes, which were followed by a ground invasion of Lebanon, officially aimed at weakening Hezbollah and pushing it from the Israeli-Lebanese border.

== Strike ==
On 13 October 2024, Hezbollah claimed to have launched “swarms of drones” towards Israel. The strike was part of a multi-pronged Hezbollah attack. Three drones, identified as Mirsad-1 drones, were launched at Israel. In conjunction, short-range rockets were fired at northern Israel and three precision rockets were fired at Haifa. One of the drones was shot down by the Israeli Navy and another by the Iron Dome. The third was pursued by Israeli Air Force jets and helicopters which fired at it twice but failed to shoot it down. Electronic warfare measures were deployed against it but also failed. About half an hour before the drone struck the base, it dropped off radar 48 kilometers (30 miles) northeast of Acre, and the Israeli Air Force assumed that it had crashed. An investigation into the incident found that the drone briefly appeared on radar again for a minute but was not identified as a threat. Police also informed the Israeli Air Force of reports of a suspicious aircraft over Yokneam Illit, which may have been the drone. The drone eventually crashed into a Golani Brigade training base near Binyamina, hitting the base's dining hall as dozens of soldiers were there eating dinner.

The incident resulted in 4 deaths and 58 injuries, with 40 of the 58 individuals still hospitalized the following day. Magen David Adom reported that 4 personnel were critically injured, 7 seriously, and 14 moderately. Three of the injured were airlifted to Sheba Medical Center, while two were taken to Rambam Health Care Campus. An additional 37 of the injured personnel were transported to various hospitals by ambulance.

Israeli Channel 12 reported that Hezbollah successfully deceived the Israeli air defense system by firing a barrage of missiles to cover the drone.

Hezbollah claimed responsibility for the drone strike and said it was in response to the Israeli airstrike on Bachoura on 10 October that killed 22 people and injured another 117. Hezbollah said it targeted the Israel Defense Forces' soldiers at the Tsnobar logistics base for the Golani Brigade in the Israeli-occupied Golan Heights, who were "preparing to participate in the attack on Lebanon".

== Analysis ==
The attack suggests that Hezbollah has been testing the Israeli air defense and refining its tactics during the war.

== See also ==
- 2024 drone attack on Benjamin Netanyahu's residence
- 2024 Houthi drone attack on Tel Aviv
