= 2024 Maroun al-Ras clashes =

Israel-Hezbollah engagement

Battle of Maroun al-Ras
- Part of the 2024 Israeli invasion of Lebanon
- Israel Hezbollah presence in Lebanon Lebanese territories under Israeli control Areas ordered evacuated by Israel See here for a more detailed map.
| Date | October 2024 |
| Location | Maroun al-Ras, Lebanon |
| Result | Israeli victory |

Belligerents
| Israel | Hezbollah |

Casualties and losses
| (Israel) 8+ soldiers killed (Israel) 7+ critically wounded (Israel) 3 Merkava tanks destroyed (per Hezbollah) | (Hezbollah) Unknown |

A battle took place in Maroun al-Ras in southern Lebanon in October 2024, between the Israel Defense Forces (IDF) and Hezbollah amid the 2024 Israeli invasion of Lebanon.

== Background ==
On 1 October 2024, Israel began an invasion of Lebanon as part of the Israel–Hezbollah conflict, results of the spillover of the Gaza war. It began after Hezbollah faced a series of setbacks in September 2024 that degraded its capabilities and eliminated most of its leadership; beginning with the pager explosions, followed by an Israeli aerial bombing campaign targeting Hezbollah throughout Lebanon, killing over 800 and injuring at least 5,000 in a week, and culminating in the 27 September assassination of Hezbollah leader Hassan Nasrallah.

== Battle ==
=== 2 October ===
On 2 October 2024, Hezbollah forces engaged in combat with IDF soldiers who were attempting to enter Maroun al-Ras from the east. Hezbollah claimed to have inflicted several casualties among the Israelis, and said it destroyed three Merkava tanks with guided missiles as they approached Maroun al-Ras. Israel reportedly faced stiff resistance from the Hezbollah fighters who stood ready. In a battle lasting just over an hour, Hezbollah successfully repelled an Israeli infantry unit from penetrating its defense lines. Eight Israeli soldiers were killed in combat, including three commanders, and seven others were critically wounded.

=== 3 October ===
On 3 October 2024, Hezbollah stated that it had detonated two explosive devices at dawn against a group of IDF soldiers as they attempted to infiltrate the village, causing deaths and injuries.

=== 4 October ===
On 4 October 2024, Hezbollah said that it had struck a group of Israeli soldiers near the Maroun al-Ras plain.

=== 5 October ===
On 5 October 2024, Hezbollah claimed to have hit an Israeli Merkava tank as it was advancing in the Maroun al-Ras forest area using a guided anti-armor missile, resulting in casualties.

=== 8 October ===
The IDF was filmed raising the Israeli flag in Maroun al-Ras. The Israeli flag was raised in a location where the Iranian flag previously flew. The IDF also demolished the "Garden of Iran" which had a statue of assassinated IRGC Quds Force commander Qassem Soleimani pointing at Israel and a replica of the Dome of the Rock.

== Post-battle aftermath ==
=== 18 February 2025 ===
Israeli forces withdrew from Maroun al-Ras on 18 February 2025 following the expiration of the extended deadline of the Israel–Lebanon ceasefire agreement that came into effect on 27 November 2024. Lebanese residents returned to their homes, finding them largely destroyed by Israeli forces.

== Aftermath ==
In February of 2025, Israeli forces withdrew from Ayta al-Shaab in following the expiration of the extended deadline of the Israel–Lebanon ceasefire agreement that came into effect on 27 November 2024. The Lebanese Army deployed to the village shortly after. Lebanese residents returned to their homes, finding them largely destroyed by Israeli forces.
