= Ramiyah, Lebanon =

Ramiyah رامية
- Municipality
- Location within Lebanon
- Coordinates: 33°06′39″N 35°18′38″E
- Grid position: 179/279 PAL
- Country: Lebanon
- Governorate: Nabatieh Governorate
- District: Bint Jbeil District
- Elevation: 580 m (1,900 ft)
- Time zone: UTC+2 (EET)
  - Summer (DST): UTC+3 (EEST)

Ramiyah (Arabic: رامية, romanized: Rāmiyah) is a municipality in the Bint Jbeil District in southern Lebanon.

== Etymology ==
According to E. H. Palmer in 1881, Ramia comes from a personal name.

== History ==
In the 1596 tax records, it was named as a village, Ramiya, in the Ottoman nahiya (subdistrict) of Tibnin under the liwa' (district) of Safad, with a population of 49 households and 4 bachelors, all Muslim. The villagers paid a fixed tax-rate of 25% on agricultural products, such as wheat, barley, olive trees, fruit trees, goats and beehives, in addition to "occasional revenues" and a press for olive oil or grape syrup; a total of 3,966 akçe.

In 1852, Edward Robinson noted here: "We came upon an ancient sarcophagus at the foot of the hill, and saw others on the way up. On the top near the village are two very large ones. One of the lids measured 7 1/2 feet long by 2 feet broad, with nearly the same thickness. In a field below our tent, about midway of the hill-side, were others of an unusual character. In a large isolated rock were excavated no less than three sarcophagi, side by side; and then the exterior of the rock was hewn away, and the corners rounded oft. Around each sarcophagus a ledge was left for a corresponding groove in the lid. The whole is a striking monument of antiquity."

In 1875, Victor Guérin found here a great sarcophagus cut in an enormous block, the lower part not yet detached from the rock, containing three receptacles for bodies. The lids were missing. Here are also several rock-cut tombs, one of which, examined by Guérin, was found to contain three loculi.

In 1881, the PEF's Survey of Western Palestine (SWP) described it: "A small stone village, containing about 150 Moslems, situated on a hill-top in the valley, with a few figs, olives, and arable land; the valley to the west turns into a swamp in winter, owing to having no drainage; there are cisterns and a large birket for water supply." They further noted "Several large sarcophagi round this village, and one olive-press."

== Demographics ==
In 2014 Muslims made up 99.56% of registered voters in Ramiyah. 96.22% of the voters were Shiite Muslims.

== See also ==
- Battle of Ayta ash-Shab
- Belat temple

== Bibliography ==
- Conder, C.R.; Kitchener, H.H. (1881). The Survey of Western Palestine: Memoirs of the Topography, Orography, Hydrography, and Archaeology. Vol. 1. London: Committee of the Palestine Exploration Fund.
- Guérin, V. (1880). Description Géographique Historique et Archéologique de la Palestine (in French). Vol. 3: Galilee, pt. 2. Paris: L'Imprimerie Nationale.
- Hütteroth, W.-D.; Abdulfattah, K. (1977). Historical Geography of Palestine, Transjordan and Southern Syria in the Late 16th Century. Erlanger Geographische Arbeiten, Sonderband 5. Erlangen, Germany: Vorstand der Fränkischen Geographischen Gesellschaft. ISBN 3-920405-41-2.
- Palmer, E.H. (1881). The Survey of Western Palestine: Arabic and English Name Lists Collected During the Survey by Lieutenants Conder and Kitchener, R. E. Transliterated and Explained by E.H. Palmer. Committee of the Palestine Exploration Fund.
- Rhode, H. (1979). Administration and Population of the Sancak of Safed in the Sixteenth Century. Columbia University. Archived from the original on 2016-10-10.
- Robinson, E.; Smith, E. (1856). Later Biblical Researches in Palestine and adjacent regions: A Journal of Travels in the year 1852. London: John Murray.
- van de Velde, C.W.M. (1858). Memoir to Accompany the Map of the Holy Land. Gotha: Justus Perthes. (van der Velde, 1858, p. 342)
