= Ibrahim Qubaisi =

Hezbollah commander and head of missile force (1962–2024)

- إبراهيم محمد قبيسي
- Born: October 10, 1962; Zebdin, Nabatieh Governorate, Lebanon
- Died: September 24, 2024 (aged 61); Dahieh, Beirut, Lebanon
- Cause of death: Targeted airstrike
- Military career
- Allegiance: Hezbollah
- Service years: 1982–2024
- Rank: Commander
- Nickname: Abu Musa
- Unit: Badr Unit
- Commands: Head of the Missile and Rocket Force
- Conflicts: 2000–2006 Shebaa Farms conflict; 2000 Hezbollah cross-border raid; 2006 Lebanon war; Hezbollah–Israel conflict (2023–present); 2024 Lebanon war X

Ibrahim Mohammad Qubaisi (10 October 1962 – 24 September 2024), known by the nom de guerre Abu Musa, was a senior Lebanese militant and the head of Hezbollah's Missile and Rocket Force. He was killed in an airstrike by the Israeli Air Force during the 2024 Lebanon war.

== Hezbollah career ==
Qubaisi joined Hezbollah in 1982 and held numerous senior military positions over a career spanning four decades. He served as a senior official in the operations array in Southern Lebanon and commanded the Badr Unit, which is responsible for the group's operations in the sector north of the Litani River.

According to the Israel Defense Forces, Qubaisi was a central planner of the 2000 Har Dov abduction, in which three Israeli soldiers were kidnapped and killed.

As the head of Hezbollah's Missile and Rocket Force, he oversaw units responsible for both statistical and precision-guided missiles. During the hostilities following October 2023, he was responsible for the rocket launches directed at Israel.

== Death ==
On 24 September 2024, during Operation Northern Arrows, the Israeli Air Force conducted a targeted strike in the Ghobeiry neighborhood of Beirut's Dahieh district, killing Qubaisi. The strike targeted a multi-story apartment building where Qubaisi and other senior commanders were located.

The IDF later confirmed that several other officials were killed in the same attack, including Qubaisi's deputy, Abbas Ibrahim Sharaf al-Din, and Hussein Hani, an associate of Fuad Shukr.
