= Axel Schulz (admiral) =

German naval officer

- Allegiance: Germany
- Branch: German Navy
- Service years: 1990–present
- Rank: Flotilla admiral

Axel Schulz is a German naval officer.

Schulz joined the German Navy in 1990.

Since 23 December 2020, Schulz has commanded the German contingent of the United Nations Interim Force in Lebanon (UNIFIL) at Naqoura, Lebanon.
