= Shaath =

Shaath or Sha'ath (Arabic: شعث) is an Arabic surname. Notable people with the surname include:

- Kamalain Shaath, president of the Islamic University of Gaza, Palestine
- Nabil Shaath (born 1938), Palestinian official

== See also ==
- Shath
