= Taraya =

Taraya طاريا
- Village
- Nickname: home of Hamie family
- Location in Lebanon
- Coordinates: 33°59′0″N 36°1′25″E
- Country: Lebanon
- Governorate: Baalbek-Hermel Governorate
- District: Baalbek District

Area
  - Total: 3 km^{2} (1.2 sq mi)
- Elevation: 1,180 m (3,870 ft)
- Time zone: UTC+2 (EET)
  - Summer (DST): +3

Taraya (Arabic: طاريا, romanized: Ṭārayā) is a village in the Baalbek District of the Baalbek-Hermel Governorate in Lebanon. It has an area of 52 km^{2} (20 sq mi) and is at an elevation of 1,180 m (3,870 ft).

== History ==
In 1838, Eli Smith noted Taraya's population as being predominantly Metawileh.

== Bibliography ==
- Robinson, E.; Smith, E. (1841). Biblical Researches in Palestine, Mount Sinai and Arabia Petraea: A Journal of Travels in the year 1838. Vol. 3. Boston: Crocker & Brewster.
