= List of military engagements during the Gaza war =

This is a list of notable engagements during the Gaza war, encompassing land, naval, and air engagements, covering events which took place or began during the October 7 attack and immediately afterwards, including Israel's declaration of war on 8 October, the imposition of the 2023 Israeli blockade of the Gaza Strip, and active operations in the Gaza Strip. It also covers other engagements in and around Israel directly related to its conflict in Gaza, including Israel's operations in occupied West Bank and southern Syria, support for Palestinian militants from Hezbollah in Southern Lebanon, and intensified attacks on commercial vehicles by Houthi movement in the Red Sea.

== Major conflicts by area ==
Name	Location	Start date	End date	Primary opponents	Result
October 7 attacks	Gaza Envelope, Southern District, Israel	October 7, 2023	October 8, 2023	Hamas Allied political factions: Palestinian Islamic Jihad; Popular Resistance Committees; Popular Front for the Liberation of Palestine; Democratic Front for the Liberation of Palestine; Al-Aqsa Martyrs' Brigades; Palestinian Mujahideen Movement; Palestinian Freedom Movement	Hamas tactical victory: Start of the Gaza war
Israel-Hezbollah conflict	Israel, Lebanon and Syria	8 October 2023		Hezbollah Allies: Amal Islamic Group SSNP-L Hamas PIJ Popular Resistance Committees Popular Front for the Liberation of Palestine Islamic Resistance in Iraq (Yemen) Houthi movement Iran Syria (until 2024) Islamic Azz Brigades	Ongoing
Israeli incursions in the West Bank	Israeli-occupied West Bank with spillover into Israel	11 October 2023		Palestinian militias in the West Bank; Palestinian Islamic Jihad; (Fatah) Al-Aqsa Martyrs' Brigades; Hamas; Popular Front for the Liberation of Palestine; Palestinian Mujahideen Movement	Ongoing
Israeli incursions in the West Bank	Israeli-occupied West Bank with spillover into Israel	11 October 2023		(Palestine) Palestinian Authority	Ongoing
Israeli invasion of the Gaza Strip	Gaza Strip with spillover into Israel	27 October 2023 (Note: Initial airstrikes started on 7 October; temporary raids ongoing since 13 October and full scale invasion on 27 October)	19 January 2025	Hamas Allies: Palestinian Islamic Jihad; Popular Front for the Liberation of Palestine; Popular Resistance Committees; PFLP–GC; Democratic Front for the Liberation of Palestine; Smaller Palestinian militant groups (Note: In the Gaza Strip, smaller Palestinian groups fighting in the war include: Palestinian Freedom Movement (Al-Ansar Brigades), Palestinian Mujahideen Movement (Mujahideen Brigades), and various minor al-Aqsa Martyrs' Brigades splinter groups (several of which possibly rejoined the al-Aqsa Martyrs' Brigades just before the war).)	Ongoing: Israel orders multiple evacuations across the Gaza Strip; IDF launches a ground assault in Gaza City, Khan Yunis, and Rafah; Start of the insurgency in the North Gaza Strip; Siege of North Gaza; Pause in fighting due to January 2025 Gaza war ceasefire until it is broken by Israel on 18 March; Israel starts arming gangs in Southern Gaza Strip to weaken Hamas in the areas
Israeli invasion of the Gaza Strip	Gaza Strip with spillover into Israel	18 March 2025		Hamas Allies: Palestinian Islamic Jihad; Popular Front for the Liberation of Palestine; Popular Resistance Committees; PFLP–GC; Democratic Front for the Liberation of Palestine; Smaller Palestinian militant groups	Ongoing: Israel orders multiple evacuations across the Gaza Strip; IDF launches a ground assault in Gaza City, Khan Yunis, and Rafah; Start of the insurgency in the North Gaza Strip; Siege of North Gaza; Pause in fighting due to January 2025 Gaza war ceasefire until it is broken by Israel on 18 March; Israel starts arming gangs in Southern Gaza Strip to weaken Hamas in the areas
Red Sea crisis	Red Sea, Red Sea, Gulf of Aden (esp. Bab-el-Mandeb), Arabian Sea, Mediterranean Sea, (Note: The Houthis have claimed several attacks on ships in the Mediterranean, though none have been confirmed.) Israel, Saudi Arabia, Egypt, and Yemen	19 October 2023		Houthi Yemen (Note: Political legitimacy of all Houthi-led government bodies has been rejected by the United Nations, rival Yemeni factions, the Gulf Cooperation Council, and the United States.): Houthis; Axis of Resistance; Iran (Note: Multiple sources indicate that the Iranian government has deployed military personnel to Houthi-controlled Yemen who are actively involved in attacks on commercial shipping.); Hezbollah; Islamic Resistance in Iraq	Ongoing: Bankruptcy of the Port of Eilat; Disruption of international maritime trade and supply chain; Beginning of Operation Sankalp on 14 December 2023; Beginning of Operation Prosperity Guardian on 18 December 2023; Missile strikes against Houthi-controlled territory started in January 2024; Beginning of Operation Aspides on 19 February 2024; Intensification of US airstrikes in March 2025; Ceasefire between the US and Houthis
Israeli invasion of Syria	Syria	8 December 2024		Syria; Syrian protesters Assad loyalists	Ongoing: Israel advanced within and beyond the UNDOF buffer zone, capturing Madinat al-Salam, Khan Arnabah, Ma'ariya, Al-Wehda Dam, and Quneitra, as well as the Syrian-controlled side of Mount Hermon; Israeli forces also reached parts of the Qatana District.

== October 7 attacks ==
Approximate presence of Hamas militants (blue) on October 7–9, 2023

Clickable map of some of the massacres on 7 October 2023

Early in the morning of 7 October 2023, approximately 3000 militants, from Hamas, Palestinian Islamic Jihad, the PFLP, and DFLP, breached the Gaza fence and attacked multiple locations in Southern Israel. After the IDF repelled most of the attacks, the militants retreated back into Gaza Strip with multiple hostages captured.

Attack	Location	Deaths	Hostages
Nova music festival massacre	Eshkol Regional Council, Israel	364	40
Be'eri massacre	Be'eri, Southern District, Israel	132	32
Nahal Oz attack	Nahal Oz, Southern District, Israel	81	14
Kfar Aza massacre	Kfar Aza, Southern District, Israel	52	17
Zikim attack	Near Zikim, Southern District, Israel	34	0
Nir Oz massacre	Nir Oz, Southern District, Israel	52	76
Netiv HaAsara massacre	Netiv HaAsara, Southern District, Israel	22	0
Alumim massacre	Alumim, Southern District, Israel	22	2-4
Kissufim massacre	Kissufim, Southern District, Israel	48	4
Holit attack	Holit, Southern District, Israel	15	7
Nirim attack	Nirim, Southern District, Israel	9	5
Nir Yitzhak attack	Nir Yitzhak, Southern District, Israel	8	7
Total		1,180	251

=== Battles ===
Engagement	Location	Start date	End date	Result
Nahal Oz attack	(Israel) Nahal Oz	7 October 2023	7 October 2023	Attack repelled
Battle of Re'im	(Israel) Re'im	7 October 2023	7 October 2023	Attack repelled
Battle of Sufa	(Israel) Sufa	7 October 2023	8 October 2023	Attack repelled
Zikim attack	(Israel) Zikim, Bahad 4	7 October 2023	7 October 2023 (Note: With subsequent infiltrations of Hamas militants recorded until October 27.)	Attack repelled
Battle of Ofakim	(Israel) Ofakim	7 October 2023	9 October 2023	Attack repelled
Battle of Sderot	(Israel) Sderot	7 October 2023	8 October 2023	Israeli victory

== Invasion of the Gaza Strip ==
After the attack carried out by Hamas militants, Israeli government declared war to Hamas and began preparing its counter-attack, which began on 27 October. Prior to that, the IDF launched a series of airstrikes throughout the territory and blockaded it, leaving no electricity or supply delivery tracks.

Campaign	Location	Start date	End date
Israeli bombing of the Gaza Strip	Gaza Strip	7 October 2023	Ongoing
Refugee camp airstrikes	Gaza Strip	9 October 2023	Ongoing
Attacks on schools in Gaza	Gaza Strip	17 October 2023	Ongoing
Insurgency in the North Gaza Strip	(Gaza Strip) Gaza City, Jabalia, Beit Lahia	7 January 2024	19 January 2025

=== Battles and offensives ===
Name	Location	Start date	End date
Battle of Beit Hanoun	(Gaza Strip) Beit Hanoun (North)	28 October 2023	31 May 2024
Clashes in Netzarim Corridor	(Gaza Strip) (Israel) Netzarim Corridor	30 October 2023	9 February 2025
Clashes in Netzarim Corridor	(Gaza Strip) (Israel) Netzarim Corridor	18 March 2025	10 October 2025
Siege of Gaza City	(Gaza Strip) Gaza City (North)	2 November 2023	19 January 2025
Al-Shifa Hospital siege	(Gaza Strip) Gaza City (North)	11 November 2023	24 November 2023
Al-Shifa Hospital siege	(Gaza Strip) Gaza City (North)	18 March 2024	1 April 2024
Battle of Jabalia	(Gaza Strip) Jabalia (North)	8 November 2023	31 May 2024
Battle of Shuja'iyya	(Gaza Strip) Shuja'iyya (North)	8 December 2023	26 December 2023
Shuja'iyya incursion	(Gaza Strip) Shuja'iyya (North)	28 June 2024	10 July 2024
2025 Shuja'iyya offensive	(Gaza Strip) Shuja'iyya (North)	4 April 2025	20 August 2025
Siege of Khan Yunis	(Gaza Strip) Khan Yunis (South)	1 December 2023	7 April 2024
July 2024 Khan Yunis incursion	(Gaza Strip) Khan Yunis (South)	22 July 2024	30 July 2024
August 2024 Khan Yunis incursion	(Gaza Strip) Khan Yunis (South)	9 August 2024	30 August 2024
Battle of Khan Yunis (2025)	(Gaza Strip) Khan Yunis (South)	26 May 2025	10 October 2025
Siege of Al-Qarara	(Gaza Strip) Al-Qarara (South)	6 December 2023	7 April 2024
Hamad City incursion	(Gaza Strip) Hamad (South)	4 March 2024	16 March 2024
Rafah offensive	(Gaza Strip) Rafah (South)	13 February 2024	31 January 2025
Rafah offensive	(Gaza Strip) Rafah (South)	20 March 2025	26 May 2025
Siege of North Gaza	(Gaza Strip) Jabalia, Beit Hanoun, Beit Lahia (North)	5 October 2024	19 January 2025
May 2025 Gaza offensive	Gaza Strip	16 May 2025	4 August 2025
2025 Beit Hanoun offensive and siege	Beit Hanoun, Gaza Strip, Palestine	5 July 2025	10 October 2025
Deir al-Balah offensive	Deir al-Balah, Gaza Strip, Palestine	21 July 2025	10 October 2025
2025 Gaza City offensive	Gaza City, Gaza Strip, Palestine	20 August 2025 (Note: Israel announced the formal beginning of the offensive on 20 August, but the IDF was already within parts of the city, having launched an incursion into the Sabra neighborhood on 18 August, and having been operating in the Shuja'iyya neighborhood since 4 April.)	4 October 2025

=== Non-battle attacks ===
Name	Type	Attacker	Date	Location	Casualties
Jabalia camp market airstrike	Airstrike	Israel	9 October 2023	Jabalia refugee camp	203+
Al-Shati refugee camp airstrike	Airstrike	Israel	9 October 2023	Al-Shati refugee camp	15+
Al-Ahli Arab Hospital explosion	Airstrike	Disputed: Israel; PIJ	18 October 2023	Al-Ahli Hospital, Gaza City	471
Church of Saint Porphyrius airstrike	Airstrike	Israel	19 October 2023	Church of Saint Porphyrius	18
Rescue of Ori Megidish	Rescue operation	Israel	30 October 2023	Al-Shati refugee camp	Rescued: 1
Jabalia refugee camp airstrike	Airstrike	Israel	31 October 2023	Jabalia refugee camp	195+
Engineer's Building airstrike	Airstrike	Israel	31 October 2023	Nuseirat	106+
Al-Shifa ambulance airstrike	Airstrike	Israel	3 November 2023	Al-Shifa Hospital	15
Al-Fakhoora school airstrike	Airstrike	Israel	4 November 2023	Jabalia Camp	15
Al-Maghazi camp airstrike	Airstrike	Israel	4 November 2023	Maghazi refugee camp	40
2023 Givat Shaul shooting	Mass shooting	Hamas	30 November 2023	Jerusalem	6
Shuja'iyya ambush	Land combat	Hamas	13 December 2023	Shuja'iyya	10
Shuja'iyya friendly fire incident	Land combat	Israel	15 December 2023	Shuja'iyya	3
2024 Ra'anana attack	Vehicle ramming	Hamas	15 January 2024	Ra'anana	1
Rafah hostage raid	Rescue operation	Israel	12 February 2024	Rafah	Deaths:100+ Rescued: 2
Flour massacre	Airstrike	Israel	29 February 2024	Nablusi junction, Gaza City	118+
World Central Kitchen aid convoy attack	Airstrike	Israel	1 April 2024	Deir al-Balah	7
Zana ambush	Land combat	Hamas	6 April 2024	Al-Zana, Khan Yunis	4+
Tel al-Sultan massacre	Airstrike	Israel	26 May 2024	Tel al-Sultan camp	45–50
Al-Mawasi refugee camp attack	Airstrike	Israel	28 May 2024	Al-Mawasi, Rafah	21
Al-Sardi school attack	Airstrike	Israel	6 June 2024	Al-Sardi school, Nuseirat refugee camp	33
Nuseirat operation	Rescue operation	Israel	8 June 2024	Nuseirat refugee camp	Deaths: 276; Rescued: 4
Tel al-Sultan ambush	Land combat	Hamas	15 June 2024	Tel al-Sultan, Rafah	8
Attacks over North Gaza	Airstrike	Israel	9 July 2024	Deir al-Balah, Gaza City	50+
Al-Awda School massacre	Airstrike	Israel	9 July 2024	Abasan al-Kabira, Khan Yunis	31+
Al-Mawasi airstrikes	Airstrike	Israel	13 July 2024	Al-Mawasi, Khan Yunis	141+
Al-Shati attack	Airstrike	Israel	13 July 2024	Al-Shati refugee camp, Gaza City	22+
Houthi drone strike on Israel	Airstrike	Houthi movement	19 July 2024	Tel Aviv	1
Bani Suheila attack	Airstrike	Israel	22 July 2024	Bani Suheila, eastern Khan Yunis	73+
Khadija school airstrike	Airstrike	Israel	26 July 2024	Deir al-Balah	30+
Hamama school bombing	Airstrike	Israel	4 August 2024	Sheikh Radwan	17+
Al-Tabaeen school attack	Airstrike	Israel	10 August 2024	Eastern Gaza City	90+
August 2024 Deir al-Balah attacks	Airstrike	Israel	17 August 2024	Az-Zawayda, eastern Deir al-Balah	34+
Rescue of Qaid Farhan Al-Qadi	Rescue operation	Israel	27 August 2024	Rahat	Rescued: 1
Al-Mawasi refugee camp attack	Airstrike	Israel	10 September 2024	Al-Mawasi, Khan Yunis	40+
Al-Jawni school attack	Airstrike	Israel	11 September 2024	Nuseirat refugee camp	18
2024 Jaffa shooting	Mass shooting	Hamas	1 October 2024	Jaffa	7
2024 Tulkarm Camp airstrike	Airstrike	Israel	3 October 2024	Tulkarm	20+
Deir al-Balah mosque bombing	Airstrike	Israel	6 October 2024	Deir al-Balah	26+
Al-Aqsa Hospital attack	Airstrike	Israel	14 October 2024	Deir al-Balah	5+
2024 Neot HaKikar shooting	Land combat	Muslim; Brotherhood	18 October 2024	Neot HaKikar	2
First Beit Lahia airstrike	Airstrike	Israel	19 October 2024	Beit Lahia	92+
Second Beit Lahia airstrike	Airstrike	Israel	29 October 2024	Beit Lahia	93+
Attack on al-Mawasi	Airstrike	Israel	4 December 2024	Al-Mawasi, Khan Yunis	30+
December 2024 Nuseirat attack	Airstrike	Israel	12 December 2024	Nuseirat refugee camp	36
March 2025 surprise attacks	Airstrike	Israel	18 March 2025	Gaza Strip	591+
Rafah paramedic massacre	Mass shooting	Israel	23 March 2025	Rafah	15
April 2025 Shuja'iyya massacre	Airstrike	Israel	9 April 2025	Shuja'iyya, Gaza City	35-55
2025 Houthi attack on Tel Aviv airport	Airstrike	Houthi movement	4 May 2025	Ben Gurion Airport, Tel Aviv	None

== Incursions into West Bank ==
Alongside its invasion into Gaza Strip, Israel has carried out multiple attacks on the territory of Palestinian West Bank, which is partially occupied by the IDF. The goal stated by Israel was to eliminate Hamas militants which fled there from Gaza Strip. The Palestinian Authority, which has not proclaimed itself a supporter of the IDF, is also conducting operations against Hamas militias.

=== West Bank campaigns ===
Name	Location	Start date	End date	Initiator
Israeli incursions in Tulkarm	(West Bank) Tulkarm	10 March 2023 (Note: Early operations in Tulkarm were conducted by Israel before the October 7 attacks; however, they have significantly intensified afterwards.)	Ongoing	Israel
West Bank unrest	West Bank	26 July 2024	31 July 2024	(Palestine) Palestinian Authority
2024 Israeli military operation in the West Bank	West Bank	28 August 2024	October 2024	Israel
Raids in Tubas	(West Bank) Tubas Governorate	8 October 2024	November 2024	(Palestine) Palestinian Authority
Operation Protect the Homeland	(West Bank) Jenin	5 December 2024	21 January 2025	(Palestine) Palestinian Authority
2025 Israeli operation in Jenin	(West Bank) Jenin	21 January 2025	Ongoing	Israel

=== Attacks ===
Name	Location	Date	Attacker	Casualties
Lehi Street bombing	(Israel) Tel-Aviv	18 August 2024	Hamas	1
Allenby Bridge shooting	(Jordan) (West Bank) Allenby Bridge	8 September 2024	Islamic Resistance in Jordan	4
2024 Jaffa shooting	(Israel) Jaffa, Tel Aviv	1 October 2024	Hamas	9
2024 Tulkarm Camp airstrike	(West Bank) Tulkarm	3 October 2024	Israel	20+
2025 al-Funduq shooting	(West Bank) Al-Funduq	7 January 2025	(Palestinian Islamic Jihad) Hamas and PIJ	3
Bat Yam bus bombings	(Israel) Bat Yam	20 February 2025	Hamas	0

== Military conflict in Lebanon ==
Lebanese militant group Hezbollah started launching rockets into Northern Israel and Golan Heights on October 8, 2023, to support Palestinian forces against Israel. In response, Israel bombed Southern Lebanon, the region of highest Hezbollah presence, as well as engaged in clashes with militants close to the Israeli-Lebanese border.

Campaign	Location	Start date	End date
2024 Israeli invasion of Lebanon	Southern Lebanon	1 October 2024	27 November 2024

=== Long distance attacks ===
Name	Date	Location	Attacker	Sources
Majdal Shams attack	2 July 2024	Majdal Shams, Golan Heights, Israel	Hezbollah	
Central Beirut medical center airstrike	4 October 2024	Beirut, Lebanon	Israel	
Derdghaya Melkite Church airstrike	9 October 2024	Derdghaya, Lebanon	Israel	
Bachoura airstrike	10 October 2024	Bachoura, Lebanon	Israel	
Binyamina strike	13 October 2024	Binyamina, Israel	Hezbollah	
Aitou airstrike	14 October 2024	Aitou, Lebanon	Israel	
Attack on Nabatieh municipal council	16 October 2024	Nabatieh, Lebanon	Israel	
Drone attack on Benjamin Netanyahu's residence	19 October 2024	Caeserea, Israel	Hezbollah	
Sahel Alma airstrike	19 October 2024	Sahel Alma, Lebanon	Israel	
Batroun operation	2 November 2024	Batroun, Lebanon	Israel	

== Notable assassinations ==
Target	Affiliation	Date	Location	Other deaths	Notes and Other Notable Casualties
Abbas Raad	(Hezbollah) Redwan Force	22 November 2023	(Lebanon) Beit Yahoun	4	Raad was the son of Hezbollah MP Mohammad Raad.
Razi Mousavi	Islamic Revolutionary Guard Corps	25 December 2023	(Syria) Sayyidah Zaynab	3	Iranian general serving in the IRGC's Quds Force.
Saleh al-Arouri	Hamas	2 January 2024	(Lebanon) Dahieh, Beirut	6	Al-Arouri was the deputy chairman of Hamas' political bureau, mostly operating in Lebanon. Also killed Hamas commander Azzam Al-Aqra.
Sami Fendi	Hamas	2 January 2024	(Lebanon) Dahieh, Beirut	6	Al-Arouri was the deputy chairman of Hamas' political bureau, mostly operating in Lebanon. Also killed Hamas commander Azzam Al-Aqra.
Mushtaq Talib Al-Saeedi	Harakat Hezbollah al-Nujaba	4 January 2024	Baghdad, Iraq	1+	Former senior commander of the 12th brigade of the Popular Mobilization Forces.
Wissam al-Tawil	(Hezbollah) Redwan Force	8 January 2024	(Lebanon) Majdel Selm	1	Senior commander of Hezbollah's Redwan Force.
Ali Hussein Barji	Hezbollah	9 January 2024	(Lebanon) Khirbet Selm	1	Death denied by Hezbollah.
Sadegh Omidzadeh	Islamic Revolutionary Guard Corps	20 January 2024	(Syria) Mezzeh, Damascus	10	Also killed four other Iranian officials, Ali Aghazadeh, Saeed Karimi, Hossein Mohammadi and Mohammad Amin Samadi.
Fadi Suleiman	Hezbollah	21 January 2024	(Lebanon) Kafra	3	Survived; other Hezbollah affiliates killed.
Abu Baker al-Saadi	Kata'ib Hezbollah	7 February 2024	Baghdad, Iraq	3	Commanders of Kata'ib Hezbollah. Perpetrated by the United States in response to the Tower 22 drone attack.
Arkan Al-Alawi	Kata'ib Hezbollah	7 February 2024	Baghdad, Iraq	3	Commanders of Kata'ib Hezbollah. Perpetrated by the United States in response to the Tower 22 drone attack.
Abbas al-Dabs	Hezbollah	8 February 2024	(Lebanon) Nabatieh	2	Hezbollah operative that worked with IRGC.
Basil Salah	Hamas	10 February 2024	(Lebanon) Jadra	3	Survived; civilians and Hezbollah affiliates killed.
Hadi Ali Mustafa	Hamas	13 March 2024	(Lebanon) Tyre	2	A member of Hamas' construction bureau.
Mohammad Reza Zahedi	Islamic Revolutionary Guard Corps	1 April 2024	(Syria) Damascus	6	Iranian senior military officer in the Islamic Revolutionary Guard Corps claimed by Israel to be a primary communicator with Hezbollah.
Taleb Abdallah	Hezbollah	12 June 2024	(Lebanon) Jwaya	4	Commander of the Nasr unit of Hezbollah.
Mohammed Deif	Hamas	13 July 2024	(Gaza Strip) Al-Mawasi, Rafah	Deif was leading the Al-Qassam Brigades, Hamas' military wing that executed the October 7 attacks, while Salama was in charge of its Khan Yunis branch. Both of them were killed during heavy artillery strikes on Al-Mawasi. Their deaths were announced by the IDF shortly after the attack and denied by Hamas until January 2025.	
Rafa Salama	Hamas	13 July 2024	(Gaza Strip) Al-Mawasi, Rafah	Deif was leading the Al-Qassam Brigades, Hamas' military wing that executed the October 7 attacks, while Salama was in charge of its Khan Yunis branch. Both of them were killed during heavy artillery strikes on Al-Mawasi. Their deaths were announced by the IDF shortly after the attack and denied by Hamas until January 2025.	
Fuad Shukr	Hezbollah	30 July 2024	(Lebanon) Haret Hreik, Beirut	3	Senior Hezbollah member who was accused by Israel of being involved in the Majdal Shams attack.
Ismail Haniyeh	Hamas	31 July 2024	Tehran, Iran	2	Haynieh was the political leader of Hamas and one of the perpetrators of the October 7 attack. The airstrike also killed his bodyguard.
Ibrahim Aqil	(Hezbollah) Redwan Force	20 September 2024	(Lebanon) Haret Hreik, Beirut	55	Commander-in-chief of the Redwan Force, Hezbollah's special operations unit.
Hassan Nasrallah	Hezbollah	27 September 2024	(Lebanon) Haret Hreik, Beirut	33+	Nasrallah was the Secretary-General of Hezbollah since 1992. Karaki was a Jihad Council member and Niforoushan was a commander of the Lebanese IRGC branch.
Ali Karaki	Hezbollah	27 September 2024	(Lebanon) Haret Hreik, Beirut	33+	Nasrallah was the Secretary-General of Hezbollah since 1992. Karaki was a Jihad Council member and Niforoushan was a commander of the Lebanese IRGC branch.
Abbas Nilforoushan	Islamic Revolutionary Guard Corps	27 September 2024	(Lebanon) Haret Hreik, Beirut	33+	Nasrallah was the Secretary-General of Hezbollah since 1992. Karaki was a Jihad Council member and Niforoushan was a commander of the Lebanese IRGC branch.
Hashem Safieddine	Hezbollah	3 October 2024	(Lebanon) Dahieh, Beirut	26	Safieddine was expected to become Hassan Nasrallah's successor as Secretary-General of Hezbollah.
Yahya Sinwar	Hamas	16 October 2024	(Gaza Strip) Tel al-Sultan, Khan Yunis	2	Hamas leader and one of the main perpetrators of the October 7 attack. Killed in action while not being Israel's initial target.
Issam al-Da'alis	Hamas	18 March 2025	Unknown location, Gaza Strip	Watfa, al-Da'alis and Sultan were high-ranked Hamas officials governing the Gaza Strip, while Hamza was the spokesperson for the PIJ. They were killed different locations during the first wave of Israel's surprise attacks on Gaza, along with other Hamas figures. Da'alis was previously claimed by Israel to have been assassinated on 23 July 2024, but Hamas denied the claim.	
Mahmoud Abu Watfa	Hamas	18 March 2025	(Gaza Strip) Gaza City	Watfa, al-Da'alis and Sultan were high-ranked Hamas officials governing the Gaza Strip, while Hamza was the spokesperson for the PIJ. They were killed different locations during the first wave of Israel's surprise attacks on Gaza, along with other Hamas figures. Da'alis was previously claimed by Israel to have been assassinated on 23 July 2024, but Hamas denied the claim.	
Bahjat Abu Sultan	Hamas	18 March 2025	Unknown location, Gaza Strip	Watfa, al-Da'alis and Sultan were high-ranked Hamas officials governing the Gaza Strip, while Hamza was the spokesperson for the PIJ. They were killed different locations during the first wave of Israel's surprise attacks on Gaza, along with other Hamas figures. Da'alis was previously claimed by Israel to have been assassinated on 23 July 2024, but Hamas denied the claim.	
Abu Hamza	Palestinian Islamic Jihad	18 March 2025	(Gaza Strip) Nuseirat refugee camp	Watfa, al-Da'alis and Sultan were high-ranked Hamas officials governing the Gaza Strip, while Hamza was the spokesperson for the PIJ. They were killed different locations during the first wave of Israel's surprise attacks on Gaza, along with other Hamas figures. Da'alis was previously claimed by Israel to have been assassinated on 23 July 2024, but Hamas denied the claim.	
Salah al-Bardawil	Hamas	23 March 2025	(Gaza Strip) Khan Yunis	22	Hamas' political bureau senior member and spokesperson.

== Other attacks ==
=== Iran-Israel exchanges ===
Name	Date	Attacker	Weapons	Target
Operation True Promise I	13–14 April 2024	Iran	Medium-range missiles	Israel
Israeli retaliation strikes	19 April 2024	Israel	Drones	Iran
Operation True Promise II	1 October 2024	Iran	Medium-range missiles	Israel
Operation Days of Repentance	26 October 2024	Israel	Heavy munitions	Iran; Iraq; Syria

== See also ==
- Israeli–Palestinian conflict
- Gaza–Israel conflict
- Outline of the Gaza war
- Casualties of the Gaza war
- Israeli–Lebanese conflict
- List of massacres in Israel
- List of massacres in Palestine
- Israeli war crimes
