= Hamad City incursion =

2024 military engagement in the Gaza Strip

- Part of the siege of Khan Yunis during the Israeli invasion of the Gaza Strip, and part of the Gaza war
Date	3 – 16 March 2024 (1 week and 6 days)
Location	Hamad City, Khan Yunis, Gaza Strip 31.37608°N 34.31835°E
Result	Israeli withdrawal from Hamad after reportedly clearing it

Belligerents
Israel	(Palestine) Palestinian Joint Operations Room; Hamas; Palestinian Islamic Jihad; Palestinian Mujahideen Movement

Commanders and leaders
(Israel) Dan Goldfuss (Israel) Liran Batito (Israel) Elad Tzuri (Israel) Omer Cohen (Israel) Amishar Ben David †	Unknown

Units involved
Israel Defense Forces; Israeli Ground Forces; 89th Commando Brigade; Givati Brigade; Egoz Unit; Maglan; Israeli Navy; Shayetet 13; Israeli Air Force	(Palestine) Palestinian Joint Operations Room; (Hamas) Al-Qassam Brigades; (Palestinian Islamic Jihad) Al-Quds Brigades; Mujahideen Brigades

Casualties and losses
Israeli claim: (Israel) 3 killed (Israel) 20 injured	Israeli claim: 70–100 killed 300+ arrested 100 buildings damaged or destroyed
- 8,500 displaced

The Hamad City incursion was a two-week Israel Defense Forces (IDF) operation in March 2024 against Hamas forces in the apartment complex and neighborhood of Hamad City, Khan Yunis, in the Gaza Strip.

== Battle ==
On 3 March, Israeli forces entered Hamad City, setting up checkpoints there and telling civilians to leave.

On 8 March, Major Amishar Ben David, battalion commander's command and control officer was killed while fighting in Hamad City.

On 11 March, the Israeli army said it killed 15 Hamas fighters in residential apartments, and also said it found weapons caches in tunnels.

On 13 March, heavy clashes were reported in Hamad City with Israeli forces conquering the town building by building. Two Israeli soldiers reportedly were killed. Israel said it conducted more than 100 airstrikes.

On 15 March, Israeli forces claimed to have destroyed a 200-metre long tunnel in Hamad City.

On 16 March 2024, Palestinian forces claimed to have targeted an Israeli personnel carrier using "Asif" bomb and AR bullets.

On 16 March, Israeli forces withdrew.

On 19 March, Israel announced the end of its incursion, including the destruction of 100 buildings, while killing reportedly over 100 fighters and seizing weapons.

== Aftermath ==
On 21 March, Palestinian journalist showed a video of empty streets in Hamad City without the Israeli presence. Fifteen bodies were recovered in the area by the Palestine Red Crescent Society (PRCS).

== See also ==
- List of military engagements during the Gaza war
- Siege of Khan Yunis
- Outline of the Gaza war
- Timeline of the Israeli–Palestinian conflict in 2024
- Timeline of the Gaza war (12 January 2024 – 6 May 2024)
