= August 2024 Khan Yunis incursion =

2024 military engagement in the Gaza Strip

Third battle of Khan Yunis
- Part of the Israeli invasion of the Gaza Strip during the Gaza war
| Date | 9 August 2024 – 30 August 2024 (3 weeks) |
| Location | Khan Yunis, Gaza Strip |
| Result | Israeli withdrawal |

Belligerents
| Israel | (Palestine) Palestinian Joint Operations Room; Hamas; Palestinian Islamic Jihad; (Fatah) Al Aqsa Martyrs' Brigades; Palestinian Mujahideen Movement |

Commanders and leaders
| (Israel) Dan Goldfuss | (Hamas) Mohammed Sinwar |

Units involved
| Israel Defense Forces; Israeli Ground Forces; 98th Paratroopers Division; 35th Paratroopers Brigade; Israeli Air Force | (Palestine) Palestinian Joint Operations Room; (Hamas) Al-Qassam Brigades; (Hamas) Khan Yunis Brigade; Camp (West Khan Yunis) Battalion; North Khan Yunis Battalion; South Khan Yunis Battalion; Eastern (Khan Yunis) Battalion; (Palestinian Islamic Jihad) Al-Quds Brigades; Al-Aqsa Martyrs' Brigades; Mujahideen Brigades |

Casualties and losses
| (Israel) 2 soldiers killed | Per Israel: 250+ militants killed |
- (Palestine) 21+ Palestinian civilians killed

Israeli forces launched an incursion into Khan Yunis on 9 August 2024 as part of their invasion of the Gaza Strip during the Gaza war. The battle represented the third separate ground operation in Khan Yunis by Israel against Hamas-led Palestinian forces, following the first siege and a brief incursion in the city.

== Background ==
Starting on 1 December 2023, the Israel Defense Forces had launched air raid operations on the city of Khan Yunis, with Israeli Air Force fighter jets striking over 50 targets in the area. These air raids and artillery strikes continued in large numbers. On 7 April, all Israeli forces withdrew from Khan Yunis. In an announcement the same day, Israeli Defense Minister Yoav Gallant claimed that Hamas forces has ceased to exist as a military force in Khan Yunis and stated the withdrawal was in preparation for the planned Rafah offensive. However, rockets were fired by Palestinian forces in Khan Yunis immediately after the IDF's withdrawal. White House National Security Communications Adviser John Kirby claimed it was a "rest and refit" rather than a preparation for an offensive.

A brief eight-day battle occurred in Khan Yunis governorate from 22 July 2024 to 30 July 2024, which included an Israeli attack on Bani Suheila, which resulted in the deaths of 73 Palestinians and more than 270 injured. The battle ended with an Israeli withdrawal, allowing Palestinians to re-enter the city and return to their homes.

Following the Israel-conducted assassination of Ismail Haniyeh, the political leader of Hamas, Yahya Sinwar formally replaced Haniyeh as the political head of Hamas on 6 August. Hours prior to the beginning of the battle, Prime Minister of Israel Benjamin Netanyahu announced that Israeli negotiators would be sent to deliberate on a "final" cease-fire proposal urged by President of the United States Joe Biden in conjunction with Egypt and Qatar.

=== Prior to the operation ===
Israeli and American intelligence and military officials both stated their belief that Yahya Sinwar was hiding in Khan Yunis, and reported that their intelligence showed them that Hamas and Hamas infrastructure was collecting in the region. Based on this information, the IDF began plans to begin new operations in the Khan Yunis governorate to target Hamas “command-and-control centers”.

On the eve of the battle on 8 August, residents reported that Israeli forces began distributing leaflets from airplanes telling them to evacuate from Khan Yunis in addition to towns in the eastern region of the Khan Yunis governorate, including Al-Qarara, Al-Salqa, and Bani Suheila. Several thousands of civilians evacuated from Khan Yunis while carrying essential equipment such as tents, blankets, and mattresses. Most evacuees had to walk out of the city on foot due to the low petrol supplies in the region prohibiting most from using vehicles. Agence France-Presse journalists reported that by the dusk of 8 August, the city was fully evacuated of civilians as far as they could see.

== Battle ==
The third battle of Khan Yunis began on 9 August 2024 with a series of airstrikes from the Israeli Air Force that according to the city's Nasser Hospital, killed at least twenty-one Palestinians. One airstrike struck the residence of the Abu Moamar family and killed a Palestinian television reporter and journalist, while also killing his wife and their three daughters.

Another airstrike hit several tents in the al-Mawasi coastal refugee camp that housed internally displaced people, which killed an Al Aqsa television journalist in addition to another five people. A third strike hit a car in the city.

The 98th Paratroopers Division entered Khan Yunis and began military ground operations targeting Hamas combatants. The Israeli Defense Forces reported that they had conducted airstrikes on thirty targets in Khan Yunis related to Hamas operations, including Hamas troops and weapon storages. The IDF further reported that its ground troops had entered the city to combat Hamas troops while located Hamas tunnels and other associated infrastructure.

On 12 August, an IDF soldier of the 101st Airborne Battalion was killed in a Hamas sniper attack in Khan Yunis.

On 19 August, the IDF announced that an officer was killed and three other soldiers were wounded in a case of friendly fire when their position was hit by an airstrike. Israeli F-15 fighter jets launched two missiles at targets in the Khan Yunis area. One missile hit its target, while the other missile did not correctly glide to the intended target due to a technical issue and instead struck a building where a unit of Israeli paratroopers was positioned.

On 30 August, Israel announced its withdrawal from Khan Yunis, stating they had "completed their divisional operation" in the area, killing more than 250 militants and destroying many militant sites.

== Aftermath ==
Hamas stated on 3 October that it conducted a three-stage attack targeting Israeli armored vehicles east of Khan Yunis near the Israel-Gaza Strip border.

On 7 October, the one year anniversary of the start of the war, Hamas launched rockets at Tel Aviv from Khan Yunis, demonstrating that the IDF had not eradicated Hamas in the city. Following this, the IDF ordered an evacuation of the Khan Yunis area.

The IDF conducted a brief hours-long incursion into Khan Yunis on the evening of 24 October, withdrawing the next day.

Following the implementation of the January 2025 Israel–Hamas war ceasefire, Hamas militants reemerged in Khan Yunis and were seen parading through the streets of the city.

== See also ==
- Siege of Khan Yunis
- Second battle of Khan Yunis
- Rafah offensive
