= July 2024 Khan Yunis incursion =

Event of the Gaza war

- Part of the Israeli invasion of the Gaza Strip during the Gaza war
Date	22 July 2024 – 30 July 2024 (1 week and 1 day)
Location	Khan Yunis, Gaza Strip, Palestine
Result	Israeli withdrawal

Belligerents
Israel	(Palestine) Palestinian Joint Operations Room; Hamas; Palestinian Islamic Jihad; (Fatah) Al-Aqsa Martyrs' Brigades

Commanders and leaders
(Israel) Dan Goldfuss (Israel) Elad Tzuri (Israel) Omer Cohen	(Hamas) Mohammed Sinwar

Units involved
Israel Defense Forces; Israeli Ground Forces; 7th Armored Brigade; Oz Brigade; 35th Paratroopers Brigade; Israeli Air Force	Palestinian Joint Operations Room; (Hamas) Al Qassam Brigades; (Hamas) Khan Yunis Brigade; (Palestinian Islamic Jihad) Al-Quds Brigades; Al-Aqsa Martyrs' Brigades

Casualties and losses
(Israel) None killed Per Hamas: (Israel) 1 Namer destroyed	Per Israel: (Palestine) 150+ militants killed
- Per Palestinian sources: (Palestine) 300 Palestinians killed (Palestine) 416+ Palestinians injured (Palestine) 200 Palestinians missing Per UN: (Palestine) 190,000+ Palestinians displaced

Israeli forces launched an incursion into Khan Yunis on 22 July 2024 as part of the ongoing Gaza war. It marked the return of the Israel Defense Forces (IDF) to the Khan Yunis area inside the Gaza Strip after a previous battle and siege which lasted from December 2023 to April 2024.

== Background ==
=== First battle ===
The first battle between Israel and Hamas in Khan Yunis, part of the Israeli invasion of the Gaza Strip, began on 1 December 2023 and evolved into a siege in late January 2024. It ended on 7 April 2024 with the withdrawal of the Israel Defense Forces (IDF) from not only Khan Yunis but all of the southern Gaza Strip, a move which was partially reversed with the ongoing Rafah offensive beginning in May 2024.

The IDF had failed to dismantle Hamas in Khan Yunis, with the latter firing rockets at Israel hours after the withdrawal, and retaining "combat effectiveness" in the city.

=== Evacuation order ===
The IDF issued an evacuation order to Palestinian civilians, a move which was seen as controversial by some for supposedly allowing Hamas commanders to escape with the civilians. The Palestinian Civil Defense (PCD) said that the evacuation order would affect around 400,000 people. Israel downsized the humanitarian zone where 1.7 million Palestinians took refuge and adjusted its boundaries, reducing it from 65 sq km to 48 sq km.

== Battle ==
IDF troops under the command of Brigadier General Dan Goldfuss began a ground offensive into Khan Yunis on 22 July. The IDF claimed to have struck around 30 Hamas infrastructure targets with a mix of ground strikes and air strikes. Israeli tanks advanced into and attacked multiple small towns on the eastern fringe of Khan Yunis with air support. This included an Israeli attack on Bani Suheila, a town in the Khan Yunis area, which resulted in the deaths of 73 Palestinians and more than 270 injured.

Hamas targeted IDF tanks advancing in Bani Suheila with rocket-propelled grenades and explosively formed penetrators.

On 24 July, the IDF had confirmed that it had recovered the bodies of 5 Israelis, 2 civilians and 3 soldiers. They were killed during the October 7 attacks, and their bodies were taken to the Gaza Strip by Hamas.

On 25 July, it was reported that Hamas, Palestinian Islamic Jihad (PIJ), and al-Aqsa Martyrs' Brigades were clashing with the IDF within and around Khan Yunis. According to the IDF, Hamas attempted to fire several rockets into Israeli territory from Khan Yunis, but these failed and fell near an UNRWA-run school, injuring several people and killing two.

On 30 July, the IDF withdrew from Khan Yunis, and Palestinians began returning to their homes in the area.

== Aftermath ==
Days later on 9 August, the IDF invaded Khan Yunis for the third time, and withdrew once more from the area on 30 August.

== See also ==
- Outline of the Gaza war
- List of military engagements during the Gaza war
- Timeline of the Gaza war (13 July 2024 – 26 September 2024)
- Timeline of the Israeli–Palestinian conflict in 2024
