= Timeline of the Israeli–Palestinian conflict in 2024 =

- Timeline of the Israeli–Palestinian conflict
- 2023; 2024; 2025

The following is a list of events during the Israeli–Palestinian conflict in 2024, including the events of the Gaza war.

== January ==
=== 1 January ===
- The Gaza Health Ministry announced that at least 156 Palestinians were killed in Israeli attacks in the past 24 hours, bringing the death toll to 21,978.
- 15 Palestinians were killed in the evening by an Israeli airstrike on a residential building in Deir el-Balah.
- Iran deployed the warship Alborz to the Bab al-Mandeb Strait in response to the killing of 10 Houthi fighters by US forces the previous day.
- Turkey's Ministry of Health posted on X that it received 292 injured and sick from Gaza for treatment.
- The IDF announced that it would partially withdraw troops in Gaza and shift toward more targeted operations against Hamas.

=== 2 January ===
- An airstrike in the Dahieh neighborhood of Beirut, Lebanon, resulted in the assassination of Saleh al-Arouri, deputy leader of Hamas' political bureau and one of the architects of a Hamas attack on Israel. Along with al-Arouri, six other individuals including high-ranking Hamas militants were killed. This event occurred a day before Hezbollah's commemoration of the 4th anniversary of Qassem Soleimani's assassination and followed the killing of another QF General, Sayyed Razi Mousavi, in Syria seven days earlier.

Israeli military raids in the West Bank resulted in the deaths of five Palestinians. Four were killed in Azzun, and the fifth was shot in Qalqilya during a raid, allegedly after opening fire. An IDF soldier was moderately injured. The IDF claimed the four men in Azzun had barricaded themselves in a house and opened fire. The Palestine Ministry of Health confirmed the deaths, stating that Israeli forces took away the bodies. Operations in the West Bank intensified after the Hamas-led attack on Israel on 7 October 2023. According to the IDF, as of 2 January, more than 2,550 wanted persons had been arrested in the West Bank, including approximately 1,300 associated with Hamas. 321 Palestinians had been killed in the West Bank by Israeli troops or settlers since October 7, according to the Palestinian health ministry.

- The Palestinian Red Crescent Society headquarters was bombed, killing five including a baby.

=== 3 January ===
- Israel announced that a soldier of the elite Yahalom unit was killed in Gaza, bringing the IDF death toll there to 175.
- The Gaza Health Ministry announced at least 128 Palestinians were killed by Israeli attacks in the past 24 hours, bringing the death toll to 22,313.
- A UN official condemned an Israeli attack on Khan Yunis which killed five people, including a newborn baby, who were sheltering at the Al Amal Hospital.
- The Palestine Red Crescent Society reported that Israeli attacks near the al-Amal Hospital were intensifying.

=== 4 January ===
- At least 14 people were killed by an Israeli airstrike west of Khan Yunis.
- The Gaza Health Ministry announced that 125 Palestinians were killed in Israeli attacks in the past 24 hours, bringing the death toll to 22,438.
- The Palestine Red Crescent Society stated Israel bombed the home of the Central Gaza Ambulance Center director. It also reported another attack on the al-Amal hospital that killed one person.

=== 5 January ===
- 315 Palestinians have been killed in the West Bank, including East Jerusalem, since 7 October 2023. Since OCHA started recording casualties in 2005, the 507 Palestinians killed in the West Bank in 2023 is the highest number of Palestinians killed as is the 36 Israelis killed in the West Bank and Israel in 2023 in attacks by Palestinians from the West Bank.
- The Gaza Health Ministry reported that at least 162 Palestinians had been killed in Israeli attacks in the past 24 hours, bringing the death toll to 22,600.
- Maersk again announced that it would avoid sending vessels through the Red Sea and Gulf of Aden "for the foreseeable future" due to Houthi attacks on its ships.
- The al-Qassem Brigades ambushed an IDF infantry squad in Bani Suheila, Khan Yunis and claimed to have killed and injured multiple soldiers.
- At least five Palestinians were killed in the evening by an Israeli airstrike in the Nuseirat camp.
- Israeli shelling was reported near the al-Nasr Hospital.
- The International Federation of Red Cross and Red Crescent Societies condemned Israel's attacks on El Amal Hospital and the Palestinian Red Crescent headquarters.
- Doctors Without Borders set up a field hospital in Rafah, stating, "Staff are literally kneeling in blood on the floor to try to save the life of a person, even intubating on the floor."

=== 6 January ===
- 22 people were killed in an Israeli airstrike on a house in Khan Yunis during the early hours of the morning.
- Israel announced that an officer of the Nahal Brigade was killed in northern Gaza, bringing the IDF death toll in Gaza to 176.
- A displaced man was shot in the chest by an Israeli sniper in front of El Amal Hospital.

=== 7 January ===
- On 17 January, the BBC reported their investigation into the killing on 7 January by Israeli airstrikes of 7 Palestinian men near Jenin. They reported that relatives, witnesses and a paramedic provided "strong evidence" that the men were not militants and no contemporaneous clashes with Israeli forces. The IDF had linked the strike to an earlier operation in the Jenin refugee camp, during which a female soldier was killed and pointed to their statement at the time which said ""during the operation, an aircraft struck a terrorist squad that hurled explosives at the forces operating in the area".
- At least seven Palestinians were killed in a drone strike while an Israeli police officer was killed by a roadside bomb during an Israeli raid in Jenin.
- The Gaza civil defence announced that at least 8,000 people were missing in Gaza, assumed to be buried underneath the rubble of destroyed buildings.
- The Gaza Health Ministry reported that at least 113 Palestinians were killed in Israeli attacks in the past 24 hours, bringing the death toll to 22,835.
- The Islamic Resistance In Iraq claimed responsibility for an attack on an Israeli base in the Golan Heights and a cruise missile attack on a 'vital target' on Haifa Bay.
- Gaza Media Office stated 6,000 wounded people were waiting to be approved to receive treatment in Egypt.
- The Gaza Health Ministry stated Israeli drones were shooting at "anything that moves", and were aiming to disable the hospital.

=== 8 January ===
- The Gaza health ministry reported that at least 249 Palestinians were killed in Israeli attacks in the past 24 hours, bringing the death toll to 23,084.
- Three Palestinians were shot dead by Israeli forces during a raid in Tulkarm.
- Drones reportedly opened fire at people near Al-Aqsa Hospital.

=== 9 January ===
- Israel announced that nine of its soldiers were killed fighting in Gaza, bringing the IDF death toll there to 187.
- The Gaza Health Ministry reported that 126 Palestinians were killed in Israeli attacks in the past 24 hours, bringing the death toll to 23,210.
- Just before midnight, at least 15 Palestinians were killed and dozens more were injured by an Israeli airstrike on an apartment building in Rafah.

=== 10 January ===
- Videos have emerged showing Israeli forces shooting a 17-year-old boy and repeatedly driving over the body of a man they had shot, adding to accusations over the use of deadly force without provocation.
- The Gaza Health Ministry reported that 147 Palestinians were killed in Israeli attacks in the past 24 hours, bringing the death toll to 23,357.
- At least 40 were killed in an Israel bombing near the entrance of Al-Aqsa hospital.
- The Palestinian Red Crescent reported an Israeli airstrike killed four paramedics and two patients in an ambulance.
- The Gaza Health Ministry stated it was investigating injuries caused by internationally banned weapons and warned 800,000 people in northern Gaza had been "sentenced to death" due to the collapse of the healthcare system.

=== 11 January ===
- South Africa presented a case to the International Court of Justice, accusing Israel of "genocide" in Gaza.
- U.S. and British warplanes, ships and submarines launch dozens of airstrikes across Yemen. The United States carries out another strike in Yemen the following day. The Houthis say five of their fighters were killed in the initial strikes, and that they will retaliate and continue their attacks on shipping.
- The International Court of Justice hears opening statements in a case in which South Africa accuses Israel of committing a state-led genocide campaign against the Palestinian population. Israel denies the accusation.
- Nine Palestinians were killed and others were wounded in an evening Israeli airstrike on a house in the Shawka neighbourhood in Rafah.
- 112 Palestinians were killed by Israeli attacks in the past 24 hours, bringing the death toll to 23,469.

=== 12 January ===
- The Gaza Health Ministry reported that 151 Palestinians were killed by Israeli attacks in the past 24 hours, bringing the death toll to 23,708.
- 11 Palestinians were killed in an Israeli airstrike targeting a house hosting displaced people south of Deir el-Balah.
- An Israeli airstrike killed at least eight Palestinians in the Al-Manara neighbourhood in Khan Yunis.
- The UN stated Israel was blocking medical supplies to northern Gaza.
- Newborn babies at Al-Aqsa were at risk due to the blackout.

=== 14 January ===
- Netanyahu made a speech marking 100 days of the war on Gaza, saying that "No one will stop us. Not The Hague." referring to the genocide trial it faces in the ICJ.
- Israeli troops opened fire on Palestinian civilians attempting to access the limited amount of humanitarian aid in Gaza.
- Tedros Adhanom Ghebreyesus called for the protection of Gaza's remaining hospitals.

=== 15 January ===
- At least 33 Palestinians were killed by morning Israeli airstrikes on houses in Khan Yunis. A further 22 others were killed in airstrikes in the central Gaza Strip that same morning.
- Two Palestinian men from Hebron conducted a car-ramming attacks in Ra'anana ran over Israelis, killed one woman and wounded 17 civilians including children.
- The Gaza Health Ministry reported that at least 132 Palestinians were killed in Israeli attacks in the past 24 hours, bringing the Gaza death toll to 24,100.
- Armed Israeli settlers attacked the Palestinian village of Burin, south of Nablus, after midnight.
- Israeli forces bulldozed two Palestinian houses during a midnight raid in Qalqilya.
- The Houthis fired an anti-ship cruise missile towards a US destroyer in the Red Sea, which was shot down by a US fighter jet.
- At least 25 Palestinians were killed in evening Israeli airstrikes in the Gaza Strip.
- A video released by the Qassam Brigades appeared to show two Israeli hostages killed by Israeli airstrikes.
- The Houthis announced that they would expand their attacks to include US and UK naval and commercial vessels.

=== 16 January ===
- Iran claimed to have launched missile strikes against a Mossad base in Erbil, in Iraq's Kurdistan Region, killing four people and injuring six.
- The Gaza Health Ministry reported that at least 158 Palestinians were killed in Israeli attacks in the past 24 hours. Some bodies were also recovered from rubble in the northern Gaza Strip, bringing the death toll to 24,285.
- The UN's OCHA reported that 378,000 people in Gaza were facing 'phase 5' or catastrophic levels of hunger and that 939,000 others were facing 'phase 4' or emergency levels of hunger.
- Shelling from a nearby attack damaged the al-Amal hospital.
- The World Health Organization reported a rise in Hepatitis A cases in Gaza.
- The Health Ministry reported 350,000 chronically ill patients were deprived of medication.
- UNOCHA reported, "Lack of fuel for water, sanitation and hygiene increases risks of health and environmental hazards," while "Lack of medicine debilitated the functionality of the six partially functioning hospitals".

=== 17 January ===
- At least 23 Palestinians were killed in early morning airstrikes in Rafah and Khan Younis.
- Four Palestinians were killed in an Israeli drone strike in Tulkarm. Another Israeli drone strike killed three Palestinians in Nablus.
- An Israeli bulldozer was targeted by Palestinians with an explosive device in Tulkarm after Israeli bulldozers destroyed streets and infrastructure in the city.
- An Israeli drone strike on a car in the Balata refugee camp killed one Palestinian. The Palestine Red Crescent Society said Israeli forces fired at ambulances trying to reach the burning vehicle.
- The Jordanian army said its military field hospital in Khan Yunis was badly damaged by Israeli shelling nearby.
- The Gaza Health Ministry reported that 168 Palestinians were killed in Israeli attacks in the past 24 hours, bringing the death toll to 24,448.
- Israel reported that two soldiers of the 14th Armoured Brigade and a third from the Givati brigade was killed during the fighting in Gaza, bringing the IDF death toll there to 193.
- The mother of a recovered deceased captive accused the IDF of killing her son by filling the tunnel he was held in with poison gas.
- Israeli forces blew up and destroyed the Israa University in Gaza City.
- The Jordanian field hospital in Khan Younis was severely damaged by Israeli shelling.
- The Palestine Red Crescent Society said Israeli forces fired at ambulances trying to reach the burning vehicle.

=== 18 January ===
- In the early hours of the morning, 16 Palestinians were killed by Israeli shelling in Rafah.
- The Gaza Health Ministry reported that 172 Palestinians were killed in Israeli attacks in the past 24 hours, bringing the death toll to 24,620.
- Israeli forces arrested 46 people from one family in Teqoa village near Bethlehem.
- Six Palestinians were killed in an Israeli raid in Tulkarm.
- The Aqsa Martyrs’ Brigades clashed with Israeli forces in Zawata, west of Nablus, and Qalqilya, injuring an Israeli Border Police officer.
- The Islamic Resistance in Iraq claimed responsibility for a drone attack targeting US forces in Himu, Syria.
- Families of Hamas captives in Gaza staged a protest and blocked the Ayalon Highway in Tel Aviv.
- The Palestinian foreign ministry accused Israel of committing 15 "massacres" killing 172 people in 24 hours under the cover of a communications blackout in the Gaza strip.
- Israeli Prime Minister Benjamin Netanyahu told the White House that he rejects any moves to "establish a Palestinian state".
- The Palestinian foreign ministry accused Israel of committing 15 "massacres" killing 172 people in 24 hours under the cover of a communications blackout in the Gaza strip.

=== 19 January ===
- Tawfic Abdel Jabbar, a 17-year-old Palestinian-American was fatally shot in the head while driving on Highway 60 in the West Bank by an off-duty Israeli police officer, an Israel Defense Forces soldier, and an Israeli settler. United States Department of State spokesman Vedant Patel called for an investigation into the killing.
- Israel announced a soldier of the Givati brigade was killed the day prior while fighting in southern Gaza, bringing the IDF death toll to 194.
- An Israeli air strike hit a residential building west of Khan Younis, killing five people.
- An Israeli air strike on an apartment block near the al-Shifa Hospital killed 12 people and injured more.
- The Al-Nasser Salah al-Deen Brigades released a video of an Israeli captive who it claimed was killed by an Israeli airstrike in the Gaza Strip.
- Jordan stated Israel had again targeted its field hospital, shooting inside at sheltering staff.
- The Gaza Health Ministry reported that 142 Palestinians were killed in Israeli attacks in the past 24 hours, bringing the death toll to 24,762.
- An Israeli siege of Tulkarm stretched for more than 40 hours, claiming that they are attempting to root out resistance in the city.
- The Red Crescent stated Israeli gunfire wounded displaced people at al-Amal hospital.

=== 20 January ===
- A 20-year-old Palestinian man was shot and injured by Israeli forces during a raid on the Rafidia area, west of Nablus.
- Clashes broke out between Israeli forces and Palestinians resisting a raid in Balata refugee camp, and an IDF bulldozer destroyed civilian infrastructure.
- The IDF shelled the al-Katiba area and the al-Amal neighbourhood in Khan Yunis.
- Thousands of Yemenis demonstrated in Sana'a to support Palestine and protest against Western attacks on Yemen.
- The Islamic Resistance in Iraq claimed responsibility for a missile attack targeting US forces in Al-Asad Airbase.* The Gaza Health Ministry stated, "The aid entering the Gaza Strip does not meet basic health needs. We try to differentiate between cases among the wounded and sick to save who we can."
- Airstrikes in Khan Younis were reportedly concentrated in the areas around Nasser Medical Complex and the Jordanian field hospital.

=== 21 January ===
- The Gaza Health Ministry reported that 178 Palestinians were killed in Israeli attacks in the past 24 hours, bringing the death toll to 25,105.
- Israel announced that a soldier of the Kiryati Brigade was killed in the fighting in Gaza, bringing the IDF death toll there to 195.
- A protest was held in Tel Aviv demanding the release of Hamas captives and elections to replace Netanyahu's government.
- Israel shelled the eastern part of the Jabalia refugee camp, killing four Palestinians and injuring 21 more, according to the Palestine Red Crescent Society.

=== 22 January ===
- The Gaza Health Ministry reported that 190 Palestinians were killed by Israeli attacks in the past 24 hours, bringing the death toll to 25,295.
- Israel announced that three soldiers of the Paratroopers Brigade were killed fighting in the Gaza Strip, while at least 21 soldiers were killed after an explosion caused the building they were in to collapse, bringing the total IDF death toll in Gaza to 219.
- The Red Crescent reported at least 50 deaths from Israeli attacks in western Khan Yunis.
- Egypt warned Israel that any attempt to seize control of the Philadelphi Corridor would cause a "serious threat" to diplomatic relations between the two countries.
- The Abu Ali Mustafa Brigades with the al Aqsa Martyrs' Brigades claimed that it conducted an attack south of Jenin.
- Protesters stormed the Knesset to demand the Israeli government do more to secure the release of captives held in the Gaza Strip.
- The Houthis claimed to have fired missiles at the US-flagged heavy load carrier Ocean Jazz but did not state whether they hit the vessel. And the US and the UK conducted combined strikes on eight Houthi military targets that was supported by Australia, Bahrain, Canada, and the Netherlands.
- According to UNOCHA, Israeli troops raided the al-Khair Hospital in the west of Khan Younis, arrested staff and ordered civilians at the hospital to move further south.
- The Palestinian Red Crescent reported that Nasser Hospital was under attack. It also reported the IDF was attacking its ambulance center in Khan Younis and had lost contact with staff there, preventing paramedics from reaching wounded people.

=== 23 January ===
- The Gaza Health Ministry reported that 195 Palestinians were killed in Israeli attacks in the past 24 hours, bringing the death toll to 25,490.
- The IDF fired artillery shells at al-Amal hospital and the headquarters of the Palestine Red Crescent Society in Khan Yunis, killing one person.
- Israeli settlers stormed the Al-Aqsa Mosque in Jerusalem under the protection of Israeli police and set fire to a car showroom near the village of Beitin, east of Ramallah.
- Hamas urged the UN, Red Cross and World Health Organization to step in "immediately" and "shoulder their responsibilities" to stop Israel's attacks on Gaza's hospitals.
- Hamas claimed that its fighters seized three drones south of Zeitoun and detonated a mine field targeting Israeli vehicles in Juhor ad Dik.

=== 24 January ===
- The Gaza Health Ministry reported that at least 210 Palestinians were killed and 354 injured in Israeli attacks in the past 24 hours, bringing the death toll to 25,700.
- At least 13 people were killed and 56 injured after Israel struck a UNRWA training centre.
- People fleeing Nasser Hospital were reportedly killed by Israeli tanks and drones.
- Three civilians were killed in an airstrike on the Palestine Red Crescent Society headquarters.
- The Red Crescent reported the IDF had imposed a curfew on Al-Amal Hospital.

=== 25 January ===
- The Gaza Health Ministry reported that at least 200 Palestinians were killed by Israeli attacks in the past 24 hours, bringing the death toll to 25,900.
- The UN said that 12 people were killed by tank fire on a UN shelter housing thousands of displaced civilians in Khan Yunis. Israel denied responsibility and said it was investigating the incident.
- Hundreds of protesters called on the Netanyahu government to secure the immediate release of captives held in the Gaza Strip, blocking Tel Aviv's Ayalon Highway before rallying outside the nearby IDF headquarters.
- Four children were killed when Israeli warplanes bombed a residential area in the Nuseirat refugee camp.
- 20 Palestinians were killed and 150 seriously injured, after Israeli troops opened fire on a crowd gathering to receive humanitarian aid at a roundabout in Gaza City.
- The PIJ and the PFLP conducted a combined attack targeting an Israeli supply line in the Central Governorate of the Gaza Strip.
- Hezbollah launched two one-way attack drones at Iron Dome batteries in Kfar Blum.
- The United States and United Kingdom sanctioned four Houthi officials, namely "defense Minister" Mohamed al-Atifi, "maritime forces commander" Muhammad Fadl Abd-al-Nabi, "coastal defense forces chief" and "naval college director" Muhammad Ali al-Qadiri and "procurement director" Mohammad Ahmad al-Talibi.
- Israeli forces assaulted Palestinian police officers at the Manger Square in Bethlehem.
- The Gaza Health Ministry reported bombing near the Nasser Hospital.
- UNOCHA reported three hospitals and the Red Crescent ambulance center were besieged.

=== 26 January ===
- UNRWA is investigating allegations of 12 of its employees' involvement in Hamas's October 7 attacks on Israel, following reports of extensive links between UNRWA staff in Gaza and militant groups. Intelligence findings suggest about 1,200 UNRWA employees in Gaza have connections with Hamas and Islamic Jihad, with 190 doubling as militants.
- Several employees, including school teachers, are implicated in logistics, weapons procurement, and direct participation in attacks.
- UNRWA dismissed implicated employees and launched an investigation. The controversy led several countries to halt funding for UNRWA, pending further developments.
- The Gaza Health Ministry reported that 183 Palestinians were killed by Israeli attacks in the past 24 hours, bringing the death toll to 26,083.
- Israel announced that a soldier of the Combat Engineering Corps was killed fighting in Gaza, bringing the death toll there to 220.
- The PIJ fired rockets targeting five locations in southern Israel, including Ashkelon, Nir Am, and Sderot while the Mujahideen Brigades fired rockets at what it claimed was an IDF headquarters for the Gaza Division's "Northern Brigade" and at Nahal Oz.
- A Gaza Health Ministry spokesman stated Israel was deliberately paralyzing Al-Amal and Nasser Hospitals.
- An Israeli overnight air raid on a house in the al-Hassayna neighbourhood of the Nuseirat refugee camp killed at least 11 people.
- The Palestinian Red Crescent reported a third day of bombing around its headquarters.
- The gate of Al-Amal Hospital was reportedly hit by Israeli tank fire.
- The International Court of Justice issued a ruling on South Africa's genocide case against Israel over the Gaza conflict, ordering the latter to do all it can to prevent death, destruction and acts of genocide. However, it did not order Israel to stop military operations there.

=== 27 January ===
- The Gaza Health Ministry reported that 174 Palestinians were killed in Israeli attacks in the past 24 hours, bringing the death toll to 26,257.
- The CEO of the International Federation of Red Cross mentioned that, "Heavy fighting continue to escalate in the surroundings of Palestine Red Crescent Al-Amal Hospital in Khan Yunis, resulting in several injuries and hindering PRCS teams from reaching those in need."
- Snipers outside al-Amal Hospital were reportedly preventing anyone from leaving the hospital.
- A director at Nasser Hospital stated 95 percent of staff had evacuated.
- The Gaza Health Ministry stated that Israeli drone fire had destroyed Nasser's water tanks.
- The Red Crescent condemned Israel's attacks on al-Amal hospital.

=== 28 January ===
- The Gaza Health Ministry reported that at least 165 Palestinians were killed in Israeli attacks in the past 24 hours, bringing the death toll to 26,422.
- A protest was held in Tel Aviv calling for Netanyahu's resignation and early elections, some protestors were arrested by police.
- The Qassam Brigades said that fighters successfully targeted two Merkava tanks with two Yassin 105 RPGs in the Jourat al-Aqqad area west of Khan Younis, and two other
- Merkava tanks were hit by RPGs in the al-Amal neighbourhood.
- A drone attack on Tower 22, a small US Army outpost in Jordan, killed three American service personnel and wounded at least 34 others. Biden said the attack was carried out by Iran-backed militias from Iraq and Syria.
- The Islamic Resistance in Iraq claimed to have fired unspecified munitions at an Israeli naval facility in the Zvulun Valley.

=== 29 January ===
- Killing of Hind Rajab: six-year-old Palestinian girl from Gaza City was killed by the Israeli military, after being the sole survivor of Israeli tank fire on the vehicle in which she had fled with six relatives.
- The Gaza Health Ministry reported that at least 215 Palestinians were killed in Israeli attacks in the past 24 hours, bringing the death toll to 26,637.
- In the Al-Rashid humanitarian aid incident, also known as Flour Massacre, at least 118 Palestinian civilians died and at least 760 were injured when Israel Defense Forces opened fire at an aid site. Some died from gunshot wounds, some from mass panic.
- At least ten rockets were fired toward central Israel.
- Israeli cabinet ministers attended the "Return to Gaza" conference in order to plan illegal settlements in the Strip.
- The Al-Qassem brigades fired one rocket salvo targeting Tel Aviv.
- Pro-Iran fighters in Lebanon conducted 15 attacks into northern Israel.
- Unspecified militants conducted a rocket attack targeting US forces at al Shaddadi, Al-Hasakah Governorate, Syria.
- The Islamic Resistance in Iraq claimed a drone attack targeting an unspecified "military target" in Israel.
- Five Palestinians were arrested by the IDF during a raid on Jenin.

=== 30 January ===
- Israeli forces conducted a raid dressed in civilian clothes on Ibn Sina Specialized Hospital in Jenin, West Bank, killing three Palestinian militants, including a Hamas commander. The Israeli military stated that the individuals were involved in militant activities, and that the commander had planned a terror attack using the hospital as a hiding place. Palestinian authorities accused Israel of a "massacre inside hospitals". Hamas said that Israeli forces "executed three fighters," while Palestinian Islamic Jihad said two of the militants killed were its members.
- The Gaza Health Ministry reported that 114 Palestinians were killed in Israeli attacks in the past 24 hours, bringing the death toll to 26,751, including at least 11,000 children.
- Kata'ib Hezbollah said it would suspend all military operations against the US, and instead stated that they would "continue to defend our people in Gaza in other ways."
- The Al-Farouq Mosque in Khan Yunis refugee camp was bombed by Israeli forces.
- Israeli warplanes targeted a house in the Sabra neighbourhood of Gaza City, killing at least 20 civilians and injuring several others.

=== 31 January ===
- The Gaza Ministry of Health reported that both the Nasser Medical Complex and Al Amal Hospital had run out of food.
- The Al Amal hospital was reportedly completely out of service.
- Israel announced that three soldiers were killed in Gaza the day prior, bringing the IDF death toll there to 223.
- The Gaza Health Ministry reported that 150 Palestinians were killed in Israeli attacks in the past 24 hours, bringing the death toll to 26,900.
- Palestinian officials accused Israel of further summary killings after a mass grave was discovered, containing the bodies of 30 people that had been shot dead whilst blindfolded and with their hands bound.
- The Palestinian Mujahideen Movement conducted two rocket attacks from the Gaza Strip targeting Reim military base and Beer Sheva.
- Armed Israeli settlers injured two Palestinian children near the village of Susya, south of Hebron.

== February ==
=== 1 February ===
- The Gaza Health Ministry reported that 119 Palestinians were killed in Israeli attacks in the past 24 hours, bringing the death toll to 27,019.
- Dozen bodies of alleged "torture victims" were found in a school in Beit Lahia.
- The Al Quds Brigades fired mortars targeting Israeli forces in Kissufim and the Mujahideen Brigades fired rockets at an Israeli military base and "airstrip" in Reim.
- The Islamic Resistance in Iraq claimed a drone attack targeting the port of Haifa.
- The Tubas Battalion of Hamas and the Tubas Battalion of the al Aqsa Martyrs’ Brigades conducted multiple attacks on Israeli forces during an Israeli raid in the city.
- The Palestine Red Crescent Society said Israeli forces stormed al-Amal hospital for the third time.

=== 2 February ===
- The Gaza Health Ministry reported that 112 Palestinians were killed in Israeli attacks in the past 24 hours, bringing the death toll to 27,131.
- Israeli settlers tried to set a car on fire on the outskirts of as-Sawiya, south of Nablus.

=== 3 February ===
- The Gaza Health Ministry reported that 107 Palestinians were killed in Israeli attacks in the past 24 hours, bringing the death toll to 27,238.
- The US announced new sanctions and charges targeting the IRGC.
- Two Palestinian men in their 20s were hospitalized after being beaten by Israeli forces during a raid in Jenin.
- There were nine attacks from southern Lebanon into northern Israel.
- The Islamic Resistance in Iraq conducted four drone and rocket attacks targeting US forces in Harir Air Base and Ain al Assad Airbase in Iraq and in al Tanf garrison and Rumaylan Landing Zone in Syria.

=== 4 February ===
- The Palestinian Red Crescent stated food and fuel at al-Amal hospital were depleted and that "medical supplies and medicines are at zero stock, with a significant shortage of essential drugs for chronic diseases".
- Two children were killed in an Israeli airstrike on a kindergarten in Rafah.
- Israel announced that a reservist of the Harel Brigade was killed fighting in southern Gaza, bringing the IDF death toll there to 225.
- The Gaza Health Ministry reported that 127 Palestinians were killed in Israeli attacks in the past 24 hours, bringing the death toll to 27,365.
- At least eight attacks were conducted from southern Lebanon into northern Israel.

=== 5 February ===
- Six attacks were conducted from southern Lebanon into northern Israel
- A convoy of trucks waiting to bring food into the Gaza Strip was hit by Israeli fire, damaging several goods.

=== 6 February ===
- The Gaza Health Ministry reported that 107 Palestinians were killed in Israeli attacks in the past 24 hours, bringing the death toll to 27,585.

=== 7 February ===
- The Gaza Health Ministry stated that 11,000 people were in urgent need of a medical evacuation.
- The IDF stormed Tulkarem, imposing a siege on the Nur Shams camp, killing two Palestinian men.
- An Israeli convoy of military vehicles and bulldozers stormed Jenin.
- Israel rejected a Hamas three-stage proposal for a ceasefire.

==== 8 February ====
- The Gaza Health Ministry reported that 130 Palestinians were killed in Israeli attacks in the past 24 hours, bringing the death toll to 27,833.
- Israeli air strikes on two homes killed at least 12 Palestinians and injured many more in the Tel al-Sultan and Saudi neighborhoods of Rafah.
- Two Palestinians were killed and 10 were injured in an Israeli air raid on a home in Deir el-Balah.
- Armed Israeli settlers attacked Palestinian shepherds and prevented their access to pastures south of Hebron.

=== 9 February ===
- Israeli forces raided Al-Amal hospital.
- The Gaza Health Ministry reported that 107 Palestinians were killed in Israeli attacks in the past 24 hours, bringing the death toll to 27,947.
- Israeli snipers killed at least 21 Palestinians near the Nasser Hospital.
- Unspecified Palestinian fighters conducted three attacks targeting Israeli forces in Beit Furik, Tulkarm, and Kafr Qaddum.
- Nine cross-border attacks was conducted from southern Lebanon into northern Israel. The commander of the IDF Northern Command said that the IDF is preparing for an "expansion of the war" in Lebanon during a meeting with northern Israeli town councils.
- UNRWA director Philippe Lazzarini said that Israel had blocked food for 1.1 million Palestinians in Gaza.

=== 10 February ===
- 12 Palestine Red Crescent workers have now been killed in the line of duty. This includes three Palestine Red Crescent ambulance drivers killed on 10 February 2024.
- The Gaza Health Ministry reported that 117 Palestinians were killed in Israeli attacks in the past 24 hours, bringing the death toll to 28,064.
- The IDF killed at least 28 Palestinians in strikes on Rafah.
- A Hamas senior official survived an Israeli assassination attempt in Lebanon which killed two civilians.
- Two people were killed in an Israeli attack on a police car in Rafah.
- The Islamic Resistance in Iraq claimed an attack on an unspecified target near the Dead Sea.
- West Bank residents held an anti-Israeli demonstration in Nablus.
- The al-Aqsa Martyrs' Brigades clashed with Israeli forces in Faraa, Tubas.

=== 11 February ===
- A Palestinian was shot and killed by an IDF soldier in Jerusalem's Old City after he tried to stab an officer. In a second incident near Israeli settlement of Beitar Illit in the West Bank, an IDF soldier shot a Palestinian who attempted to stab him.
- The Palestine Red Crescent Society stated three patients had died at Al-Amal hospital due to Israeli forces preventing oxygen supplies from reaching the hospital.
- After the raid on Al-Amal hospital, the IDF took 20 terror operatives hiding in the hospital into custody.
- The Palestinian Mujahideen Movement fired a rocket salvo from the Gaza Strip targeting a town in Southern Israel adjacent to Beit Lahia.

=== 12 February ===
- Israel announced that two soldiers of the Maglan unit were killed fighting in Gaza, bringing the IDF death toll there to 229.
- The Al-Qassam Brigades stated three hostages had been killed and eight wounded during Israeli airstrikes.
- Senior Kata'ib Hezbollah official and Popular Mobilization Forces Chief of Staff, Abu Fadak al Mohammadawi said that the “greatest revenge” for the US strike in 7 February will be the expulsion of "foreign forces" from Iraq.
- The Palestinian Mujahideen Movement fired rockets from the Gaza Strip targeting southern Israel.
- Israeli settlers from Rehelim entered as-Sawiya and attacked shepherds by pelting rocks. Another group of settlers from Yitzhar entered the village of Madama, attacking residences and smashing windows.
- Israeli forces in Asira al-Qibliya, south of Nablus, shot and seriously injured a young man and a 16-year-old boy.

=== 13 February ===
- At least five people were killed in the Nuseirat camp, while four more were killed by an Israeli bomb in the Brazil neighbourhood of Rafah.
- Israel announced that three soldiers of the Gaza Division were killed fighting in Gaza the day prior, bringing the IDF death toll there to 232, and two other soldiers were injured.
- The Gaza Health Ministry reported that 133 Palestinians were killed in Israeli attacks in the past 24 hours, bringing the death toll to 28,473.
- France imposed travel bans on 28 Israeli settlers who it said were guilty of violence against Palestinian citizens in the West Bank.
- Israeli snipers killed three people at Nasser Hospital.
- Hezbollah fired anti-tank guided missiles targeting Kiryat Shmona, injuring two Israeli civilians. It also fired rockets targeting the al-Marj site.

=== 14 February ===
- The Gaza Health Ministry reported that 103 Palestinians were killed in Israeli attacks in the past 24 hours, bringing the death toll to 28,576.
- The al-Aqsa Martyrs' Brigades and PIJ both claimed small arms fire targeting Mairav, a town near the West Bank.
- The Houthis launched an anti-ship ballistic missile into the Gulf of Aden.

=== 15 February ===
- The Gaza Health Ministry reported that at least 87 Palestinians were killed in Israeli attacks in the past 24 hours, bringing the death toll to 28,663.
- Israel announced that a soldier of the Paratroopers Brigade was killed fighting in Gaza, bringing the IDF death toll there to 233.
- At least 11 people were killed in an intense bombardment on the Nuseirat refugee camp.
- Israel arrested at least 20 Palestinians in the West Bank.

=== 16 February ===
- Two Israelis were killed and four others were wounded in a shooting at Re'em Junction. The shooter, a 37-year-old man from Shuafat in East Jerusalem holding Israeli residency, was identified. According to eyewitnesses, he exited a vehicle before opening fire towards the individuals standing at a bus stop.
- Israel announced that another soldier of the Paratroopers Brigade was killed fighting in southern Gaza the day prior and several others injured, bringing the IDF death toll there to 234.
- At least five people died in the Nasser Hospital after electricity was severed and oxygen supplies were cut.
- Hamas filed a complaint to the UN Security Council over the series of Israeli attacks on civilian targets on 14 February.
- A gunman killed two people and wounded four others during a mass shooting at a bus stop on near Kiryat Malakhi before being killed by a bystander.
- The Gaza Health Ministry reported that 112 Palestinians were killed in Israeli attacks in the past 24 hours, bringing the death toll to 28,775.
- Unidentified Palestinian fighters threw improvised explosive devices at Israeli forces around Aqaba and separately clashed with Israeli forces in Aboud.
- The al-Aqsa Martyrs' Brigades fired rockets and Palestinian Islamic Jihad targeted an IDF site and Ashkelon from the northern Gaza Strip.

=== 17 February ===
- The International Court of Justice rejected South Africa's request for new constraints aimed at preventing an Israeli incursion in Rafah, saying instead that the "perilous situation" in Rafah and all of Gaza required Israel to observe its January ruling, which demanded Israel take "all measures within its power" to prevent the crime of genocide by its forces.
- The Gaza Health Ministry reported that at least 83 Palestinians were killed in Israeli attacks in the past 24 hours, bringing the death toll to 28,858.
- Eight Palestinians were killed in Israeli air strikes on homes in the al-Zawaida and Dier el-Balah refugee camps, with dozens more injured.
- The United States ambassador to the United Nations stated that the United States is expected to use its veto power to block a United Nations vote on a ceasefire set for 20 February. The ambassador expressed concerns that the resolution put forward by Algeria could potentially harm ongoing negotiations to facilitate a temporary halt in the conflict. The veto was criticized by many countries.

=== 18 February ===
- The Gaza Health Ministry reported that 127 Palestinians were killed in Israeli attacks in the past 24 hours, bringing the death toll to 28,985.
- WHO chief Tedros Adhanom Ghebreyesus said Nasser hospital was no longer functional due to the IDF's "week-long siege followed by the ongoing raid".
- Netanyahu said remarks by Brazilian President Lula da Silva comparing Israel's conduct to the Holocaust and Hitler crossed a red line.
- Hamas chief Ismail Haniyeh blamed Israel for a lack of progress in achieving a ceasefire deal in Gaza.
- Al-Amal hospital was shelled by the Israeli military.
- At least 10 Palestinians were killed overnight after Israeli forces launched attacks on Deir el-Balah and farmlands on the edges of Rafah.
- Intensive shelling was reported in Beit Hanoon while Israeli raids hit Al-Sekka Street and the Zeitoun neighbourhood in Gaza City.
- Palestinians in Jabalia gathered outside UNRWA headquarters in a protest calling for food to be delivered to the refugee camp.
- Israeli settlers entered the Palestinian village of Turmus Ayya, setting vehicles on fire.

=== 19 February ===
- The Gaza Health Ministry reported that 107 Palestinians were killed in Israeli attacks in the past 24 hours, bringing the death toll to 29,092.
- The Palestinian foreign minister accused Israel of "colonialism and apartheid" at the start of a week of International Court of Justice hearings, called by the UN general assembly to assess the legality of Israel's 57-year occupation of Palestinian lands.
- The European Union announced the start of Operation Aspide, a naval mission to protect shipping in the Red Sea and surrounding waters from Houthi attacks.
- The Houthis destroyed a US MQ-9 drone over Hodeida.
- WHO representative Rik Peeperkorn stated, "The degradation of health services needs to stop. A number of countries in the region and even in Europe have reached out and are willing to accept patients. We estimate that at least 8,000 patients need to be referred out of Gaza."

=== 20 February ===
- At least two people were killed in a suspected Israeli airstrike on a residential building in the Kafr Sousa neighborhood of Damascus.
- Israel announced that a soldier of the Paratroopers Brigade died of wounds sustained fighting in Gaza, bringing the IDF death toll there to 236.
- The Gaza Health Ministry reported that 103 Palestinians were killed in Israeli attacks in the past 24 hours, bringing the death toll to 29,195.

=== 21 February ===
- Israel announced that a soldier of the Nahal Brigade was killed the day prior fighting in Gaza, bringing the IDF death toll there to 237.
- The Gaza Health Ministry reported that 118 Palestinians were killed in Israeli attacks in the past 24 hours, bringing the death toll to 29,313.
- At least two people were killed in a suspected Israeli airstrike on a residential building in the Kafr Sousa neighborhood of Damascus.

=== 22 February ===
- One Israeli was killed and at least eight others were injured when three Palestinian gunmen opened fire on motorists near Ma'ale Adumim. Two of the gunmen were killed and another was arrested. In response to the attack, Israel approved a plan to build around 3,000 homes in settlements in the Israeli-occupied West Bank.
- At least three people were killed and more injured by Israeli airstrikes on Rafah.
- The Houthis announced a ban on vessels linked to Israel, the United States and United Kingdom from sailing in seas surrounding Yemen.
- Local authorities reported that Israeli shelling on residential homes in central Gaza killed at least 40 people.
- At least 97 Palestinians were killed in Israeli attacks in the past 24 hours, bringing the death toll to 29,410.
- Chris Lockyear, the director of Doctors Without Borders, spoke to the United Nations Security Council, stating, "There is no health system to speak of left in Gaza. Israel's military has dismantled hospital after hospital. What remains is so little in the face of such carnage".
- Doctors at al-Shifa reported conditions were getting "worse and worse, day by day".

=== 23 February ===
- According to Aljazeera, 104 Palestinians were killed in Israeli attacks in the past 24 hours, bringing the death toll to 29,514.
- Netanyahu revealed his plans for post-war Gaza, saying that Israel would be able to operate militarily in the area indefinitely to prevent the resurgence of Hamas and adding that the UNRWA must be closed.
- Israeli Finance Minister Bezalel Smotrich said that the country’s defence ministry would allow the construction of 3,344 new homes in illegal Israeli settlements.
- A person was killed and 15 others were injured when an Israeli bomb targeted a car in Jenin.
- The UNRWA said it could no longer provide services in north Gaza.
- Israeli forces demolished two homes, a water well and the electricity network in Khallet al-Farra, south of Hebron.
- At least 24 people were killed in an Israeli strike on a home hosting displaced people in Deir el-Balah.
- An Israeli airstrike hit a vehicle in the Jenin refugee camp, killing at least one person.
- Hezbollah said it attacked several Israeli bases and targeted two buildings where troops had gathered in Metula and Manara.
- The Gaza Health Ministry stated 350,000 chronic patients, 60,000 pregnant women, and 700,000 children in Gaza were facing severe health complications due to malnutrition, dehydration, and the collapse of the healthcare system.

=== 24 February ===
- According to the Gaza Health Ministry, at least 92 Palestinians were killed in Israeli attacks during the past 24 hours, bringing the death toll to 29,606.
- Israel said that a Major of the Givati Brigade was killed whilst fighting in the northern Gaza strip, which brought the IDF death toll there to 238.
- The IAF killed at least seven people, including a child in Rafah.

=== 25 February ===
- The Gaza Health Ministry reported that at least 86 Palestinians were killed in Israeli attacks in the past 24 hours, bringing the death toll to 29,692.
- A serviceman of the United States Air Force, Aaron Bushnell, set himself on fire in front of the Israeli Embassy in Washington DC to protest against Israel's war in Gaza. He later died because of his injuries.

=== 26 February ===
- Mohammad Shtayyeh (as the Palestinian Prime Minister) announced his resignation, also citing problems brought about by the war, that is including the "genocide" in Gaza.
- At least 90 Palestinians were killed in Israeli attacks in the past 24 hours, which brought the death toll to 29,782, the Gaza Health Ministry said.

=== 27 February ===
- The Gaza Health Ministry reported that at least 96 Palestinians were killed in Israeli attacks in the past 24 hours, bringing the death toll to 29,878.
- The Jordanian Air Force dropped food aid on the Gaza Strip.
- Protests were held in Tel Aviv against the war and in support of a ceasefire in Gaza.

=== 28 February ===
- Four Palestinian children died of starvation in the Kamal Adwan hospital in northern Gaza.
- Israel announced that two soldiers of the Givati Brigade were killed and seven others were injured whilst fighting in Gaza the day prior, bringing the IDF death toll there to 242.
- According to the Gaza Health Ministry, at least 76 Palestinians were killed in several Israeli attacks since yesterday, bringing the death toll to 29,954.
- Six Palestinian children (in Gaza) have lost their lives due to malnutrition. There have been warnings that a significant number of Palestinians could face starvation in the coming days as a direct consequence of the Israeli blockade.

=== 29 February ===
- In the Al-Rashid humanitarian aid incident, also known as Flour Massacre, at least 118 Palestinian civilians died and at least 760 were injured when Israel Defense Forces opened fire at an aid site. Some died from gunshot wounds, some from mass panic.
- The Gaza Health Ministry reported that at least 81 Palestinians were killed in Israeli attacks in the past 24 hours, bringing the death toll to 30,035.
- Four Palestinian children died of starvation in the Kamal Adwan hospital in northern Gaza.

== March ==
=== 1 March ===
- The Gaza Health Ministry reported that 193 Palestinians were killed in Israeli attacks in the past 24 hours, bringing the death toll to 30,228.
- Israeli settlers attacked the homes of Palestinians with stones on the outskirts of Jalud, southeast of Nablus.
- The Al-Qassam Brigades said that Israeli bombardment killed seven hostages.

=== 2 March ===
- The Gaza Health Ministry reported that at least 92 Palestinians were killed in Israeli attacks in the past 24 hours, bringing the death toll to 30,320.
- Fifteen people were killed in an Israeli attack on a home in Deir el-Balah, while another 11 were killed in an attack on a tent housing displaced Palestinians near Tal Al-Sultan Hospital in Rafah.
- The MV Rubymar, which was struck by a Houthi anti-ship missile on 18 February, sunk off the coast of Yemen.
- Israel announced that three soldiers of the Bislamach Brigade were killed fighting in southern Gaza, bringing the IDF death toll there to 245.
- A 13 year-old Palestinian child was shot and killed by Israeli forces near a separation wall near Jalazone, West Bank.
- Pro-Houthi media claimed that the US and UK conducted three airstrikes in northern Yemen.
- Unspecified Iranian-backed fighters conducted an anti-tank guided missile attack that killed a farmer and injured seven others near the Israel-Lebanon border.
- An IAF strike on Rafah killed 14 Palestinians, mostly children.

=== 3 March ===
- The Gaza Health Ministry reported that at least 90 Palestinians were killed in Israeli attacks in the past 24 hours, bringing the death toll to 30,410.
- At least eight people were killed after the IDF bombed an aid truck in Deir el-Balah.
- An IAF strike on Rafah killed 14 Palestinians, mostly children.
- 55 people were arrested by Israeli forces during overnight raids in several locations across the West Bank.

=== 4 March ===
- The Gaza Health Ministry reported that at least 124 Palestinians were killed in Israeli attacks in the past 24 hours, bringing the death toll to 30,534.
- The Al-Asqa martyrs' brigades detonated an IED that destroyed an IDF bulldozer in Tulkarm and claimed to have injured an Israeli soldier in Ramallah.
- The PIJ launched two rockets from the Gaza Strip into southern Israel.
- Hezbollah said that it repelled two Israeli ground operations in southern Lebanon.
- After the World Health Organization visited al-Awda and Kamal Adwan hospitals, Tedros Adhanom Ghebreyesus reported "severe levels of malnutrition, children dying of starvation, serious shortages of fuel, food and medical supplies, hospital buildings destroyed".

=== 5 March ===
- The Gaza Health Ministry reported that at least 97 Palestinians were killed in Israeli attacks in the past 24 hours, bringing the death toll to 30,631.
- Israeli forces bombed a mosque sheltering civilians in Deir el-Balah, killing one Palestinian woman and injuring 20.
- Israeli forces opened fire on Palestinians seeking aid from a supply convoy entering Gaza City.
- An Israeli air strike on a home in Khan Yunis killed at least eight people and injured several more.

=== 6 March ===
- The Barbados-flagged, Greek-owned cargo ship MV True Confidence was hit by a missile near the port of Aden, killing three sailors and injuring four others. The Houthis claimed responsibility for the attack.
- The Gaza Health Ministry reported that at least 86 Palestinians were killed in Israeli attacks in the past 24 hours, bringing the death toll to 30,717.
- Israel announced a soldier of the Oketz Unit was killed fighting in southern Gaza, bringing the IDF death toll there to 247.
- The World Health Organization stated 8,000 wounded people in Gaza needed referrals to receive treatment outside of Gaza.

=== 7 March ===
- The Gaza Health Ministry reported that at least 83 Palestinians were killed in Israeli attacks in the past 24 hours, bringing the death toll to 30,800.
- An Israeli settlement planning authority approved permits for 3,500 new illegal settlement housing units in the occupied West Bank.
- At least five people were killed in an Israeli bombing of a mosque in Jabalia.

=== 8 March ===
- The Gaza Health Ministry reported that at least 78 Palestinians were killed in Israeli attacks in the past 24 hours, bringing the death toll to 30,878.
- Five people were killed in Rafah after they were crushed by airdropped aid packages. and 2 were killed in Gaza City by faulty air packages.
- Three rockets were fired from Gaza to Sderot.

=== 9 March ===
- The Gaza Health Ministry reported that at least 82 Palestinians were killed in Israeli attacks in the past 24 hours, bringing the death toll to 30,960.
- At least 20 people were killed in Israeli attacks on residential buildings in central and southern Gaza, with many more wounded and missing under the rubble.
- Israeli forces infrastructure and prompted clashes during raids in the Nur Shams camp near Tulkarm.
- WHO chief Tedros Adhanom Ghebreyesus stated, "Almost 31,000 people have lost their lives, 72,000+ have been injured, and thousands are missing. 406 attacks on health care, 118 health workers are in detention, and 1 in 3 hospitals is only partially or minimally functional. When is enough enough?"

=== 10 March ===
- The Gaza Health Ministry reported that at least 85 Palestinians were killed in Israeli attacks in the past 24 hours, bringing the death toll to 31,045.
- According to UNRWA, there are more than 187,000 newly displaced people in Gaza, many of them sheltering at UNRWA schools, and many of them children.
- The Al-Aqsa Martyrs Hospital reported they could not accept new patients due to a lack of medical supplies, stating they could no longer provide quality care.

=== March 11 ===
- The Gaza Health Ministry reported that at least 67 Palestinians were killed in Israeli attacks in the past 24 hours, bringing the death toll to 31,112.
- UNOCHA reported that al-Ahli Hospital and the Sahaba Hospital in Gaza City were overwhelmed by structural damage, understaffing, and being undersupplied.
- Diabetic patients reported difficulty finding and receiving dialysis treatment because of shortages of supplies and staff.

=== March 14 ===
- UNRWA stated that 12 hospitals remained partially operational in Gaza, with only two offering maternity care.

=== March 16 ===
- The head of the International Federation of Red Cross and Red Crescent Societies stated, "The healthcare situation is on the brink of collapse with hospitals facing desperate conditions".

=== March 18 ===
- Israel launched a raid on Al Shifa Hospital.

=== March 25 ===
- Three hospitals — al-Shifa Hospital, al-Amal, and Nasser Hospitals — were besieged by Israeli forces.

== April ==
=== 1 April ===
- Israel announced that a soldier of the 7th Armoured Brigade was killed fighting in southern Gaza, bringing the admitted death toll of Israeli forces to 256.
- Israeli Forces withdrew from the al-Shifa hospital leaving behind huge destruction.
- Seven World Central Kitchen (WCK) aid workers were killed when three of their marked cars were destroyed in the Gaza Strip by Israeli forces.

=== 2 April ===
- The Gaza Health Ministry reported that at least 71 Palestinians were killed in Israeli attacks in the last 24 hours, bringing the death toll to 32,916.

=== 5 April ===
- The Gaza Health Ministry reported that at least 54 Palestinians were killed in Israeli attacks in the last 24 hours, bringing the death toll to 33,091.

=== 6 April ===
- The Gaza Health Ministry reported that at least 46 Palestinians were killed in Israeli attacks in the last 24 hours, bringing the death toll to 33,137.

=== 7 April ===
- Israeli forces withdrew from the western parts of Khan Yunis, leaving the Nahal Brigade as the only Israeli brigade stationed in Gaza Strip.
- Two people were wounded during a shooting attack at vehicles on highway near Qalqilya, West Bank.

=== 8 April ===
- The Gaza Health Ministry reported that at least 32 Palestinians were killed in Israeli attacks in the last 24 hours, bringing the death toll to 33,207.
- At least 84 bodies of dead Palestinians were found after the withdrawal of Israeli forces from Khan Yunis.

=== 24 April ===
- The director of the Kuwaiti hospital in Rafah stated, "Rafah governorate has become a continuous target... The Israeli occupation uses internationally prohibited weapons, and the type of injuries we receive is unprecedented, such as amputation of limbs and laceration of the body".
- The Palestinian Centre for Human Rights stated that 300 people, including 80 children, were suffering from thalassemia due to a lack of medication.
- The Gaza Health Ministry reported an increase in hepatitis and meningitis cases and called for support from "all relevant national, international, and humanitarian institutions".

=== 30 April ===
Turkish Cop attacked by Turkish tourist, This cop is moderately hurt and the passenger is killed by police

== May ==
=== 4 May ===
The Israeli Border Police commandos Yamam raided Tulkarem, fighting for over 12 hours, leaving five rebels dead and one officer seriously wounded.

=== 26 May ===
- Tel al-Sultan attack in Rafah by the IDF.

== June ==
The previous OCHA flash updates system has been changed. OCHA will issue a Humanitarian Situation Update (HSU) three times weekly covering the Gaza Strip on Mondays and Fridays and the West Bank, including East Jerusalem, on Wednesdays.

=== 4 June ===
Referring to the killing of over 500 Palestinians since 7 October 2023 by Israeli forces and settlers, Volker Türk said that as well as in Gaza, "the people of the occupied West Bank are also being subjected to day after day of unprecedented bloodshed".

=== 5 June ===
For the period 28 May to 3 June (and cumulatively from 7 October 2023), OCHA HSU #175 West Bank reported 6 Palestinians killed by Israeli forces (total 508) and 2 Israeli soldiers killed by Palestinians (total 12) while 8 Israelis and 4 Palestinian attackers were killed in Israel.

=== 7 June ===
OCHA HSU Gaza Strip #176 for 3 to 7 June published.

=== 10 June ===
OCHA HSU Gaza Strip #177 for 7 to 10 June published.

=== 12 June ===
For the period 4 to 10 June, OCHA HSU #178 West Bank reported 13 Palestinians killed by Israeli forces (total 521) and 0 Israelis killed by Palestinians (total 12) while 8 Israelis and 4 Palestinian attackers were killed in Israel.

=== 14 June ===
OCHA HSU Gaza Strip #179 for 10 to 14 June published.

=== 18 June ===
Volker Türk warned the UN Human Rights Council that "The situation in the West Bank, including East Jerusalem, is dramatically deteriorating" and that deaths of Palestinians "in many cases raising serious concerns of unlawful killings".

=== 19 June ===
OCHA HSU Gaza Strip and West Bank combined #180 for 11 to 18 June published.

=== 19 June ===
A UNHRC report into six high casualty Israeli attacks between 7 October and 2 December 2023 said Israeli forces "may have systematically violated the principles of distinction, proportionality, and precautions in attack", noting that no transparent investigations had been made.

=== 21 June ===
- OCHA HSU Gaza Strip #181 for 18 to 21 June published.
- June 2024 Al-Mawasi refugee camp attack by the IDF.

=== 22 June ===
- Israel has killed 101 Palestinians in the last 24 hours.
- People attend a demonstration in Tel Aviv against Israeli Prime Minister Benjamin Netanyahu's government and a call for the release of hostages in Gaza.

=== 27 June ===
- In the last 24 hours, Gaza's health ministry mentioned: 47 Palestinians have lost their lives and 52 have been injured, as the conflict persists in southern/central/northern Gaza.

=== 28 June ===
Three medics from Gaza's Civil Defence were tragically killed by Israeli aircraft, with 12 others sustaining injuries as they bravely conducted rescue operations in the Bureij refugee camp in central Gaza.

=== 29 June ===
- The Gaza Health Ministry reported that at least 40 Palestinians were killed and, 224 wounded in Israeli attacks in the last 24 hours.

=== 30 June ===
- Israeli forces arrived in Shujayea, located in northern Gaza City, utilizing tanks and drones. The residents of Shujayea found themselves confined due to the Israeli attacks.
- According to the Gaza Health Ministry, a total of 43 Palestinians have lost their lives due to Israeli assaults within the past day, resulting in the overall death toll reaching 37,877.

== July ==
=== 1 July ===
- Israeli settlers have dumped waste into the al-Auja spring, north of the West Bank city of Jericho, to deprive Palestinians of potable water.

=== 2 July ===
- The Gaza Health Ministry reported that at least 25 Palestinians were killed and 81 wounded in Israeli attacks in the last 24 hours, bringing the death toll to 37,925.
- Israel orders Khan Younis evacuation. UNRWA condemns Israel’s ‘forced displacement’ order for 250,000 people in Khan Younis.

=== 3 July ===
- The Israeli air strike, as reported by The Associated Press, resulted in the deaths of 12 Palestinians, nine of whom were from the same family, within a designated "safe zone".

=== 5 July ===
- Pro-Palestinian demonstrations were held in Jordan and Yemen.

=== 6 July ===
- According to The Ministry of Health in Gaza, 29 individuals lost their lives in Gaza within the last day, with news surfacing that five Palestinian journalists were among the casualties. Since October 7, a total of 38,098 people have lost their lives and 87,705 have sustained injuries as a result of Israel's military campaign in Gaza.
- Israeli helicopters have commenced firing on the eastern area of Bureij refugee camp in central Gaza.
- The Gaza Ministry of Health has said that the continuation of the fuel crisis has suspended the work of other health institutions operating in Gaza.

=== 7 July ===
- According to the Health Ministry in Gaza, the number of casualties from Israeli attacks has reached 38,153 deaths and 87,828 injuries since October 7. In the last 24 hours, 55 Palestinians were killed and 123 were wounded.

=== 9 July ===
- At least 50 Palestinians were killed in attacks across Gaza City and Deir el-Balah. A multi-story building in Nuseirat refugee camp was hit by an Israeli airstrike causing seventeen deaths. Another attack in Bureij Refugee Camp killed at least nine Palestinians, including at least five children.
- Al-Awda school attack by the IDF.

=== 13 July ===
- 13 July 2024 al-Mawasi attack by the IDF.

=== 22 July ===
- 22 July 2024 Khan Yunis attack by the IDF.

== August ==
=== 17 August ===
- August 2024 Deir el-Balah attacks by the IDF.

=== 28 August ===
- The 2024 Israeli military operation in the West Bank begins.

== September ==
=== 6 September ===
- Killing of Ayşenur Eygi by an IDF soldier.

== October ==
=== 16 October ===
- Yahya Sinwar, leader of Hamas in Gaza and mastermind of the October 7 attacks, is killed by Israeli soldiers in Rafah. His killing is discovered, confirmed, and published the next day.

=== 18 October ===
- 2024 Neot HaKikar shooting: Jordanian terrorists infiltrate Israeli territory south of the Dead Sea and shoot Israeli troops.

=== 27 October ===
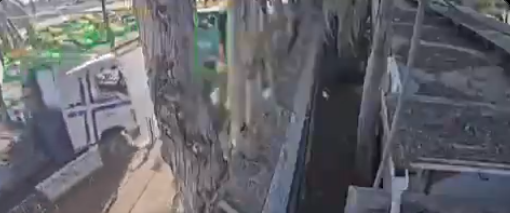
2024 Tel Aviv truck attack

At least one person was killed and 35 others were injured in a truck-ramming attack on a tour bus of pensioners near the Glilot military base and the Mossad headquarters in Ramat HaSharon, Israel. The driver was killed by an armed bystander. The incident occurred at around 10:00 local time at a bus stop in the Glilot Junction on Aharon Yariv Boulevard while a bus was disembarking passengers, most of whom were pensioners heading to a nearby museum. Bezalel Carmi, aged 72, from Rishon Lezion, died and 40 others were injured, including ten in critical condition. Eight people were found pinned down under the vehicle.

The perpetrator was identified as Rami Nasrallah Natour, an Arab Israeli from Qalansawe in Israel's Central District. The company which owned the truck said that Natour had deviated from his set route towards the site of the attack. On May 22, 2026, the 17-year-old brother of Natour shot and killed an Israeli couple inside their car near Moshav Mishmar Ayalon. He was arrested.

Carmi was the son of Holocaust survivor, Avraham Carmi, aged 96. At his funeral, his father eulogized him as a gentle man. Hamas described the incident as a "heroic ramming attack" committed "in response to the crimes committed by the Zionist occupation". The attack was also praised by Palestinian Islamic Jihad. National Security Minister Itamar Ben-Gvir called for Natour's family to be deported from Israel.

== December ==
=== 26 December ===
- Five Palestinian Journalists were killed in the Nuseirat Refugee Camp after an Israeli airstrike hit their press vehicle.

== See also ==
- 2024 in Israel
- 2024 in the State of Palestine
- 2024 Iran–Israel conflict
- Israeli incursions in the West Bank during the Gaza war
- List of military engagements during the Gaza war
- Timeline of the Gaza Strip healthcare collapse
- Timeline of the Israel–Hezbollah conflict (2023–present)
