= December 2024 Nuseirat refugee camp attack =

Israeli attack on refugee camp in Gaza

- Part of the Gaza war
- Location within the Gaza Strip
- Location: Nuseirat refugee camp, Gaza Strip, Palestine
- Date: 12 December 2024
- Attack type: Airstrike
- Deaths: 33
- Injuries: 50
- Perpetrator: Israel Defense Forces

On 12 December 2024, the Israeli Air Force conducted an airstrike on a residential block in the Nuseirat refugee camp in Deir al-Balah Governorate which resulted in at least 33 civilian deaths and approximately 50 injuries. The airstrike targeted a postal facility being used as a civilian shelter, and caused significant damage to adjacent residential buildings.

== Background ==
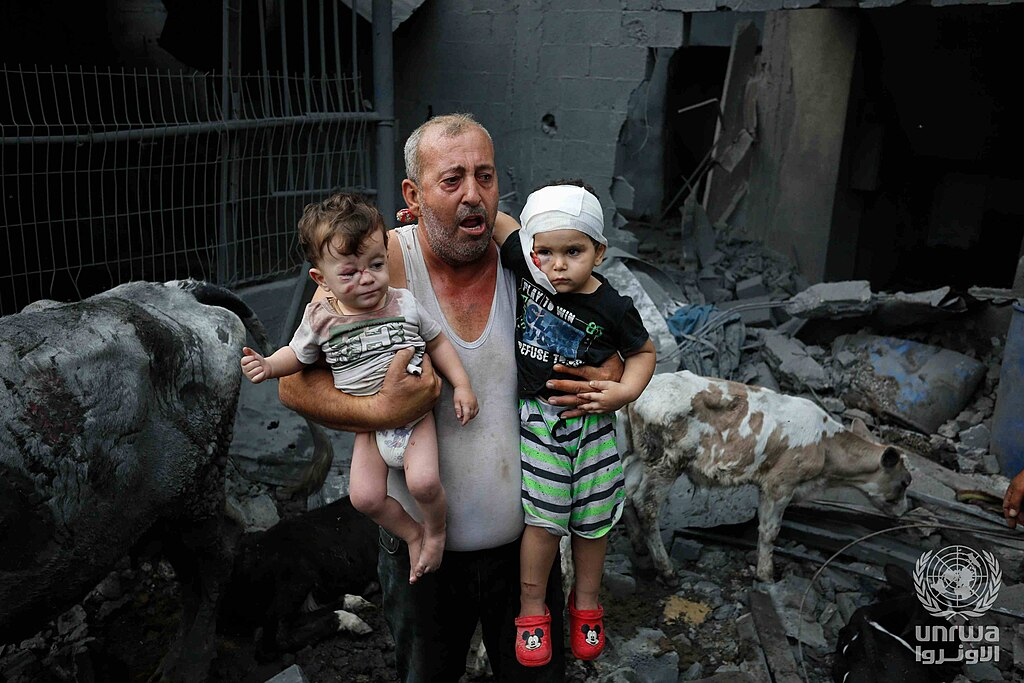
A Palestinian refugee carries his injured grandchildren from the Israeli bombing of Nuseirat Camp, Gaza Strip.

Nuseirat (Arabic: مخيّم النصيرات) is a Palestinian refugee camp located in the middle of the Gaza Strip, five kilometers north-east of Deir al-Balah. The Nuseirat refugee camp has been bombed repeatedly since the start of the Gaza war. On 18 October 2023 the Grand Nuseirat Mosque was bombed and destroyed by Israeli airstrikes.

On 8 June 2024, the IDF and Yamam rescued four Israeli hostages held by Hamas in Nuseirat, including Noa Argamani, during a rescue operation. The Gaza Health Ministry reported that at least 274 Palestinians were killed and 698 wounded in the Israeli airstrikes on the refugee camp during the operation, causing international outrage and the attack deemed a massacre.

== Attack ==
On 12 December 2024, the Israeli Air Force conducted an airstrike targeting a high-rise residential structure containing a postal facility, which was being used as civilian shelter for Gazans displaced due to the ongoing Israeli invasion of the Gaza Strip. Emergency medical personnel reported that the airstrike caused the structural collapse of the high-rise with smoke rising from the debris, and caused significant damage to adjacent residential buildings.

=== Casualties ===
Two medical facilities, al-Awda Hospital in northern Gaza and al-Aqsa Hospital in central Gaza, received casualties from the strike. The strike resulted in significant civilian casualties, with at least 33 confirmed deaths and approximately 50 individuals sustaining injuries, with children comprising the majority of the wounded. The airstrike primarily impacted the al-Sheikh Ali extended family, who comprised the majority of casualties. The Palestinian Health Ministry incorporated these casualties into their broader statistics of the conflict, which by this point had documented over 44,800 Palestinian fatalities since October 2023.

== Responses ==
The Gaza Government Media Office characterized the attack as a "barbaric and heinous massacre," emphasizing that Israeli forces had knowledge of the civilian nature of the target area. The office specifically noted the presence of residential buildings housing "civilians, children, women, and displaced persons".

Israeli authorities did not immediately issue a statement regarding the strike.

== See also ==
- Attacks on refugee camps in the Gaza war
- August 2024 Deir el-Balah attacks
- Al-Sardi school attack
