= Siege of Khan Yunis =

2023 military engagement in the Gaza Strip

Coordinates: 31.343°N 34.309°E

- Part of the Israeli invasion of the Gaza Strip during the Gaza war
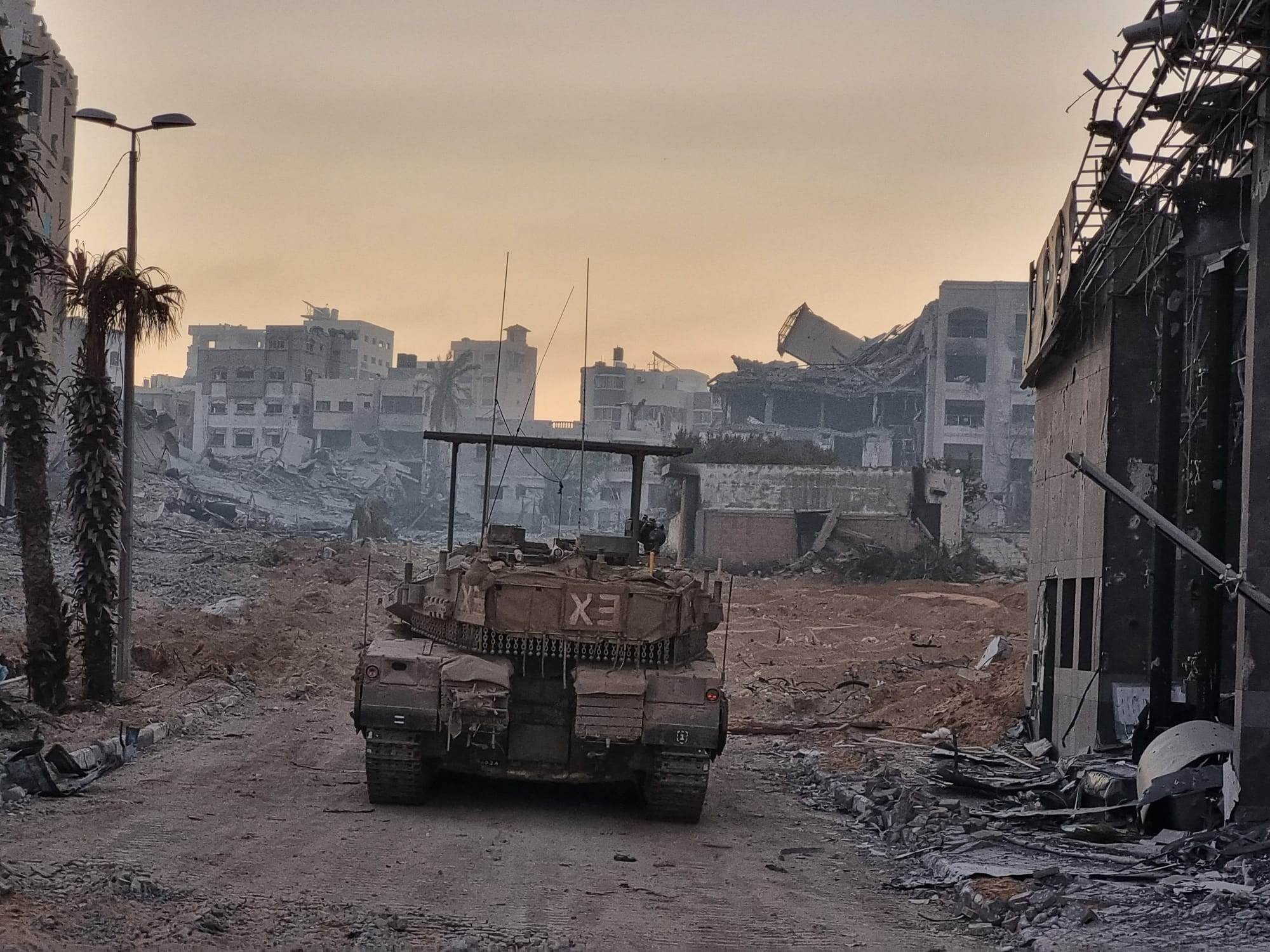
- Israeli Merkava Mark 4 in Khan Yunis
Date	1 December 2023 – 7 April 2024 (4 months and 6 days); Siege: 23 January – 7 April 2024 (2 months, 2 weeks and 1 day)
Location	Khan Yunis, Gaza Strip
Result	Israeli withdrawal from southern Gaza: Hamas remains combat effective

Belligerents
Israel	Hamas Palestinian allies: Palestinian Islamic Jihad (PIJ); Popular Front for the Liberation of Palestine (PFLP); Democratic Front for the Liberation of Palestine (DFLP); (Fatah) Al-Aqsa Martyrs' Brigades; Popular Resistance Committees (PRC); Palestinian Mujahideen Movement (PMM)

Commanders and leaders
(Israel) Yaron Finkelman (Israel) Dan Goldfuss (Israel) Elad Tzuri (Israel) Omer Cohen (Israel) Ami Biton (Israel) Oded Ziman (Israel) Yaniv Barot (Israel) Liron Batito (Israel) Dvir Hever (Israel) Elad Shoshan	Mohammed Deif; Marwan Issa; Mohammed Sinwar; Rafa Salama

Units involved
Israel Defense Forces; Israeli Ground Forces; 98th Paratroopers Division; 35th Paratroopers Brigade; 55th Paratroopers Brigade; Oz Brigade; Duvdevan Unit; Maglan Unit; Egoz Unit; 7th Armored Brigade; Givati Brigade; Kfir Brigade; Kiryati Brigade; 5th Brigade; Golani Brigade; 12th Battalion; Israeli Air Force	(Palestine) Palestinian Joint Operations Room; (Hamas) Al-Qassam Brigades; Khan Yunis Brigade; North Khan Yunis Battalion; South Khan Yunis Battalion; Eastern (Khan Yunis) Battalion; (Palestinian Islamic Jihad) Al-Quds Brigades; (Popular Front for the Liberation of Palestine) Abu Ali Mustafa Brigades; National Resistance Brigades; Al-Nasser Salah al-Deen Brigades; Al-Aqsa Martyrs' Brigades; Mujahideen Brigades

Casualties and losses
(Israel) 37 soldiers killed (Israel) 1 Namer destroyed Per Hamas: (Israel) 3 Merkava tanks disabled	Per Israel: (Palestine) 3,000+ fighters killed
- 390+ civilians killed (per the Palestinian Civil Defence); ~8,000 civilians missing under rubble (Per the Palestinian Civil Defence)

The battle of Khan Yunis, which evolved into the siege of Khan Yunis in late January 2024, began on 1 December 2023 in the midst of the Israeli invasion of the Gaza Strip.

== Battle ==
=== December 2023 ===
On 1 December 2023, the Israel Defense Forces (IDF) launched artillery strikes and air raids on the city of Khan Yunis, with Israeli Air Force fighter jets striking over 50 targets in the area. These artillery and airstrikes continued for the next few days in large numbers.

On 3 December, Israeli forces announced the expansion of the ground invasion to the south of Gaza using ground and armored forces. On the same day, Hamas announced that it had targeted Israeli troops and armored vehicles with mortar shells and Yassin rocket-propelled grenades.

On 5 December, the Israeli forces claimed that their troops had reached the center of Khan Yunis. They stated that this was the most intense day of battles since the start of ground operations, in terms of Hamas fighters killed, the number of engagements and the use of fire from the ground and the air.

The Palestinian Islamic Jihad published a video showing militants confronting Israeli forces penetrating east of the city. Also, Hamas announced that they counted the total or partial destruction of 24 military vehicles in Khan Yunis. They also stated that they eliminated eight Israeli troops with sniper attacks and that they successfully demolished a building housing Israeli troops with a barrel bomb and TBG explosives, causing the complete collapse of the building.

On 10 December, the IDF announced that six IDF soldiers had been killed whilst fighting in Khan Yunis.

On 18 December, the IDF announced that the Duvdevan Unit and the Oketz Unit had destroyed multiple tunnels and a drone factory during advances in Khan Yunis while seven IDF soldiers were killed. The destruction of rocket launchers aimed at Israel degraded the ability of Hamas to launch rocket strikes on Israel. It was reported that Hamas was transferring forces from across the Gaza Strip to reinforce the Khan Yunis Brigade which the IDF estimated would take months to destroy.

On 19 December, the al-Qassam Brigades announced that they had detonated a rigged house when Israeli forces entered the building, and also announced a separate incident where they trapped Israeli forces in a house and detonated anti-personnel charges and thermobaric shells. The al-Qassam Brigades claimed both attacks killed and wounded Israeli forces but did not present evidence to support their claims. Meanwhile, IDF forces were reinforced by an additional brigade and engineering force.

On 23 December, the al-Qassam Brigades claimed that they lured five Israeli SOF engineers into a tunnel rigged with explosives at the east of Khan Yunis, and that they killed all of the five engineers.

=== January 2024 ===
On 4 January 2024, the IDF claimed to have significantly degraded the command and control of Hamas's Khan Yunis Brigade's northern and eastern battalions with the destruction of tunnel systems, infrastructure and deaths of company commanders. The IDF's 4th Brigade attacked the southern flank of Hamas's Khan Yunis Brigade as the IDF surrounded the city. In turn, Hamas' naval special operations forces reinforced Palestinian fighters in Khan Yunis via tunnel systems while the al-Aqsa Martyrs' Brigades, the National Resistance Brigades and the al-Quds Brigades fought the IDF in different areas of the city.

On 12 January, the IDF announced that airstrikes directed by the 98th Division killed a commander in Hamas' Nukhba forces and six other Hamas fighters. The commander participated in the October 7 attacks, according to Israel. The IDF also destroyed weapon caches found in the area. The al-Quds Brigades attacked an Israeli bulldozer in the city while firing mortars against Israeli forces in central Khan Yunis together with al-Aqsa Martyrs Brigades fighters.

On 21 January, Israeli forces discovered an underground tunnel in a civilian area of Khan Yunis which contained five prison cells where Hamas was believed to have kept the hostages. The IDF published children's drawings as proof the hostages had been held there.

On 24 January, 21 Israeli soldiers were killed in an explosion and subsequent building collapse in Khan Yunis, making it the deadliest day for the IDF since the ground invasion began.

=== February – March 2024 ===
On 1 February, Israeli Defense Minister Yoav Gallant visited Khan Yunis and announced that all Hamas battalions in the city had been dismantled but the IDF had not yet claimed operational control over the area.

On 15 February, the IDF raided the Nasser Hospital, alleging that Hamas was holding Israeli hostages at the facility and that it possibly contained bodies of some dead hostages. The IDF arrested dozens of people it alleged to be militants.

On 16 February, the IDF raided the Khan Yunis refugee camp. Special forces soldiers of the Maglan unit backed by armored and engineering forces infiltrated the camp, which had not been conquered by the IDF, and surprised the militants in it, with the soldiers positioning themselves to trap as many militants as possible. At least 30 militants were killed in the fighting.

On 18 February, the IDF reported that Hamas's Khan Yunis Brigade no longer existed as a military entity but other Hamas-aligned militias continued attacks against the IDF.

On 19 February, the IDF reported that clearing operations in western Khan Yunis were being finished with Israeli forces carrying out airstrikes to eliminate Hamas units trying to advance towards the city. The Democratic Front for the Liberation of Palestine claimed to have attacked Israeli forces near Nasser Hospital with IEDs and RPGs. Hamas reported its fighters had returned from fighting areas in western Khan Yunis after targeting 15 Israeli soldiers in a house.

On 9 March, the Institute for the Study of War published that Hamas "remains combat effective" in Khan Yunis.

=== April 2024 ===
On 6 April, four Israeli soldiers were killed in an ambush in Khan Yunis, with the militants escaping into a tunnel. Other Israeli soldiers attempted to pursue the attackers but noticed that the route was booby-trapped and therefore ended the pursuit. Another militant squad in the area fired an RPG at an Israeli tank, causing no casualties. The tank returned fire and killed the militants. Two days later, the al-Qassam Brigades published footage of the operation, which they had named the "Ambush of the Righteous", depicting a complex and meticulously planned attack with several phases.

On 7 April, all Israeli forces withdrew from Khan Yunis as part of a general withdrawal of most Israeli forces from the southern Gaza Strip. In an announcement the same day, Defense Minister Yoav Gallant claimed that Hamas forces had ceased to exist as a military force in Khan Yunis and stated the withdrawal was in preparation for the planned Rafah offensive. However, rockets were fired by Palestinian forces in Khan Yunis immediately after the IDF's withdrawal. White House National Security Communications Advisor John Kirby claimed the Israeli withdrawal was a "rest and refit" rather than a preparation for an offensive. According to the Institute for the Study of War, citing unspecified sources within the IDF, the IDF hoped the withdrawal would allow displaced Palestinians in Rafah to migrate to parts of Khan Yunis and the central Gaza Strip which would facilitate an Israeli clearing operation into Rafah.

== Aftermath ==
Following the withdrawal of Israeli forces, the Palestinian Civil Defence accessed the city and were able to extract 280 bodies by early April 2024. They estimated that about 8,000 civilians remained trapped under the rubble in Khan Yunis. Later the Palestinian Civil Defense crew discovered a mass grave near the Nasser Medical Complex and had recovered over 310 bodies by 23 April.

The Jerusalem Post reported that Hamas had begun mass recruitment of 18-year-olds in Khan Yunis in an attempt to replace the massive casualties suffered and reconstitute its forces, but this was denied by the IDF. However, the loss of tunnels, loss of factories producing rockets and weapons, deaths of experienced commanders and bases during the offensive was expected to delay Hamas's ability to regain its pre-war strength.

On 22 July, the IDF began a renewed invasion of Khan Yunis, marking the second attempt to dismantle Hamas forces in the city. After a week, it also ended in an Israeli withdrawal. An official in Gaza stated that the incursion had killed about 300 people, as the army concluded its siege of Khan Yunis.

== See also ==
- List of military engagements during the Gaza war
- Nasser Hospital siege
