= Al-Awda school attack =

Israeli attack on UNRWA-run school in Khan Yunis region

- Part of the Gaza war, the Gaza genocide and the attacks on schools during the Israeli invasion of Gaza
- Location within the Gaza Strip
- Location: 31°20′2″N 34°20′18″E; Abasan al-Kabira, Khan Yunis Governorate, Gaza Strip
- Date: 9 July 2024
- Attack type: Airstrike, school bombing
- Deaths: 31+ Palestinians
- Injuries: 53+ Palestinians
- Perpetrator: Israel Defense Forces

On 9 July 2024, the Israel Defense Forces bombed Al-Awda school – the UNRWA-run school that had been converted into a displacement shelter, hosting refugees from the Israeli invasion – in Abasan al-Kabira near the city of Khan Yunis, in the Gaza Strip, Palestine. At least 31 Palestinians were killed in the attack while over 53 were injured; most of the casualties were women and children. Many of the victims were refugees from Rafah following Israel's Rafah offensive. The attack was the fourth attack on a Palestinian school conducted by the Israel Defense Forces over the prior four days.

== Background ==
On 6 July, UNRWA-run al-Jawni school sheltering 2,000 refugees at the Nuseirat refugee camp in central Gaza was targeted by an IDF raid which killed sixteen Palestinians. On 7 July, the IDF targeted the Latin Patriarchate-owned Holy Family school located in Gaza City housing hundreds of refugees, killing four. On 8 July, IDF force struck a different Nuseirat UNRWA-run school in, causing several injuries requiring treatment in a local hospital. Philippe Lazzarini, the head of UNRWA, stated two-thirds of all UNRWA schools in Gaza had been hit since October 2023.

== Airstrike ==
Al Jazeera video of the Al-Awda School attack
- External video
- Video of the air strike and its aftermath taken by a football spectator who was filming the game. Contains graphic images of severe injury.
- NBC News video on YouTube incorporating parts of the Al Jazeera footage and featuring comments from survivors

During the evening of 9 July 2024, Israeli Defense Forces conducted an airstrike that targeted a gate at the entrance of al-Awda School in Abasan al-Kabira, Khan Yunis Governorate. A US-made GBU-39 precision-guided glide bomb, manufactured by Boeing, was used in the attack. Several dozen were outside at the time of the attack, spectating a soccer game being played in a courtyard. According to a witness, a warplane flew overhead and fired a missile at young men sitting at an internet cafe, after which "it was screams and body parts everywhere". At least 19 deceased Palestinians from the airstrike were brought to nearby Nasser Hospital, in addition to 53 injured Palestinians. Health officials stated the majority of casualties were women and children. Weapons experts identified fragments from the strike as 250-pound GBU-39 bombs. Workers at the hospital expected the number of dead to increase. The death toll had risen to 31 by the next day.

A 14-year-old survivor of the attack stated, "I was walking, when suddenly I found myself flying... I saw all the wounded. Just body parts." Another child survivor stated he was the only person in his family who survived the strike.

== Reactions ==
Hamas condemned the attack and said in a statement: "The bombing of the school is an Israeli insistence on the war of extermination, and confirmation of the occupation's continuation of the crimes of murder, without regard to the consequences of its crimes or the laws and treaties that were established to protect civilians in wars." It further called upon "the Arab peoples and those it called the peoples of the free world to move in support of the Palestinian people, and it also called on the people of the West Bank to activate all tools of support to engage with Israel". Hamas also called for "rage marches in all cities of the world to condemn the massacres and to demand an end to the ongoing war in the besieged Gaza strip".

The Israeli Ministry of Defense said that the attack used "precision weapons" to target an area near the school where a Hamas fighter who took part in the October 7 attacks on Israel was located. The ministry stated that it was investigating reports that Palestinian civilians were harmed in the attack.

European Union Chief of Foreign Policy Josep Borrell strongly condemned the attack, lamenting the cost of the war to innocent civilians while calling for an immediate ceasefire agreement to free the reminding hostages and provide sufficient humanitarian aid to the Gaza Strip. Borrell stated, "We condemn any violation of international law: those responsible must be held accountable." Discussing the spate of Israeli airstrikes on schools in mid-July 2024, the French foreign ministry stated, "We call for these strikes to be fully investigated... It is unacceptable that schools, especially those housing civilians displaced by the fighting, should be targeted." The German Federal Foreign Office stated, "People seeking shelter in schools getting killed is unacceptable. The repeated attacks on schools by the Israeli army must stop and an investigation must come quickly."

== See also ==
- Al-Sardi school attack
- Attacks on schools during the Israeli invasion of Gaza
- Al-Fakhoora school airstrikes
