= 22 July 2024 Khan Yunis attack =

Israeli attack on civilian areas in Khan Yunis

July 2024 Khan Yunis attack
- Part of the second battle of Khan Yunis during the Gaza war and genocide
- Location: Bani Suheila, eastern Khan Yunis, Gaza Strip
- Date: 22 July 2024
- Attack type: Airstrikes, tank shelling
- Deaths: 73
- Injuries: 270+
- Perpetrator: Israel Defense Forces: Israeli Air Force

On 22 July 2024, Israel sent tanks and launched airstrikes on eastern Khan Yunis in the Gaza Strip. The IDF stated that the targets included gunmen, buildings used by militant groups, booby-trapped buildings, and other militant infrastructure. The Gaza Health Ministry reported that 73 Palestinians were killed by Israeli fire, while more than 270 were injured.

== Background ==
Earlier on 22 July, the Israel Defense Forces issued new evacuation orders after it claimed that there were renewed Palestinian militant attacks and rocket attacks from eastern Khan Yunis. Israel downsized the humanitarian zone where 1.7 million Palestinians took refuge and adjusted its boundaries, reducing it from 65 km^{2} to 48 km^{2}.

== Attack ==
Shortly after having issued the evacuation orders, Israel began its third assault on Khan Yunis, giving little time for Palestinians to find safety. Israeli tanks advanced for more than 2 km into Bani Suheila, forcing civilians to flee under fire. 73 Palestinians were killed and more than 270 injured by tank shelling and air bombardment in Bani Suheila. The IDF reported that the targets included gunmen, buildings used by terror groups, booby-trapped buildings, and other terror infrastructure.

An eyewitness reported that "No one told us to evacuate. They brought four floors crashing down on civilians", while another said that "It is like doomsday, people are fleeing under fire, many are dead and wounded on the roads.

== Aftermath and death toll ==
The Gaza Health Ministry reported that 73 Palestinians were killed and more than 270 were injured.

According to medics at Nasser Hospital in Khan Yunis, the hospital was overwhelmed with patients, the wounded were being treated on the floor, and the situation was "out of control". Nasser Hospital urged residents to donate blood due to the large number of casualties being rushed into the medical center.

A resident of Gaza who lost several relatives during the attack reported "We are tired. We are tired in Gaza. Every day our children are martyred – every day, every moment".

== Reactions ==
=== Domestic ===
- Hamas: Hamas denounced the attack, stating that it would not deter Palestinians from remaining "steadfast in their land".
- Israel: The IDF claimed that the attack was a response to renewed Palestinian militant attacks from eastern Khan Yunis and stated "Since this morning, the IAF and IDF artillery forces have struck more than 30 terror infrastructure sites in Khan Younis, including in the area from which a projectile was launched toward Nirim in southern Israel earlier today".
