= August 2024 Deir al-Balah attacks =

August 2024 Israeli strikes in central Gaza

- Part of the Gaza war
- Locations within the Gaza Strip
- Location: Az-Zawayda and Nuseirat refugee camp, Deir al-Balah, Gaza Strip
- Date: 17 August 2024
- Attack type: Airstrikes and naval strikes
- Deaths: 34+ Palestinians
- Injuries: Multiple
- Perpetrator: Israel Defense Forces

On 17 August 2024, the Israel Defense Forces conducted a series of military attacks on az-Zawayda in Deir al-Balah and in the Nuseirat refugee camp, killing at least 34 people including a family of fifteen. The military strikes and civilian deaths were conducted shortly following the conclusion of ceasefire negotiations in Qatar between Hamas and Israel, mediated by the United States.

== Background ==
In the midst of the attacks, ceasefire negotiations were ongoing in the Qatari capital of Doha between Israel and Hamas, mediated by the United States. United States President Joe Biden made a statement on the eve of the attacks stating that he was "optimistic" about the progress made towards bridging gaps in demands and towards negotiating a ceasefire agreement.

Contrary to this, Israeli officials states that they are attempting to "lower expectations" of a ceasefire deal due to significant gaps between Israel and Hamas demands. Israeli Prime Minister Benjamin Netanyahu stated that there were multiple red lines he refused to negotiate or compromise on. Similarly, a senior official of Hamas called Biden's optimism towards both parties moving closer to a ceasefire agreement was "an illusion" and that they were "not facing a deal or real negotiations, but rather the imposing of American diktats."

== Attacks ==
An IDF air raid targeted a family home and a warehouse next to it that was being used as a shelter for displaced people near the entrance of the town of az-Zawayda in the Deir el-Balah Governorate. Eyewitness Ahmed Abu al-Ghoul reported that three rockets targeted the buildings, and that they made direct strikes on the structures. The airstrike killed fifteen members of the family of Sami Jawad al-Ejlah, a seller of goods to retailers who worked with Israel troops to distribute food across the Gaza Strip to provide aid during the humanitarian crisis. One of the surviving relatives stated that "They were all dismembered. There wasn’t a single complete body." The bodies of the victims were taken to the Shuhada al-Aqsa Hospital. A list created by the hospital reported that in addition to Sami, his two wives, eleven of their children aged from two to twenty-two, the grandmother of the children, and three separate relatives were killed in the airstrike.

A family in the Nuseirat refugee camp was struck by Israeli Navy boats firing on a residential tower, killing at least seven members.

The IDF shelled a home in the al-Hakr area killing or wounding several citizens.

== Responses ==
The Israeli Defense Forces stated that they had targeted "terrorist infrastructure" in Deir el-Balah following the launching of rockets from the area.

== See also ==
- Attacks on refugee camps in the Gaza war
- Israeli attacks on Al-Maghazi refugee camp
- Israeli war crimes in the Gaza war
- List of massacres in Palestine
- Nuseirat refugee camp massacre
- December 2024 Nuseirat refugee camp attack
