= Al-Sardi school attack =

2024 Israeli airstrike on school in Nuseirat refugee camp

- Part of the Gaza war and genocide
- Al-Sardi school (the Gaza Strip)
- Date: June 6, 2024
- Location: Nuseirat refugee camp, Gaza Strip, Palestine
- Deaths: >33 (Shuhada al-Aqsa Hospital and Gaza Health Ministry); Including 3 women, 9 children and 21 men; >35 (UNRWA); 20–30 militants (Israeli military)
- Injuries: 70+ Palestinians

On 6 June 2024, the Israel Defense Forces fired two missiles that hit Al-Sardi, a UNRWA school in the Nuseirat refugee camp. Though the complex had not been used as a school since the outbreak of the war, UNRWA said approximately 6,000 people were using it for shelter.

Shuhada al-Aqsa Hospital and the Gaza Health Ministry reported that at least 33 Palestinians were killed, including 9 children, 3 women, and 21 men. UNRWA reported at least 35 dead. The IDF said it struck Hamas militants, allegedly present at the school, and that it took extensive precautions to reduce harm to civilians. Israel said it killed 20–30 militants, and named 17 individuals that it said were militants. Eight of these names did not match hospital records, and one named referred to an eight-year-old boy according to the hospital.

The attack was condemned by the United Nations, Belgium and Oxfam. The United States said the attack did not "cross a red line". Analysis showed that American made GBU-39 precision-guided glide bombs were used in the attack.

== Background ==
UNRWA ran about 300 schools in the Gaza Strip until all educational programmes were suspended following the 7 October attack on Israel and its response. Many of these schools have been transformed into refugee centres for Gazans fleeing their homes and the fighting. Some 6,000 refugees had sought shelter at al-Sardi school. On 6 May 2024, Israel began the Rafah offensive during the Gaza war. Israel had previously been criticized during the offensive for the offensive itself and airstrikes conducted by Israel, such as the Tel Al-Sultan attack, in which 45–50 Palestinian civilians were killed in an area designated a "safe zone" for civilians in the Gaza Strip. UNRWA said 6,000 Palestinian refugees were sheltering in the school at the time of the attack. Since the start of the war, more than 180 UN agency buildings have been hit and more than 450 displaced people have been killed in those facilities.

== Attack ==
On 6 June 2024, at approximately 2 am, Israeli forces airstrike hit the classrooms on the highest floor of the Al-Sardi school in the Nuseirat refugee camp with two missiles. The strike was carried after the army declared new ground assaults and airstrikes on several refugee camps in central Gaza. The munition used in the attack was of the same variety employed in the Tel al-Sultan attack, namely a GBU-39.

== Casualties ==
UNRWA said 35 people had been killed, based on testimony of its employees at the school. Shuhada al-Aqsa Hospital records, and witnesses interviewed by The Guardian, said that 33 people were killed, including 9 children, 3 women and 21 men. An Associated Press journalist counted 33 bodies but did not look beneath the kafan. Residents explained that the attack happened on the rooms that were housing men and boys; women and girls slept in a separate part of the school. The initial estimate was that this attack left at least 40 dead, including 14 children and 9 women, and more than 74 wounded, but was subsequently downrevised. At least of the men killed was an elderly man. Two of the children had been killed beside their mother. NPR documented a bag that was labeled as containing parts of five dead children.

The IDF spokesman stated it was not aware of any civilian casualties in the attack. In response, the New York Times pointed out that both witnesses and medical personnel indicated dozens of civilian casualties. The US State Department spokesman said that reports of children killed, if true, do indicate civilian casualties and urged Israel to "be transparent".

The IDF said that Islamic Jihad "directed terror attacks from the area of the school, while exploiting it as a civilian location and as shelter". Israel said it killed 20–30 militants released the names of seventeen alleged militants it said it killed. No further evidence was given to substantiate the claim. Eight (8) of the names provided by Israel do not actually match hospital records, and one of the 'identified fighters' was recorded at the hospital as an 8-year-old boy.

Further, rescuers have said they only recovered the bodies of civilians from the site. Gazan Government Media Office Ismail Al-Thawabta rejected Israel's allegation the school had a hidden command post for Hamas. He said also that the number of dead and wounded entering Al-Aqsa Hospital is three times the clinical capacity of the hospital.

== American-made munitions ==
A CNN analysis of video from the scene and a review by an explosive weapons expert found that US-made munitions were used in the strike on the school. CNN identified fragments of at least two US-made GBU-39 small-diameter bombs (SDB) in a video filmed at the scene by a journalist working for CNN. previously, CNN verified the use of US-made weapons in the Israeli army's deadly attack on the Tel al-Sultan attack. According to The Washington Post, Weapons experts identified the Weapons used in the attack as the US-made GBU-39. Fragments visible in confirmed images from the scene define a cage code, or five-character sequence, used to identify dealers who sell weapons to the US government. The code "81873" connected this fragment to Woodward HRT, a weapons fragments manufacturer registered in Valencia, California.

Earlier, the US State Department report said it was "reasonable to assess" that Israel violated international law while using US weapons in its military operations in Gaza, but noted that the US did "not have complete information to verify" whether the US-made weapons have been "were specifically used" in alleged violations of international humanitarian law.

== Reactions ==
A child survivor of the attack stated, "What did we do? There are no armed people in the school. There are children playing. We play together … Why did they bomb us?" Families stated they were not given any prior warning before the attack with one woman stating, "We went to evacuation centres run by the United Nations in order to afford ourselves some protection, but we have been attacked." In a statement, Oxfam stated, "Dozens of people – including children – were slaughtered while they slept".

Secretary General of the United Nations António Guterres condemned the attack, saying that UN premises must be inviolable. Martin Griffiths, the humanitarian aid coordinator for the United Nations, wrote, "The rules of war must be respected. Civilians must be protected." Philippe Lazzarini, the head of UNRWA, stated, "Attacking, targeting or using UN buildings for military purposes are a blatant disregard of International Humanitarian Law". The UN Human Rights Office stated Israel's failure to account for "distinction, proportionality and precaution" would amount to a violation of international humanitarian law and that even the presence of fighters would not have justified violations of the laws of war.

Spokesperson for the United States Department of State Matthew Miller called for Israel to show full "transparency" about the incident. Miller later stated the Israeli attack did not cross President Joe Biden's so-called "red line", or a large-scale operation in Rafah. The European Union's top diplomat Josep Borrell called for an independent investigation, stating, "Reports coming from Gaza time and again show that violence and suffering are still the only reality for hundreds of thousands of innocent civilians". Hadja Lahbib, the foreign minister of Belgium, called the attack "an appalling and unacceptable act of violence". The Foreign Ministry of Qatar called the attack a "horrific massacre" and "a brutal crime". Zarah Sultana, a British member of parliament, stated, "It is a disgrace that British-made weapons could be being used to commit crimes like this".

Director of the Gaza Government Media Office Ismail Al-Thawabta told reporters, "This terrible massacre that was carried out by the Israeli occupiers, a clear evidence of genocide is the ethnic cleansing against civilians, including women and children, and refugees in the Gaza Strip.

== See also ==
- Attacks on schools during the Israeli invasion of Gaza
- Israeli war crimes
