= Dan Goldfuss =

Israeli brigadier general (born 1976)

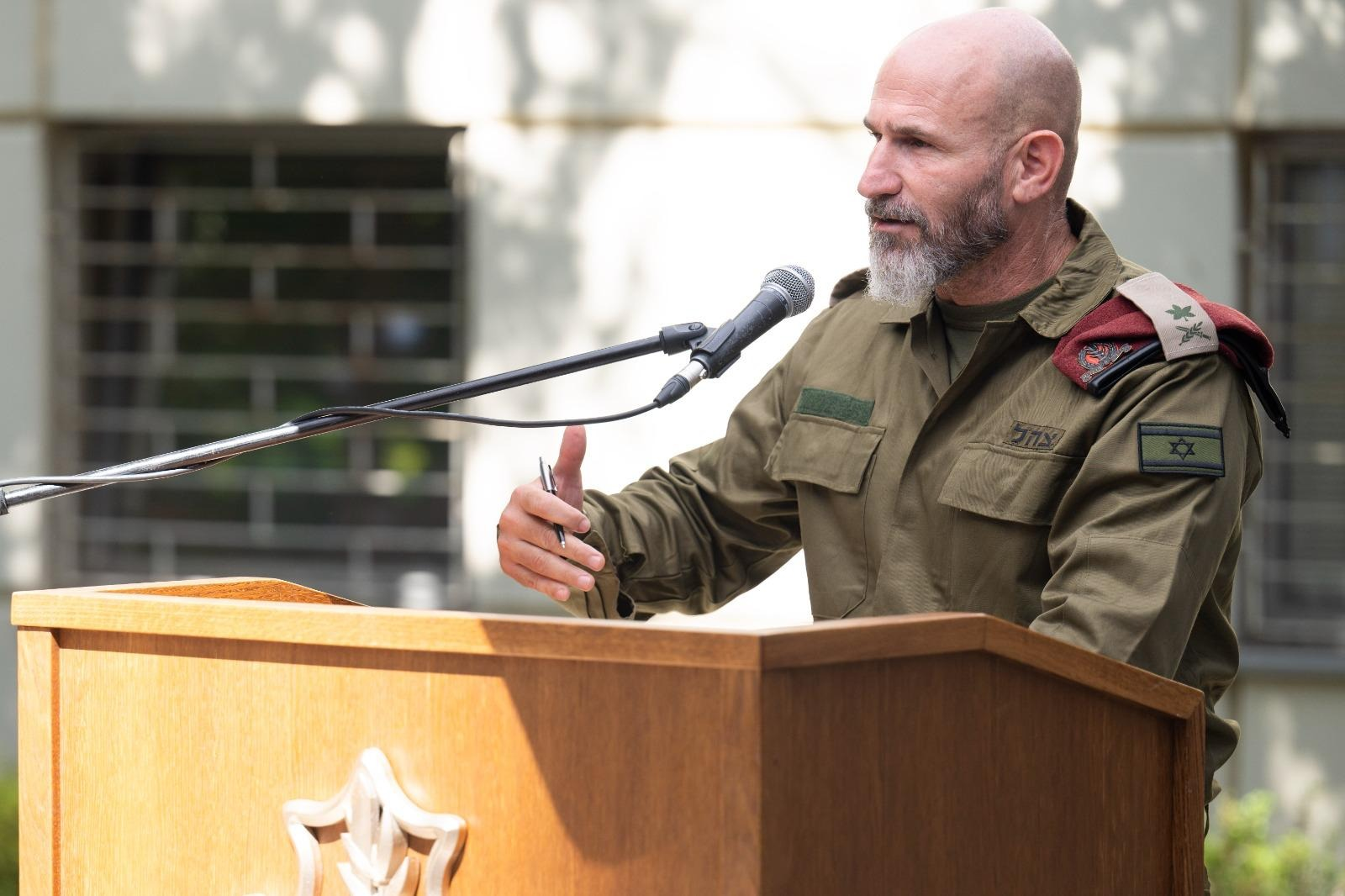
- Native name: דן גולדפוס
- Born: December 28, 1976 (age 49); Jerusalem, Israel
- Allegiance: Israel
- Branch: Israel Defense Forces
- Service years: 1995-present
- Rank: Major General
- Commands: Gadsar Nahal; Shayetet 13; 931st Onyx Battalion; 226st Reserve Paratroopers Battalion; Nahal Brigade; Infantry Corps; Fire Formation; Northern Corps; Maneuver Array
- Conflicts: Security Zone in Lebanon; First Intifada; Second Intifada; 2006 Lebanon War; Operation Summer Rains; Operation Cast Lead; Operation Pillar of Defense; Operation Protective Edge; Gaza war
- Awards: Aluf Citation

Dan Goldfuss (Hebrew: דן גולדפוס; born December 28, 1976) is an Israeli major general serving as the commander of the IDF Northern Corps and the Multi-Domain Joint Maneuver Array.

He previously served as Commander of Gadsar Nahal, Shayetet 13, 931st Onyx Battalion, Nahal Brigade, and The Fire Formation.

== Biography ==
Goldfuss was born and raised in Jerusalem. His parents were South African Jewish immigrants to Israel. He grew up religious but became more secular later in life. He enlisted in the IDF in March 1995, and volunteered for Shayetet 13. He completed the warrior course training in the Shayetet, and took part in the fighting in southern Lebanon, among other things he was part of the rescue force in the Ansariya ambush. After that he went to the infantry officers' course. At the end of the course he returned to Shayetet 13 and was appointed a platoon commander. He later served as the commander of a Shayetet 13 combat unit, among other things during Operation Defensive Shield. He was also involved in the interception of the Karine A arms ship during the Karine A affair. He then moved to the Nahal Brigade and was appointed commander of the Gadsar Nahal between 2002-2004, and led it in the fight against Palestinian terrorism in the Second Intifada. For the manner in which he commanded it, he was awarded the Aluf Citation by Moshe Kaplinsky.

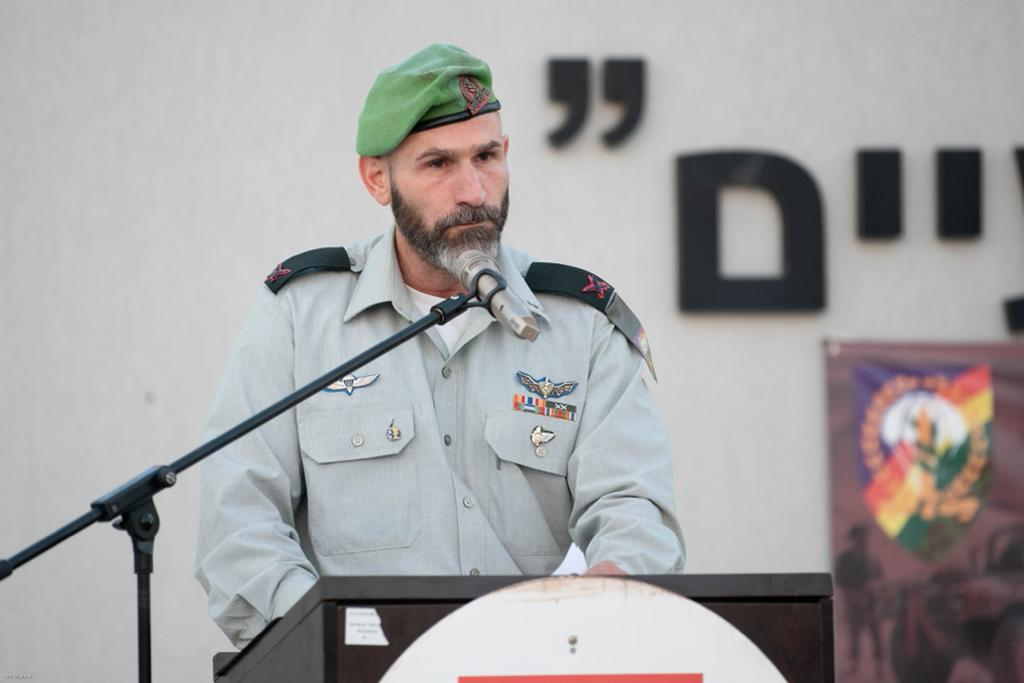

In 2007 he was promoted to the rank of lieutenant colonel (Sgan-Aluf) and appointed platoon commander in Shayetet 13, and led it, among other things, in Operation Cast Lead, he served in this position until 2009. Later he was appointed commander of the 931st Onyx Battalion between the years 2009-2011. In July 2015 he was appointed commander of the 226th reserve Paratroopers Battalion and at the same time commander of a course in the company commanders and battalion commanders course, and served in his positions until March 2017. On March 2, 2017 he was appointed commander of the Nahal Brigade, and served in this position until August 15, 2019. On September 16, 2019 he was promoted to the rank of brigadier general (Tat-Aluf) and was appointed head of Infantry Corps, a position in which he served until July 19, 2021. At the end of his position, he went to study at Harvard University in the United States. On September 21, 2022, he was appointed commander of the 98th Paratroopers Division, also known as the Ha-Esh or "Fire Formation".

During the ongoing Gaza war he has commanded the 98th Paratroopers Division in Khan Yunis in the southern Gaza Strip.

In a statement he gave in the Gaza Strip, in March 2024, Goldfuss called for Israel's leaders to be "worthy of the reservists who did not care what side they were from, and fought side by side".

On July 31, 2024 Goldfuss has finished his position as the commander of the 98th Paratroopers Division, was promoted to the rank of Major General (Aluf) and chosen as the commander of the Northern Corps which is only active during wartime.

== Awards and decorations ==
Dan Goldfuss was awarded three campaign ribbons for his service during three conflicts, as well as one Aluf Citation.

Aluf Citation	Second Lebanon War	South Lebanon Security Zone	Operation Protective Edge

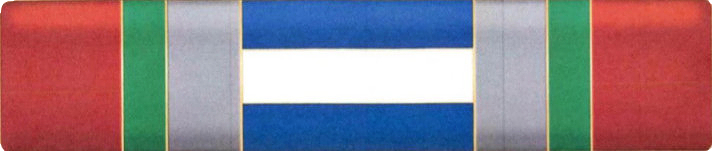

== Personal life ==
Goldfuss has a wife and four children. He has earned a bachelor's degree in politics, government and Middle Eastern studies from the Reichman University, and a master's degree in political science from the University of Haifa.
