= Bani Suheila =

Bani Suheila بني سهيلا
- Municipality type A (City)

Arabic transcription(s)
  - Arabic: بني سهيلا
- Municipal Logo of Bani Suheila

- Location of Bani Suheila within Palestine
- Coordinates: 31°20′34″N 34°19′31″E
- Palestine grid: 85/83
- State: State of Palestine
- Governorate: Khan Yunis

Government
  - Type: City
  - Control: Contested: Israel; Hamas
  - Head of Municipality: Shahab Al-Khalileh

Area
  - Total: 5,170 dunams (5.17 km^{2}; 2.00 sq mi)

Population (2017)
  - Total: 41,439
  - Density: 8,020/km^{2} (20,800/sq mi)
- Website: www.banisuhaila.org

Bani Suheila (Arabic: بني سهيلا) is a municipality in the Gaza Strip, in the Khan Yunis Governorate of the State of Palestine. The town is located 2 km (1.2 mi) east of the city of Khan Younis. As of 2017, Bani Suheila had a population of 41,439 people.

== History ==
The history of these towns goes back to Canaanite, Philistine, and Roman times. Before 1948, these towns boasted numerous khans (inns) for travelers. Khan Yunis owes its name to a Mamluk official who built its large khan in the 14th century.

For centuries, the coastal area was a main thoroughfare between Egypt and the Mediterranean coast, used by traders and conquering armies alike. The trade route through Gaza to Egypt brought great economic advantage to the area. In previous centuries, the lack of restricting borders enabled unobstructed communication and travel and the intermixing of influences and styles, especially among the Bedouin tribes. This rich agricultural area prospered by settled Bedouin tribes that became active in regional trade on routes connecting Egypt, the Levant, and Arabia. Many families benefited from the increase in regional trade and became large land owners during this time. During Ottoman rule, the Al Qarra clan became the largest landowning family in southern Gaza due to their vast trade networks.

Bani Suheila was marked Maatadieh Village on Jacotin’s map surveyed during Napoleon's 1799 invasion.

In 1838, Edward Robinson called it Beni Sehileh, located in Gaza. In 1863, the French explorer Victor Guérin found Bani Suheila to have about 1,300 inhabitants, while an official Ottoman village list of about 1870 showed 209 houses and a population of 440, though the population count included men, only.

As recorded in 1886, Bani Suheila was a large village containing 120 huts, partly built of stone, partly of adobe, and surrounded by gardens of watermelons, figs, palms, jummez, apricots and legumes. In the north a good but deep well, worked by a camel, supplied drinking water. Near the town, in Sheikh Yusuf several ancient remains, including small twisted marble columns and building stones were found.

=== British era ===
In the 1922 census of Palestine conducted by the British Mandate authorities, Bani Suheila had a population of 1,043 inhabitants, all Muslim, increasing in the 1931 census to 2,063, still all Muslims, in 406 houses.

At the end of the Mandate period, in the 1945 statistics, Bani Suheila had a population of 3,220, all Muslims, with 11,128 dunams of land, according to an official land and population survey. Of this, 54 dunams were for plantations and irrigable land, 10,639 used for cereals, while 97 dunams were built-up land.

=== Post 1948 ===
During the night of August 31, 1955, Israeli armed forces attacked Bani Suheila. On April 5, 1956, Israeli artillery shelled the town.

According to the Palestinian Central Bureau of Statistics the population of Bani Suheila had grown to 32,800 people in mid-year 2006. During the Gaza war in December 2023, the IDF took full control of the city.

== Demography ==
Some of its residents are from the Arab Jaram clan, formerly residing in Majdal Yaba and Attil, while others trace their origins to Egypt.

== Bibliography ==
- Barron, J.B., ed. (1923). Palestine: Report and General Abstracts of the Census of 1922. Government of Palestine.
- Department of Statistics (1945). Village Statistics, April, 1945. Government of Palestine.
- Guérin, V. (1869). Description Géographique Historique et Archéologique de la Palestine (in French). Vol. 1: Judee, pt. 2. Paris: L'Imprimerie Nationale.
- Hadawi, S. (1970). Village Statistics of 1945: A Classification of Land and Area ownership in Palestine. Palestine Liberation Organization Research Centre.
- Hartmann, M. (1883). "Die Ortschaftenliste des Liwa Jerusalem in dem türkischen Staatskalender für Syrien auf das Jahr 1288 der Flucht (1871)". Zeitschrift des Deutschen Palästina-Vereins. 6: 102–149.
- Karmon, Y. (1960). "An Analysis of Jacotin's Map of Palestine" (PDF). Israel Exploration Journal. 10 (3, 4): 155–173, 244–253. Archived from the original (PDF) on 2019-12-22.
- Mills, E., ed. (1932). Census of Palestine 1931. Population of Villages, Towns and Administrative Areas. Jerusalem: Government of Palestine.
- Morris, B. (1993). Israel's Border Wars, 1949-1956: Arab Infiltration, Israeli Retaliation, and the Countdown to the Suez War. Oxford University Press. ISBN 0-19-829262-7.
- Robinson, E.; Smith, E. (1841). Biblical Researches in Palestine, Mount Sinai and Arabia Petraea: A Journal of Travels in the year 1838. Vol. 3. Boston: Crocker & Brewster.
- Schumacher, G. (1886). "Researches in Southern Palestine". Quarterly Statement - Palestine Exploration Fund. 18: 171–194.
- Socin, A. (1879). "Alphabetisches Verzeichniss von Ortschaften des Paschalik Jerusalem". Zeitschrift des Deutschen Palästina-Vereins. 2: 135–163.
