= Outline of the Gaza war =

The following outline is provided as an overview of and topical guide to the Wikipedia articles available about the Gaza war. It is an evolving list.

== Top level articles ==
- 1988 Hamas charter
- Israeli disengagement from the Gaza Strip
- October 7 attacks
- List of Gaza war hostages
- Casualties of the Gaza war
- Diplomatic impact of the Gaza war
  - Defense for Children International – Palestine et al v. Biden et al
- Allegations of genocide in the October 7 attacks
- Gaza genocide
  - Academic and legal responses to the Gaza genocide
  - Cultural discourse about the Gaza genocide
  - Gaza genocide denial
  - Intent and incitement in the Gaza genocide
- Impacts of the Gaza war
  - Economic impact of the Gaza war
- Israeli blockade of the Gaza Strip (2023–present)
- Israel–Hezbollah conflict (2023–present)
- Israeli incursions in the West Bank during the Gaza war
- Israeli invasion of the Gaza Strip
- Israeli invasion of Syria (2024–present)
- Gaza war hostage crisis
- Hostages and Missing Families Forum
  - Tikva Forum
  - Tsav 9
- Mass detentions in the Gaza war
- Sexual and gender-based violence in the October 7 attacks
- Pallywood
- Red Sea crisis
- Sexual and gender-based violence against Palestinians during the Gaza war
  - Sde Teiman gang rape
- Timeline of the Gaza Strip healthcare collapse
- Timeline of the Gaza war
- War crimes in the Gaza war
  - South Africa's genocide case against Israel
  - International Criminal Court arrest warrants for Israeli leaders
  - Israeli war crimes in the Gaza war
  - Torture during the Gaza war

== Background articles ==
=== General ===
- Antisemitism
  - Antisemitism in the Arab world
  - Weaponization of antisemitism
- Arab–Israeli conflict
  - Gaza–Israel conflict
  - Israeli–Palestinian conflict
    - Palestinian political violence
    - Palestinian rocket attacks on Israel
- Axis of Resistance
  - Hezbollah
- Background to the Gaza war
- Gaza Strip
  - Israeli occupation of the Gaza Strip
  - Gaza Strip under Hamas
  - Blockade of the Gaza Strip
- Hamas
- 1988 Hamas charter
- 2017 Hamas charter
  - Israeli support for Hamas
- Iran–Israel proxy conflict
  - Hezbollah–Israel conflict
- Israel
  - History of Israel
    - Timeline of Israeli history
    - History of Israel (1948–present)
      - Thirty-seventh government of Israel
  - Censorship in Israel
  - Conscription in Israel
  - Legitimacy of the State of Israel
- Israeli-occupied territories
- Middle Eastern crisis (2023–present)
- Palestinian right of armed resistance
- Palestinian refugees
- Wikipedia and the Israeli–Palestinian conflict
- Zionism
  - Jewish terrorism
  - Zionism as settler colonialism
  - Zionist political violence

=== Preceding conflicts ===
- First Intifada
- Second Intifada
- 2014 Gaza War
- 2023 Neve Yaakov shooting
- 2023 Al-Aqsa clashes
- 2023 Israel–Lebanon shellings
- July 2023 Jenin incursion
- May 2023 Gaza–Israel clashes

=== Peace talks and reforms ===
- Israeli disengagement from the Gaza Strip
- 2023 Israeli judicial reform protests
- Israeli–Palestinian peace process
- Israel–Saudi Arabia relations § Potential normalization

=== Gaza Strip and the West Bank ===
- Egypt Gaza barrier
- Blockade of the Gaza Strip
- Israeli permit regime in the Gaza Strip
- Palestinians workers in israel
  - Gaza Strip smuggling tunnels
- Israeli occupation of the West Bank
  - Israeli permit regime in the West Bank
  - Israeli apartheid
  - Palestinian freedom of movement
- Israeli settlement
  - Gaza envelope
  - Gush Emunim
    - Amana (organization)
  - Hilltop Youth
  - Legality of Israeli settlements
  - Israeli demolition of Palestinian property
  - Israeli outpost
  - Israeli settlement timeline
  - No Other Land
  - Coordinator of Government Activities in the Territories (COGAT)

== Events ==
=== General ===
- 2026 West Bank lockdown
- Attacks on US bases during the Gaza war
- April 2024 Iranian strikes on Israel
- AI-assisted targeting in the Gaza Strip
- Alleged implementation of Hannibal Directive during the 7 October attacks
- Dahiya doctrine
- Deir al-Balah aid worker impersonation incident
- Executions and assassinations during the Gaza war
  - Killing of Alon Shamriz, Yotam Haim, and Samer Talalka
- Gaza Strip evacuations
- Israeli blockade of the Gaza Strip (2023–present)
- Israeli invasion of Syria (2024–present)
- Israel–Hezbollah conflict (2023–present)
- Israeli generals' plan
- Kerem Shalom aid convoy looting
- Killing of health workers in the Gaza war
- Killing of journalists in the Gaza war
  - Samer Abu Daqqa
- List of military engagements during the Gaza war
- Options for a policy regarding Gaza's civilian population
- Timeline of the Israeli–Palestinian conflict in 2023
- Timeline of the Israeli–Palestinian conflict in 2024
- Timeline of the Israeli–Palestinian conflict in 2025
- Timeline of the Israeli–Palestinian conflict in 2026

=== October 7, 2023 ===
- Alumim massacre
- Battle of Nir Am
- Battle of Ofakim
- Battle of Re'im
- Battle of Sderot
- Battle of Sufa
- Be'eri massacre
- Holit attack
- Kfar Aza massacre
- Kissufim Massacre
- Nahal Oz attack
- Netiv HaAsara massacre
- Nir Oz attack
- Nir Yitzhak attack
- Nirim attack
- Nova music festival massacre
- Psyduck music festival massacre
- Zikim attack

=== Battles and attacks ===
- 2023 Givat Shaul shooting
  - Killing of Yuval Kestelman
- 2024 Israeli military operation in the West Bank
- 2024 Jaffa shooting
- 2024 Lebanon electronic device attacks
- 2024 Rafah hostage raid
- 2025 Gaza Strip aid distribution killings
- 2025 Gaza City offensive
- 2025 Israeli military operation in the West Bank
- 2025 Ramot Junction shooting
- Al-Farabi School Bombing
- Al-Sardi school attack
- Attack on Nabatieh municipal council
- Attacks on health facilities during the Gaza war
  - Al-Ahli Arab Hospital explosion
  - Al-Shifa Hospital siege
  - Nasser Hospital siege
    - Nasser Hospital mass graves
- August 2024 Deir al-Balah attacks
- August 2024 Nabatieh attack
- Battle of Beit Hanoun
- December 2024 Nuseirat refugee camp attack
- Hamama School bombing
- Israeli attack on Ramyah UNIFIL post
- Israeli incursions in the West Bank during the Gaza war
  - Israeli incursions in Tulkarm
  - Israeli settler violence
  - Killing of Ayşenur Eygi
  - Killing of Benjamin Achimeir
  - Killing of members of the Bani Odeh family
  - Killing of Tawfic Abdel Jabbar
  - Killing of David Ben Avraham
  - Price tag attack policy
    - List of Israeli price tag attacks
- Israeli invasion of the Gaza Strip
  - Israa University (Palestine).
  - 2024 Rafah hostage raid
- January 2025 southern Lebanon attack
- July 2024 al-Shati refugee camp attack
- July 2026 West Bank unrest
- June 2024 Al-Mawasi refugee camp attack
- Majdal Shams attack
- May 2024 Al-Mawasi refugee camp attack
- May 2025 Gaza offensive
  - Battle of Khan Yunis
  - Deir al-Balah offensive
- March 2025 Israeli attacks on the Gaza Strip
- November 2024 Batroun raid
- October 2024 Abu Hussein school attack
- Rafah offensive
  - Background of the Rafah offensive
- Siege of Gaza City
  - Insurgency in the northern Gaza Strip
- Siege of Khan Yunis
  - July 2024 Khan Yunis incursion
  - August 2024 Khan Yunis incursion
- September 2024 Al-Jawni School attack
- September 2024 Al-Mawasi refugee camp attack

=== Airstrikes ===
- 12 February 2024 Rafah strikes
- 22 July 2024 Khan Yunis attack
- 2023 Zorob family airstrike
- 2024 Basta airstrikes
- 2024 Beirut medical center airstrike
- 2024 Beqaa Valley airstrikes
- 2024 Derdghaya Melkite Church airstrike
- 2024 drone attack on Benjamin Netanyahu's residence
- 2024 Hezbollah drone strike on Binyamina
- 2024 Sahel Alma airstrike
- 2024 Tulkarm Camp airstrike
- 2025 Gaza European Hospital strikes
- 2025 Nasser Hospital strikes
- 2025 Sidon airstrike
- 2025 Wehda Street airstrikes
- Al-Baqa Cafe airstrike
- April 2025 Shuja'iyya airstrike
- April 2024 Iranian strikes against Israel
- Assassination of Anas Al-Sharif
- Assassination of Ismail Haniyeh
- Assassination of Saleh al-Arouri
- Attacks on Palestinians evacuating Gaza City
- Attacks on refugee camps in the Gaza war
  - Israeli attacks on Al-Maghazi refugee camp
  - Al-Shati refugee camp airstrikes
  - Attacks on Jabalia refugee camp (2023–present)
    - 31 October 2023 Jabalia refugee camp airstrike
    - Al-Fakhoora school airstrikes
  - Tel al-Sultan attack
- Attacks on schools during the Israeli invasion of Gaza
  - Al-Fakhoora school airstrikes
- Church of Saint Porphyrius airstrike
- Engineer's Building airstrike
- Israeli airstrike on the Iranian consulate in Damascus
- Israeli airstrikes on municipal services in the Gaza Strip
- Israeli attack on Doha
- Israeli bombing of the Gaza Strip
- Khadija School airstrike
- List of Palestinian rocket attacks on Israel in 2023
- Musa family airstrike
- November 2025 Israeli attack in Beirut
- October 2024 Aitou airstrike
- October 2024 Bachoura airstrike
- October 2024 Iranian strikes against Israel
- October 2024 Deir al-Balah mosque bombing
- Salem family airstrikes (December 19, 2023)
- Shehada family strike
- World Central Kitchen aid convoy attack

=== Massacres ===
- Fahmi al-Jarjawi School attack
- Flour Massacre
- Kuwait Roundabout mass killings
- Netiv HaAsara massacre
- Rafah aid distribution killings
- Rafah paramedic massacre

== Locations ==
- Gaza–Israel barrier
  - Kerem Shalom border crossing
  - Rafah Border Crossing
- Gaza Strip
- Egypt Gaza barrier
- Israel
  - Southern District
- Iraq
- Lebanon
- Syria
  - Golan Heights
- Red Sea
- West Bank
  - Palestinian enclaves
  - Area C

== Effects ==
- 2024 Gaza Strip polio epidemic
- January 2025 Gaza war ceasefire
- Donald Trump's February 2025 Gaza Strip proposal
- Gaza peace plan
- Effect of the Gaza war on children in the Gaza Strip
  - Children in the Israeli–Palestinian conflict
- Gaza humanitarian crisis (2023–present)
  - 2023–2024 Gaza Strip preterm births
  - Gaza Strip famine
  - Israeli blockade of aid delivery to the Gaza Strip
  - Timeline of the Gaza Strip healthcare collapse
- Israeli public diplomacy in the Gaza war
  - Do you condemn Hamas?
- ICJ case on Israel's occupation of the Palestinian territories
- List of sanctions involving Israel
  - Arms embargoes on Israel since 2023
- Nova Festival Victims Memorial
- Proposed Israeli resettlement of the Gaza Strip
  - Nachala (organisation)
- Societal breakdown in the Gaza Strip during the Gaza war
- The Car Wall
- University donors during the Gaza war
- United Nations General Assembly Resolution ES-10/21
- United Nations Security Council Resolution 2712
- United Nations General Assembly Resolution ES-10/22
- United Nations Security Council Resolution 2720
- United Nations Security Council Resolution 2728
- United Nations Security Council Resolution 2735
- UN watch
- Winter of 2024–25 in the Gaza Strip
- Women in the Gaza war

== Protests ==
- Globalize the Intifada
- 2024 pro-Palestinian protests on university campuses
  - 2024 pro-Palestinian protests on university campuses in the Netherlands
  - 2024 Sciences Po pro-Palestinian occupation protest
- 2024 pro-Palestinian Tax Day protests
- 2025 pro-Israel mob attack in Brooklyn
- 2025 pro-Palestinian protests on university campuses in the Netherlands
- Adelaide Writers' Week boycott
- Bendigo Writers Festival boycott
- Gaza war protests
  - From the river to the sea
  - Gaza war protests in Australia
  - Gaza war protests in Israel
    - September 2024 Israel hostage deal protests
    - Israeli hostage deal protests
  - Gaza war protests in New Zealand
  - Gaza war protests in the United Kingdom
    - 2025 Prisoners for Palestine hunger strike
  - Gaza war protests in the United States
    - Columbia University pro-Palestinian campus occupations during the Gaza war
    - 2024 University of California, Los Angeles pro-Palestinian campus occupation
    - List of pro-Palestinian protests on university campuses in the United States in 2024
    - Artists4Ceasefire
    - Detention of Mahmoud Khalil
    - Detention of Mohsen Mahdawi
    - Detention of Rümeysa Öztürk
    - Gaza war protest vote movements
    - March for Israel
    - March on Washington for Gaza
    - National March on Washington: Free Palestine
    - Self-immolation of Aaron Bushnell
    - Uncommitted National Movement
  - Gaza war protest vote movements
  - Lists of pro-Palestinian protests
  - September 2025 Italian general strike for Gaza
  - Doctors Against Genocide
  - No Music For Genocide
- Holocaust memory in pro-Palestinian activism
- LGBTQ advocacy in the Gaza war

== Issues ==
- 2023 Israeli–Palestinian prisoner exchange
- 2023 Gaza war ceasefire
- 2024 Israeli secret document leak scandal
- January 2025 Gaza war ceasefire
- Anti-Palestinian racism during the Gaza war
- Antisemitism during the Gaza war
- Censorship of pro-Palestinian expression in the cultural sector of Germany
- Comparisons between Israel and Nazi Germany
- Confessions of detained Palestinians in the Gaza war
- Denial of the October 7 attacks
- Destruction of cultural heritage during the Gaza war
- Environmental impact of the Gaza war
- Gaza Strip mass graves
- Pallywood
- International reactions to the Gaza war
- Islamophobia during the Gaza war
- Israeli razing of cemeteries and necroviolence against Palestinians
- Hamas baby beheading hoax
- Humanitarian aid during the Gaza war
  - Gaza floating pier
  - Gaza Humanitarian Foundation
- Misinformation in the Gaza war
- Palestinian sports during the Israeli invasion of the Gaza Strip
- Propaganda and psychological warfare in the Gaza Wars
- UNRWA and Israel
- Use of human shields by Hamas
- Use of human shields by Israeli forces
  - Hannibal Directive
- Violent incidents in reaction to the Gaza war
  - 2023 shooting of Palestinian students in Burlington, Vermont
  - 2025 Boulder fire attack
  - Death of Paul Kessler
  - Feather River School shooting
  - Murder of Wadea al-Fayoume
  - 2025 killing of Israeli Embassy workers in Washington, D.C.

== Depiction in media ==
- A Letter to David
- Bearing Witness
- From Ground Zero
- Gaza: Doctors Under Attack
- Gaza: How to Survive a Warzone
- Harbu Darbu
- Hind's Hall
  - Hind's Hall 2
- Holding Liat
- Hurricane
- Israelism
- Kidnapped from Israel
- Media coverage of the Gaza war
- Louis Theroux: The Settlers
- No Other Land
- October 8
- One Day in October
- Put Your Soul on Your Hand and Walk
- Rajieen
- Red Alert
- Screams Before Silence
- Stay Forte
- The Children of October 7
- The Encampments
- The Road Between Us: The Ultimate Rescue
- The Voice of Hind Rajab
- We Will Dance Again
- Yes

== International ==
- 2020 Trump Israel–Palestine plan
- 2024 Gaza freedom flotilla
- 2024 leak of U.S. intelligence on Israeli strike plans
- 2025 Gaza peace summit
- January 2025 Gaza war ceasefire
- May 2025 Gaza Freedom Flotilla incident
- June 2025 Gaza Freedom Flotilla
- July 2025 Gaza Freedom Flotilla
- Calls for a ceasefire during the Gaza war
- Diplomatic impact of the Gaza war
  - German support for Israel in the Gaza war
  - United States support for Israel in the Gaza war
- Gaza war peace plan
- Evacuations during the Gaza war
- Hind Rajab Foundation
- International reactions to the Gaza war
- International recognition of Palestine
- Gaza war protests
- Global March to Gaza
- Global Sumud Flotilla
  - List of participants of the Global Sumud Flotilla
- Kidnapped from Israel
- Manchester synagogue attack
- Red Sea crisis
  - Houthi attacks on commercial vessels
- Soumoud Convoy
- The Gaza Tribunal
- Violent incidents in reaction to the Gaza war
  - 2023 antisemitic riots in the North Caucasus
  - 2023 shooting of Palestinian students in Burlington, Vermont
  - 2025 Boulder fire attack
  - 2025 Capital Jewish Museum shooting
  - 2025 pro-Israel mob attack in Brooklyn
  - 2025 Pennsylvania Governor's Residence arson attack
  - Death of Paul Kessler
  - Murder of Wadea al-Fayoume
  - November 2024 Amsterdam riots
  - Self-immolation of Aaron Bushnell

== Lists ==
- International reactions to the Gaza war § Visits by world leaders
- List of entire families killed in the Gaza war
- List of civilians killed in the Gaza war
- Gaza genocide recognition
- List of humanitarian and human rights groups accusing Israel of genocide in Gaza
- List of Gaza war hostages
- List of journalists killed in the Gaza war
- List of military aid to Israel during the Gaza war
- List of military engagements during the Gaza war
- List of massacres in Israel
- List of massacres in Palestine

== Forces ==
- Gaza war order of battle

=== Israel ===
- Israel Defense Forces
- Israel Police
- Mossad
- Shin Bet
- The Israeli Reservists - Generation of Victory

=== Palestine ===
- Palestinian Joint Operations Room
  - Democratic Front for the Liberation of Palestine
    - National Resistance Brigades
  - Hamas
    - Al-Qassam Brigades
    - Nukhba forces
  - Palestinian Islamic Jihad
    - Al-Quds Brigades
  - Popular Front for the Liberation of Palestine
    - Abu Ali Mustafa Brigades
- Popular Forces
- Popular Army – Northern Forces
- Counter-Terrorism Strike Force
- Shuja'iyya Popular Defense Forces

=== International ===
- USS Gerald R. Ford

== Individuals ==
- Category:People killed in the Gaza war

=== Anti-Hamas Palestinian groups ===
- Ghassan Duhine
- Yasser Abu Shabab

=== Hamas and supporting groups ===
- Abdul Fatah Dukhan
- Ahmed Ghandour (militant)
- Alaa Shreiteh
- Ali Al Qadi
- Ayman Nofal
- Fatah Sharif
- Ihab al-Ghussein
- Ismail Haniyeh
- Issam al-Da'alis
- Jamila Abdallah Taha al-Shanti
- Marwan Issa
- Mohammed Dababish
- Mohammed Deif
- Mohammed Sinwar
- Muhammad Shabana
- Osama Mazini
- Rafa Salama
- Rawhi Mushtaha
- Saleh al-Arouri
- Talal Abu Zarifa
- Wissam Farhat
- Yahya Sinwar

=== International ===
- Joe Biden
- Donald Trump
- Anthony Aguilar
- Antony Blinken
- Abdul-Malik al-Houthi
- Ayşenur Eygi
- Douglas Murray (author)
- Francesca Albanese
- Greta Thunberg
- Hashem Safieddine
- Hassan Nasrallah
- Liam Cunningham
- Lily Greenberg Call
- Lizzy Savetsky
- Ms. Rachel
- Rima Hassan
- Shabbos Kestenbaum
- Bipin Joshi
- Nattapong Pinta
- Mahmoud Khalil
- Mohsen Mahdawi

=== Israeli ===
- Beni Aharon
- Liri Albag
- Edan Alexander
- Nimrod Aloni
- Matan Angrest
- Noa Argamani
- Itamar Ben-Gvir
- Gali Berman
- Ziv Berman
- Ariel Bibas
- Kfir Bibas
- Shiri Bibas
- Yarden Bibas
- Elkana Bohbot
- Rom Braslavski
- Nimrod Cohen
- Ariel Cunio
- David Cunio
- Emily Damari
- Alex Dancyg
- Evyatar David
- Rachel Edry
- Carmel Gat
- Hersh Goldberg-Polin
- Rachel Goldberg-Polin
- Romi Gonen
- Ran Gvili
- Salman Habaka
- Asaf Hamami
- Shoshan Haran
- Gal Hirsch
- Avigail Idan
- Hayim Katsman
- Hanna Katzir
- Bar Kupershtein
- Naama Levy
- Oded Lifshitz
- Shani Louk
- Noa Marciano
- Ori Megidish
- Eitan Mor
- Gadi Moses
- Benjamin Netanyahu
- Omer Neutra
- Yosef Ohana
- Alon Ohel
- Avinatan Or
- Chaim Peri
- Inbal Rabin-Lieberman
- Yarden Roman-Gat
- Mia Schem
- Raz Segal
- Aner Shapira
- Eli Sharabi
- Omer Shem Tov
- Vivian Silver
- Bezalel Smotrich
- Amit Soussana
- Amir Tibon
- Daniella Weiss
- Arbel Yehoud
- Einav Zangauker

=== Palestinian and Gazans ===
- Batool Abu Akleen
- Ismail Abu Hatab
- Hussam Abu Safiya
- Nagham Abu Samra
- Ghassan Abu-Sittah
- Mosab Abu Toha
- Hussam Al-Adlouni
- Refaat Alareer
- Plestia Alaqad
- Adnan al-Bursh
- Wael Al-Dahdouh
- Mohamed al-Dalou
- Shaban al-Dalou
- Ismail al-Ghoul
- Saleh al-Jafarawi
- Yazan al-Kafarneh
- Mahasen al-Khateeb
- Hammam Alloh
- Alaa Al Najjar
- al-Najjar children
- Anas Al-Sharif
- Wafa Al-Udaini
- Naheda Anton
- Samar Anton
- Hassan Aslih
- Motaz Azaiza
- David Ben Avraham
- Mohammad Bhar
- Mariam Dagga
- Medo Halimy
- Fatima Hassouna
- Sidra Hassouna
- Awdah Hathaleen
- Belal Jadallah
- Khalida Jarrar
- Mohammad Khdour
- Hind Khoudary
- Sayfollah Musallet
- Suleiman Obeid
- Bisan Owda
- Hind Rajab
- Hossam Shabat
- Hamada Shaqoura
- Omar Abu Shawish
- Yahya Sobeih
- Younis Tirawi
- Mohammed Zaher Ibrahim

== See also ==
- 1948 Arab–Israeli War
- Six-Day War
- Yom Kippur War
