= The Reservists =

The Reservists may refer to:

- The Reservists (organization) – an Israeli social movement and organization
- The Reservists (political party) – an Israeli political party founded by Yoaz Hendel
