= Battle of Ofakim =

2023 battle of the Israel–Hamas war

Battle of Ofakim קרב אופקים معركة سديروت
- Part of the Gaza war
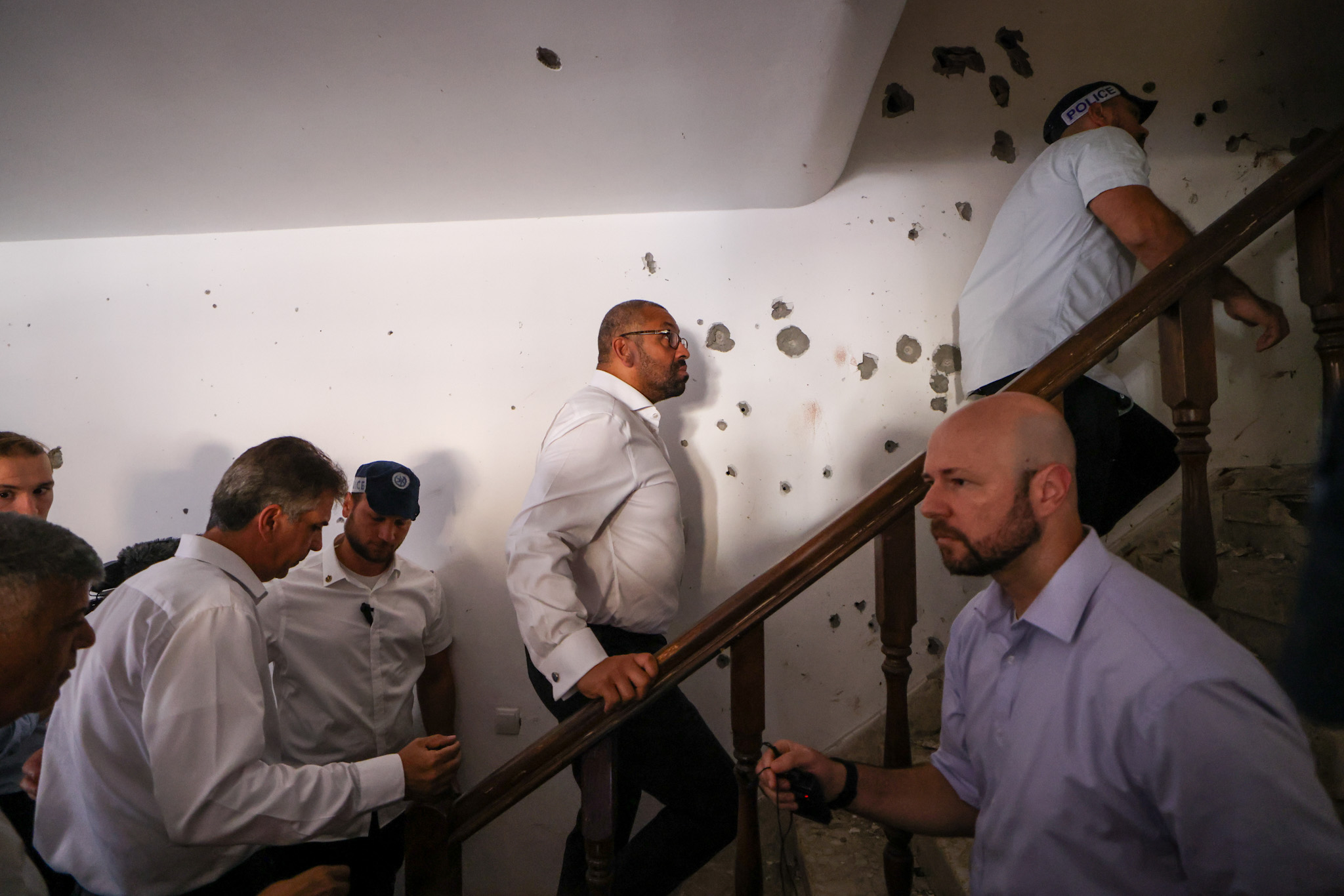
- Eli Cohen, Israeli Minister of Foreign Affairs, visits Rachel Edry's residence
Date	7–9 October 2023 (2 days)
Location	Ofakim, Southern District, Israel
Result	Israeli victory

Belligerents
Hamas	Israel

Commanders and leaders
	Nivi Ohana

Units involved
(Hamas) Al-Qassam Brigades	Israel Defense Forces; Israel Police; Israeli armed "volunteer security teams"

Casualties and losses
22 fighters killed	6 policemen killed (Israel) 27 civilians killed

The battle of Ofakim (Hebrew: קרב אופקים; Arabic: معركة سديروت) began on 7 October 2023, when Hamas launched a large-scale surprise attack on southern Israel, which was widely condemned as an act of terrorism. The Israeli city of Ofakim (Hebrew: אופקים) is a city in the Southern District of Israel, 20 kilometers (12.4 mi) west of Beersheba.

During the battle in the city, 27 residents and 6 policemen (Israel Police) were killed, in addition to other city residents who were murdered in other places in the Gaza Envelope. In total, 47 residents were killed in the attack—some during the battle and others in various locations in the Negev, and some were injured. The militants from Hamas and other groups used assault rifles, rocket-propelled grenades (RPG) and grenades. A total of 22 militants were killed by the Israel Defense Forces and Israel Police.

== Battle ==
=== Ground infiltration ===
At around 6:45 in the morning, militants arrived in Ofakim. Twenty-two entered the city in two vehicles loaded with guns, hand grenades, RPG rockets, plastic explosive charges, and mines. The militants were also equipped with medical kits, instructions for slinging an injured limb, maps of Ofakim, and rations. They entered through the western entrance to the city and went to the Mishor HaGafen neighborhood and seemed to pause, apparently waiting for sirens warning of incoming rocket attacks from Gaza to draw people outdoors on their way to bomb shelters. Numerous people were shot while approaching shelters. The Mishor HaGafen neighborhood, located on the westernmost edge of the city near the Merhavim Regional Council, has mostly older houses without built-in air raid shelters ("מקלט"). As a result, many of the victims were caught while either heading to or returning from public bomb shelters. On Goren Street, the terrorists murdered several people who were hiding inside a building, as well as individuals on the street. They then moved to Ha'Karim Street, where they killed more people, including an ambulance driver and a father and son. Afterward, the militants focused on Tamar Street, where they started killing anyone they encountered on the street or in cars. They later went through several houses, attempting to break in, throwing hand grenades at civilians and homes, and launching RPG rockets at two houses. One man, Victor Rachmilov, and his daughter sped away from the scene in an SUV while under fire, but after the car was riddled with bullets and Rachmilov was hit in the legs, the pair fled from the car under fire, with Rachmilov being hit four more times in the legs. However, they managed to escape.

Ofakim Mayor Itzik Danino immediately called Israeli Defense Minister Yoav Gallant, requesting the deployment of military forces to the city, but reinforcements were slow to arrive. The fighting was initially handled by police officers, off-duty IDF soldiers, and civilians armed with personal weapons. Some residents joined the fight with knives, not understanding the seriousness of the threat. Among the residents who participated was Knesset member and former police officer Almog Cohen. Police officer Dor Elmakias, who had been posted to the Nova music festival, soon to be targeted in the Re'im music festival massacre, rushed to Ofakim after receiving reports of gunfire there and joined the fighting. He was lightly injured but continued to fight, recalling "At the beginning, we didn’t know how many there were. They threw grenades and fired RPGs at us during the battle" and that he "saw people murdered in front of our eyes, in the streets…people murdered, in front of their family’s eyes, while we were under fire." Due to a shortage of weapons and ammunition, the city's defenders used weapons taken from the bodies of Hamas militants.

Police officers who responded were mostly armed only with handguns and found themselves battling militants with superior firepower. Upon arriving at the scene, police officer Itamar Alus spotted three militants and fired two shots at them, hitting one in the leg. After they sprayed automatic fire in his direction, he retreated. As he moved through the neighborhood, he climbed on a garden wall and killed a Hamas militant with several shots to the head. At the house next door, another police officer killed a militant trying to enter the house through the back door.

One police officer, detective Roni Abuharon, realizing that the militants were targeting a neighborhood where the apartment buildings lacked shelters, shouted at residents to get inside their houses as anyone running outside to shelters would be targeted. He was killed during the fighting and his body would be found by his brother Rafi.

During the fighting, gunfire around the home of Michal Bilia, who had gathered her sons and grandchildren for Shabbat, caused the family to scramble upstairs and exit through a window to take shelter beneath solar panels. One of her sons, Ariel Bilya, who was on call with his father-in-law Yehuda Cardenas, was killed by gunfire from a militant in the yard as he attempted to climb out the window after saving his wife Shoshana Cardenas Bilya, their two children and other family members. Police cleared the area, killing three militants who had taken cover in a nearby shed. Two were killed by grenades and the third was shot dead as he tried to surrender as the officers believed he had a bomb.

Upon hearing gunshots and seeing militants, Israel Chana, an Ofakim resident who worked as a private security guard at a bank who had been walking with his girlfriend, rushed home and retrieved his personal weapon to join the fighting. He was later spotted battling a squad of militants by himself, killing one and seriously wounding another. Chana was killed during the fighting. His actions were credited with preventing the militants from entering nearby homes.

In one instance, militants attempted to break into a public shelter where numerous residents had taken refuge. As they approached the shelter one was shot dead by an armed resident. The militants shot at four residents trying to reach the shelter, who had to run through a hail of bullets. The residents barricaded themselves inside the shelter, with one blocking the door by jamming a broken bicycle onto the door handle. The residents reported hearing banging on the door and shouts of "Jew, Jew, open the door" in Arabic before the militants gave up and moved on, apparently to the Edry's house which was nearby.

=== Stand-off at the Edry home ===
A prominent episode of the battle occurred at the home of Rachel and David Edry. Five militants broke into the house, holding the couple hostage. As three police officers and a soldier passed the house, they were targeted by gunfire from the house's second-floor window, killing police officer Yigal Iluz. His compatriots fell back under fire and police could not recover his body until reinforcements arrived. The house was surrounded by police and a stand-off ensued. One of the police officers participating in the stand-off was the Edry's son Evyatar. The police attempted to negotiate with the militants and occasionally exchanged fire with them. Rachel Edry attempted to charm the militants, conversing with them and offering them food and drinks. She managed to signal to the police outside that there were five militants. The stand-off ended when operators of the elite Yamam police tactical unit stormed the house, killing all five militants and rescuing the couple alive.

=== Regaining control over Ofakim ===
The confrontation in the city had centered mainly around Goren Street and its surroundings, where about 14 militants were involved. The militants were successfully prevented from advancing to other residential neighborhoods and from occupying the police station in Ofakim. By around 10 a.m., most of the militants had been killed. IDF reinforcements arrived at around 2 p.m. The city was reported as being entirely cleared early morning the next day.

== See also ==
- Outline of the Gaza war
