= Wehda Street airstrikes =

Wehda Street airstrikes may refer to:

- 2021 Wehda Street airstrikes
- 2025 Wehda Street airstrikes
