= Engineer's Building airstrike =

2023 Israeli airstrike in Gaza

- Part of the Gaza war
- Location within the Gaza Strip
- Location: 31°26′30.8″N 34°23′34.8″E; Nuseirat, Gaza Strip
- Date: 31 October 2023; ~2:30 p.m. (UTC+02:00)
- Attack type: Airstrike, war crime
- Deaths: 106+ civilians (including at least 54 children)
- Injuries: 12+ civilians
- Perpetrator: Israeli Air Force

On 31 October 2023, the Israel Defense Forces struck a residential building in the Gaza Strip during its operations in Gaza in the Gaza war, killing at least 106 people, including 54 children. Human Rights Watch said there was no evidence of any military targets in the area at the time of the attack, making the strike an apparent war crime.

== Airstrike ==
On 31 October 2023, at about 2:30 pm, four aerial munitions struck the residential building known as the Engineer's Building within about 10 seconds of each other resulting in its total destruction. At the time, at least 350 people were sheltering at the building, at least 150 of whom were seeking shelter after being forced to flee their homes from other parts of Gaza due to Israeli attacks.

Hatem Abdo, whose son was killed in the attack while playing football in a street near the building described the attack: "I saw about 50 children and some young men in the street, near the southern side of the Engineer's building. I saw that the northern side of the building had been hit. Immediately the second bomb hit the southern side, which I could see clearly from my home. I saw debris from the building falling and trapping about 20 of the children, as well as some adults."

Ameera Shaheen, who lost 20 relatives in the strike, said: "There was nothing worrying at all before the attack. Almost all of us were sitting in two rooms, one for men and one for women. Some of us were laughing. We had just baked bread. There were no signs or warning or any feeling of danger. We felt safe because it was an apartment building full of civilians."

== Casualties ==
At least 34 women, 18 men and 54 children were killed in the strike, including children who were playing football outside and residents charging phones in the first-floor grocery store. The victims came from 22 families, with the Abu Said family losing 23 relatives in the strike.

The total number of Palestinians killed in the attack remains unknown. Human Rights Watch identified 106 individuals killed. An investigation by Airwars identified 133 casualties from 14 families, and said that many bodies were still buried under the rubble. The investigation estimated 133-164 casualties, of which 67-77 were children.

== Investigation ==
A Human Rights Watch investigation published on 4 April 2024, concluded that the Israeli attack that hit the Engineer's Building in late October had no apparent militant target, making it an apparent war crime. The report "found no evidence of a military target in the vicinity of the building at the time of the Israeli attack, making the strike unlawfully indiscriminate under the laws of war," adding that upon request the Israeli authorities provided no justification for the attack. The investigation was done in part with survivor interviews, and analysis of satellite imagery, photos, and videos published after the attack. Due to Israeli control of the Gaza border they were unable to enter Gaza and inspect first hand.

The Human Rights Watch called for all countries to "suspend military assistance and arms sales to Israel so long as its forces commit systematic and widespread laws-of-war violations against Palestinian civilians with impunity," further adding that "governments that continue to provide arms to the Israeli government risk complicity in war crimes". The group highlighted the urgency for a International Criminal Court inquiry into the serious crimes committed during the conflict.

== See also ==
- Israeli war crimes in the Gaza war
- Al-Shati refugee camp airstrike
- Flour massacre
- 31 October 2023 Jabalia refugee camp airstrike
- 12 February 2024 Rafah strikes
- Attacks on Palestinians evacuating Gaza City
- Attacks on refugee camps in the Gaza war
- Outline of the Gaza war
