= Background of the Gaza war =

The ongoing Gaza war is a part of the Israeli–Palestinian conflict. Major events in the lead up to the Gaza War include the rise of Zionism and the migration of Jewish settlers to Palestine, the establishment of the State of Israel and the Nakba in the 1948 Palestine war, the Israeli occupation of the Gaza Strip following the 1967 War, the rise of Hamas, Israel's withdrawal from and blockade of the Gaza Strip since 2005, and multiple military confrontations and economic hardships in Gaza leading up to the October 7 attacks by Hamas-led Palestinian militants on Israel.

== Israeli–Palestinian conflict ==
Israeli and Palestinian deaths preceding the 2023 Hamas-led attack on Israel, of which most were civilians.

The Israeli–Palestinian conflict has its origins in the rise of Zionism in the late 19th century in Europe, a movement which aimed to establish a Jewish state through the colonization of Palestine, along with the first arrival of Jewish settlers to Ottoman Palestine in 1882. A civil war between Jews and Palestinian Arabs in Mandatory Palestine broke out in 1947 following the United Nations Partition Plan for Palestine, marking the beginning of the 1948 Palestine war. The war entered an international phase, known as the 1948 Arab–Israeli War, with the establishment of the State of Israel 14 May 1948, the end of the British Mandate at midnight, and the entry of Arab regular armies into the territory the morning of 15 May. During the war, remembered by Palestinians as the Nakba, over 700,000 Palestinians fled or were expelled, creating the Palestinian refugee problem. The war formally ended with the 1949 Armistice Agreements, demarcating the borders of Israel over 78% of the former territory of the mandate according to the Green Line.

In 1967, following the Six-Day War fought between Israel and a coalition of Arab states (primarily Egypt, Syria, and Jordan), Israel occupied the Palestinian territories, including the Gaza Strip which had formerly been occupied by Egypt. A process of Arab-Israeli normalization began in the 1970s, with the fourth and final war between Arab states and Israel ending in 1973 and an Israeli-Egyptian peace treaty signed in 1979. In 1987, the First Intifada, a popular uprising by the Palestinians against the Israeli occupation, began. Following the failure of the subsequent peace talks at the Camp David Summits in 2000, violence once again escalated during the Second Intifada, which ended with the Sharm El Sheikh Summit and Israel's withdrawal from Gaza in 2005 and subsequent blockade. The Israeli closures, together with repeated conflicts, resulted in high levels of poverty, unemployment, and low economic development.

Hamas won the 2006 Palestinian legislative election and formed a government, first alone (early 2006) and then in a grand coalition with Fatah (March 2007) while still being the majority party. In a battle in June 2007, Hamas ousted the remaining Fatah officials and took sole control of the Gaza Strip, leading to further tensions with Israel. Hamas had been responsible up to that time for dozens of suicide bombings within Israeli territory, and its charter (until 2017) called for murder of Jews and the destruction of Israel. Immediately after the January 2006 election, Israel blocked transfers of tax money, collected from Palestinians, to the Hamas-led Palestinian government, leaving government employees in Gaza (37% of Gaza's workforce) without pay. Israel, later joined by Egypt, imposed a blockade that significantly damaged Gaza's economy, citing security concerns as the justification. International rights groups have characterized the blockade as a form of collective punishment, while Israel defended it as necessary to prevent weapons and dual-use goods from entering the territory. The Palestinian Authority has not held national elections since 2006.

Since 2006, Israel has been involved in numerous military confrontations with Hamas and other Palestinian militant groups in Gaza. There have been five previous major hostilities, including two full-scale wars, between Israel and Hamas: in 2006, in 2008–2009, 2012, 2014, and 2021. Hamas's tactics included tunnel warfare and firing rockets into Israeli territory, whereas Israel generally conducted airstrikes and artillery shelling. Israel also conducted ground invasions of Gaza in the 2008–2009 and 2014 wars. In 2018–2019, there were weekly organized protests near the Gaza-Israel border involving thousands of Gazan participants. The protests were met with violence by Israel, with hundreds killed and thousands injured by sniper fire. Surveys in 2023 of Palestinians in Gaza and the West Bank before the war indicated that a majority supported the use of "armed struggle", the creation of "militant groups", and an intifada ("uprising") against the Israeli occupation. The UN Office for the Coordination of Humanitarian Affairs (OCHA) reported roughly 6,400 Palestinians and 300 Israelis were killed in the wider Israeli–Palestinian conflict from 2008 through September 2023 before the start of this war.

Due to the Israeli blockade of the Gaza Strip, UNRWA reported that 81% of people were living below the poverty level in 2023, with 63% being food insecure and dependent on international assistance. According to an analysis in The Independent, the Gaza blockade created hopelessness among Palestinians, which was exploited by Hamas, convincing young Palestinian men that violence was their only solution.

Hamas has been designated as a terrorist organization by a number of Western states and regional blocs, including the US, the UK, Japan, Australia and the EU. China and Russia do not regard Hamas as a terrorist organization, and a 2018 motion to condemn Hamas for "acts of terror" at the UN failed to pass.

In February–March 2021, Fatah and Hamas reached agreement to jointly conduct elections for a new Palestinian legislative assembly, in accordance with the Oslo Accords, and for Hamas to enter the PLO. Hamas committed to upholding international law, transferring control of Gaza to the Palestinian Authority and to allowing it to negotiate with Israel to establish a Palestinian state along the 1967 ceasefire lines, with East Jerusalem as its capital. According to Menachem Klein, Israeli Arabist and political scientist at Bar-Ilan University, Mahmoud Abbas subsequently cancelled the elections under pressure from Israel and the United States. Soon after the 2021 Israel–Palestine crisis exploded, the Al-Qassam Brigades started planning the 7 October 2023 operation.

== Hamas motives ==
Hamas officials stated while announcing the attack that it was a response to the Israeli occupation, blockade of the Gaza Strip, Israeli settler violence against Palestinians, restrictions on the movement of Palestinians, and imprisonment of thousands of Palestinians, whom Hamas sought to release by taking Israeli hostages.

Mohammad Deif, the head of Hamas' Al-Qassam Brigades (their militant wing), said on 7 October that the Hamas attack was in response to what he called the "desecration" of the Al-Aqsa Mosque, and Israel killing and wounding hundreds of Palestinians in 2023.

In his speech, he mentioned that "every day the occupation attacks our towns and homes in the West Bank, spreading corruption by infiltrating houses, arresting, and killing hundreds in this year alone, and the Israeli occupation continues to impose its criminal siege of the Gaza Strip. In the midst of these continuous crimes against our Palestinian people and their rights, in the midst of showing utmost disregard for international laws and resolutions, and in the midst of US and Western support and international silence, we have decided to put an end to all of that and announce a military operation "Al-Aqsa Flood" against the Israeli occupation so that it can no longer revel without punishment".

A speculated additional motive of Hamas was to prevent a diplomatic normalization between Israel and Arab countries that was gaining momentum with the Abraham Accords. But the only aspect of international relations that Hamas or their allies have emphasised is Western and United States support for the occupation. Deif also highlighted other conflicts in the region which he saw as related to the Palestinian struggle.

=== Al-Qassam Brigades' calls for support ===
In his 7 October speech, Mohammed Deif, "Chief of Staff" of the Qassam Brigades, called on Palestinians and members of "Islamic resistance" groups throughout the region to "expel the occupiers and demolish the walls."

Deif instructed the Palestinians in the West Bank, Jerusalem, and Israel to take the opportunity to overthrow the occupation. He then called on people in "all parts of the Arab and Islamic homeland" from Morocco to Indonesia, to "start now, not tomorrow, your daily advance towards Palestine, and do not let borders, regimes or restrictions deprive you of the honour". Deif went on to quote the Quran: "And kill them wherever you confront them, and expel them from where they expelled you." In the same speech Deif directed, "Do not kill the elderly and children, and remove this filth from your land and from your holy things."

=== Long term goals of Hamas ===
Many scholars state that Hamas's objective is the establishment of a Palestinian state within the 1967 borders, while others say that Hamas has repeatedly called for the destruction of the state of Israel. Sources that say Hamas calls for Israel's destruction cite the 1988 Hamas charter, while sources that say Hamas has accepted the 1967 borders cite the 2017 Hamas charter, 2005 Palestinian Cairo Declaration and 2006 Palestinian Prisoners' Document. In 2017, Hamas replaced it with a new charter that removed antisemitic language and said Hamas's struggle was with Zionists, not Jews.

The attack was also seen as a resolution of internal tensions within Hamas as to whether the group's main goal is governing the Gaza Strip or fighting against Israel. Internal strife in Israeli society caused by protests against the judicial reform encouraged Hamas to go ahead with its attack.

On 21 January 2024, Hamas released an 18-page English-language document reiterating its previously stated rationales and framing the attack in a wider context as a struggle against colonialism, describing its actions as "a necessary step and a normal response to confront all Israeli conspiracies against the Palestinian people". It said that "maybe some faults happened" during the attacks "due to the rapid collapse of the Israeli security and military system, and the chaos caused along the border areas with Gaza" and that "[if] there was any case of targeting civilians it happened accidentally". The timing of the release raised questions; sources in Gaza, including those aligned with Hamas, told Haaretz that the document was designed to contend with criticism of the heavy price Gazans have paid for the attacks on Israel.

=== Attempts to persuade Iran and Hezbollah to join ===
Internal documents revealed that Hamas, in an initiative led by Yahya Sinwar, attempted to persuade Iran and Hezbollah to join the October 7 attacks. The group postponed the assault, codenamed "the big project," from its original 2022 date in hopes of securing broader regional involvement. While Iran and Hezbollah expressed support, they were not fully prepared, leading Hamas to proceed without them. This was contested by Drop Site News, which stated that the New York Times had failed to properly verify the documents. This included only showing their one named source a single page (out of 30), despite relying on this source to assess the documents' authenticity.

== Israeli policy ==
The Netanyahu government has been criticized within Israel for having championed a policy of empowering the Hamas government in Gaza by, for instance, granting work permits to Gazan residents, facilitating the transfer of funds to Hamas and maintaining relative calm. By the conclusion of Netanyahu's fifth government in 2021, the issuance of work permits to Gazans reached approximately 2,000–3,000. Later, under the Bennett-Lapid government, this number significantly increased to 10,000, and since Netanyahu's return to power in 2023 the number rose again to 20,000. These workers were accused of spying on Israel and being complicit in the October 7 attack. After the attack, the Israeli war cabinet granted additional 8,000 work permits to West Bank residents, despite concerns about their vetting and potential security risks.

In addition to granting workers permits, millions of dollars from Qatar have been transported into Gaza, escorted by Mossad, Israel's intelligence agency, intended for Gaza's power plant, infrastructure projects and monthly stipends for impoverished Palestinian families, while Israeli officials were aware that Hamas might divert the funds to acquire weapons and rockets.

These strategies towards Hamas have been criticized as having backfired in light of the attacks on 7 October 2023. Critics cautioned that such policies may have strengthened Hamas's power in Gaza while weakening Mahmoud Abbas of the Palestinian Authority in the West Bank, thus sabotaging a two-state solution. This criticism has been echoed by several Israeli officials, including former prime minister Ehud Barak and former head of the Shin Bet internal security service Yuval Diskin. The Palestinian Authority and Saudi Arabia were also critical of Netanyahu's government allowing Qatar to deliver suitcases of money to Hamas in exchange for maintaining the ceasefire. Haaretz and The Nation have described Netanyahu's strategy towards the Palestinian issue as that of "divide-and-conquer". Netanyahu himself has criticized opinions on his responsibility for the 7 October attacks, stating "Did people ask Franklin Roosevelt, after Pearl Harbor, that question? Did people ask George Bush after the surprise attack of November [sic] 11?" referring to the 11 September 2001 terror attacks.

Numerous commentators have identified the broader context of Israeli occupation as a cause of the war. The Associated Press wrote that Palestinians are "in despair over a never-ending occupation in the West Bank and suffocating blockade of Gaza". Several human rights organizations, including Amnesty International, B'Tselem and Human Rights Watch have likened the Israeli occupation to apartheid, although supporters of Israel dispute this characterization.

== 2023 Israeli–Palestinian escalation ==
In 2023, before the October 7 assault, 32 Israelis and two foreign nationals were killed in Palestinian attacks. At least 247 Palestinians had been killed by Israeli forces. Increases in settler attacks had displaced hundreds of Palestinians, and there were clashes around the Al-Aqsa Mosque which sits on the Temple Mount, a contested holy site in Jerusalem. In August 2023, 1,264 Palestinians were held in administrative detention in Israel without charge or trial, which Israel said was necessary to contain dangerous militants.

Tensions between Israel and Hamas rose in September 2023, and the Washington Post described the two "on the brink of war". Israel found explosives hidden in a shipment of jeans and halted all exports from Gaza. In response, Hamas put its forces on high alert, and conducted military exercises with other groups, including openly practicing storming Israeli settlements. Hamas also allowed Palestinians to resume protests at the Gaza–Israel barrier. On 13 September, five Palestinians were killed at the border. According to the Washington Post, the Palestinians were attempting to detonate an explosive device. Al-Jazeera reported that a Palestinian Explosives Engineering Unit was working to deactivate the device. On 29 September, Qatar, the UN, and Egypt mediated an agreement between Israel and Hamas officials in the Gaza Strip to reopen closed crossing points and deescalate tensions.

Simon Tisdall argues that an uptick in Israeli–Palestinian violence in the West Bank in the first half of 2023 had portended war, and stated that Netanyahu's "refusal to contemplate any type of peace process" added "fuel to the smouldering fire" in the context of "the relentless expansion of illegal Israeli settlements". Prior to the attack, Saudi Arabia warned Israel of an "explosion" as a result of the continued occupation, Egypt had warned of a catastrophe unless there was political progress, and similar warnings were given by Palestinian Authority officials. Two months before the attacks, King Abdullah II of Jordan commented that Palestinians have "no civil rights; no freedom of mobility".

== Israeli intelligence failure ==
Israeli intelligence officials initially stated that they had no warnings or indications of the 7 October attack by Hamas, despite Israel exercising extensive monitoring over Gaza. However, in the weeks and days preceding 7 October, the US intelligence community produced at least two assessments based partly on Israeli intelligence warning the Biden administration of an increased risk for Hamas-initiated violence. Egypt said it warned Israel days before the attack, "an explosion of the situation is coming, and very soon, and it would be big". Israel denied receiving such a warning, but the Egyptian statement was corroborated by Michael McCaul, Chairman of the US House Foreign Relations Committee, who said warnings were made three days before the attack.

According to a New York Times report, Israeli officials obtained an approximately 40-page document detailing the Hamas battle plan for its 7 October attack more than a year prior to the actual event. The document described operational plans and targets, including the size and location of Israeli forces, and raised questions in Israel as to how Hamas was able to learn these details. The plans included a large scale rocket assault prior to invasion, drones to knock out surveillance cameras and gun turrets that Israel deployed along the border, and gunmen invading Israel with paragliders. The Times report's authors wrote, "Hamas followed the blueprint with shocking precision". They also claimed the document circulated widely among Israeli military and intelligence leaders who largely dismissed the plan as being beyond Hamas's capabilities, though it was unclear if political leaders were informed. In July 2023, a veteran analyst with the Israeli signals intelligence unit warned other intelligence experts that Hamas was conducting exercises for an assault. A colonel within the IDF's Gaza Division concluded that no real threat was imminent.

The Financial Times and Politico reported that alerts from the signals unit were ignored partly because they originated from lower-ranking female soldiers. Furthermore, these warnings contradicted the Israeli government's belief that it had effectively contained Hamas by blockading Gaza, bombing its military capabilities, and permitting Qatar to channel hundreds of millions of dollars in aid money to Gaza. The upper echelons of Israel's political and military leadership subscribed to the narrative that Hamas had moderated and was seeking to avoid a full-scale war.

In June 2024 it was reported that a document titled "Detailed End-to-End Raid Training" was given to the Israeli public broadcaster Kan. The document was compiled within the IDF's Gaza Division less than three weeks before 7 October, warning that Hamas was training for a large-scale hostage-taking operation. Estimates within the document suggested Hamas aimed to seize 200–250 hostages.

== Israel–Saudi normalization talks ==
At the time of the attack, Israel and Saudi Arabia were conducting negotiations to normalize relations. Amid the negotiations, in early August, Israeli PM Netanyahu rejected a Palestinian state. Neverthelees Saudi Arabian crown prince Mohammed bin Salman said normalization was "for the first time real". This was an apparent reversal of Saudi policy, articulated in the 2002 Arab Peace Initiative, when Saudi Arabia had offered Israel normalization with the whole Arab world if Israel allows the creation of a Palestinian state. Israeli and other officials involved in the negotiations confirmed that the Saudis were considering normalization with Israel without the creation of a Palestinian state. Many Palestinians worried that Israeli-Saudi normalization would cost them their last significant leverage for Palestinian statehood. Most in the US foreign policy establishment believed Palestinian statehood "no longer matters in the Middle East".

Hamas leaders cited disrupting this "normalization train" as a key motive for the October 7 attacks, with Ismail Haniyeh stating that the normalization efforts would marginalize the Palestinian cause and integrate Israel as "a legitimate entity" in the region.

On October 21, US President Joe Biden said the aim of the 7 October attacks was to disrupt the normalization talks. According to Menachem Klein, Israeli normalization with other Middle Eastern states, including Saudi Arabia, threatened to leave the Palestinians "isolated and weak". On 7 February 2024, Saudi Arabia stated that diplomatic relations with Israel requires an independent Palestinian state on 1967 borders with East Jerusalem as its capital. On October 4, three days before the Hamas attack, US diplomat Dennis Ross said Palestinian statehood "is not an option" in the Israeli-Saudi talks. In October 2024, a year after the attacks, Israeli military claimed to have Hamas documents that said it wanted to disrupt Saudi-Israeli talks.

== See also ==
- Mowing the grass

== Literature ==
- Wolfensohn, James (2010). A Global Life.
