= Yahya Sobeih =

Palestinian journalist killed in Israeli airstrike in Gaza

- يحيى صبيح
- Born: c. 1990s Gaza City, Palestine
- Died: 7 May 2025; Gaza City, Palestine
- Occupations: Journalist, editor, reporter
- Known for: Coverage of Gaza during the Gaza war

Yahya Sobeih (Arabic: يحيى صبيح; died 7 May 2025) was a Palestinian journalist, editor, and reporter from Gaza City. He was killed by an Israeli airstrike on 7 May 2025 while reporting in the Al-Rimal neighborhood of Gaza City. Sobeih was among the few remaining journalists in Gaza during the ongoing conflict and was widely recognized for his coverage of daily life, humanitarian issues, and the resilience of Gaza’s population.

== Career ==
Sobeih worked as an independent journalist and editor for local news agencies in Gaza, frequently sharing footage and stories from the ground, including from soup kitchens and community relief efforts. He was known for being “always close to the people” and for highlighting stories of survival and dignity amid the devastation of war.

== Death ==
On 7 May 2025, Yahya Sobeih was killed in an Israeli airstrike that struck a crowded market and a restaurant in the Al-Rimal neighborhood, western Gaza City. At least nine other Palestinians were killed in the same attack, according to local sources. His death occurred just hours after he celebrated the birth of his daughter, sharing a photo and message about her arrival on his Instagram account.

Sobeih’s killing was condemned by press freedom organizations, including Reporters Without Borders and the Committee to Protect Journalists, as part of a broader pattern of attacks on journalists in Gaza since October 2023. By the time of his death, at least 214 journalists had been killed in Gaza during the ongoing Israeli military campaign.

== Personal life ==
Yahya Sobeih was a resident of Gaza City. He welcomed a newborn daughter just hours before his death.

== See also ==
- List of journalists killed during the Israeli–Palestinian conflict
- Attacks on journalists during the Israel–Hezbollah conflict (2023–present)
- Casualties of the Gaza war
- History of Palestinian journalism
- Media coverage of the Gaza war
- Outline of the Gaza war
