= Palermo, California =

Palermo
- census-designated place
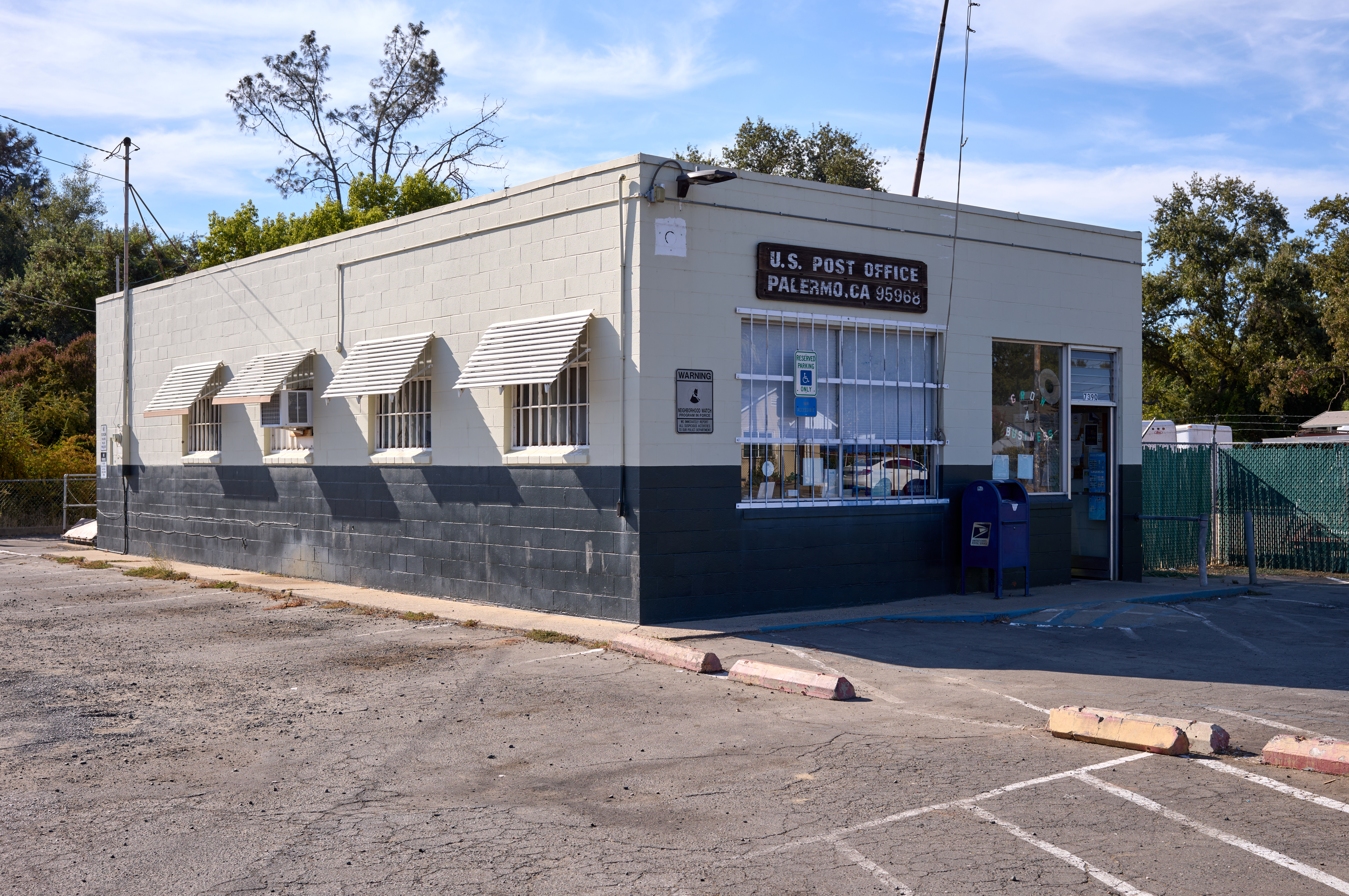
- U.S. Post Office in Palermo (2025)

- Location in Butte County and the state of California

- Location in the United States
- Coordinates: 39°26′08″N 121°32′17″W
- Country: United States
- State: California
- County: Butte

Government
  - State Senator: Megan Dahle (R)
  - State Assembly: Vacant
  - U. S. Congress: James Gallagher (R)

Area
  - Total: 29.176 sq mi (75.566 km^{2})
  - Land: 29.162 sq mi (75.529 km^{2})
  - Water: 0.014 sq mi (0.037 km^{2}) 0.05%
- Elevation: 194 ft (59 m)

Population (2020)
  - Total: 5,555
  - Density: 190.5/sq mi (73.55/km^{2})
- Time zone: UTC-8 (PST)
  - Summer (DST): UTC-7 (PDT)
- ZIP code: 95968
- Area codes: 530, 837
- FIPS code: 06-55086
- GNIS feature IDs: 277571; 2409019

Palermo is a census-designated place (CDP) in Butte County, California, United States. The population was 5,555 at the 2020 census, up from 5,382 at the 2010 census.

== Geography ==
According to the United States Census Bureau, the CDP has a total area of 29.2 square miles (76 km^{2}), of which 99.95% is land and 0.05% is water.

=== Climate ===
According to the Köppen Climate Classification system, Palermo has a warm-summer Mediterranean climate, abbreviated "Csa" on climate maps.

== History ==
The town was named after Palermo, Sicily due to its excellent climate for growing olives. The first post office was established in 1888. The area was home to a country club, two railroad stations, gold mining, a brickyard, a library, a general mercantile store, a school, and even a semi-pro baseball team. The rich clay soil attracted the planting of olive and orange orchards and a thriving zucca melon industry. Mining magnate George Hearst purchased 700 acres in 1888 and then subdivided. There is an annual festival held every September centered at Palermo Park to help raise funds to support the Palermo Community Council's Sheriff Substation.

In December 2024, a disgruntled man experiencing mental illness and homelessness opened fire at the town's Seventh-Day Adventist school, seriously wounding two children before killing himself. He had no known connections to the school but went to an SDA school in nearby Paradise as a child.

== Demographics ==
Historical population
Census	Pop.	Note	%±
1970	1,966		—
1980	2,572		30.8%
1990	5,260		104.5%
2000	5,720		8.7%
2010	5,382		−5.9%
2020	5,555		3.2%
U.S. Decennial Census; 1860–1870 1880-1890; 1900 1910 1920; 1930 1940 1950; 1960 1970 1980; 1990 2000 2010; 2020

Palermo first appeared as an unincorporated community in the 1970 U.S. census; and as a census-designated place in the 1980 United States census.

=== Racial and ethnic composition ===
Palermo CDP, California – Racial and ethnic composition Note: the US Census treats Hispanic/Latino as an ethnic category. This table excludes Latinos from the racial categories and assigns them to a separate category. Hispanics/Latinos may be of any race.
Race / Ethnicity (NH = Non-Hispanic)	Pop 2000	Pop 2010	Pop 2020	% 2000	% 2010	% 2020
White alone (NH)	4,077	3,385	3,256	71.28%	62.89%	58.61%
Black or African American alone (NH)	26	35	62	0.45%	0.65%	1.12%
Native American or Alaska Native alone (NH)	327	188	173	5.72%	3.49%	3.11%
Asian alone (NH)	137	241	276	2.40%	4.48%	4.97%
Native Hawaiian or Pacific Islander alone (NH)	6	3	10	0.10%	0.06%	0.18%
Other race alone (NH)	14	3	23	0.24%	0.06%	0.41%
Mixed race or Multiracial (NH)	241	246	354	4.21%	4.57%	6.37%
Hispanic or Latino (any race)	892	1,281	1,401	15.59%	23.80%	25.22%
Total	5,720	5,382	5,555	100.00%	100.00%	100.00%

=== 2020 census ===
As of the 2020 census, Palermo had a population of 5,555 and a population density of 190.5 inhabitants per square mile (73.6/km^{2}). The age distribution was 22.0% under the age of 18, 7.8% aged 18 to 24, 22.3% aged 25 to 44, 27.3% aged 45 to 64, and 20.7% aged 65 or older. The median age was 42.8 years. For every 100 females, there were 103.1 males, and for every 100 females age 18 and over, there were 105.0 males age 18 and over.

The racial makeup of Palermo was 3,572 (64.3%) White, 69 (1.2%) Black or African American, 216 (3.9%) American Indian and Alaska Native, 279 (5.0%) Asian, 11 (0.2%) Native Hawaiian or Other Pacific Islander, 716 (12.9%) from some other race, and 692 (12.5%) from two or more races. Hispanic or Latino residents of any race were 1,401 people (25.2%).

The whole population lived in households. There were 1,992 households, of which 28.3% had children under the age of 18 living in them. Of all households, 48.9% were married-couple households, 7.0% were cohabiting couple households, 22.1% had a male householder with no spouse or partner present, and 21.9% had a female householder with no spouse or partner present. About 24.3% of all households were one-person households, and 12.6% had someone living alone who was 65 years of age or older. The average household size was 2.79. There were 1,389 families (69.7% of all households).

There were 2,173 housing units, of which 1,992 (91.7%) were occupied. Of occupied units, 75.6% were owner-occupied and 24.4% were occupied by renters. 8.3% of housing units were vacant. The homeowner vacancy rate was 0.9%, and the rental vacancy rate was 6.3%.

41.3% of residents lived in urban areas, while 58.7% lived in rural areas.

=== Demographic estimates ===
In 2023, the US Census Bureau estimated that 9.1% of the population was foreign-born. Of all people aged 5 or older, 80.7% spoke only English at home, 16.8% spoke Spanish, 1.2% spoke other Indo-European languages, 1.1% spoke Asian or Pacific Islander languages, and 0.3% spoke other languages. Of those aged 25 or older, 82.6% were high school graduates and 12.3% had a bachelor's degree.

=== Income and poverty ===
The median household income in 2023 was $47,893, and the per capita income was $29,667. About 14.4% of families and 21.0% of the population were below the poverty line.

=== 2010 census ===
The 2010 United States census reported that Palermo had a population of 5,382. The population density was 184.5 inhabitants per square mile (71.2/km^{2}). The racial makeup of Palermo was 3,901 (72.5%) White, 39 (0.7%) African American, 221 (4.1%) Native American, 246 (4.6%) Asian, 4 (0.1%) Pacific Islander, 642 (11.9%) from other races, and 329 (6.1%) from two or more races. Hispanic or Latino of any race were 1,281 persons (23.8%).

The Census reported that 5,382 people (100% of the population) lived in households, 0 (0%) lived in non-institutionalized group quarters, and 0 (0%) were institutionalized.

There were 1,940 households, out of which 635 (32.7%) had children under the age of 18 living in them, 1,023 (52.7%) were opposite-sex married couples living together, 212 (10.9%) had a female householder with no husband present, 167 (8.6%) had a male householder with no wife present. There were 141 (7.3%) unmarried opposite-sex partnerships, and 7 (0.4%) same-sex married couples or partnerships. 416 households (21.4%) were made up of individuals, and 184 (9.5%) had someone living alone who was 65 years of age or older. The average household size was 2.77. There were 1,402 families (72.3% of all households); the average family size was 3.18.

The population age distribution is 1,310 people (24.3%) under the age of 18, 463 people (8.6%) aged 18 to 24, 1,157 people (21.5%) aged 25 to 44, 1,487 people (27.6%) aged 45 to 64, and 965 people (17.9%) who are 65 years of age or older. The median age was 40.9 years. For every 100 females, there were 105.1 males. For every 100 females age 18 and over, there were 104.0 males.

There were 2,102 housing units at an average density of 72.0 per square mile (27.8/km^{2}), of which 1,940 were occupied, of which 1,480 (76.3%) were owner-occupied, and 460 (23.7%) were occupied by renters. The homeowner vacancy rate was 1.7%; the rental vacancy rate was 8.0%. 4,049 people (75.2% of the population) lived in owner-occupied housing units, and 1,333 people (24.8%) lived in rental housing units.

== Education ==
Most of the CDP is served by the Palermo Union Elementary School District, while parts extend into the Oroville City Elementary School District. All of it falls within the Oroville Union High School District.

The vast majority of high school students who live in Palermo go to Las Plumas High School.
