= December 2023 Salem family airstrikes =

Israeli attack on Palestinians

- Part of the Gaza war
- Location within the Gaza Strip
- Location: Rimal, Gaza City, Gaza Strip
- Date: 19 December 2023
- Attack type: Airstrike
- Deaths: 170+
- Perpetrator: Israel Defense Forces

From 11 to 19 December 2023, four Israeli airstrikes shortly after midnight in the Rimal neighborhood of Gaza City killed over 170 civilians, many of them from Salem family. Many of the victims had evacuated their homes in northern Gaza, and were sheltering in central Gaza.

== Airstrike and casualties ==
According the Mohammed Salem, who witnessed four airstrikes directly hit the shelter on a building across the street from the villa, the villa collapsed and bodies were flung outside. After daybreak, he said that he and a cousin watched Israel Defense Forces (IDF) tanks roll over bodies half-buried in debris. He told the Associated Press (AP) that, of the more than 200 Salem family members sheltering in the structure, only 10 are still alive. The attack killed over 50 children, burying them under the rubble.

Sabreen Salem, who survived the attacks, alleged that Israeli tanks ran over victims when they were still alive, and said: "there were women who were pregnant, and they took out the fetuses out of their stomachs". According to her testimony, there were 135 Palestinians sheltering in the house, and 12 survived the attack.

== Reactions ==
Those killed were relatives of Palestinian freelance photojournalist Hussam Salem, living in Istanbul, who shared memories of his family to social media. He said that four generations of the Salem family had been wiped from the Gaza Civil Registry in the attacks.

== See also ==
- Gaza genocide
- Israeli war crimes in the Gaza war
- Outline of the Gaza war
- Timeline of the Israeli–Palestinian conflict in 2023
