= Nasser Hospital mass graves =

Mass grave site in Khan Yunis

- Part of Gaza mass graves during the Gaza war and genocide
- Location: Nasser Hospital, Khan Yunis, Gaza Strip
- Date: 20 April 2024 (discovery)
- Deaths: 310+

The Nasser Hospital mass graves were discovered on 20 April 2024 by Palestinian families returning to Nasser Hospital after the withdrawal of Israeli forces following the Nasser Hospital siege, a major event in the ongoing Gaza war. According to independent analysis, the graves were discovered in the same location as earlier mass burials by Palestinians.

== Background ==
Since the start of the Gaza war, Israel attacked, damaged, or destroyed nearly every hospital in the Gaza Strip. In January 2024, the Gaza Health Ministry (GHM) said that 40 bodies were buried inside the hospital due to: "the siege on the neighbourhoods close to Nasser [Hospital]". A Nasser Hospital official had told journalists in January that hospital staff had buried around 150 bodies in the hospital's yard.

The hospital was shelled multiple times throughout the war and received significant international media coverage after the death of a 13-year-old amputee, Donia Abu Mohsen, who had survived a previous Israeli airstrike that had killed her entire family. Nasser Hospital was reported to be non-functional after a Israel Defense Forces (IDF) raid in February.

Israeli soldiers entered the hospital on 15 February 2024 from the south; according to a spokesman for the Gaza Health Ministry (GHM) they destroyed tents and bulldozed a mass grave. Israel stated it exhumed and examined some 400 corpses looking for Israeli hostages. (Note: On 7 March, Israeli returned the corpses of 47 people whose bodies had been removed from the grave.)

Due to power outages during the entry of Israeli soldiers into the hospital, five patients in the hospital died. On 18 February, the World Health Organization (WHO) said the hospital could no longer serve its patients, and that the hospital was no longer functional. Tedros Adhanom Ghebreyesus attributed the hospital's inability to continue operating to the Israeli siege and raid.

As of 23 February 2024, the hospital no longer had food, water, or oxygen for patients. The Gaza Health Ministry (GHM) attributed thirteen patient deaths to the lack of electricity and oxygen at the hospital.

Mass graves had previously been discovered at al-Shifa Hospital after the siege there ended earlier in 2024.

== Discovery ==
The mass graves were discovered within the hospital itself after the retreat of Israeli soldiers in April 2024. Local officials stated that several of the bodies were found with their hands and feet bound. The casualties include children and elderly women. Some bodies were also found buried under piles of waste.

By 22 April 2024, 283 bodies had been recovered from one mass grave, while rescue workers reported two additional graves had yet to be exhumed. 42 bodies were identified. A spokesperson for the Office of the United Nations High Commissioner for Human Rights (OHCHR) said that there were "allegedly older people, women and wounded" among the dead and others that had their hands tied and were stripped of clothes. A spokesman for Palestinian Civil Defense (PCD) said some of the bodies found were handcuffed, shot in the head, or wearing detainee uniforms. The Civil Defense stated they believed approximately 20 people had been buried alive. The PCD also said that the 283 bodies were from a temporary burial area dug during the siege. People were not able to access cemeteries at the time and buried the dead in the hospital yard. The group said that some of the casualties were from the siege and others were from the raid.

As of 24 April 2024, medical officials stated they had recovered a total of more than 300 people, with the OHCHR stating some corpses had been found naked with their hands bound. On 25 April, Palestinian journalist Akram al-Satarri reported that many of the bodies that continue to be unearthed show signs of torture, mutilation, and summary execution. According to Palestinian civil officials, some bodies also still had medical devices attached from their stay in the hospital. The three mass graves were thought to contain a total of about 700 bodies.

According to a report by France 24, based on analysis of photographs and video, the location of the exhumations is around the same area as the earlier mass burials, but there is no way to verify how many bodies were buried there prior to the Israeli withdrawal in April 2024. GeoConfirmed presented a similar analysis, saying that the exhumations took place at the same location as the earlier mass burials conducted by Palestinians, although they didn't exclude the possibility that the graves had been added to by Israeli forces.

== Reactions ==
=== Israeli ===
The Israeli Defense Forces (IDF) said the accusations of them causing the killings were "baseless and unfounded". The IDF said that during its operation:

"In the area of Nasser Hospital, in accordance to the effort to locate hostages and missing persons, corpses buried by Palestinians in the area of Nasser Hospital were examined."

=== International ===
They further stated that: "bodies examined, which did not belong to Israeli hostages, were returned to their place". Sky News published an analysis of satellite imagery and social media footage of mass graves dug by Palestinians during Israel's siege, which were later bulldozed by the IDF.

The UN High Commissioner for Human Rights (OHCHR) said the attack indicated: "serious violations of international human rights law and international humanitarian law".

The Organisation of Islamic Cooperation (OIC) called for a probe into the mass graves, terming them: "a war crime, a crime against humanity, and organised state terrorism". A spokesperson for al-Haq stated: "Initial reports from Nasser Hospital show that some of the bodies of the killed people had their hands tied behind their back". Marwan Bishara, the senior political analyst for Al Jazeera English, stated: "Israel might be able to resist this politically and legally, but this is going to enter history".

==== Calls for investigation ====
United Nations (UN) rights chief Volker Türk said that he was "horrified" by the site and called for an international investigation. Geoffrey Robertson, an international lawyer and professor, called for an investigation, stating: "It's a crime against humanity. This case cries out for an independent inquiry. And the sooner, the better". According to Al Jazeera, the American deputy ambassador to the UN stated the United States was not supporting calls for an independent investigation. The International Rescue Committee (IRC) called for: "an immediate international and independent investigation". António Guterres stated:

"It is imperative that independent international investigators, with forensic expertise, are allowed immediate access to the sites of these mass graves, to establish the precise circumstances under which hundreds of Palestinians lost their lives and were buried, or reburied."

When asked if Israel would investigate the mass graves, an IDF spokesperson stated: "Investigate what? We gave answers". Kenneth Roth, the former head of Amnesty International, stated an investigation: "would require simply cooperation by both sides, but Israel doesn't want to allow these kinds of independent investigations".

== See also ==
- Gaza Strip mass graves
- 2025 Nasser Hospital strikes
- Gaza genocide
- Outline of the Gaza war
- Timeline of the Israeli–Palestinian conflict in 2024
- Timeline of the Gaza war (24 November 2023 – 11 January 2024)
- Timeline of the Gaza war (12 January 2024 – 6 May 2024)
- Israeli war crimes in the Gaza war
