= Mowing the grass =

Israel Defense Forces tactic

Mowing the grass (Hebrew: כיסוח דשא) is a metaphor used to describe periodic Israeli attacks on the Gaza Strip to manage the Israeli-Palestinian conflict. During such attacks, Israel has targeted Palestinian militants, civilians, and civilian infrastructure in the Gaza Strip.

The strategy is usually carried out by conducting short, sharp military operations to maintain a certain level of control over the area without committing to a long-term political solution, similar to how one would mow a lawn to keep it neat and tidy.

The term was coined by Efraim Inbar and Eitan Shamir, two scholars associated with the Begin-Sadat Center for Strategic Studies, where they described how "Israel is acting in accordance with a “mowing the grass” strategy. After a period of military restraint, Israel is acting to severely punish Hamas for its aggressive behavior, and degrading its military capabilities – aiming at achieving a period of quiet."

According to Adam Taylor in The Washington Post, "the phrase implies the Palestinian militants in the Gaza Strip and their supply of crude but effective homemade weapons are like weeds that need to be cut back."

Naftali Bennett referred to the idea in a speech in 2018 when he said "מי שלא מכסח את הדשא, הדשא מכסח אותו" ('He who does not mow the grass, the grass mows him').
