= Alaa Shreiteh =

Palestinian Hamas militant (1979–2024)

- علاء أديب عبد الجبار شريتح
- Born: Alaa Adeeb Abdel-Jabbar Shreiteh; 22 December 1979; Tulkarm, West Bank, Palestine
- Died: 4 May 2024 (aged 44); Deir al-Ghusun, West Bank, Palestine
- Children: 3
- Military career
- Allegiance: Palestine; Hamas
- Rank: Military commander
- Commands: Leader of the Al-Qassam Brigades in the West Bank
- Conflicts: Second Intifada; Gaza war †

Alaa Adeeb Abdel-Jabbar Shreiteh (Arabic: علاء أديب عبد الجبار شريتح, romanized: ‘alā’ adeeb ‘abd al jabbar shraytaḥ; 22 December 1979 – 4 May 2024) was a Palestinian militant. Born and raised in Tulkarm, he was the head of the Al-Qassam Brigades in the West Bank until his death. Having been imprisoned by Israel for 14 years until his release in 2016, he led the planning of several Palestinian offensive operations against Israeli forces during the Gaza war, one of the most notable being the attack on Route 557 in the Tulkarm Governorate, which caused several Israeli casualties and was the first recorded Palestinian operation in the West Bank in 20 years, leading to him becoming one of Israel's most wanted until his death in a gunfight in an Israeli raid on Deir al-Ghusun.

== Life and military career ==
Alaa Adeeb Abdel-Jabbar Shreiteh was born in Tulkarm, Palestine, on 22 December 1979, where he grew up and received his education.

He was arrested by Israel on 26 November 2002 for being a member of Hamas and for orchestrating attacks using improvised explosive devices during the Second Intifada. He faced "severe torture" during interrogation as reported by the Palestinian Prisoners Center for Studies, and was released on 24 March 2016 after spending 14 years in Israeli prison.

He married after his release, fathering three children. He later continued his university education in the domain of Islamic Sharia, which he could not complete due to his death.

He became a military commander in Palestine's West Bank, where he led the planning of various Palestinian military operations against Israel, notably the 2 November 2023 attack on Route 557, which was the first Palestinian military operation in the West Bank in 20 years. Shreiteh was then pursued by Israel, which raided his home several times before finally killing him on 4 May 2024.

== Death ==
=== Battle ===
At around 11:00 (PSST) on 3 May 2024, Shreiteh and three other members of the Al-Qassam Brigades were surrounded by the Israeli army in a house in the town of Deir al-Ghusun in the Tulkarm Governorate, where a violent clash ensued between them, followed by the arrival of Israeli reinforcements with more than 50 military vehicles and four military bulldozers. The Israeli army kept the house surrounded for 15 hours, during which air and drone strikes were called on the house. After fully bulldozing the house with everyone inside with the military bulldozers, Israel announced that it had succeeded in killing Shreiteh and the three other members, alongside a fifth member whose identity remained unknown.

=== Funeral ===
Shreiteh's body was buried in Turkalm on 15 May 2024 with the attendance of thousands of Palestinians after the identity of his body was confirmed through a DNA test. The funeral procession set off from the Martyr Dr. Thabet Thabet Governmental Hospital towards his home on Haddadeen Street, where he was given a "last farewell look". He was then transported to the Uthman Ibn Affan Mosque, where prayers were prayed on him, before burying him in the western cemetery.
