= 2025 Wehda Street airstrikes =

May 2025 bombing of a street in an Israeli attack

- Part of the Gaza war
- Location: Wehda Street, Gaza Strip
- Date: 7 May 2025
- Attack type: Airstrikes
- Deaths: 33+ Palestinians
- Injuries: 90+ Palestinians
- Perpetrator: Israel Defense Forces

On 7 May 2025, the Israel Defense Forces (IDF) struck a crowded restaurant and market in Wehda Street in the Rimal neighborhood in northern Gaza. The attack killed at least 33 Palestinians, and wounded at least 90 others.

== Background ==
On 18 March 2025, Israel launched a surprise attack on the Gaza Strip, effectively ending the 2025 Gaza war ceasefire and resuming the Gaza war. On the first day, Israel's attacks killed at least 404 Palestinians, including 263 women and children, making it one of the deadliest in the Gaza war.

For months following March 2025, Israel blocked all humanitarian aid from entering the strip, including all food and water, which contributed to conditions of the Gaza Strip famine. In May 2025, Israel announced plans to displace more residents and force all two million residents of the Gaza Strip to live in the south.

== Attack ==
On 7 May 2025, an Israel Defense Forces (IDF) reconnaissance drone strike targeted the area near the Thai and Palmyra restaurants. Two missiles were fired at the same time and killed at least 33 people, both inside the restaurants and at the street's busy intersection. Images of the killed people were shared on social media.

== Reactions ==
The Palestinian Freedom Movement condemned the attack as a "barbaric and blatant aggression".

== See also ==
- Timeline of the Israeli–Palestinian conflict in 2025
- Timeline of the Gaza war (18 March 2025 – 15 May 2025)
- Israeli war crimes in the Gaza war
- Outline of the Gaza war
- Gaza genocide
