= Killing of David Ben Avraham =

Shooting of a Palestinian Jewish convert in the West Bank

- Part of the Israeli–Palestinian conflict and Gaza war
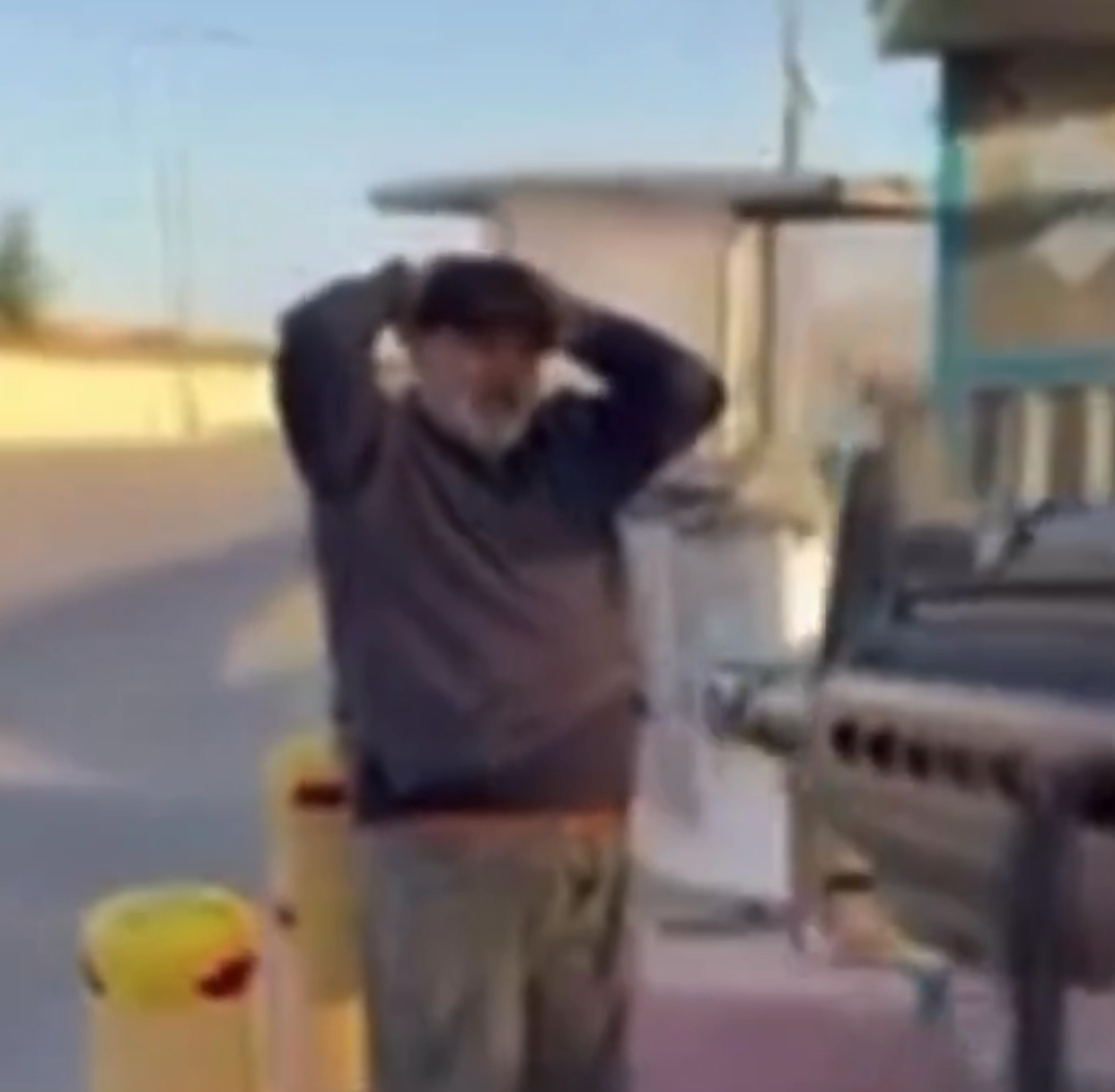
- Snapshot of footage from the Israeli reservist's body camera, showing Ben Avraham with his hands on his head moments before he was shot.

- Location in the Israeli-occupied West Bank
- Location: 31°39′36″N 35°8′31″E; Elazar
- Date: 21 March 2024
- Attack type: Shooting
- Deaths: 1 (Ben Avraham)
- Perpetrator: Israel Defense Forces

On 21 March 2024, David Ben Avraham (Hebrew: דוד בן אברהם), a 63-year-old Palestinian Jewish convert, was shot and killed by an Israel Defense Forces (IDF) soldier near Elazar, an Israeli settlement in the Israeli-occupied West Bank. The soldier had approached Ben Avraham and asked whether he was Jewish, to which he responded affirmatively. In the ensuing encounter, the soldier pointed his rifle at Ben Avraham and threatened to kill him if he reached for his bag, then ordered him to raise his hands and not move. Ben Avraham raised his hands for a few seconds, then lowered them before being fatally shot.

The IDF opened an investigation into what it termed a "grave" incident; the soldier, a reservist, was released a week later by an Israeli court. The Jerusalem Post stated that the killing joined a series of "wrongful mistaken killings" of Jewish Israelis and Palestinian Israelis since the October 7 attacks "in which, to date, the prosecution and courts have been extremely lenient on the killers."

Born Sameh Zaytoun, Ben Avraham was a resident of Hebron and had changed his name upon converting from Islam to Judaism. Following his conversion, he was jailed by the Palestinian Authority for 58 days in 2019. The Israeli government repeatedly denied his applications for Israeli citizenship, which The Times of Israel stated was "ostensibly due to his Palestinian heritage". On 29 March, Israeli Interior Minister Moshe Arbel posthumously approved Ben Avraham's residency status.

== Background ==
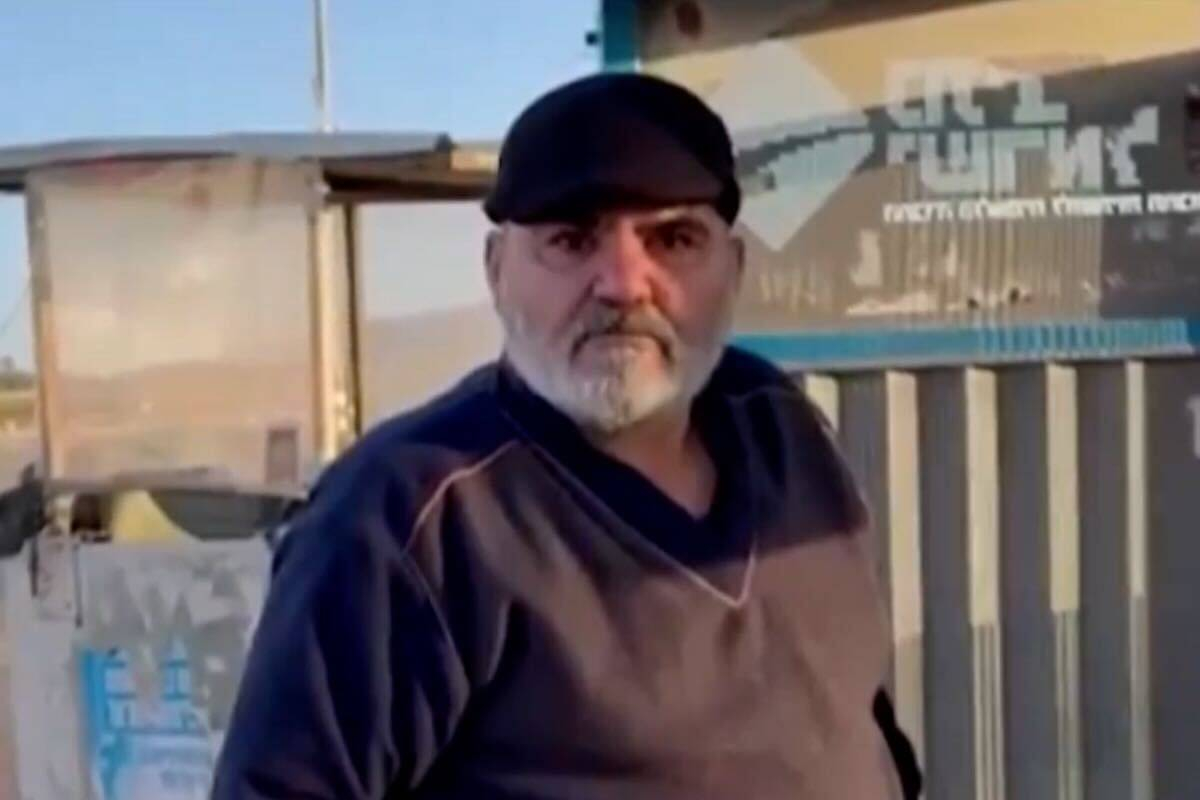
Ben Avraham moments before his death

Born Sameh Muhammad Abd al-Rai Zaytoun (Arabic: سامح محمد عبد الراي زيتون, romanized: Sāmiḥ Muḥammad ʿAbd ar-Rāy Zaytūn), Ben Avraham had converted to Judaism from Islam a number of years ago in honour of his grandfather, who had saved 25 Jews during the 1929 Hebron massacre. Zaytoun's attempts to formalize his conversion were rebuffed several times by Israeli authorities, until he eventually succeeded in the Israeli city of Bnei Brak, where he changed his name to David Ben Avraham. After his conversion, Ben Avraham's applications for Israeli citizenship had been repeatedly denied, which The Times of Israel stated may have been because he was Palestinian. Avraham was a resident of Hebron.

In 2019, Ben Avraham was arrested and jailed by the Palestinian Authority for 58 days in Hebron, where he was reportedly tortured by guards and attacked and beaten by other inmates after they discovered that he had converted to Judaism. Palestinian religious figures also visited him in prison to convince him to retract his conversion, but he declined. A number of Israelis rallied for his release, including a resident of Hebron who organized a hunger strike for two weeks. Another fundraised for his bail, which was disbursed to a Hebron Palestinian court. Following his release from prison, Israeli first responders picked him up from the prison in a wheelchair.

== Killing ==
CCTV footage of Ben Avraham's confrontation with the Israeli soldier and his subsequent killing

Footage from the soldier's body camera, showing the argument between the two before Ben Avraham was fatally shot

According to available CCTV and bodycam footage reported on by The Times of Israel, Ben Avraham exited a Palestinian taxi on the morning of 21 March 2024 at a bus station near the settlement of Elazar in the Israeli-occupied West Bank. A reservist of the Israel Defense Forces (IDF) then approached him and a confrontation ensued between the two. During the exchange, the reservist did not appear to believe that Ben Avraham was Jewish. Ben Avraham reached for his bag and was stopped by the reservist who said, "Touch that and I'll kill you, do you understand me?" The reservist then ordered Ben Avraham to raise his hands and not move. Ben Avraham placed his hands on his head, then lowered them again before he was shot.

Soldiers became suspicious when Ben Avraham got off at a bus stop that Palestinians did not typically use, and when a knife was found in Ben Avraham's bag. Noam Arnon, a friend of Ben Avraham’s and a Hebron spokesperson, said that Ben Avraham carried the knife in his bag for self-defense.

The IDF opened an investigation into what it called a "grave incident". The reservist's attorneys opined that "we do not doubt that the investigation will clarify the chain of events and the case [of David Ben Avraham] will end with an additional excellence award awarded to the soldier". The attorneys also said that the soldier "recently was honored for his bravery in thwarting the ramming attack that took place about three weeks ago in Gush Etzion." Israeli law does not allow use of lethal force in cases where an arrest is easily achievable.

The reservist was detained by authorities. He was released a week later by the order of an Israeli military court judge, who said that the reservist had several reasons to believe that Ben Avraham was a "terrorist". The Israeli judge said that Ben Avraham exited a taxi with Palestinian license plates near a settlement; that he told the reservist that he was going to Jerusalem despite not having a permit to enter Jerusalem; that he spoke Hebrew with an Arabic accent; that a knife had been found in his bag; that soldiers had been warned of potential "terrorist" activity; and that he had lowered his hands. Arnon said that Ben Avraham was continuing his study in religion and was on his way to Jerusalem the day he was shot by the army reservist.

Ben Avraham's death occurred during heightened tensions associated with the ongoing Gaza war and violent incidents in the West Bank. Two days before his killing, a gunman had fired on two members of Israel's Shin Bet security service at a location about two kilometers (1.2 miles) from the Elazar bus stop. Over 350 Palestinians had been killed by Israeli soldiers and settlers in the occupied West Bank since the start of the war on 7 October 2023, mostly during attacks or clashes with Israeli troops. The Jerusalem Post said Ben Avraham's killing joins a series of "wrongful mistaken killings" of Jewish-Israelis and Arab-Israelis that have occurred since 7 October, "in which, to date, the prosecution and courts have been extremely lenient on the killers".

After Ben Avraham's death, Israeli Minister of Interior Moshe Arbel granted Ben Avraham's request for Israeli residency, with Arbel commenting that this was to fulfill Ben Avraham's "last wish to be part of the Israeli people" as a form of "justice, even if it is too late and under tragic circumstances".

== Funeral ==
Jewish custom is to bury the dead as soon as possible. Ben Avraham's burial was postponed for more than two weeks because his family opposed him receiving a Jewish funeral and submitted an appeal to bury him themselves in Hebron. A family court in Tel Aviv determined that Ben Avraham's conversion was proof that he wanted to be buried in a Jewish ceremony and authorized the funeral to move forward. Hebrew media outlets reported that dozens of residents from neighboring settlements attended his funeral. He was buried in Har Bracha, an Israeli West Bank settlement.

== See also ==
- Killing of Eyad al-Hallaq
