= Attacks on Palestinians evacuating Gaza City =

2023 attacks on fleeing Palestinians

- Part of the Gaza war
- Location: Gaza Strip
- Date: 13 October 2023 – present (3 years, 2 weeks and 5 days)
- Attack type: Disputed (airstrike; possible IED)
- Deaths: 70+ Palestinians killed
- Injuries: 200+
- Victim: Gaza Palestinians

Since October 2023, multiple attacks during the Gaza war hit Palestinians attempting to leave northern Gaza City. On 13 October, an airstrike occurred after an evacuation directive from Israel, urging more than a million residents from northern Gaza to move to the southern part of the territory. The airstrike killed 70 people, mostly women and children, and injured 200.

== Background ==
Tensions escalated when Hamas, the group in control of Gaza, launched an attack on Israel. Israel responded with a series of airstrikes on Gaza. The Israel Defense Forces (IDF) issued a warning to residents in the northern regions to evacuate by a specific deadline. However, the United Nations considered this evacuation order both impractical and impracticable to execute safely due to the significant number of people it affected.

== Attacks ==
=== Missile attacks ===
==== 13 October 2023 ====
On 13 October, Israel ordered the entire population of northern Gaza to move south, forcing more than one million people to flee their homes. Following the order, 70 people were killed on the evacuation convoys heading south to Gaza, mostly women and children. While airstrikes persisted in the south, Palestinians initiated evacuations from northern Gaza. According to Hamas officials' reports, these attacks led to the loss of lives primarily women and children. According to the Hamas media office, these airstrikes were carried out on vehicles leaving Gaza City. These cars were targeted at three points.

Although there are disputes about the exact details of the attacks, a number of sources attribute responsibility to an Israeli missile strike. When analysing video footage of the event, the Financial Times reported that it "appears to rule out most explanations aside from an Israeli strike." British Army major and munitions expert Chris Cobb-Smith stated that a missile was the most likely cause of the explosions seen in the videos. Another munitions expert, Desmond Travers, considered an Israeli attack to be the most plausible explanation, although he did not rule out other possible explanations.

Other sources, including the BBC, reported the event without suggesting the responsible party, and some sources pointed to the absence of airstrike signatures in photographed material, suggesting roadside bombings. Israel directly accused Hamas of blocking Palestinian evacuation, in order to use them as "human shields".

==== 3 November 2023 ====
On 3 November, fourteen people were killed by an Israeli bombardment while attempting to evacuate northern Gaza. On 11 November, the United Nations noted several explosions had hit the evacuation corridor on Salah al-Din Road, resulting in fatalities and injuries.

==== 20 September 2025 ====
On 20 September, Israeli forces struck a truck carrying civilians attempting to flee northern Gaza following military evacuation orders. The attack occurred in the Nasr area of Gaza and resulted in the deaths of at least four people.

=== Gunfire attacks ===
==== 26 October 2023 ====
On 26 October, the IDF released an audio recording which it said featured a Gaza resident stating that Hamas was shooting at people attempting to evacuate northern Gaza.

==== 7 November 2023 ====
Civilians waved white flags as they passed Israeli tanks, though they reported Israeli soldiers firing at them anyway and passing dead bodies along the road. The IDF said that troops were under Hamas fire when trying to open the temporary evacuation road for civilians.

==== 13 January 2024 ====
On 13 January 2024, a Palestinian grandmother was shot by an Israeli sniper while holding her grandson's hand, waving a white flag, and walking on the evacuation route which had been declared safe.

==== 10 September 2025 ====
On 10 September 2025, at least 13 people, including local television journalist Mohammad Alaa Al-Sawalhi, were killed while complying with orders to leave Gaza City, according to local health authorities. The deaths occurred as civilians were fleeing the city amid ongoing Israeli strikes and gunfire.

=== Tank attacks ===
On 27 October, Israel began a ground-level invasion into the Gaza Strip, with tanks entering and surrounding the areas around Gaza City.

==== 30 October 2023 ====
On 30 October, residents evacuating Gaza City near Netzarim were hit by tank shelling, which opened-fire on their vehicle while they attempted to u-turn. Video of the attack appeared to show the vehicle destroyed. Three people were reported killed.

==== 22 February 2024 ====
On 22 February 2024, a family attempting to flee Gaza City were hit by Israeli tank fire, despite waving white flags.

== Responses ==
Wafa, the official Palestinian news agency, described the 13 October attack as "a new massacre". The Palestine Red Crescent Society, a medical organization, said: "We have not left and will not leave. Our medics will carry on their humanitarian duties. We won’t leave people to face death alone.”

== See also ==
- Al-Shifa ambulance airstrike
- Israeli blockade of the Gaza Strip (2023–present)
- Israeli war crimes in the Gaza war
- Gaza genocide
- Outline of the Gaza war
