= 2024 Feather River School shooting =

Shooting attack in California, U.S.

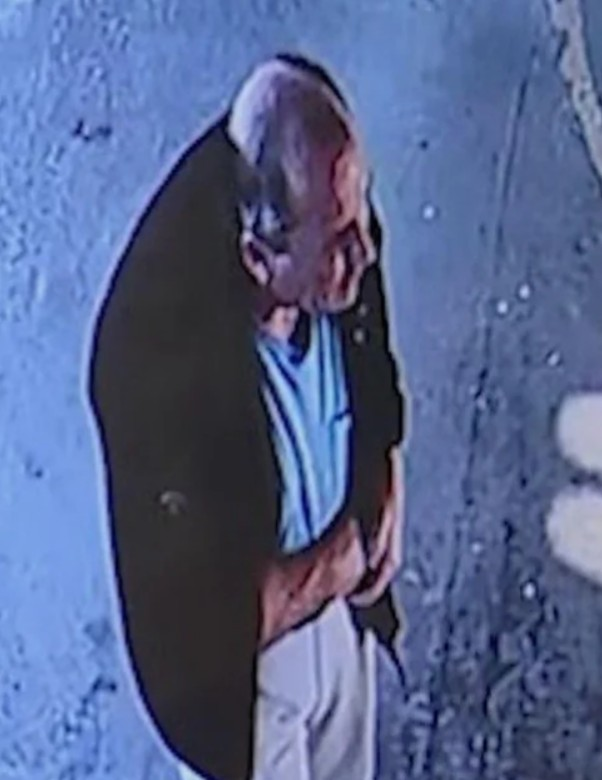
- Glenn Litton reaching into his coat before pulling out his gun
- Location: 39°27′14.4″N 121°31′57.3″W; Feather River Adventist School; Palermo, California, U.S.
- Date: December 4, 2024; 22 months ago 1 p.m. (UTC−08:00)
- Target: Students at the Feather River School
- Attack type: School shooting, attempted pedicide
- Weapon: 9mm Glock 19 “ghost gun”
- Deaths: 1 (the perpetrator)
- Injuries: 2
- Perpetrator: Glenn Nathan Litton
- Motive: Possible Anti-Christian sentiment (Seventh-day Adventists specifically); U.S. involvement in the Gaza war

On December 4, 2024, a gunman attacked the Feather River School of the Seventh-day Adventists in Palermo, California, United States.

Two boys, aged 5 and 6, were critically wounded. The gunman immediately shot and killed himself nearby. The shooter, Glenn Litton, 56, had a criminal history consisting mostly of theft and property crimes, had mental health complications and experienced homelessness. He stated that the shooting was a retaliation for the U.S. involvement in the "genocide and oppression of Palestinians along with the attacks towards Yemen".

Butte County, California Sheriff Kory Honea labeled the shooting a terrorist attack, as the attacker "intended to strike fear in the hearts of the parents".

== Perpetrator ==
The gunman, 56-year-old Glenn Litton, a former resident from Carson City, Nevada, had an extensive history of criminal conduct (including theft, fraud, and forgery) across various states (including California, Arizona, and Nevada) dating back to his juvenile days in the 1970s and 1980s, and had recently been released from the San Bernardino County Jail, where he was serving a sentence for a felony charge. Some of his arrests include cultivating marijuana and petty theft before serving his first prison sentence in 1991, as well as various robberies including stealing the identities of several Butte County residents to charge thousands of dollars on credit cards before buying a disguise at a Butte County wig shop in 2002, stealing money at a CVS Pharmacy in Phoenix, Arizona, in March 2024, and stealing a U-Haul in Chico in November 2024 before being placed in custody at a traffic stop in South San Francisco. Litton attended a Seventh Day Adventist school in Paradise, California, and may have had a child or relative who attended Feather River before the shooting took place. Litton planned to attack another SDA school in Northern California, in another area or county.

At the time of the shooting, Litton was living in several motels in Chico for a few months after living off the streets of Sacramento. According to local police, Litton targeted the school due to the religious affiliation with the Church of the Seventh-Day Adventists. A note found on Litton's body said he intended to perform "child executions" in response to "America's involvement with Genocide and Oppression of Palestinians along with the attacks towards Yemen". He believed that there was a connection with the church and the ongoing Gaza war.

== Attack ==
Litton was staying at a Motel 6 in Chico on the morning of the shooting. At around 8:30 a.m. that morning, Litton got on a bus to Oroville with a large duffle bag before arriving in Oroville around two hours later. Shortly before 11 a.m., Litton went into a Raley's Supermarket there to purchased an energy drink before purchasing an Uber an hour later under a fake name. The Uber driver arrived a few minutes before 12 p.m. and dropped him off at Feather River around ten minutes later. Litton had set an appointment with one of the school administrators in regards to enrolling his fictitious grandson at the school. It's unclear if the meeting was legitimate or a ruse for the suspected gunman to get inside, the sheriff's office said. The meeting was characterized as "cordial" and did not raise any concerns with the school administrator.

Litton used a false identity that matched a fake driver's license he was arrested with in San Francisco before entering the school to meet the principal. Following the meeting, Litton opened fire on students who were outside during their lunch recess, hitting two kindergarten students. A 911 call was made as shots were being fired. About 90 seconds after the 911 call was made, a local police officer arrived on the scene. He found Litton lying on the ground of the playground with a handgun nearby, which was determined to be the weapon used to shoot the children. The two kindergartners were hospitalized in a nearby hospital, and were declared to be in critical but stable condition. A fund aimed at providing support for the victims has been opened by the North Valley Community Foundation.

== Victims ==
Two students were critically injured, Roman Mendez, 6, and Elias Wolford, 5. They were immediately transported away from their school campus near the city of Oroville to the hospital, one by ambulance, the other by helicopter. Later, the Butte County Sheriff's Office reported on Thursday that the boys were in "critical but stable" condition and will continue to receive treatment at a hospital, providing some hope to the children's parents.

On December 13, the family of Elias Wolford shared an update on his medical progress. "Since being hospitalized Elias has not had movement of his legs," wrote Debbie Wolford, grandmother of the injured student. According to her, doctors are unsure if Elias will fully recover after an MRI revealed significant damage from a bullet to his spinal cord.

On December 16, Elias' grandmother reported that after Elias's condition deteriorated, and that he underwent emergency surgery on Saturday night. According to her, Elias' kidney was leaking, which led to fluid buildup in his abdomen, which the surgeons found. A drain tube was placed to treat the leaking kidney and another to drain the fluid from his abdomen after the surgery. According to her, Elias's condition had considerably improved by Sunday. According to his family, Elias was feeling better, and displaying signs of recovery, such as smiling and talking. On December 30, after three surgeries and nearly one month after the shooting, Elias for the first time was able to wiggle his left foot, according to his grandmother.

Already on December 20, the other victim, Roman Mendez, had been released from hospital after several surgeries. However, his twin brother Armani, who witnessed the shooting, is severely traumatized.

== See also ==
- List of school shootings in the United States by death toll
- List of school shootings in the United States (2000–present)
