= Gaza Strip mass graves =

Mass graves found during the Gaza war

During the Gaza war, mass graves have been widely used in the Gaza Strip by Palestinians, with the courtyards of many hospitals converted.

In April 2024, mass graves were discovered in the Gaza Strip during the Gaza war. Such graves were found in two large hospitals, Nasser Hospital and Al-Shifa Hospital, both of which were raided by the Israeli Defense Forces (IDF). Mass graves had previously been established in the courtyards of both hospitals, and according to independent analysis the grave found in Nasser hospital was in the same location as one established by Palestinians months previously. Graves were also found in Beit Lahia, and used in Deir al-Balah. More than 300 bodies have been found as of 24 April 2024. By 11 May 2024, the number had risen to 520, per the Gaza Ministry of Health. As of May 31 2024, seven mass graves in Gaza had been discovered.

The discovery has caused international concern over potential war crimes and calls for an investigation, including by the United Nations (UN). Several officials at the UN have cited reports that an unspecified amount of the bodies found had their hands tied.

The IDF said the accusations of them causing the killings were "baseless and unfounded." The IDF said that during its operation "in the area of Nasser Hospital, in accordance to the effort to locate hostages and missing persons, corpses buried by Palestinians in the area of Nasser Hospital were examined." They further stated that "Bodies examined, which did not belong to Israeli hostages, were returned to their place."

== Background ==
Since the start of the Gaza war, Israel has attacked, damaged or destroyed nearly every hospital in the Gaza Strip. In January 2024, the Gazan health ministry said that 40 bodies were buried inside the hospital due to "the siege on the neighbourhoods close to Nasser Hospital". A Nasser hospital official had told journalists in January that hospital staff had buried around 150 bodies in the hospital's yard.

The hospital was shelled multiple times throughout the war and received significant international media coverage after the death of a 13-year-old amputee, Donia Abu Mohsen, who had survived a previous Israeli airstrike that had killed her entire family. Nasser Hospital was reported to be non-functional after a February Israeli raid.

Israeli soldiers entered the hospital on 15 February 2024 from the south; according to a spokesman for the Gaza Health Ministry they destroyed tents and bulldozed a mass grave. Israel stated it exhumed and examined some 400 corpses looking for Israeli hostages. (Note: On 7 March, Israel returned the corpses of 47 people whose bodies had been removed from the grave.)

Due to power outages during the entry of Israeli soldiers into the hospital, five patients in the hospital died. On 18 February, the World Health Organization said the hospital could no longer serve its patients, and that the hospital was no longer functional. Tedros Adhanom Ghebreyesus attributed the hospital's inability to continue operating to the Israeli siege and raid.

== Allegations of desecration ==
Palestine Health Ministry spokesman Ashraf al-Qudra claimed that dozens of bodies exhumed from mass graves had been beheaded and their organs and skins removed from mass graves at Nasser Hospital.

According to paramedics and rescue teams involved in the recovery of the bodies, some bodies were found with hands tied, indicating possible execution. Other victims were found with bullet marks on their heads, raising suspicions of summary executions. There are also reports of torture marks on the bodies.

According to Palestinian government–run news agency Wafa, some bodies were found suspicious of organ theft with their stomachs open and stitched up, contrary to the usual wound closure techniques in the Gaza Strip. The mutilated body of a little girl wearing a surgical gown was also found, prompting suspicions that she had been buried alive.

== List of graves ==
By January 2024, many hospital courtyards had been converted to mass graves; according to Euro-Med HRM by December 2023 there were more than 120 mass graves within the strip.

=== Nasser Medical Complex ===
According to reports from January and February 2024, staff and civilians at the Nasser Hospital "had felt compelled" to bury casualties in the hospital courtyard due to a lack of access to cemeteries because of fighting.

In April 2024, following the withdrawal of Israeli forces, over 300 bodies of young men, women, and children were unearthed at the Nasser Medical Complex in Khan Younis, Gaza, after Israeli military withdrawal. According to Colonel Yamen Abu Suleiman the bodies exhibited signs of having been bound and potentially executed in the field. Reports indicate that two other mass graves have been identified, but have yet to be excavated.

According to a report by France24, based on analysis of photographs and video, the location of the exhumations is around the same area as the earlier mass burials, but there is no way to verify how many bodies were buried there prior to the Israeli withdrawal in April 2024. GeoConfirmed presented a similar analysis, saying that the exhumations took place at the same location as the earlier mass burials conducted by Palestinians, although they didn't exclude the possibility that the graves had been added to by Israeli forces.

=== Al-Shifa Hospital ===
On 14 November 2023, officials at Al-Shifa hospital announced that to date they had buried 179 bodies in a mass grave in the courtyard of the hospital. A week later, Palestinians buried dozens of unidentified bodies taken from Al-Shifa hospital and the Indonesian hospital in a mass grave in Khan Yunis.

In April 2024, health workers in Gaza exhumed the first bodies from mass graves at Al-Shifa Hospital in Gaza City, where, according to a Gaza Civil Defense spokesperson, at least 381 bodies were found after the withdrawal of Israeli forces, not including persons buried within the hospital grounds. The Office of the United Nations High Commissioner for Human Rights (OHCHR), stated that "Among the deceased were allegedly older people, women, and the wounded, while others were found tied and stripped of their clothes."

On 8 May, the Gaza Media Office stated a third mass grave had been found at al-Shifa, with some of the bodies found without heads, raising concerns about possible war crimes. In a statement, the director of the Gaza Emergency Operations Centre said, "The bodies we found were on beds at the reception and emergency department, meaning Israel destroyed the department over the heads of sick and injured people – and they were buried alive."

=== Beit Lahiya ===
A mass grave has been discovered on the grounds of a school in Beit Lahiya, in the northern Gaza Strip. The bodies of 30 Palestinians were reportedly found in body bags, blindfolded and their hands tied behind their backs. The Palestinian Prisoners' Club has confirmed the discovery and indicated that the victims were under detention, suggesting they were executed in the field. The victims' identities, circumstances and dates of death are unknown.

=== Other ===
In Deir al-Balah at least fifty people were buried in a mass grave; the mayor said "We bury our dead in mass graves. Our graves no longer accommodate the large number of martyrs." According to Jacobin, over 120 bodies were discovered in mass graves in the Jabalia refugee camp.

Another mass grave buried in a mound of sand was discovered in the southern Rafah area on 30 March 2025, containing the corpses of 15 rescue workers who had been killed by the IDF eight days earlier. According to United Nations officials, the dead included eight Red Crescent workers, six members of the Palestinian Civil Defense and a staffer from UNRWA. On Twitter, UN aid chief Tom Fletcher stated the workers were killed by the IDF while attempting to save civilians. A Red Crescent official stated there was evidence at least one person being detained and killed, as one of the corpses was discovered with his hands tied.

== Investigation ==
The United Nations called for "clear, transparent and credible investigations" into the mass graves. Volker Türk emphasized that hospitals are entitled to very special protection under international humanitarian law. He also stated that the deliberate killing of civilians, prisoners, and others who are hors de combat (unable to participate in combat) is a war crime. The United Nations has also called for the preservation of forensic evidence of Gaza's mass graves. The European Union also called for an independent investigation, stating, "This is something that forces us to call for an independent investigation... because indeed it creates the impression that there might have been violations of international human rights committed". The U.S. National Security Advisor stated, "We want to see this thoroughly and transparently investigated." In June 2024, Medical Aid for Palestinians released a statement saying it was "deeply concerned" that no international investigators had been allowed into Gaza.

== Reactions ==
The Israeli Defence Forces said the accusations of them causing the killings were "baseless and unfounded." The IDF said that during its operation "in the area of Nasser Hospital, in accordance to the effort to locate hostages and missing persons, corpses buried by Palestinians in the area of Nasser Hospital were examined." They further stated that "Bodies examined, which did not belong to Israeli hostages, were returned to their place." Sky News published an analysis of satellite imagery and social media footage of mass graves dug by Palestinians during Israel's siege, which were later bulldozed by the IDF.

Hamas has criticized the international community for its silence after the discovery of mass graves in Gaza. They called the findings evidence of "Zionist fascism" and war crimes. Hamas demanded that international institutions hold Israel accountable.

=== Countries ===
- China: Referring to the graves found at al-Shifa, Chinese Foreign Ministry spokesperson Lin Jian stated China was "deeply shocked and strongly condemns the perpetrators of this atrocity".
- Egypt: The Egyptian Foreign Ministry said that "it is sad and shameful that violations of international law and human values continue in this way in the 21st century, in full view and hearing of all countries, international organizations and the Security Council." Egypt also said it condemned violations of international law, including the targeting of civilians, displaced persons and medical teams by Israeli forces.
- France: France has called for an independent investigation into mass graves discovered in Gaza. The French foreign ministry said: "Given the total humanitarian emergency in Gaza, where the civilian situation has long been unacceptable, France calls for an immediate and lasting ceasefire, the only thing that will protect the civilian population, and the massive influx of humanitarian aid through all access points to the Gaza Strip."
- Germany: Germany has called for an investigation into media reports on the discovery of mass graves.
- Iran: The spokesman of the Iranian Foreign Ministry, Nasser Kanani, has described this massacre as horrific and heartbreaking. Emphasizing that international humanitarian law, particularly the 1949 Geneva Conventions, supports medical centers and hospitals, he said, adding that damning evidence shows that the Israeli government and Zionists are responsible for the atrocities committed in this crime. Iran's ambassador to Geneva and permanent representative to international organizations, Ali Bahreini, has also called for an immediate end to crimes in the Gaza enclave in response to the discovery of mass graves.
- Jordan: Jordanian Foreign Ministry spokesman Sufyan Qudah reiterated the kingdom's condemnation of Israeli actions and crimes, adding that these actions are not only a violation of international law and humanitarian law, but also war crimes.
- Pakistan: Pakistan has joined the United Nations in demanding a "transparent and credible" investigation into the discovery of mass graves at two major Gaza hospitals. A Foreign Office spokesman said, "There must be an independent and impartial investigation to establish the facts, determine responsibility and punish those responsible for war crimes and crimes against humanity in Gaza. We call on the international community, particularly calls on Israel's supporters to take immediate action to end the war on the people of Gaza, to protect civilians and to hold the perpetrators of the Gaza genocide accountable."
- Palestine: Palestinian officials have called for an international investigation after a mass grave of people who were blindfolded and handcuffed was found in Gaza. The Palestinian Foreign Ministry called for an international investigation into what it described as an Israeli massacre, and demanded that a team visit Gaza to find out "the reality and extent of this genocide to which our people are being exposed".
- Saudi Arabia: Saudi Arabia has condemned Israeli war crimes in the Gaza Strip. The kingdom's foreign ministry emphasized that the international community's failure to hold Israel accountable for its violations of international law will only lead to more violations and an increase in humanitarian tragedies and destruction.
- South Africa: South Africa's Department of International Relations and Cooperation (DIRCO) has expressed its deep concern and shock at the discovery of the mass grave, describing the discovery as appalling.
- United States: The US State Department has expressed concern over mass graves. Spokesman Matthew Miller said the US was inquiring with Israel about the reports. The US has asked Israel about reports of mass graves. The White House has also described reports of mass graves in Gaza as 'deeply troubling'. US officials have spoken to their Israeli counterparts to learn more about the reports.
- Houthis: Following the discovery of the mass graves, Yemen's Houthi group urged its forces to step up its operations against Israeli-linked vessels in the Red Sea, Arabian Sea and Indian Ocean. The Houthi group emphasized the continuous stand of the Yemeni people in support of the Palestinian people and their heroic resistance in Gaza.
- (Scotland) The Scottish National Party's deputy Westminster leader, Mhairi Black, has urged the UK government to condemn reports of mass graves in Gaza hospitals as war crimes. She reiterated her party's call for an end to arms sales to Israel during Prime Minister's Questions on Wednesday. Black likens the condemnation of mass graves in Ukraine as war crimes to the failure to do so so far in this case. She told the Commons: "When mass graves were discovered in Ukraine two years ago, this House was united in condemnation and considered the graves to be evidence of war crimes, for which Russia must respond. Yesterday, Palestinian authorities in Gaza Covering up mass graves outside bombed hospitals is also considered a war crime, isn't it?" In response to Black, Deputy Prime Minister Oliver Dowden said Israel was expected to investigate any allegations of misconduct. Dowden continued to urge the Israeli government to investigate any allegations of misconduct.

=== International organizations ===
- United Nations rights chief Volker Türk said that he was "horrified" by the site and called for an international investigation. The U.N. High Commissioner for Human Rights said the attack indicated "serious violations of international human rights law and international humanitarian law." The United Nations has also called for the preservation of forensic evidence of Gaza's mass graves. The UN human rights chief while expressing his horror at the destruction of Nasir and al-Shifa hospitals and reports of mass graves also demanded an independent investigation into the killings.
- The European Union (EU) has backed a UN call for an independent investigation into the alleged discovery of mass graves. European Union spokesman Peter Stano said the situation "forces us to call for an independent investigation of all suspicions and all circumstances, because it gives the impression that international human rights may have been violated".
- The Organization of Islamic Cooperation (OIC) has condemned Israel's "continuous and tragic massacre" of Palestinians following the discovery of mass graves. The OIC said it called the discovery of the mass grave "a war crime, a crime against humanity, and organized state terrorism that requires investigation, accountability and sanction under international criminal law".
- The Arab League will hold an emergency meeting to discuss Israel's deadly attack on the Gaza Strip. The meeting will discuss Israel's ongoing genocidal war, the discovery of mass graves in Gaza and the US veto against the Palestinian bid for full UN membership.
- Amnesty International has called for immediate access to the Gaza Strip for human rights investigators following the discovery of mass graves. Erika Guevara Rosas, Amnesty International's senior director, stressed the need to preserve these sites for forensic evidence and identification of remains. He highlighted ICJ orders for Israel to preserve evidence to prevent genocide and urged third states to pressure Israel to allow independent investigators and forensic experts into Gaza.
- The International Rescue Committee (IRC) has called for an immediate international and independent investigation into the reports of mass graves. Bob Kitchen, Vice President of Emergencies at the IRC, expressed deep concern at the reports and said, "We are horrified at the news of hundreds of bodies buried in mass graves at health facilities in Gaza. Some of the deceased were allegedly elderly, women, and wounded individuals — with some found with their hands tied and stripped of their clothes. We echo the UN High Commissioner for Human Rights' demand for an immediate and thorough independent investigation into these incidents."

== See also ==
- Nasser Hospital mass graves
- Mass graves in the Sinai Peninsula
- Mass grave
- Summary execution
