= The Reservists (organization) =

Israeli non-government organization

- המילואימניקים – דור הניצחון
- Founder: Major (res.) Gilad Ach; Capt. (res.) Omer Pacinias-Waldman; Lieutenant Colonel (res.) Itamar Eitam; Major (res.) Michael Lobovikov; Major General Menachem Kalmanzon
- Website: www.miluimnikim.org.il

The Israeli Reservists - Generation of Victory is a grassroots movement formed by a group of Israeli reservist soldiers, both men and women, who were called up during the Gaza War, which followed the October 7 attacks. The movement states that its goal is to achieve a decisive military outcome in the conflict in Gaza, Israel’s northern border, and the West Bank. It also advocates for policies that, in its view, would enhance Israel’s long-term security and deterrence.

== Background ==
Following the outbreak of the Gaza war, the Israeli government made several decisions, such as permitting humanitarian aid into Gaza and redeploying troops from certain areas. These moves, along with discussions of a ceasefire and hostage exchange, led some soldiers and reservists to call for a different approach.

In response, in January 2024, The Israeli Reservists established three protest encampments in central locations: near the Israeli government offices in Jerusalem, outside the IDF headquarters in Tel Aviv, and at the Re'im parking lot near the Gaza border. The protests called for clear military objectives and a stronger stance against Hamas. Initially named "The Encampment of the Reservists," the movement later rebranded itself as "The Israeli Reservists - Generation of Victory" as it expanded its activities.

Since its formation, the movement has engaged in media advocacy, public demonstrations, political lobbying, and direct engagement with soldiers.

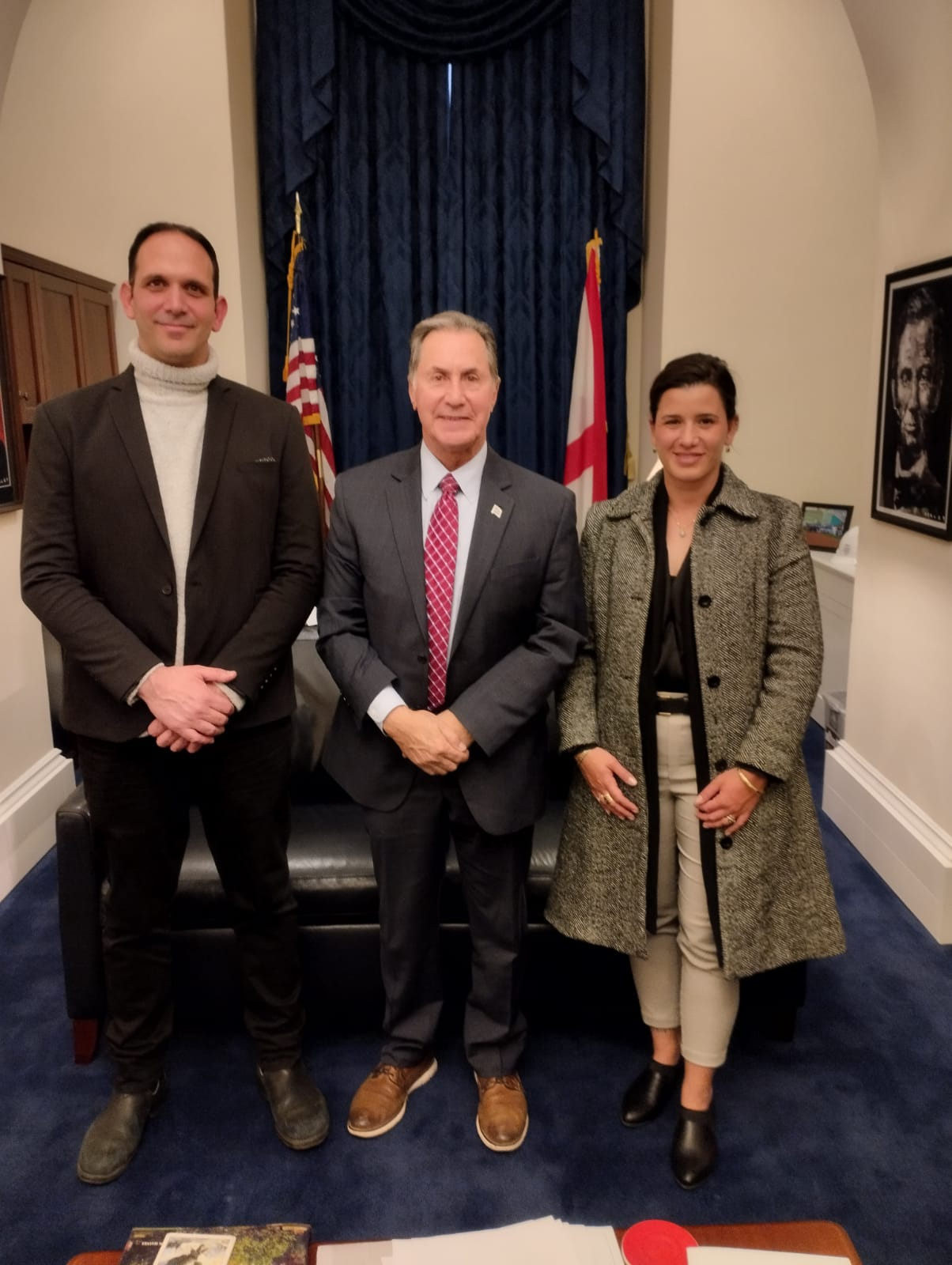
Movement members with Congressman Gary Palmer

== The movement ==
The movement supports a military strategy based on several principles:

1. Territorial Security Measures: Advocating for the establishment of a buffer zone in southern Lebanon and the annexation of northern parts of the Gaza Strip, which it argues would enhance Israel’s security.
2. Voluntary Emigration: Supporting policies that facilitate the emigration of Gaza’s civilian population to other countries as a means of reducing Hamas' influence.
3. Territorial Security Measures: Advocating for the establishment of a buffer zone in southern Lebanon and the annexation of northern parts of the Gaza Strip, which it argues would enhance Israel’s security.
4. Defeating Hamas: Calling for the dismantling of Hamas' military and political infrastructure, as well as efforts to disrupt financial and logistical support for the group.
5. Conditional Humanitarian Aid: Advocating for restricting aid to Gaza unless hostages are released and ensuring it does not benefit Hamas.
6. Reevaluating UNRWA’s Role: The movement argues that UNRWA has alleged ties to Hamas and calls for reassessing its operations, with the possibility of ceasing its activities in Israel and Gaza.
7. Holding Lebanon Accountable: Maintaining that the Lebanese government bears responsibility for attacks from its territory, and supporting military responses targeting Hezbollah and Lebanese infrastructure if hostilities persist.
8. Exclusive Military Control: Recommending that only the IDF and Israeli Police maintain armed authority between the Jordan River and the Mediterranean, a policy that would impact Palestinian security forces.

== Activities ==
In February 2024, the movement organized a rally attended by approximately 15,000 people in front of the Israeli government offices. Hostage families and bereaved families participated. The event concluded the "Victory March," a procession of reservists and civilians from Zikim, near Gaza, to the Knesset in Jerusalem.

In March 2024, members of the movement staged demonstrations outside UNRWA offices in Jerusalem, alleging that the organization had ties to Hamas. The protests included symbolic displays and slogans calling for an investigation into UNRWA’s activities. A formal complaint was also submitted to Israeli authorities.

Later, in December 2024, UNRWA announced the cessation of its operations in Israel and Gaza following increasing international pressure and various investigations into its conduct. The movement viewed this as a significant achievement in its efforts to ensure stricter oversight of humanitarian aid. However, international organizations and UNRWA itself stated that the decision resulted from broader factors, including policies of donor countries and actions taken by the Israeli government.

Delegations from the movement traveled to Washington, D.C., in March and December 2024, meeting with approximately 40 members of Congress, including Speaker of the House Mike Johnson and other lawmakers. Discussions focused on securing American support for Israel’s security strategy and maintaining strong U.S.-Israel relations.

In collaboration with MK Ariel Kallner, the movement supported legislation prioritizing reservists in university admissions and housing. The law, passed in March 2024, aims to recognize the contributions of reservists to Israeli society.

In December 2024, the movement, in partnership with government agencies, launched an initiative encouraging reservists to settle in border regions they had defended during the war. This program aims to bolster security in areas near Gaza, the Galilee, the Jordan Valley, and the Negev.
