= Rachel Edri hostage stand-off =

2023 terror incident in Israel

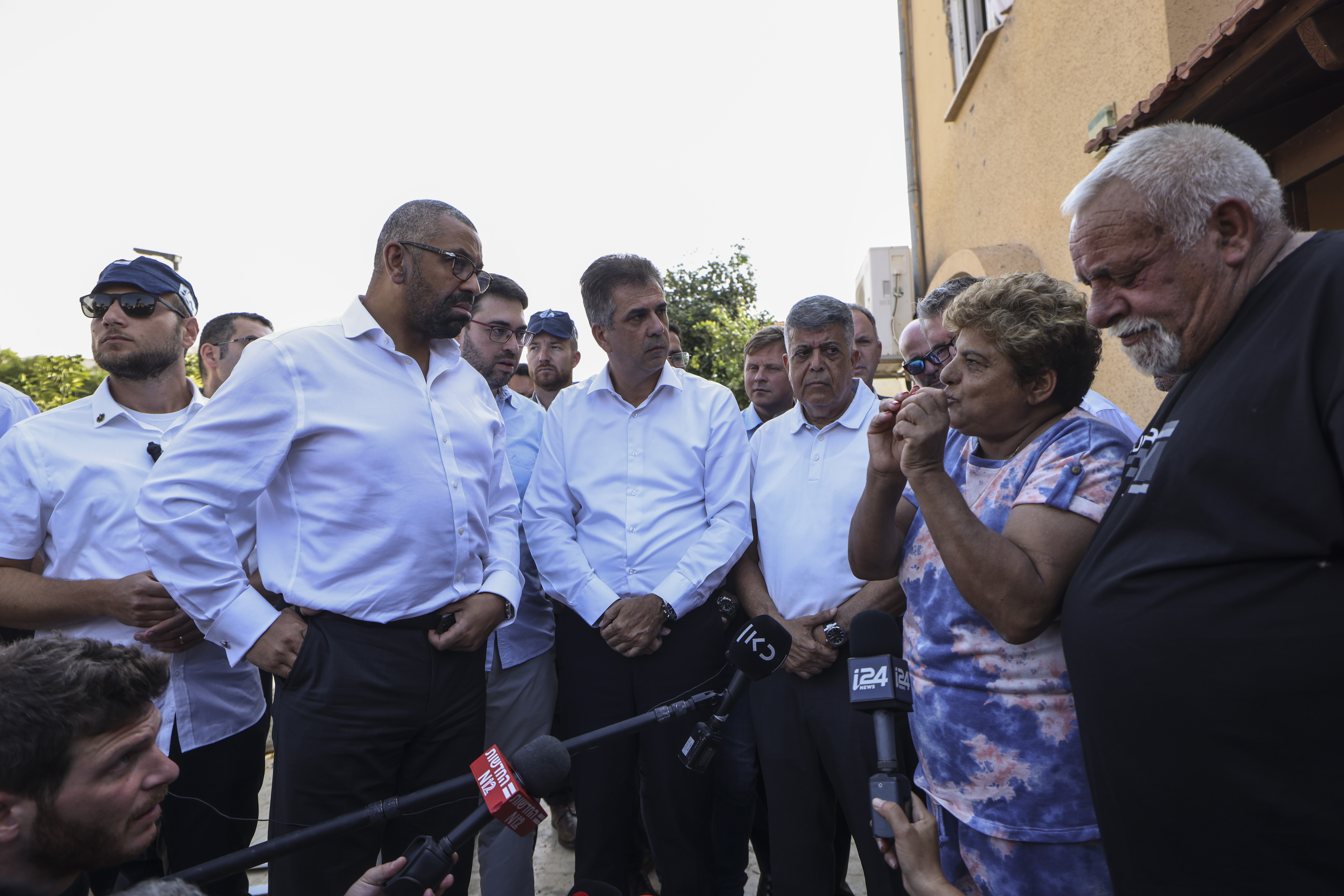
Rachel Edri (right, speaking into microphones) meeting with UK Foreign Secretary James Cleverly who came to visit her on 11 October 2023, 4 days after she was held hostage

On 7 October 2023, a couple in their 60s, Rachel Hebrew: רחל אדרי and David Edri דוד אדרי, were held captive in their home in Ofakim, Israel, by Hamas militants during a large-scale invasion from the Gaza Strip. The incident lasted for approximately 20 hours and ended with their successful rescue by Israeli security forces. Following the incident, Rachel Edri gained national fame and became a cultural icon in Israel, symbolizing resilience and courage in the face of adversity. Her image and story were widely circulated in the media, inspiring various forms of artistic expression and becoming a part of popular culture.

A painting of Rachel Edri by the artist Adi Yonatan Cohen in Haifa

== Background ==
At the time of the event, Rachel Edri had been working at the Tze'elim Army Base cafeteria for 42 years, and was affectionately called the "mother of the soldiers" for her love and devotion to the soldiers she was serving.

== Time as hostage ==
On 7 October Rachel Edri, and her husband David, were in their home in Ofakim, a town close to the Gaza Strip, when the attack began. Five Arabic speaking militants, who told Edri that their ages ranged from 25 to 40, broke into their home. Claiming to be the police, they quickly took control, breaking the couple's phones and questioning them while searching the house.

During the hostage stand-off, Rachel Edri reportedly sang Arabic songs to the hostage takers, engaged them in conversation, offering drinks and food, including Coke, water, and homemade cookies. Her efforts to maintain a calm demeanor and even joke with the captors are believed to be attempts to buy time and prevent violence until rescue forces could arrive. She also surreptitiously indicated to the police the number of militants holding them captive.

At 2:30 AM the following morning, Israeli security forces, including counterterrorism units, stormed Edri's apartment and successfully rescued her and her husband while killing all the hostage takers. Rachel's son, Eviatar, a police officer, who provided valuable information about the layout of the house, played a crucial role in the planning of the rescue operation.

== Aftermath and cultural impact ==
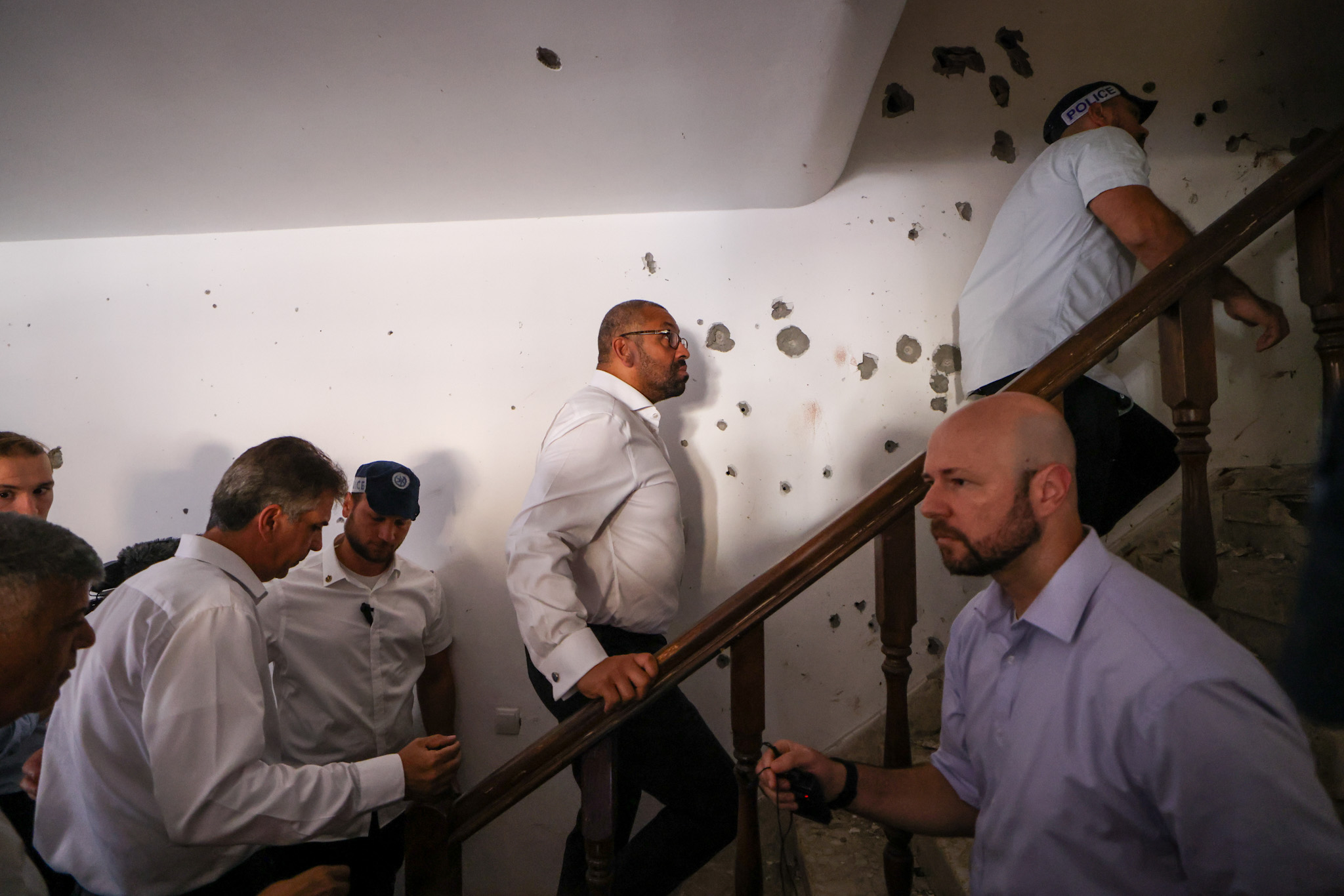
UK Foreign Secretary James Cleverly (center) climbing up the stairs at Edri 's apartment building. Behind him, Israel's Foreign Minister Eli Cohen. October 11, 2023

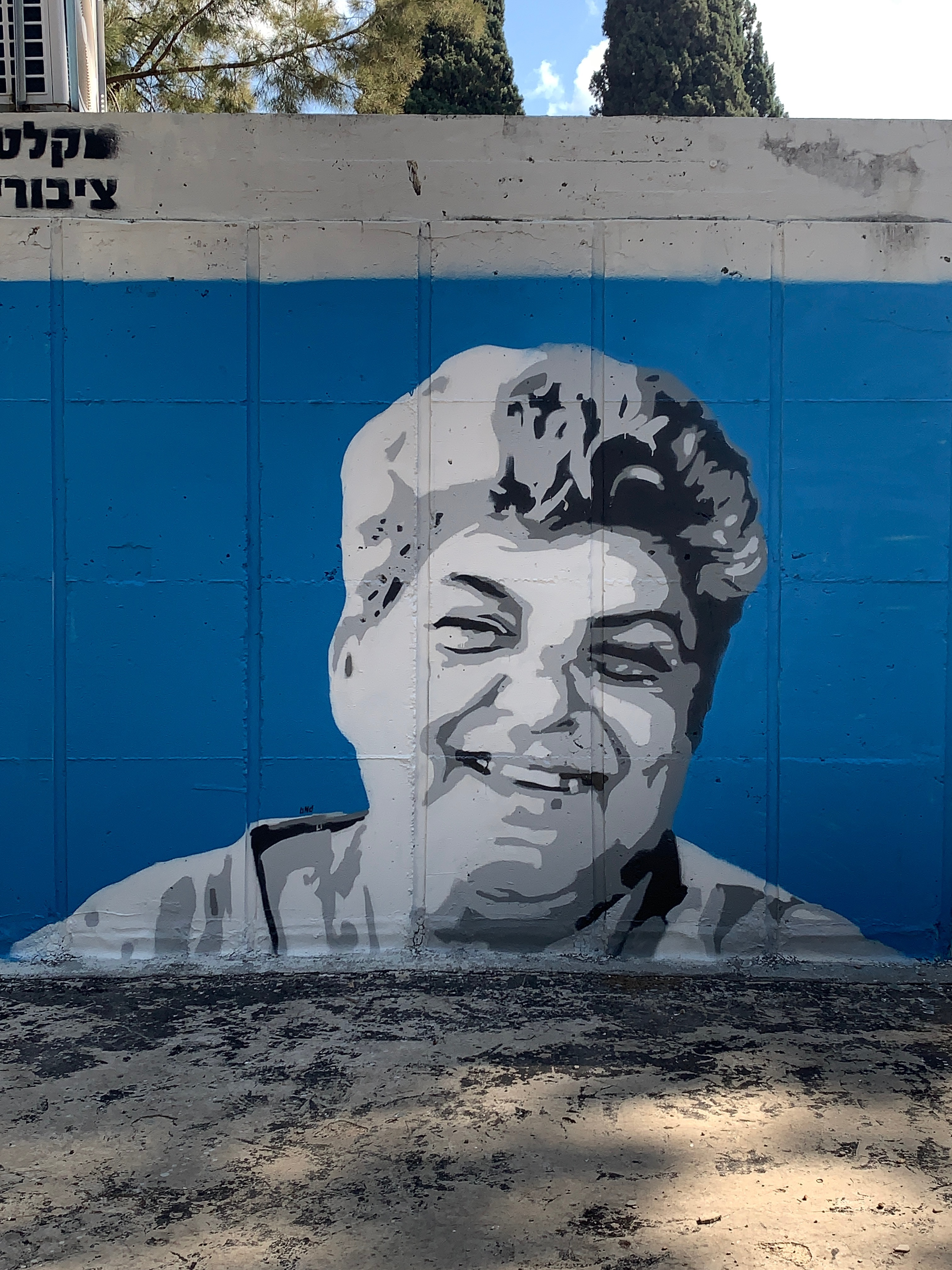
Street art of Rachel Edri in Haifa, Israel

A different street art of Rachel Edri
- Click here for image

The incident had a significant impact on Israeli society and culture. Rachel Edri, dubbed "Rachel from Ofakim," became a symbol of resilience and courage under pressure. Her story was widely covered in the media, and she became a pop culture icon in Israel. Her image was featured on various items, including T-shirts, and she was portrayed in art and memes, reflecting her status as a symbol of resistance and survival. This transformation into a pop icon was rapid and reflected the broader societal processing of the traumatic events. Israelis have drawn parallels between Edri and the biblical figure Yael, who famously defeated a wicked general by first giving him food and then taking his life while he slept.

Rachel was invited to recount her experience in various high-profile meetings, including one with US President Joe Biden during his visit to Tel Aviv. Four days after the hostage stand-off, UK Foreign Secretary James Cleverly, flanked by Israel's Foreign Minister Eli Cohen personally came to visit Edri at her home.

Edri was selected as one of thirty five torch lighters at the 2025 Israeli Independence Day Torch-lighting Ceremony. Although the ceremony was cancelled due to the 2025 Israel–West Bank fires, Edri participated in a dress rehearsal of the ceremony which was broadcast on Israeli Television.

== See also ==
- Gaza war hostage crisis
- Women in the Gaza war
