= Eloise =

Eloise may refer to:

- Eloise (given name)

== Places ==
- Éloise, a commune in south-eastern France
- Lake Eloise, Florida, United States

== Film and television ==
- Eloïse's Lover, a 2009 Spanish film released domestically as Eloïse
- Eloise (2016 film), an American thriller
- Eloise: The Animated Series, a 2006 animated TV comedy series
- "Eloise" (The Sopranos), an episode of the TV series The Sopranos
- "Eloise" (Playhouse 90), a 1956 television play on the series Playhouse 90
- Eloise Hawking, a character on the TV series Lost

== Literature ==
- Eloise (books), a 1950s book series by Kay Thompson
  - Eloise (1955 book), the first of the Eloise series of children's books
- Eloise Drew, a character in the Nancy Drew mystery series

== Music ==
- Eloise of Lord T & Eloise, a crunk rap group from Memphis, Tennessee
- Eloise (album), a 1993 album by Arvingarna
- "Eloise" (Arvingarna song), 1993
- Eloise, an opera by Karl Jenkins
- "Eloise" (Paul Ryan song), 1968, composed by Paul Ryan and sung by his twin brother Barry
- "Eloise", a song by Kay Thompson in 1965

== Other uses ==
- Hurricane Eloise, a 1975 Atlantic hurricane
- Cyclone Eloise, a tropical cyclone that caused moderate damage in Mozambique.
- Eloise (psychiatric hospital), Wayne County, Michigan, United States
  - Eloise Cemetery
- Eloise Copper Mine, eastern Australia

== See also ==
- Sweet Eloise, a US Air Force B-29 bomber, see List of surviving B-29 Superfortresses
- Heloise (disambiguation)
