= Helvis =

Helvis is a feminine given name. Notable people with the name include:

- Helvis of Ramla (c. 1122–c. 1158), lady of Ramla
- Helvis de Milly (born before 1164), lady of Bethsan, daughter of Henry of Milly
- Helvis of Ibelin (c. 1180–c. 1215), daughter of Balian of Ibelin
- Helvis of Cyprus (c. 1190–c. 1218), daughter of King Aimery of Jerusalem and Cyprus
- Helvis of Brienne, abbess, daughter of Erard of Brienne-Ramerupt
- Helvis of Nephin, first wife of John, Old Lord of Beirut
- Helvis of Haifa (died 1264), wife of John of Valenciennes
- Helvis of Brunswick-Grubenhagen (1353–1421), queen consort of Cyprus and Armenia

== See also ==
- Helvise (disambiguation)
- Heloise (disambiguation)
- Hawise (disambiguation)
