= Heloise (disambiguation) =

Héloïse (1100?–1164) was a French writer, philosopher and abbess and wife of Peter Abelard.

Heloise may also refer to:

== People ==
- Héloïse Colin (1819–1873), French painter and fashion illustrator
- Heloise Bowles Cruse (1919–1977), American advice columnist, the original author of "Hints from Heloise"
- Heloïse Denner, South African politician and attorney
- Heloise Ruth First (1925–1982), South African anti-apartheid activist killed by the police
- Héloïse Guérin (born 1989), French fashion model
- Heloise Hersey (1855–1933), American scholar of Anglo-Saxon language and literature
- Heloise McCeney (1876–?), American vaudeville performer known as the Parisian Dancer
- Héloïse Durant Rose (c. 1853 – 1943), American poet, playwright and critic
- Heloise Williams, lead singer of New York punk band Heloise and the Savoir Faire
- Laurent Héloïse (born 1985), French football player
- Heloise (columnist), pen name of Kiah Michelle Cruse (born 1951), American advice columnist, daughter of the original "Hints from Heloise" author

== Fictional characters ==
- Heloise (Jimmy Two-Shoes), a character on Canadian animated children's TV series Jimmy Two-Shoes

== See also ==
- Eloise (disambiguation)
- Hawise (disambiguation)
- Helvise (disambiguation)
