= Israeli razing of cemeteries and necroviolence against Palestinians =

During the Gaza war and genocide, at least 16 cemeteries in the Gaza Strip were reported to have been damaged or destroyed by Israeli forces, according to investigations by CNN, the New York Times and Euro-Med Human Rights Monitor. The Israel Defense Forces (IDF) stated that some cemetery disturbances were carried out as part of military operations, including searches for the bodies of Israeli hostages based on intelligence reports, such as the body of the last remaining hostage, Ran Gvili.

Some reports indicate incidents of necroviolence affecting Palestinians corpses in the West Bank and Gaza Strip. These include desecration or destruction of graves, withholding of bodies from families to prevent traditional mourning, and the use of numbered graves without personal identifiers, practices which have been described as dehumanizing.

== Razing of cemeteries in the Gaza Strip ==
Israel has conducted a number of activities in cemeteries in Gaza, including establishing military bases and, according to the IDF, exhuming bodies for the purposes of attempting to locate the bodies of hostages; they conduct "precise hostage rescue operations in the specific locations where information indicates that the bodies of hostages may be located".

The intentional destruction of religious sites is a possible war crime if done without military necessity.

Part of Gaza Strip	Neighbor- hood	Cemetery (مقبرة) name	Alleged incident reported in: 1. NYT 2023-12-14, 2. Euromed 2024-01-07, 3. CNN 2024-01-20				
Part of Gaza Strip	Neighbor- hood	Cemetery (مقبرة) name	Date(s)	Description	1	2	3
Gaza City غَزَّة	City Center near Al-Shifa Hospital	Al-Baṭsh البطش	Early Jan. 2024	Israeli forces leveled the cemetery and a majority of the bodies were "removed, dismembered, and looted, along with some of the tombstones".		x	
Gaza City غَزَّة	Shajaiye الشجاعية	Tunisian Cemetery map مقبرة التوانسي		Israeli forces razed part of the cemetery, raised berms and parked armored vehicles behind the berms.	x		
Gaza City غَزَّة	Shajaiye الشجاعية	Unspecified, "smaller than Tunisian" (Shajā‛iye Cemetery ? مقبرة الشجاعية)		Israeli military vehicles destroyed dozens of graves	x		x
Gaza City غَزَّة	Sheikh Ijlin الشيخ عجلين	Sheikh Ijlin الشيخ عجلين		Razing	x		x
Gaza City غَزَّة	Sheikh Radwan الشيخ رضوان	Sheikh Radwan الشيخ رضوان				x	
Gaza City غَزَّة	Palestine Square ميدان فلسطين a.k.a. Al-Saha (As-Saha) الساحة	Sheikh Shaaban لشيخ شعبان	17–20 or 21 Dec. 2023	Bulldozers destroyed cemetery. Included trampling of corpses.		x	
Gaza City غَزَّة	Zaytun, Old City الزيتون	St. Porphyrius Church كَنِيسَة الْقِدِّيس بُرْفِيرْيُوس				x	
Gaza City غَزَّة	Tuffah التفاح	Tuffah التفاح	Days prior to 6 Jan. 2024	Israeli army exhumed bodies and smashed their graves.		x	x
Gaza City غَزَّة	Tuffah التفاح	Ali ibn Marwan Cemeterymap جامع ابن مروان				x	
Northern Gaza Strip	Jabalia جباليا	Al Falouja map مقبرة الفالوجا		Desecrated by Israeli military. Gravestones were destroyed, soil was upturned, treadmarks from tanks that rolled through.	x	x	x
Northern Gaza Strip	Beit Hanoun بيت حانون	Beit Hanoun بيت حانون			x		
Northern Gaza Strip	Beit Lahia بيت لاهيا	Shuhada شُهَدَاء		Razing	x		x
Central Gaza Strip	Bureij البريج	New Bureij مقبرة البريج الجديدة		Israeli army drove a tank with CNN reporters inside over a dirt road through the graveyard recently bulldozed by Israeli tanks. Graves were visible on either side of the newly-bulldozed dirt road.			x
Southern Gaza Strip	Khan Yunis خان يونس	Khan Yunis Central خان يونس		Israeli forces opened tombs and removed bodies, and severely damaged graves. The IDF acknowledged having exhumed bodies in its search for the bodies of Israeli hostages.			x
Southern Gaza Strip	Bani Suheila بني سهيلا	Bani Suheila بني سهيلا	2+ weeks Dec–Jan 2023–4	Deliberate and progressive bulldozing over two weeks, building defensive fortifications.		x	x

*Also transliterated Al-Faluja, Al-Fallujah, etc.

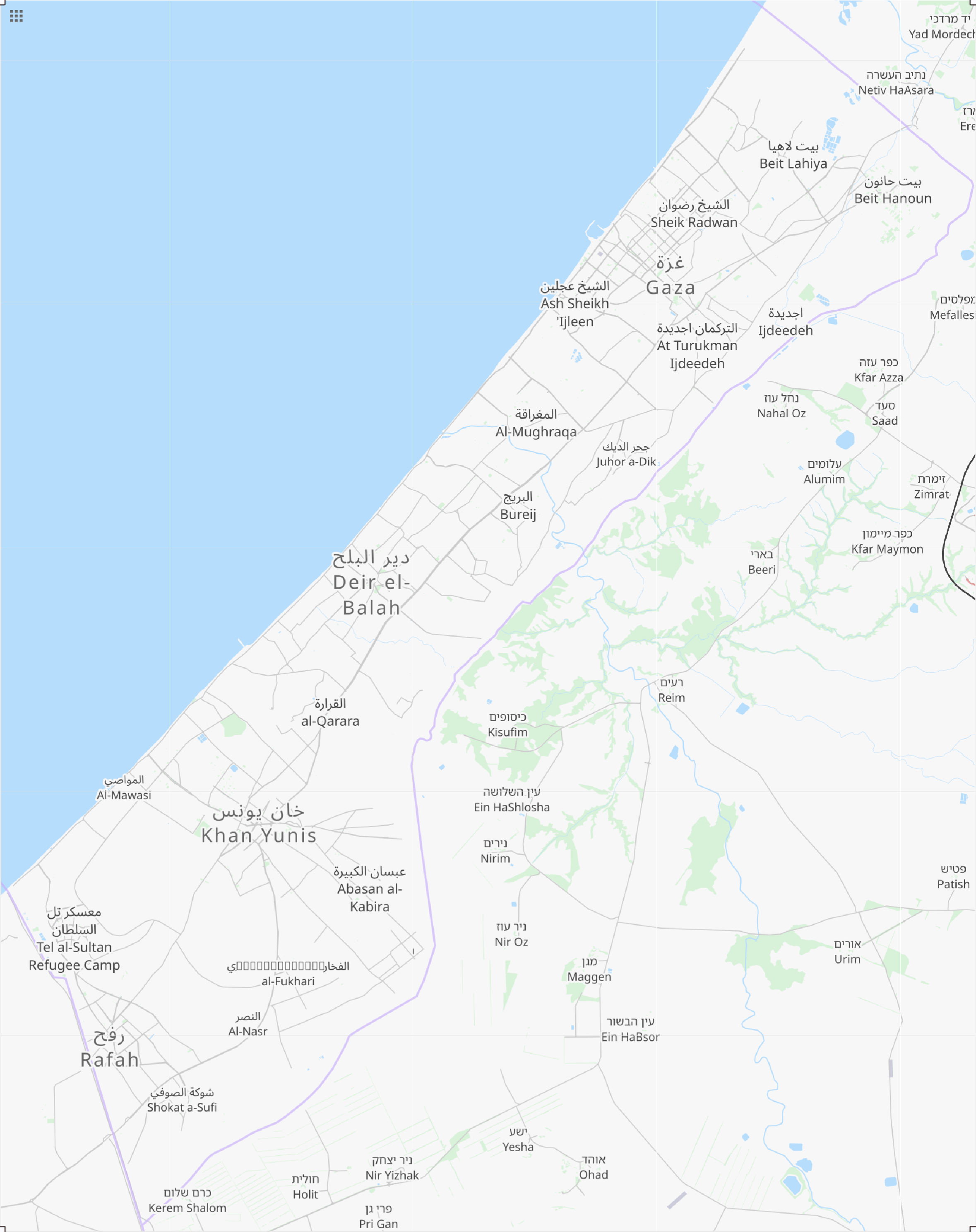
Damaged cemeteries in Gaza Strip. *approximate location

=== The New York Times report ===
In December 2023, The New York Times reported that Israeli forces razed six cemeteries in the Gaza Strip

- In Shajaiye, Gaza City, Israeli forces razed part of the Tunisian cemetery
- Israeli military vehicles destroyed dozens of graves at a smaller cemetery in Shajaiye
- Israeli forces damaged gravesites at the Al-Faluja cemetery
- Beit Hanoun cemetery also in northern Gaza
- Razing of a cemetery in Sheikh Ijlin, Gaza City
- Razing of a cemetery in Beit Lahia, northern Gaza Strip

Journalists from the New York Times Visual Investigations identified the destruction through the analysis of different sources, using satellite imagery and video. The Times asked the IDF for comment and received no response. The report noted that "The laws of armed conflict consider the intentional destruction of religious sites without military necessity a possible war crime"

=== Euro-Med Human Rights Monitor report ===
On January 16, 2024, Euro-Med Human Rights Monitor reported bulldozing and desecration of more Gaza cemeteries than the Times did (up to 12, but lists 9). It also reported large holes have been created in cemeteries as a result of frequent Israeli attacks, engulfing dozens of graves, and the remains of some dead bodies have been scattered or have disappeared. In addition, the organization reported that graves were dug up and corpses stolen in Al-Faluga cemetery of Palestinian activists.

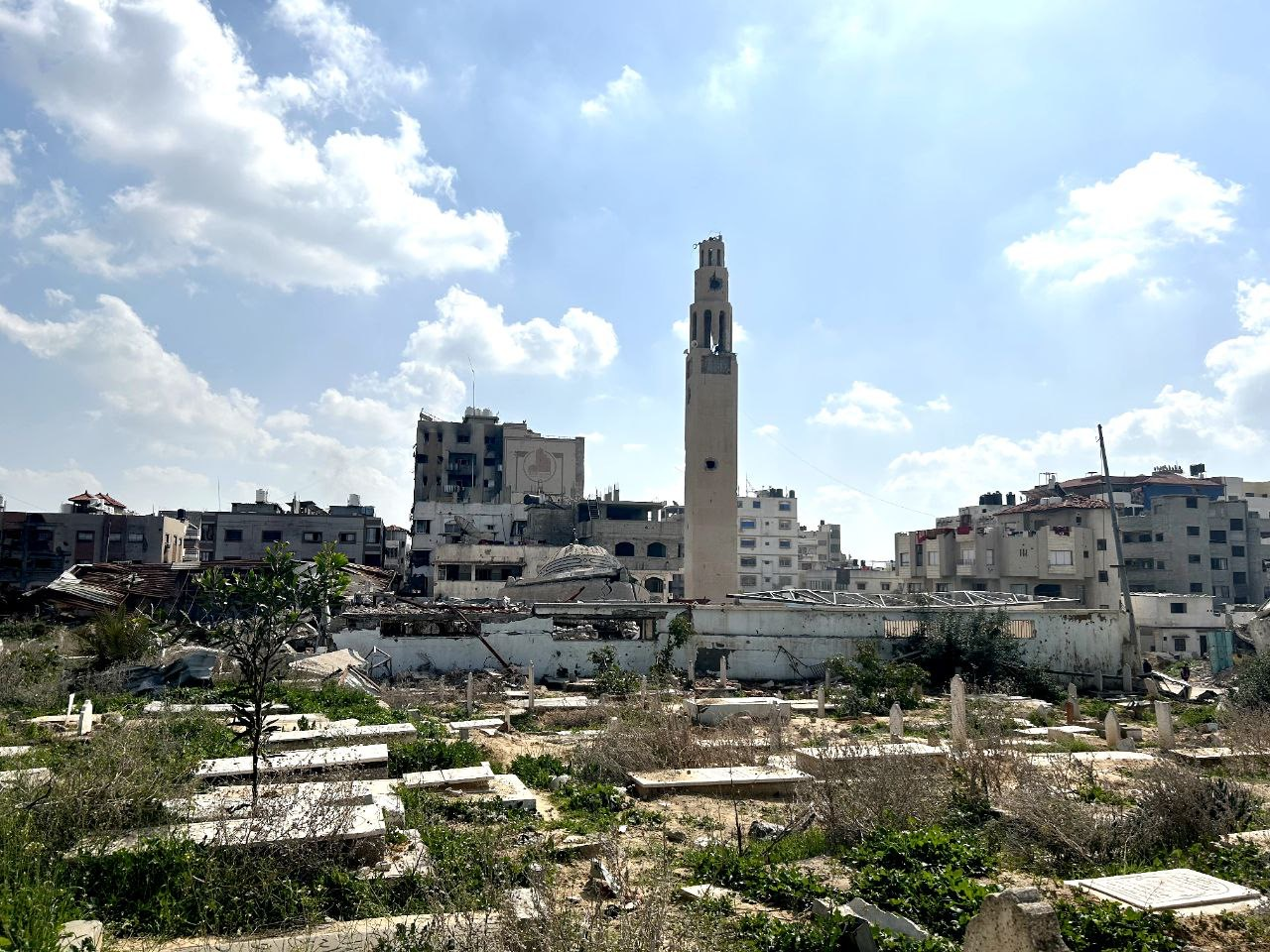
Euro-Med Monitor documented extensive damage across local cemeteries, including Sheikh Radwan.

Rami Abdu, the director of Euro-Med Monitor, alleges the desecration of the Al-Tuffah graveyard by the Israeli Army, stating that Israeli bulldozers ruthlessly dug and destroyed the cemetery. The Palestinian government in Gaza condemned the Israeli Army for disturbing 1,100 graves there as well as of pilfering 150 bodies, reporting that Israeli bulldozers leveled the cemetery, resulting in the desecration of the deceased, calling it a "heinous crime".

The cemeteries named include:

1. Al-Tuffah cemetery
2. Al-Batsh cemetery - The Al-Batsh Cemetery was established in October 2023 to bury unidentified people who were left in the Al-Shifa Hospital complex. Israeli forces leveled Al-Batsh in early January 2024 and a majority of the bodies were "removed, dismembered, and looted, along with some of the tombstones".
3. Sheikh Shaaban Cemetery in Palestine Square, Gaza City (17–20 December, which included trampling of corpses)
4. A cemetery 1.7 km (1.1 mi) east of central Khan Yunis on 20 December 2023
5. Al-Fallujah cemetery in the northern Gaza Strip
6. Ali bin Marwan
7. Sheikh Radwan cemetery
8. St. Porphyrius Church Cemetery in Gaza City
9. Al-Shuhada Cemetery in Beit Lahia, northern Gaza

=== Khan Yunis Central Cemetery ===
On 17 January 2024, only one day after the Euro-Med Human Rights Monitor report, NBC reported that earlier that week, Israeli troops severely damaged Khan Yunis Central Cemetery (31.348°N 34.293°E) near Nasser Hospital, bulldozing it over, crushing tombstones, damaging tombs, and exposing graves holding human remains in some of the burial plots. The IDF stated that the incident was part of a precise effort to locate and recover the bodies of hostages taken by Hamas. The IDF emphasized what it called its commitment to respectful treatment of the deceased, and said that it returns bodies not identified as hostages with dignity. Ramy Abdu, chairman of Euro-Med Human Rights Monitor, stated that the attack, considering previous Israeli assaults on Palestinian cemeteries, indicated that Israel "systematically violates the sanctity of the deceased and their graves". In another CNN report, Israel stated more explicitly that it was exhuming corpses in Gaza cemeteries to see if any corpses there were those of Israeli hostages.

=== CNN report of 16 cemeteries damaged ===
CNN reported on 20 January 2024 that a total of sixteen Gaza cemeteries had been damaged, publishing before and after photos of several and specifying seven in total:

1. Khan Yunis Central Cemetery
2. A cemetery in Shajaiya
3. Bani Suheila cemetery, east of Khan Yunis ("deliberate and progressive bulldozing, and the creation of defensive fortifications over the course of at least two weeks in late December and early January")
4. New Bureij cemetery in Al-Bureij, a Palestinian refugee camp in central Gaza ("graves were visible on either side of the newly-bulldozed dirt road")
5. Al Falouja cemetery in the Jabalya neighborhood, north of Gaza City
6. Al-Tuffah cemetery, east of Gaza City
7. A cemetery in Sheikh Ijlin neighborhood, Gaza City

At Al Falouja, Al-Tuffah, and Sheik Ijlin, CNN reported "destroyed tombstones and heavy tread marks pointed to heavily armored vehicles or tanks driving over graves".

In the report, co-director Janina Dill of the Oxford Institute for Law, Ethics and Armed Conflict stated that attacking or destroying cemeteries violates international law except under very limited circumstances where the cemetery itself is a military objective.

==== Israeli reaction and claims ====
The IDF did not initially clarify the reasons behind the extensive bulldozing of cemeteries or the presence of military vehicles in areas where graves had previously existed. The IDF said that they had no policy of transforming graveyards into military posts.

On 29 January 2024 the IDF claimed to discover a Hamas operation room in an underground tunnel which it claimed lay 20 metres (66 ft) beneath the Bani Suheila cemetery in Khan Yunis. The Israeli military permitted CNN to visit the cemetery and surroundings, but did not allow CNN to see the alleged tunnel. The IDF only permitted CNN entrance to a tunnel outside the cemetery perimeter. CNN was unable to determine if the tunnel was located underneath the cemetery or not. The IDF claimed the destruction of the cemetery grounds was necessary in order to find and destroy the tunnel.

=== Ran Gvili exhumation ===
In January 2026, the Israeli military excavated approximately 250 graves in the Al-Batsh cemetery in order to find the body of Israeli policeman Ran Gvili. According to Al Jazeera, this effort involved the use of heavy machinery, destroyed tombstones, and led to "a significant alteration of the cemetery’s landscape".

=== Allied graves ===
According to a report from The Guardian, Israeli forces bulldozed a portion of the Gaza War Cemetery containing Allied forces killed in World War I and World War II. The impacted areas included sections containing mostly Australian forces from World War II and British forces from World War I. A plot for Canadian UN peacekeepers also appears to have been completely destroyed. An IDF spokesperson said both that the cemetery was an "active combat zone" and that "underground terrorist infrastructure was identified within the cemetery". The former caretaker of the cemetery said that it had been bulldozed "after the Israeli army withdrew from the area".

== Other Israeli necroviolence against Palestinians ==
=== In Gaza–Israel conflict ===
Israeli forces have been accused of necroviolence in 2020 in Gaza, including violently scooping up a corpse with a bulldozer. On 30 January 2024, the bodies of 100 people taken by Israeli forces were reburied in a mass grave in Rafah, with medical sources reporting some bodies had organs missing.

In 2019, the Israeli Supreme Court allowed the bodies of alleged Palestinian assailants to be withheld from their families, leading Defense for Children International to state Israeli authorities were violating international humanitarian law and international human rights law by confiscating the body of a 14-year-old Palestinian boy in the West Bank.

In February 2024, Emek Shaveh, an Israeli archaeologists NGO, stated that Orthodox Jews in West Jerusalem had taken over a Muslim shrine and vandalized Muslim graves. In March, an Israeli F-16 airstrike on a recently built cemetery in Jabalia resulted in human remains coming out of the soil and needing to be reburied. On 7 March, Israeli returned the corpses of 47 people whose bodies had been removed during the Nasser Hospital siege. On 9 March, Israeli settlers were recorded smashing and defacing gravestones at the Bab al-Rahma Cemetery in East Jerusalem. In April 2024, the Gaza Ministry of Endowments and Religious Affairs stated the IDF had mutilated corpses, including postmortem decapitations and dismemberment.

In September 2024, footage surfaced showing Israeli soldiers discarding the bodies of three deceased Palestinians from a rooftop during a raid in Qabatiya, located in the occupied West Bank near Jenin. Local reports indicated that at least seven people were killed during the operation, which involved Israeli forces surrounding a building. Witnesses described how four men tried to flee to the roof but were shot by snipers. After the violence subsided, soldiers were observed throwing the bodies over the edge, with a bulldozer later arriving to remove them.

On 25 September 2024, a truck carrying 88 unidentified bodies of Palestinians was sent through an Israeli-controlled border to Nasser Hospital in Khan Yunis. Zaher Al-Wahadi, head of the Palestinian Health Information Centre, noted that no details were provided about their identities or circumstances of death, marking the fifth instance of such unidentified bodies being received. The International Committee of the Red Cross highlighted that, according to international humanitarian law, individuals who die in armed conflicts should be treated with dignity, and their remains must be managed appropriately. The law requires that deceased individuals be searched for, collected, and evacuated from combat zones to help ensure that people do not go missing.

On 9 May 2026, armed Israeli settlers from the re-established settlement of Sa-Nur forced a Palestinian family in al-Asasa to exhume the body of 80-year-old Hussein Asasa shortly after his burial. Despite the family having pre-coordinated the funeral with the Israeli military, settlers began digging up the grave with hand tools, claiming its proximity to the settlement was unacceptable. Under threat from settlers armed with automatic rifles, the deceased’s sons were forced to personally disinter their father's remains and relocate them to a neighboring village. While the IDF stated it intervened to "prevent friction" and confiscate tools, the family reported that soldiers stood by during the forced exhumation. The UN Human Rights Office condemned the act as "appalling" and "emblematic of the dehumanisation of Palestinians" noting that such violence "spares no-one, dead or alive."

=== Ongoing Israeli necroviolence methods ===
Harvard anthropologist Randa May Wahbe describes Israeli necroviolence as a central component of Zionist colonialism, wherein the Israeli state uses control over Palestinian bodies and burial spaces to assert territorial sovereignty and enforce demographic dominance. Central to this framework is the withholding of fallen Palestinians in police morgues and freezers without issuing official death certificates, a practice that subjects bereaved families to "ambiguous loss" and indefinite mourning while attempting to suppress local public funerals. Wahbe details the use of the "cemeteries of numbers", which are closed military zones containing mass graves where deceased Palestinians are identified solely by numbered tags rather than names, and where shallow interments, missing records, and neglect strip the dead of their identity and dignity. She highlights the state-sanctioned desecration and secularization of historic Muslim burial sites in Jerusalem, such as the Mamilla and Bab al-Rahma cemeteries, where ancient graves have been cleared or built over for municipal projects, parks, and public facilities to erase Palestinian historical presence and remake the land's heritage. Wahbe also notes that withheld corpses are occasionally retained by state authorities as political leverage or bargaining chips to exchange for the remains of missing Israeli soldiers.

== See also ==
- Desecration of graves
- Destruction of cultural heritage during the Gaza war
- Ethnic cleansing
- Ethnic hatred
- Gaza genocide
- Gaza War Cemetery
- Gaza Strip mass graves
