= Sheikh Radwan =

Sheikh Radwan الشيخ رضوان
- Neighborhood
- Shaykh Ridwan
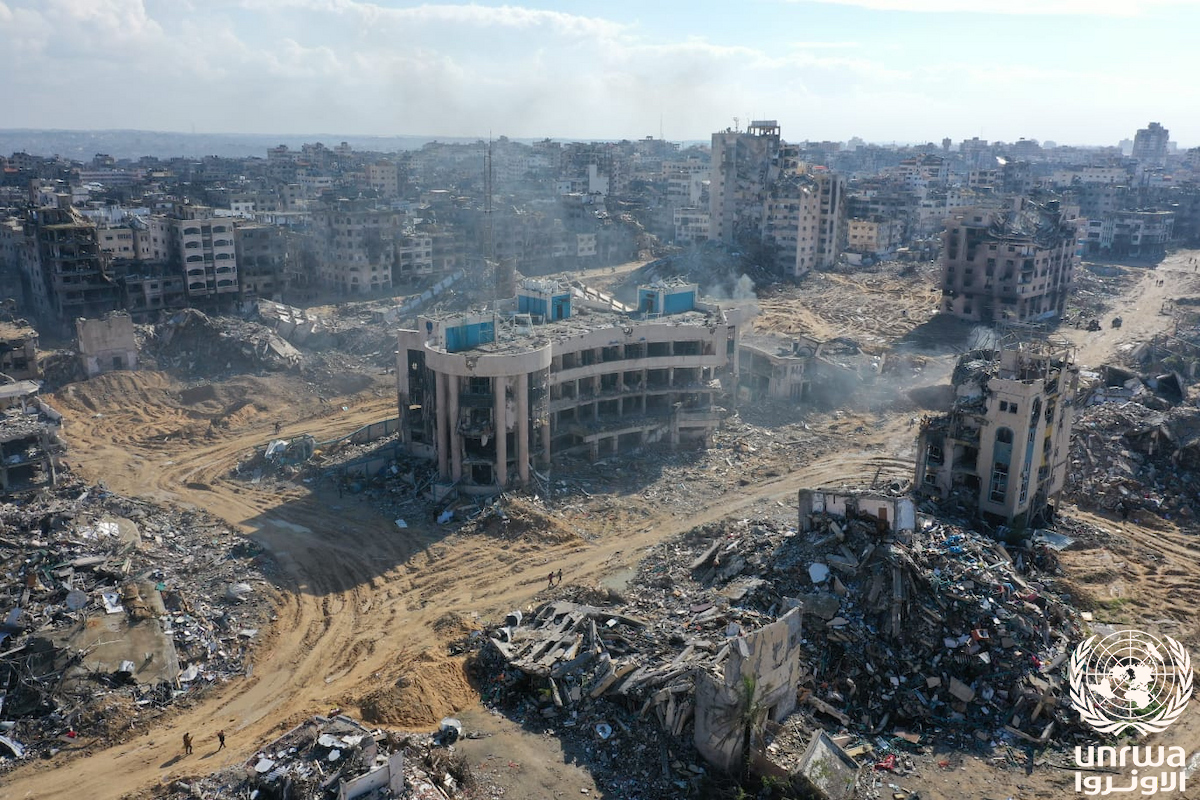
- Destruction caused by the Israeli army bombing in the Sheikh Radwan district, around UNRWA health center, February 2024
- Interactive map of Sheikh Radwan
- Location in Gaza Strip
- Coordinates: 31°32′10.67″N 34°27′56.98″E
- Country: Palestine
- Governorate: Gaza Governorate
- City: Gaza
- Time zone: UTC+2 (EET)
  - Summer (DST): +3

Sheikh Radwan (Arabic: الشيخ رضوان) is a district of Gaza City located nearly 3 kilometers (1.9 mi) northwest of the city center. It borders al-Shati camp to the southwest, Rimal to the south, and Jabalia to the east. The Sheikh Radwan Cemetery is located in the district. It contains hundreds of graves for Palestinians killed in the Israeli–Palestinian conflict, including Hamas leaders Ahmed Yassin, Abdel Aziz al-Rantissi, and Said Siam.

== History ==
The district is named after Sheikh Radwan whose mazar ("mausoleum") is situated on a hilltop in the district with an elevation of 65 meters (213 ft) above sea level. The mausoleum formerly served as a mosque, but is currently inactive. Its walls are constructed from ancient building stones and fragments of marble slabs in secondary use. In the 19th century, it was surrounded by ancient trees. The French explorer Victor Guérin who visited it in 1863, speculated that it could have been an ancient convent, and the gardens around it the remains of its garden.

There are a number of traditions regarding the identity of Sheikh Radwan. Christian scholars identify him as Peter the Iberian and the tomb as Peter's monastery, One local tradition has it that the tomb belongs to the 14th-century wali (Sufi saint) Radwan ibn Raslan, a son of the prominent local sheikh, Muhammad al-Batahi. Another tradition claims that Radwan was the brother of al-Batahi and Sheikh Ijlin who were all descendants of the second Muslim caliph, Umar ibn al-Khattab. Prior to the construction of the Sayed al-Hashim Mosque in the al-Daraj Quarter and the modern biographies of the Islamic prophet Muhammad in the 19th century, local Muslim tradition had it that the modern-day tomb of Sheikh Radwan was the burial place of Hashim ibn Abd al-Manaf, Muhammad's great-grandfather. Historian Moshe Sharon attributes the varying traditions to the "tendency of believers to hunt for saints' tombs."

=== Modern era ===
In 1971, the Israeli government pursued a large scale resettlement scheme in order to control the refugee population and prevent separatist violence. The idea was to move refugees to better housing so camp areas could be redeveloped and improved. The plan was part of 9 relocation schemes within the Gaza Strip, parts of nearby al-Shati camp were bulldozed and a housing project in Sheikh Radwan was initiated. Initially, refugee migration to Sheikh Radwan was involuntary since Israeli authorities demolished over 2,000 shelters in the camps to widen the roads for "security reasons" and denied permits for the residents to rebuild their houses. About 8,000 refugees moved into the housing projects of Sheikh Radwan. The United Nations Relief and Works Agency and the Palestine Liberation Organization were vociferous in their opposition to the Israeli action, saying it was forced resettlement. After the start of the First Intifada, Sheikh Radwan was the most consistently active areas in Gaza.

Hamas secretary-general Abdel Aziz al-Rantisi was assassinated in Sheikh Radwan on 17 April 2004 after an Israeli Apache gunship fired on his vehicle. One of Rantisi's sons and two bodyguards were also killed. On 3 October 2005, armed members of Hamas assaulted the Palestinian police station in Sheikh Radwan which ended in the death of Hayam Mohammed Nassar, 30, as she stood on the patio of an adjacent balcony. Members of the Fatah controlled al-Aqsa Martyrs Brigades arrived to defend the police station, and the Hamas militiamen subsequently withdrew. Since the take-over of the Gaza Strip by Hamas in 2007, Sheikh Radwan has been considered a stronghold for the organization. On 17 May 2007 Israel unsuccessfully targeted a senior Hamas member in the district, killing a militant and injuring eight others instead. During the 2008–2009 Israel–Gaza conflict, an Israeli airstrike against a house in Sheikh Radwan left three civilians dead and 25 injured. The cemetery was closed down during the conflict due to the lack of vacant burial places, and thirty graves were destroyed after an Israeli missile struck the cemetery.

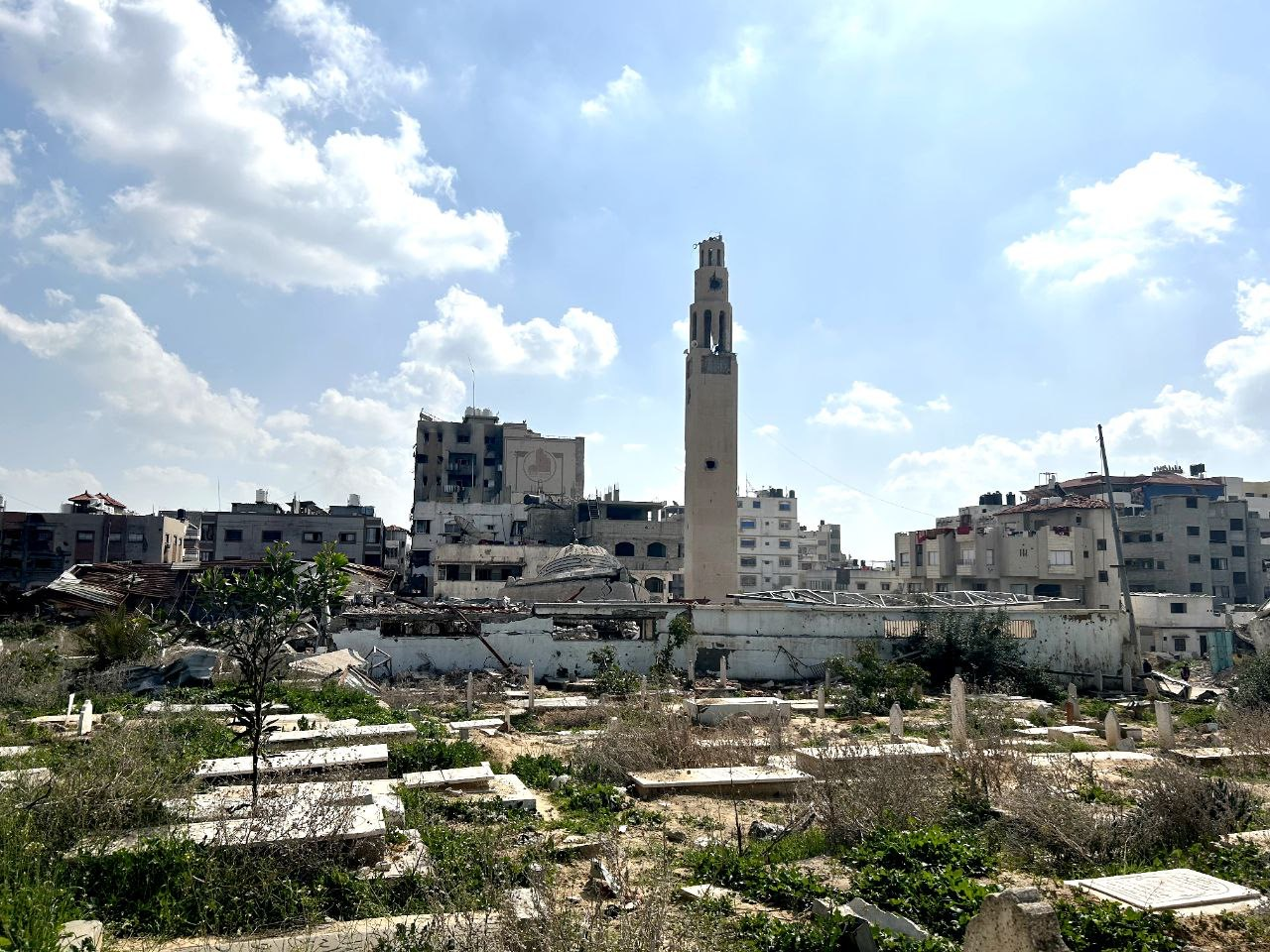
Sheikh Radwan cemetery in 2025 with the ruins of a mosque

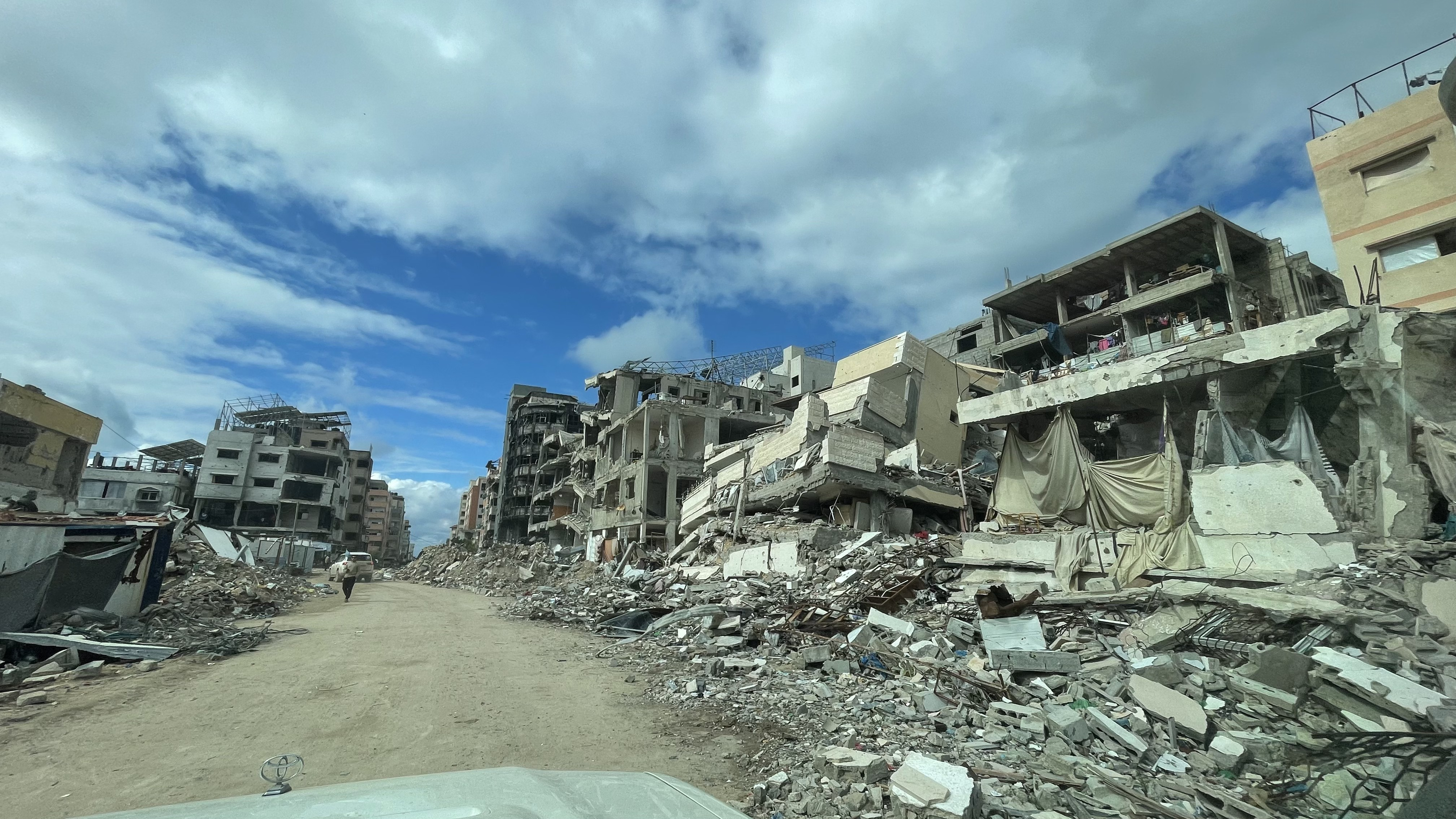
District of Sheikh Radwan in Gaza City, destroyed by Israeli bombing, February 2025

During the Gaza war, the neighborhood was subjected to heavy bombing by Israel, resulting in "unprecedented destruction", including the destruction of homes, mosques, and public areas. In January 2024, Euro-Mediterranean Human Rights Monitor documented damage to several cemeteries in Gaza including the one at Sheikh Radwan.

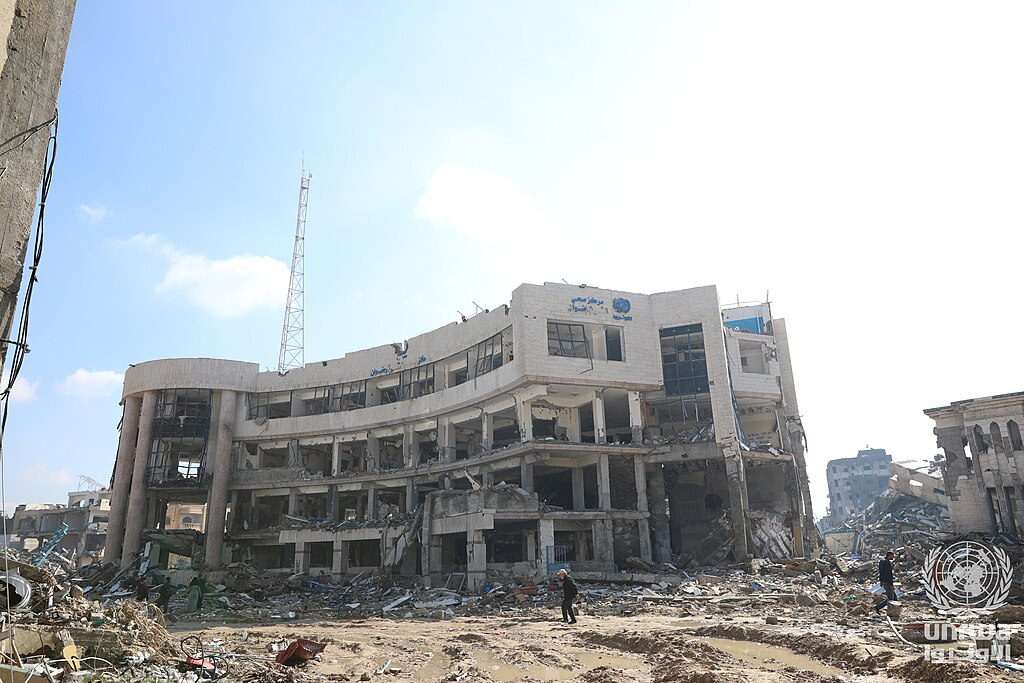
The ruins of the UNRWA el-Sheikh Radwan health centre in February 2024

In August 2024, it was reported that the Sheikh Radwan Lagoon had become polluted by sewage and stagnant rainwater as the result of the area's sanitation systems being damaged by the Gaza war. The lack of infrastructure had led to increase in water-born disease, including polio, hepatitis A, and cholera, and skin infections. The United Nations established vaccination clinic in Sheikh Radwan in November 2024 to distribute the polio vaccine to Palestinian children. The clinic was bombed a few hours after opening, injuring two adults and four children. The Israel Defense Forces and Hamas both denied responsibility for the attack.

== Bibliography ==
- Bitton-Askeloni, Bruria; Kofsky, Arieh (2004). Christian Gaza In Late Antiquity. BRILL. ISBN 9004138684.
- Butt, Gerald (1995). Life at the crossroads: a history of Gaza. Rimal Publications. ISBN 1-900269-03-1.
- Ginat, J; Perkins, Edward Joseph (2001). The Palestinian Refugees: Old Problems-New Solutions. University of Oklahoma Press. ISBN 0-8061-3393-7.
- Guérin, V. (1869). Description Géographique Historique et Archéologique de la Palestine (in French). Vol. 1: Judee, pt. 2. Paris: L'Imprimerie Nationale.
- Karmi, G.; Cotran, Eugene (1999). The Palestinian exodus, 1948-1998. Garnet & Ithaca Press. ISBN 0-86372-244-X.
- McGeough, Paul (2010). Kill Khalid: The Failed Mossad Assassination of Khalid Mishal and the Rise of Hamas. The New Press. ISBN 978-1595585011.
- Nassar, Jamal Raji; Heacock, Roger (1990). Intifada: Palestine at the crossroads. Greenwood Publishing Group. ISBN 0-275-93411-X.
- Palmer, E. H. (1881). The Survey of Western Palestine: Arabic and English Name Lists Collected During the Survey by Lieutenants Conder and Kitchener, R. E. Transliterated and Explained by E.H. Palmer. Committee of the Palestine Exploration Fund.
- Shahin, Mariam (2005). Palestine: A Guide. Interlink Books. ISBN 1-56656-557-X.
- Sharon, M. (1997). Corpus Inscriptionum Arabicarum Palaestinae, A. Vol. 1. BRILL. ISBN 90-04-10833-5.
- Sharon, M. (2009). Corpus Inscriptionum Arabicarum Palaestinae, G. Vol. 4. BRILL. ISBN 978-90-04-17085-8.
