= Necroviolence =

Intentional mistreatment of corpses

Necroviolence as defined by anthropologist Jason De León refers to "violence performed through the specific treatment of corpses" in ways that are offensive and enable a powerful party or group to deny responsibility for the deaths of persons associated with a less powerful party or group.

== Israeli necroviolence against Palestinians ==
=== In Gaza–Israel conflict ===
Israeli forces have been accused of necroviolence in 2020 in Gaza, including violently scooping up a corpse with a bulldozer.

=== Ongoing Israeli use ===
Student of MA International Conflict Studies at King's College London, Aymun Moosavi, and Harvard PhD candidate in anthropology, Randa May Wahbe, have described Israeli necroviolence as including:

- 'Ambiguous loss'; withholding Palestinian bodies in freezers, thus preventing Palestinian families from mourning their loved ones
- The cemeteries of numbers (cemeteries where graves are marked only with numbers and not names, thus dehumanizing the dead)
- Demolition of historic gravesites

== Mexico–United States border ==
In the book The Land of Open Graves by Jason De León, De León and his colleagues discover the dead body of a female migrant that appears to have experienced necroviolence, which he states is the embodiment of what the Department of Homeland Security's "Prevention Through Deterrence" policy looks like.

== Against trans and gender-diverse people ==
In the academic article Necropolitics and Trans Identities: Language Use as Structural Violence, authors Kinsey Stewart and Thomas Delgado argue that language can also harm the dead and that the (mis)use of language within medicolegal death investigation reflects and reinforces structural violence against transgender and gender diverse people.

== See also ==
- Desecration of graves
- Israeli razing of cemeteries in the Gaza Strip
- List of ways people dishonor the dead
