= Avice =

Avice is a feminine given name and a surname. It may refer to:

People:

- Avice Maud Bowbyes (1901–1992), New Zealand writer
- Avice Conway, 17th century heiress and wife of Robert Blennerhassett (MP for Tralee)
- Amicia/Avice Fitz-Hugh, wife of Robert Marmion (married c. 1215)
- Avice la Haubergere (fl. 1271–1210), English blacksmith
- Avice Landone (1910–1976), British actress
- Avice Stafford (1423–1457), first wife of James Butler, 5th Earl of Ormond
- Avice, 18th-century pastry chef credited with inventing choux buns – see Choux pastry
- Claude Avice (1925–1995), French science fiction writer whose main pen name was Pierre Barbet
- Edwige Avice (born 1945), French politician
- Jean Avice, 19th century pastry chef credited by some with inventing the Madeleine cake

Fictional characters:

- Three characters in the 1897 novel The Well-Beloved by Thomas Hardy
- Avice, protagonist of the 2011 novel Embassytown by China Miéville

== See also ==
- Avis (name)
