= Avis (name) =

- Gender: Unisex (mostly female)

Origin
- Word/name: Latin
- Meaning: bird

Avis is both a given name (mostly feminine but also masculine) and a surname.

== Given name ==
The earliest form of this female given name was the Old German Haduwig comprising the elements hadu "battle" and wig "fight": the original form of the modern German female name Hedwig, Haduwig was modified to Havoise by the Normans and subsequent to the Norman Invasion the name occurred frequently in England throughout the Middle Ages, the standard Middle English form of the name being Hawise. As a female given name in modern times, Avis is associated with the Latin avis, meaning "bird", although the spelling Avice is sometimes found.

People with the given name include:

- Avis Acres (1910–1994), New Zealand children's author and illustrator
- Avis Bohlen (born 1940), American diplomat, former Ambassador to Bulgaria
- Avis Bunnage (1923–1990), British actress
- Avis DeVoto (1904–1989), American editor and collaborator with Julia Child
- Avis M. Dry (1922–2007), clinical psychologist and author on the psychology of Carl Jung
- Avis Favaro (born 1958), Canadian TV medical correspondent
- Avis Gray (born 1954), Canadian politician
- Avis Higgs (1918–2016), New Zealand textile designer and painter
- Avis Hotchkiss, American pioneering motorcyclist who made a round-trip journey from New York to San Francisco with her daughter in 1915
- Avis Kimble (born 1944), American model
- Avice Landone (1910–1976), British actress
- Avis McIntosh (born 1938), New Zealand former sprinter
- Avis Miller (1945–2021), American model and Playboy Playmate
- Avis Newman (born 1946), English painter and sculptor
- Avis Nurijanyan (1896–1938), Bolshevik revolutionary and Soviet politician of Armenian origin (here, the name is an apocopic form of Avetis)
- Avis Red Bear, American journalist
- Avis Tucker (1915–2010), American owner and publisher of The Daily Star-Journal newspaper
- Avis Stearns Van Wagenen (1841–1907), a partner in E. C. Stearns & Company
- Avis Wyatt (born 1984), American male former basketball player

== Surname ==
- David Avis (born 1951), Canadian and British computer scientist
- Gary Avis, English ballet dancer with The Royal Ballet
- Isis Avis Loren, Australian drag queen
- Paul Avis (born 1947), Anglican priest, theologian and ecumenist
- Samuel B. Avis (1872–1924), American politician
- Warren Avis (1915–2007), the founder of Avis Rent A Car

== See also ==
- Hedwig (given name)
- Hawise (disambiguation)
