= Helvise =

Helvise is a form of the feminine given names Elizabeth and Heloise. It may refer to:

- Héloïse de Pithiviers (c. 965–1025), lady of Pithiviers
- Helvise of Corbon (died 1080), viscountess of Châteaudun
- Helvise of Nevers (died 1114), countess of Évreux
- Helvise of Mondoubleau (fl. 1130), viscountess of Châteaudun

== See also ==
- Helvis (disambiguation)
- Hawise (disambiguation)
