= Hawise =

Hawise or Havoise is a form of the feminine given name Heloise. It may refer to:

- Hawise of Chester, 1st Countess of Lincoln (1180–ca. 1242), Anglo-Norman noblewoman and heiress
- Hawise, Duchess of Brittany (ca. 1037–1072), hereditary Duchess of Brittany from 1066 until her death
- Hawys Gadarn (Hawys ferch Owain ap Gruffudd ap Gwenwynwyn), (1291 – c. 1353), Lady of Powys, heir to kingdom of Powys Wenwynwyn in Wales
- Hawise Lestrange (died 1310), Princess of southern Powys, implicated in a plot to overthrow the prince of Wales, Llywelyn ap Gruffudd, in 1274
- Hawise Mone (fl. 1428–1430), English Lollard in Norfolk in the fifteenth century
- Hawise of Monmouth (fl. early 12th century), wife of William fitzBaderon
- Hawise of Normandy (died 1034), Countess of Rennes, Duchess of Brittany and Regent to her son Alan III, Duke of Brittany
- Hawise, Countess of Aumale (died 1214), daughter and heiress of William, Count of Aumale

== See also ==
- Avis (name)
- Hedwig (given name)
- Helvise (disambiguation)
