= Heloise Bowles Cruse =

American journalist

Heloise
- Born: Eloise Bowles; May 4, 1919
- Died: December 28, 1977 (aged 58)
- Occupations: Newspaper columnist, author

Heloise Bowles Cruse (May 4, 1919 – December 28, 1977 was the original author of the popular syndicated newspaper column "Hints from Heloise."

Born in Fort Worth, Texas, Bowles married Marshal (Mike) Holman Cruse, a United States Air Force captain (later colonel) in 1946. Their daughter Ponce Kiah Marchelle Heloise Cruse, born in 1951, is the current "Heloise".

Bowles Cruse had been exchanging hints with neighboring stay-at-home wives. While at a party she mentioned her wish to start a newspaper column where housewives could share hints. A colonel with two degrees in journalism laughed and bet her $10 she couldn’t get a newspaper job, for she was "nothing but a housewife." The next day she went to the offices of the Honolulu Advertiser and convinced the editor to try her column on a 30-day, no-pay basis.

The original column was first published as "Readers' Exchange" in 1959. In 1961, King Features syndicated it as "Hints from Heloise"; nearly 600 newspapers carried the column, and, at the time of her death, it was one of three most popular (in terms of syndication) in the United States.

Her book Heloise's Housekeeping Hints, published by Prentice-Hall, Inc., was, at half a million copies total, one of the top 10 selling hardcover books in 1963. The book later became the fastest selling paperback in the history of its publisher Pocket Books.

== Books ==
- Heloise's Housekeeping Hints (1962)
- Heloise's Kitchen Hints (1963)
- Heloise All Around the House (1965)
- Hints For Working Women (1966)
- Heloise's Work and Money Savers (1967)
