= Eloise (2016 film) =

- Theatrical release poster
- Directed by: Robert Legato
- Written by: Christopher Borrelli
- Produced by: Sanford Nelson; Tripp Vinson
- Starring: Eliza Dushku; Robert Patrick; Chace Crawford; Brandon T. Jackson; Nicole Forester; P. J. Byrne
- Cinematography: Antonio Riestra
- Edited by: Greg D'Auria
- Music by: Ronen Landa
- Production companies: SLAM Productions; Palm Drive Productions; Vinson Films
- Distributed by: Vertical Entertainment
- Release dates: December 28, 2016 (Indonesia); December 30, 2016 (Vietnam); February 3, 2017 (United States)
- Running time: 89 minutes
- Country: United States
- Language: English

Eloise is a 2016 American thriller film directed by Robert Legato and written by Christopher Borrelli. The film stars Eliza Dushku, Robert Patrick, Chace Crawford, Brandon T. Jackson, Nicole Forester, and P. J. Byrne. The film was released on February 3, 2017, by Vertical Entertainment.

== Plot ==
The film opens with pictures and audio about the real Eloise Asylum and the fire that destroyed the building in 1982. Afterwards, a woman named Pia in an asylum is shown being questioned by a detective. The detective informs Pia that they have found the bodies of her brother and friend but were unable to find her other friend Jacob.

In the past, Jacob is contacted by an attorney to inform him of his father's death. After meeting with the attorney, Jacob learns he will inherit $1,200,000 but first must prove that an unknown aunt is also deceased. He also learns that while his father had cancer, he instead died by suicide. While retrieving items from his father's house, Jacob is startled by his friend Dell, who steals a pocket watch. Later, they visit a bar where Pia is the bartender, and Jacob convinces Dell to help him find his aunt's records in exchange for helping Dell get $20,000. When Jacob goes to the asylum to pick up the records, he learns they are in the annex building and that he would need a court order (which could take six to seven months) but is able to bribe the clerk to give him admission.

After deciding to break into the annex building, Jacob and Dell meet with a man named Scott for blueprints. It is revealed that Pia is Scott's sister.

The group manages to successfully break into the building, despite almost being caught by a police officer. Once they reach the annex room, the group begins to sort through the hundreds of filing cabinets for the aunt's records, with flashbacks of the orderlies' mistreatment of the asylum patients interspersed throughout the scene. There is a specific emphasis on the patients being forced to confront their fears through abusive procedures. While passing by the maternity ward, Pia sees a child in the hallway holding a box. Scott is also able to see human figures through his infrared camera, but after spotting pictures of himself on the wall, he experiences visions of orderlies forcing him onto a bed. In shock, he falls through the floor onto a waiting gurney and is whisked away by orderlies.

Jacob eventually finds his aunt's records but Dell cuts his hand while breaking the glass of a locked door, which he wanted to unlock to retrieve the stolen pocket watch that he had dropped earlier. After stealing medication, he accidentally pours LSD onto his hand instead of peroxide, causing him to hallucinate. He shoots at the hallucinations, but finds that he has been transported into a locked room filled with dead bodies. After breaking a water line, the room fills with water and Dell is drowned while being pulled down by hands.

Elsewhere, Scott is forced onto a bed by doctors and nurses in the past, who proceed to hammer a sharp tool into his eye. While Jacob and Pia look for Scott, they are transported into a past art class, where they see their own drawings on the wall. In the present, they see who they assume is Scott and chase him down the halls, only to find the bodies of Scott and a homeless man whose shopping cart was hit by Jacob earlier in the film. Suddenly they are transported back to the past again, with the staff now chasing them around the asylum.

A doctor then lectures to onlookers about fears, forcing Jacob and Pia to both face their greatest fears. Jacob is strapped to a gurney and forced into a morgue drawer for his claustrophobia, while Pia is punctured by needles repeatedly to confront her fear of injections. Pia is able to free herself and disguise herself as a nurse, allowing her to search the asylum for Jacob. After releasing him, they enter a woman's room named Guinevere Martin, who is about to give birth on Jacob's birthday. Jacob realizes Guinevere is actually his mother and tells her that he is her son from the present day. The nurse then promises Guinevere that Baby Jacob will be given to her brother so that he won't be raised in the asylum. It is then revealed that the girl that Pia saw earlier is actually a young Pia, who was tasked with delivering the box containing a hidden Baby Jacob. The doctor from earlier is also revealed to be Jacob's father, who slaps Pia's mother for hiding his son. Jacob remembers that the fire was started on this day and decides to pour chemicals everywhere to amplify it. Once the fire is started, everyone flees the asylum, but Jacob is pulled back inside while Pia is forced back into the present.

Back in present day, the asylum is still on fire, with Pia being distraught about her brother and friends being killed. Later, Pia is shown in the same ward from the beginning of the film looking at pictures. In the past, the doctor is happy to have finally gotten his son back, while a nurse with Jacob's birth certificate checks off that he was born but is now dead.

== Cast ==
- Eliza Dushku as Pia Carter
- Robert Patrick Dr. H. H. Greiss
- Chace Crawford as Jacob Martin
- Brandon T. Jackson as Dell Richards
- Nicole Forester Genevieve Martin
- P. J. Byrne as Scott Carter
- Ricky Wayne as Detective Frazier

== Production ==
On April 25, 2014, Chace Crawford, Eliza Dushku, Brandon T. Jackson and P. J. Byrne joined the cast. Principal photography began on May 5, 2014.

It was shot in and around Metropolitan Detroit, and was financed in part by a $2 million Michigan film incentive subsidy from the State of Michigan. Much of it was filmed at Eloise. (Note: "The Eloise of the title isn’t a children’s-book heroine, but the name of an actual eastern Michigan mental institution that existed for 150 years, and was for a time the country’s largest — comprising 78 buildings on more than 900 acres. That much is true, although an opening text crawl goes on to spin some fictive hooey about rumored "inhumane testing and treatment" overseen by psychiatric chief Dr. H.H. Greiss (Robert Patrick), as well as a "devastating fire" that shuttered the facility in 1982.")

== Release ==
The film was released on February 3, 2017, by Vertical Entertainment.

== Critical reception ==
Critic John DeFore of The Hollywood Reporter wrote that it is "An incoherent, time-hopping paranormal tale." It offered condolences to the actual staff of Eloise.

The New York Times declared it, "A horror movie of such ineptitude that it invites sympathy for even its least gifted participants."

Variety was dismissive: "A notorious former insane asylum turns out — surprise! — to be a bad place to visit in this generic horror opus. Reasonably slick but empty, 'Eloise' is no Session 9 as far as haunted-former-mental-hospital horrors go. Heck, it's not even a Grave Encounters 2."

Rotten Tomatoes gave it an 11% rating. On Metacritic it has a score of 15% based on reviews from 6 critics, indicating "overwhelming dislike".
