= Heloise (columnist) =

American writer

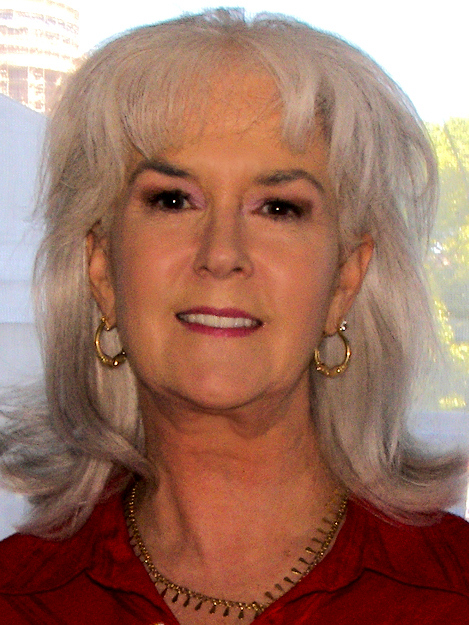
Heloise at the 2010 Texas Book Festival.

Ponce Kiah Marchelle Heloise Cruse Evans (born April 15, 1951 in Waco, Texas), best known by her pen name Heloise, is an American writer, author, and speaker specializing in lifestyle hints, including consumer issues, pets, travel, food, home improvement, and health. Heloise's father was in the Air Force, and like many military brats she moved frequently.

Heloise's mother, Heloise Bowles (May 4, 1919 – December 28, 1977), born in Fort Worth, Texas, started a newspaper column in the Honolulu Advertiser called "Readers Exchange" in February 1959, later changed to "Hints from Heloise" when King Features Syndicate picked up the column and started syndicating it nationwide. Within just a few years, the column appeared in over 600 newspapers worldwide.

Heloise (the daughter) took over the column in 1977 when mother Heloise died of heart disease. She worked with her mother for several years and contributed to the column as Heloise II. It is still one of the most widely syndicated newspaper columns. She is a contributing editor for Good Housekeeping magazine and writes the monthly column "Heloise to the Rescue." She has written 11 books, hosted a national radio show and is a nationally known speaker. In 1983 an on-line database of "Hints from Heloise" became one of the first on-line information products available to the public via the Mattel Aquarius computer system.

Heloise graduated from the Southwest Texas State University in San Marcos, Texas (now Texas State University) in 1974 with a double major in business administration and mathematics, and a teacher's certificate. She currently resides near San Antonio, Texas.
