= Eloise Cemetery =

Part of the Eloise hospital complex in Wayne County, Michigan

Coordinates: 42.28117°N 83.33918°W

- Interactive map of Eloise Cemetery

Details
- Established: 1892
- Location: Nankin Township, Michigan

Eloise Cemetery was the name applied to cemeteries used by the Eloise hospital complex located in what was then Nankin Township in western Wayne County, Michigan, and is now Westland, Michigan. The patients buried in the cemetery were from the Infirmary Division, the William P. Seymour General Hospital, the T.B. Sanitarium and the Eloise Hospital (Psychiatric Division). The majority of burials were from the Infirmary Division which was the largest of the three divisions, housing up to 7,000 patients at a time. Most burials were of adult males, but there are women and a few infants and children.

== History ==
The first notation made of an institutional cemetery was in 1892 when the Hospital arranged with Catholic Bishop John Samuel Foley to move bodies which had been buried northwest of the County House to an island in the middle of the reservoir. This move was made to enable the first paving of Michigan Avenue which occurred in 1910. Part of the artificial lake at that time had to be filled in. There were actually two other cemeteries that were used to bury Eloise patients after the turn of the century. The first was on the northeast corner of farmland south of Michigan Avenue and one further south on the farm site facing Henry Ruff Road. The second cemetery is surrounded by pine trees and is the one used from 1910 to 1948.

In effect, this was operated as a "Potter's Field", that is a publicly run place to bury the poor unclaimed dead at the public expense.

In the early days patients were buried by inmates or employees of the institution. In 1937 the contract was given to Charles C. Diggs, Sr., who founded "The House of Diggs" (reputed to be Michigan's largest funeral home at one time) and a politician, to handle burials in the cemetery and transfers to Wayne State University School of Medicine as state law mandated that these functions be handled or supervised by a licensed mortician. Charles Diggs, Jr., then 15 years old, would drive his mother from Detroit to the morgue which was a red brick building at Eloise called the round house because of its shape and they would prepare the body for burial. White sheets were used to line the wooden coffins and, unless the patient had clothing, they were covered in another white sheet. If family or friends were present there would be an interment service; if not the deceased would just be buried by inmates.

About 7,100 people were buried in the Eloise cemetery between 1910 and 1948. These were patients who died at the institution and had no known relatives or relatives who were unwilling or unable to bury them. Only numbered blocks identify the graves. After 1948 all unclaimed bodies were sent to the Wayne State University College of Medicine and no further burials were made there. Burial records in the late 1920s and 1930s were especially problematical or nonexistent. For example, "There were only four extant death records for 1934." The names of over 4,000 of the 7,100 people buried in the cemetery were added to Find A Grave. (Note: The names were obtained by going through the death certificates on Seeking Michigan website and going through original death certificates in the Burton Historical Collection of the Detroit Public Library. In addition there were ledgers kept by the hospital on deaths of patients used to record names of some burials.)

Patricia Ibbotson worked as a nurse at Eloise before it was closed. She is also the author of the book, Eloise: Poorhouse, Farm, Asylum and Hospital 1839–1984. She raised money for the historic marker. She also wrote Detroit's Hospitals, Healers and Helpers which has an entire chapter of captioned photos of Eloise.

From the 19th century, the cemetery was a source of cadavers, after body snatching, which were used by medical students at the University of Michigan. From 1948, the laws were changed so that the hospital became a ready source and bodies were sent to Detroit Medical College.

== Present situation ==
The cemetery is owned and maintained by Wayne County. It is fenced and there are "No Trespassing" signs posted. The graves are marked by numbered markers and the names of most of the people buried there have been lost to history. However, presently 6,158 of the burials are now on FindAGrave.

The field lay forgotten and neglected, especially since the last burial (in one of the three plots) was in 1948; it now stands in the way of other uses, and is seen as a responsibility by Wayne County commissioners who are perplexed over use of the Eloise site. The presence of over 7,000 marked but unnamed graves — and the absence of many supporting records — is potentially an insuperable obstacle to any future development.

Similar situations exist. In 1989, former, Detroit Mayor Coleman A. Young abandoned a plan to expand Detroit City Airport's runway because the adjoining Gethsemane Cemetery blocked the way, and outraged relatives protested. As a result, a few years later Southwest Airlines ended its operations there, citing the city's inability to keep its promises and the need for longer runways to accommodate larger jet aircraft. Likewise, in the 1980s, the Hamtramck, Michigan Poletown plant was built around Beth Olem, a/k/a The Smith Street Cemetery, a small Jewish cemetery. According to Frank Rembisz, former Hamtramck city council president, to move the cemetery, they needed to get surviving relatives's permission, and would have had to retain "Talmudic scholars from Israel to sift through the earth to make sure there were no remains left." General Motors decided the expense exceeded the benefit, and left it in place. (Note: Under Michigan law, disturbing a grave site or cemetery is a felony. There are substantial procedures concerning moving or abandoning a cemetery. Cemeteries are protected by Michigan law, and disinterment is prohibited and re-interment is strictly regulated, with requirements for notice and an opportunity to be heard, and for just compensation if there is an objection.)
