= Heloise Hersey =

American academic

Heloise Edwina Hersey (1855–1933) was an American scholar of Anglo-Saxon language and literature. A graduate of Vassar College and the first female professor of Anglo-Saxon studies in the United States, she was appointed at Smith College in 1878.

== Biography ==
The daughter of a doctor from Oxford, Maine, Hersey received her A.B. from Vassar College in 1876, and from 1877 to 1899, she ran her own school, Miss Hersey's School for Girls, in Boston. In 1878 she was appointed at Smith College, where she worked until 1883 teaching rhetoric and Anglo-Saxon, sharing teaching duties with Laurenus Clark Seelye, the college's president. She was awarded honorary degrees by Bowdoin College (1921) and Tufts University (1922).

In 1901 she published a collection of letters called To Girls.

Vassar College has a scholarship in her name, the Heloise E. Hersey Fund, "to be expended for the purchase of books, preferably those of recent issue that have real literary value". Her uncle started the scholarship.
