= Eloise (psychiatric hospital) =

Psychiatric hospital in Westland, Michigan

Eloise Psychiatric Hospital
- Interactive map of the Eloise Psychiatric Hospital area
- Former names: Wayne County Poor House

General information
- Location: 30712 Michigan Ave., Westland, Michigan
- Coordinates: 42.2873°N 83.3426°W
- Named for: Eloise Dickerson Davock

Eloise Psychiatric Hospital was a large complex located in Westland, Michigan. It was named after Eloise Dickerson Davock, the daughter of Detroit's postmaster.

Eloise is a historical landmark with a rich history dating back to 1931 being the current building left standing. They offer a variety of attractions for haunted houses, escape rooms and history tours.

== History ==
The Wayne County Poor House was founded in 1832. It was located at Gratiot and Mt. Elliott Avenues in Hamtramck Township, two miles from the Detroit city limits. By 1834 the poorhouse was in bad condition and 280 acres (110 ha) in Nankin Township were purchased. The Black Horse Tavern, which served as a stagecoach stop between Detroit and Chicago, was located on the property. In those days it was a two-day stagecoach ride from Hamtramck Township to Nankin Township. The register shows that on April 11, 1839, 35 people were transferred from the poorhouse in Hamtramck Township to the new one in Nankin Township. One hundred eleven apparently refused to go to the "awful wilderness." Many were children, and homes among the residents of the city may have been found for them. The log cabin, which was formerly the Black Horse Tavern, became the keeper's quarters, and in 1839 an A-frame building was put up to house the inmates — more appropriately termed, by today's standards, patients. An A-frame cookhouse was erected in the back of the log building and was used for cooking by the inmates, the staff and the keeper's family.

The complex was self-sufficient. It had its own police and fire departments along with a railroad and trolley system. It included a bakery, amusement hall, laundry facility, post office and a power plant. It had its own farm, which included a dairy herd, dairy barns, piggery, root cellar, tobacco curing building and greenhouses. Patients came from Detroit and other communities to have x-rays done. It also housed the first kidney dialysis unit in the State of Michigan and pioneered the use of music therapy. Staff also used hydrotherapy, shock therapy and insulin therapy to treat patients.

As the years went on, the institution grew larger and larger, a reflection of the population increases of the Detroit area. From only 35 residents in 1839, the complex grew to about 10,000 residents at its peak during the Great Depression. Slowly over the next 40 years, Eloise's population decreased. The farm operations ceased in 1958 and some of the large psychiatric buildings were vacated in 1973. The psychiatric division started closing in 1977, and the last patients were transferred out in 1982 when the State of Michigan took over. The general hospital closed in 1986.

Inventor Elijah McCoy may be its most famous former resident. He spent a year prior to his death as a patient in the Eloise Infirmary. There were other well-known people who died at Eloise including several baseball players, among them Jul Kustus, Larry LeJeune, Charlie Krause and Marty Kavanagh. Musician Horace Flinders was also a patient and received music therapy.

== Eloise today ==
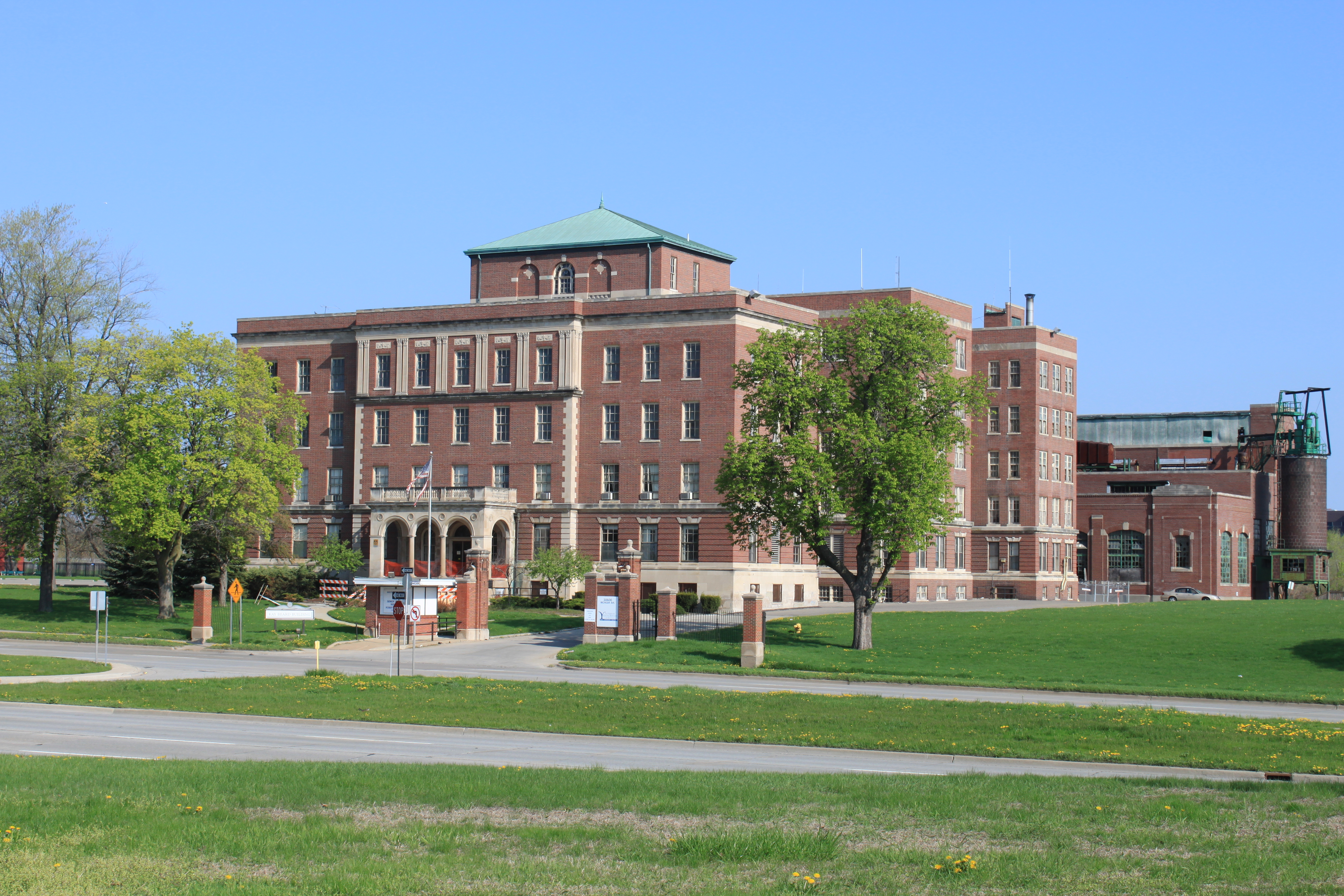
Kay Beard Building

Today the land that once was Eloise has been developed into a strip mall, golf course and condominiums. However, the "D" Building (the Kay Beard Building) is still in use. It was used for psychiatric admissions, housed 400 patients and had living quarters for some employees like the Catholic chaplain. Later it was used by the Wayne County administration until 2016. The old commissary building is currently being used as a family homeless shelter.

The firehouse (the former psychiatric facility laundry) and the power plant are still standing. As of June 2025, the firehouse shell has been restored and is being used for storage while the power plant is slated for demolition due to structural damage. The bakery was heavily damaged by arson in April 2016 and all that currently remains is the foundation and some debris surrounding its location.

The Eloise smokestack, — with the emblazoned Eloise in brick, — was deemed a hazard and demolished in 2006.

In 1979, the Walter P. Reuther Psychiatric Hospital was opened. It is located near the northwest end of the former Eloise property, just southeast of the intersection of Merriman and Palmer Roads. The facility is currently operated by the Michigan Department of Community Health.

In 1996, Oakwood Health System (later merged into Beaumont Health) opened an outpatient facility, the Adams Child & Adolescent Health Center, on the corner of Merriman and Palmer near Reuther Hospital. Both facilities have Palmer Road addresses.

Eloise is featured in the book Annie's Ghosts: A Journey Into a Family Secret by Steve Luxenberg, which is about Luxenberg's secret aunt who was committed to the Eloise psychiatric hospital in the 1940s.

The site is marked by a Michigan Historic Marker.

The site and the adjoining Eloise Cemetery are reputed to be haunted.

== In popular culture ==
It inspired the horror movie Eloise. The film stars Eliza Dushku, Robert Patrick, Chace Crawford, Brandon T. Jackson, Nicole Forester, and P. J. Byrne. The film was released on February 3, 2017, by Vertical Entertainment.

It was featured in Expedition X: Ghosts of Eloise Asylum Part 1 and Part 2. Released August 9, 2023. Starring Josh Gates, Phil Torres and Jessica Chobot.

It was featured in Ghost Brothers: Lights Out, Season 1 episode 2: Dead and Forgotten.
