= Sheikh Ijlin =

Sheikh Ijlin الشيخ عجلين
- Neighborhood
- Sheikh Ajleen
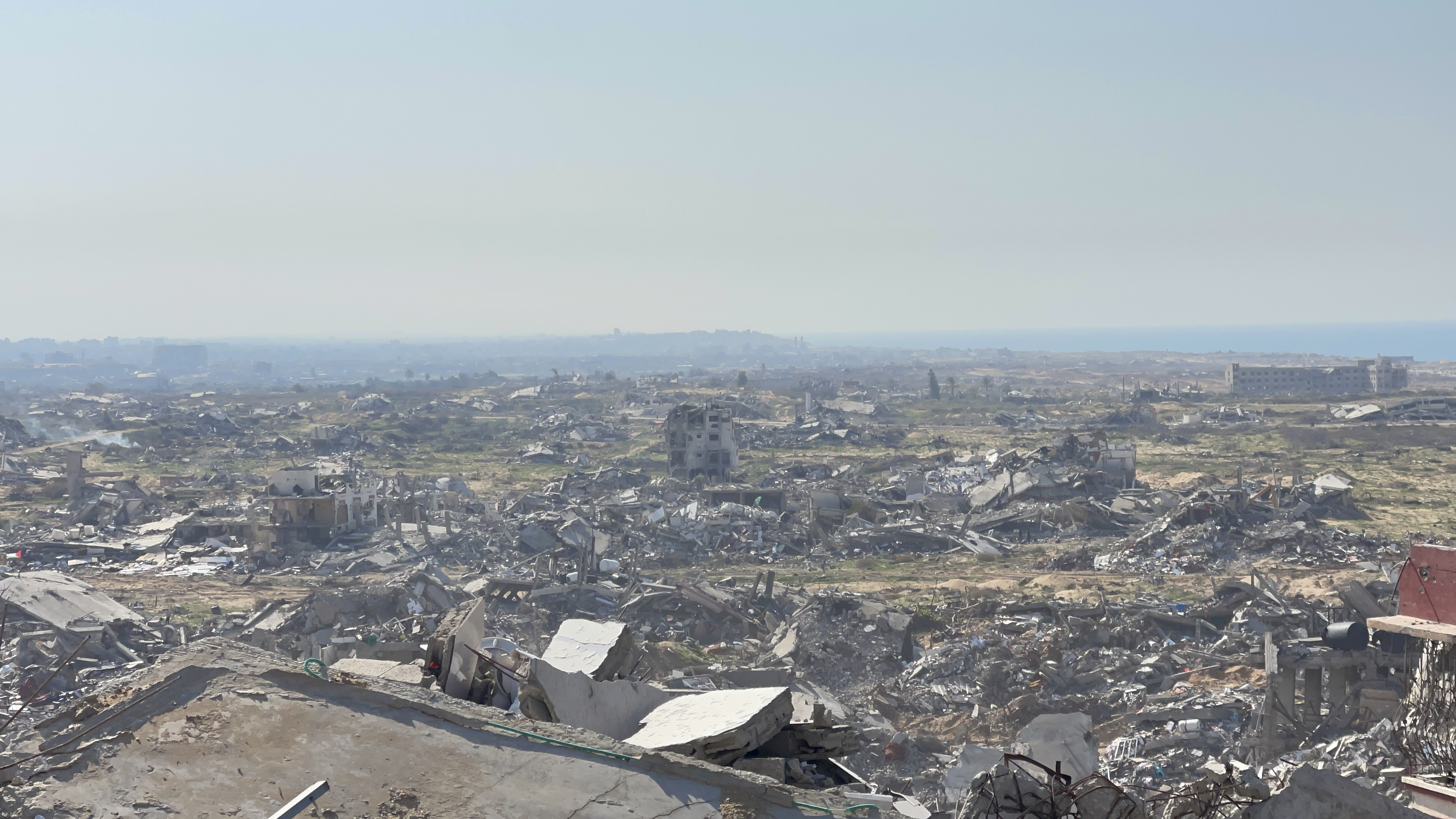
- The neighbourhood in January 2025
- Interactive map of Sheikh Ijlin
- Coordinates: 31°30′48.1″N 34°25′41.3″E
- State: Palestine
- Governorate: Gaza Governorate
- City: Gaza
- Time zone: UTC+2 (EET)
  - Summer (DST): +3

Sheikh Ijlin (Arabic: الشيخ عجلين) is a neighborhood in southern Gaza City near the coastal road.

On 18 November 2002, the Israel Defense Forces (IDF) attacked the neighborhood, destroying the offices of the Preventive Security Force of the Palestinian National Authority.

An internationally-backed sewage cleanup in 2022 saw Gaza's sewage treatment plants increase their operations, resulting in a reduction of waste entering the sea. This resulted in the Mediterranean Sea being clean enough to swim in and the neighborhood's beaches became popular in Gaza City.

In December 2023 The New York Times reported that Israel had razed cemeteries in the Gaza Strip including that of Sheikh Ijlin.

== Bibliography ==
- Guérin, Victor (1869). Description Géographique Historique et Archéologique de la Palestine (in French). Vol. 1: Judee, pt. 2. Paris: L'Imprimerie Nationale. (visit in 1863: p. 214)
- Palmer, E. H. (1881). The Survey of Western Palestine: Arabic and English Name Lists Collected During the Survey by Lieutenants Conder and Kitchener, R. E. Transliterated and Explained by E.H. Palmer. Committee of the Palestine Exploration Fund.
