= June 2024 northern Gaza City airstrikes =

Dual airstrikes, striking a refugee camp during the Gaza war

- Part of the Israeli bombing of the Gaza Strip in the Gaza war
- Type: Airstrikes
- Location: Al-Shati refugee camp and Tuffah, Gaza City, Gaza Strip; 31.532197°N 34.445394°E
- Target: A senior Hamas official
- Date: 22 June 2024
- Executed by: Israel Defense Forces
- Casualties: 43+ killed, (Note: Including 24+ in Al-Shati and 18+ in Tuffah) 35+ injured, 19+ missing

The June 2024 northern Gaza City airstrikes or the al-Shati and Tuffah dual airstrikes took place on 22 June 2024, when two airstrikes conducted by the Israeli Defense Forces (IDF) occurred at roughly the same time in northern districts of Gaza City, striking the al-Shati refugee camp and the Tuffah district, killing at least 43 people and wounding dozens more.

== Background ==
The al-Shati refugee camp was first targeted on 9 October 2023, within 48 hours of the start of the Gaza war, hitting and destroying four mosques while killing at least 15 Palestinians. On 10 November, Israel Defense Forces (IDF) invaded the camp during the Israeli invasion of the Gaza Strip, with the IDF claiming to have killed roughly 150 Hamas operatives during battles in the region before taking control of the camp.

At the time of the airstrikes, displaced Palestinians from the northern Gaza Strip were told to seek refuge in the al-Shati refugee camp, as a humanitarian safe zone.

== Airstrikes ==
Two airstrikes targeted separate areas in northern districts of Gaza City, the first striking a residential block in the al-Shati refugee camp, and the second striking houses in the Tuffah district. Israeli media reported that the IDF was potentially targeting a senior Hamas official. A Gaza City civil defense spokesperson said that the attacks felt like "an earthquake" that targeted the whole area, burying several families under rubble. Many of the injured were taken to Baptist Hospital and al-Ahli Arab hospital, who had difficulty treating casualties due to a severe shortage of fuel and medical supplies.

At least 24 Palestinians were killed in al-Shati camp, while at least 18 were killed in al-Tuffah. Following the airstrikes, the IDF released a statement said that it struck "two Hamas military infrastructure sites". Dozens of Palestinians were injured in the airstrikes and resulting structure collapses, at least 35 of whom were in Tuffah, while at least 19 people working at a Tuffah factory were reported missing. Gaza's Civil Defence stated that the vast majority of victims were civilians, with several being children. They further stated that there were still dozens of Palestinians trapped under debris of, and that rescue operations were extremely difficult.

== Reactions ==
Hamas officials claimed that the airstrikes were deliberately targeting civilians, stating that the "occupation and its Nazi leaders" would face retaliation as a result.

United Nations Relief and Works Agency for Palestine Refugees in the Near East (UNRWA) released a statement decrying the IDF's "blatant disregard of humanitarian law", stating how their indiscriminate attacks left no region in Gaza safe.

== See also ==
- List of massacres in Palestine
- July 2024 al-Shati refugee camp attack
- Al-Shati refugee camp airstrikes
- Jabalia refugee camp airstrikes (2023–present)
- Attacks on refugee camps in the Gaza war
- Timeline of the Israeli–Palestinian conflict in 2024
- Timeline of the Gaza war (7 May 2024 – 12 July 2024)
- Outline of the Gaza war
- Gaza genocide
