= July 2024 al-Shati refugee camp attack =

Military shelling on Gaza City prayer hall

- Part of the siege of Gaza City in the Gaza war
- Location within the Gaza Strip
- Location: Al-Shati refugee camp, Gaza City, Gaza Strip
- Date: 13 July 2024
- Attack type: Shelling
- Deaths: 22+ Palestinians (20 were militants, according to Israel)
- Injuries: 20+ Palestinians
- Perpetrator: Israel Defense Forces

On 13 July 2024, the Israel Defense Forces (IDF) conducted an attack against a makeshift mosque in the al-Shati refugee camp in Gaza City. The bombings killed 22 worshippers as they prayed inside the mosque. Palestinian sources reported those killed were civilians, while Israel said it killed "20 Hamas terrorists".

== Background ==
The al-Shati camp was established in 1948 for about 23,000 Palestinians who fled or were expelled by Israeli forces during the 1948 Arab–Israeli War. As of 2023, it was one of the most densely populated places in the world with a population of over 90,000 refugees in an area of only 0.52 km^{2}.

The Israel Defense Forces (IDF) conducted two separate airstrikes on the refugee camp at the beginning of the Gaza war on 9 and 12 October, destroying four mosques and killing at least 15 civilians. Houses in the al-Shati camp were again targeted by Israeli forces on 22 June 2024, where an airstrike killed 24 people.

== Attack ==
On 13 July 2024, the Palestinian Civil Defense in Gaza reported that at least 22 people were killed by military shelling conducted in the al-Shati refugee camp, leaving several more victims in critical condition. The agency reported that many of the victims were gathered in a prayer room for noon prayer at the site of a destroyed mosque at the time of the attack. Eyewitnesses reported that the camp residents only gathered for noon prayer at the mosque, and not for evening Maghrib and Isha prayers in order to avoid being potentially targeted then.

The Palestinian Red Crescent Society (PRCS) reported that they had recovered six bodies and three critically injured civilians shortly following the attack. At least ten deceased and twenty injured victims were taken to the nearby al-Ahli Arab Hospital.

== Reactions ==
Hamas called the attacks "escalating Zionist terrorism and crimes against humanity". Palestinian sources reported those killed were civilians, while Israel said it killed "20 Hamas terrorists". One Palestinian local said an entire mosque shouldn't be bombed just because a Hamas member happens to be praying in it.

The Iraqi government condemned the attacks in conjunction with attacks on al-Mawasi camp that also occurred on 13 July 2024, calling the attacks and Israeli Prime Minister Benjamin Netanyahu's and his government's role in them acts attempts to "undermine all concepts of international law" while ignoring "every humanitarian voice", that would further destabilize the Middle East and spread conflict outside the region. He repeated earlier calls to the international community to hold Israel accountable for its "blatant aggression by an entity that considers itself above international law and justice" as a "dangerous precedent in human history", and to support Palestinian human rights.

== See also ==
- 2024 targeted assassination of Muhammad Deif
- 13 July 2024 al-Mawasi airstrikes
- 9 July 2024 Gaza attacks
- June 2024 northern Gaza City airstrikes
- Al-Shati refugee camp airstrikes
- 4 December 2024 al-Mawasi attack
- Timeline of the Israeli–Palestinian conflict in 2024
- Timeline of the Gaza war (13 July 2024 – 26 September 2024)
- Israeli war crimes in the Gaza war
- Gaza genocide
