= Israeli bombing of the Gaza Strip =

Aerial bombardment of Palestine, from 2023

Bombing of the Gaza Strip
- Part of the Israeli invasion of the Gaza Strip during the Gaza war and the Gaza genocide
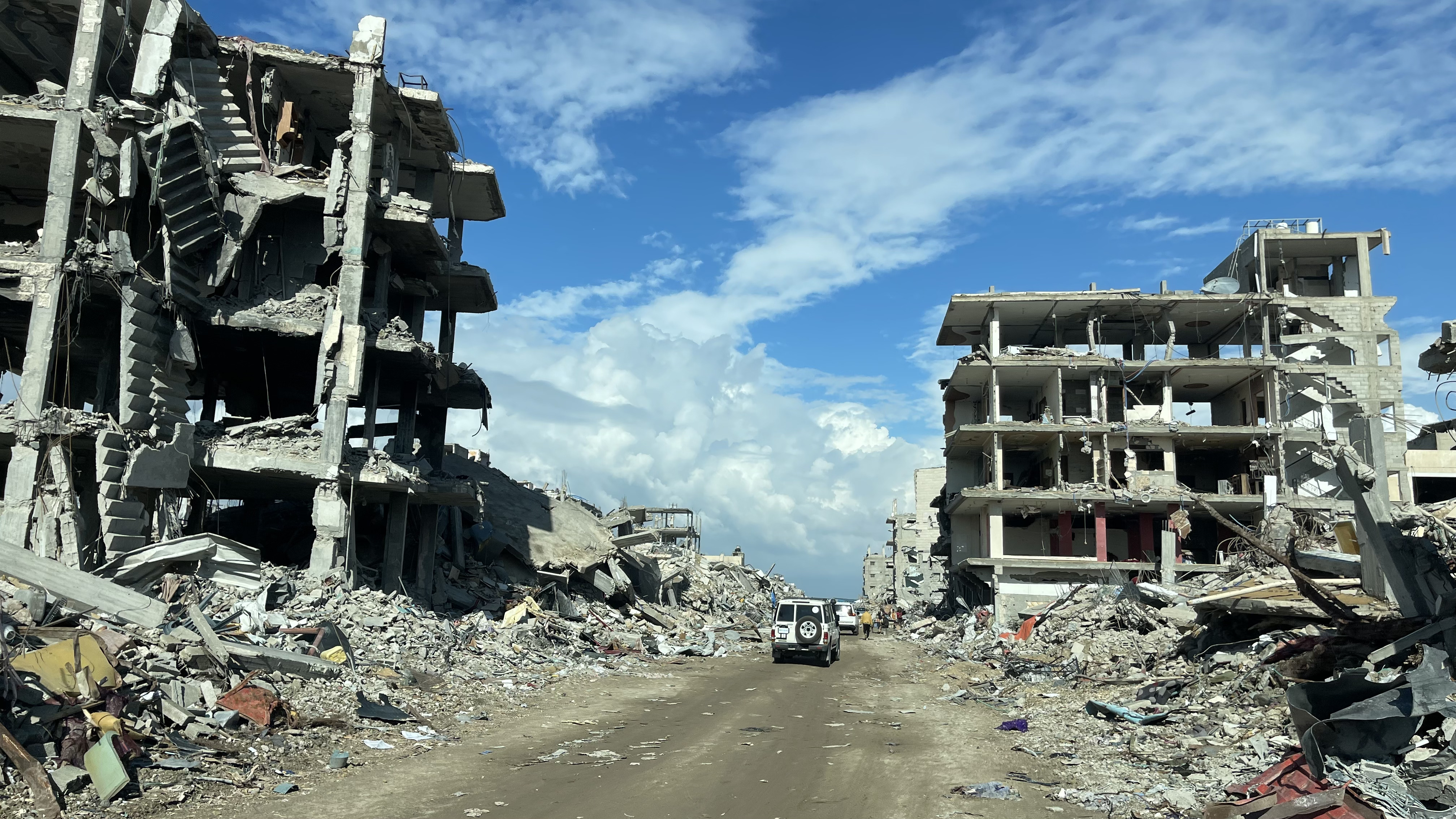
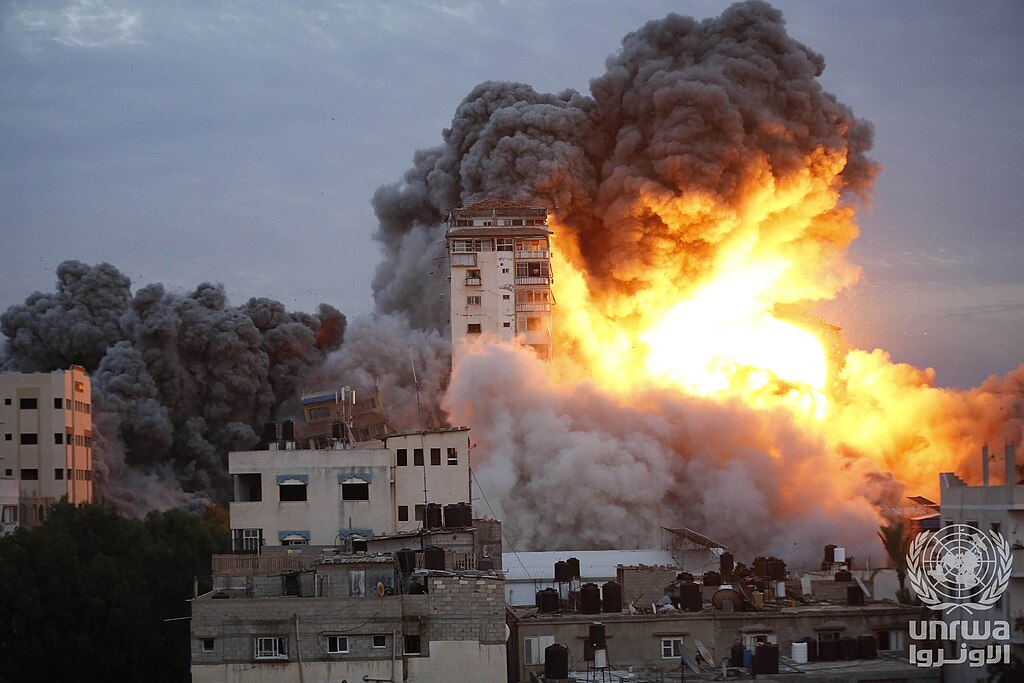
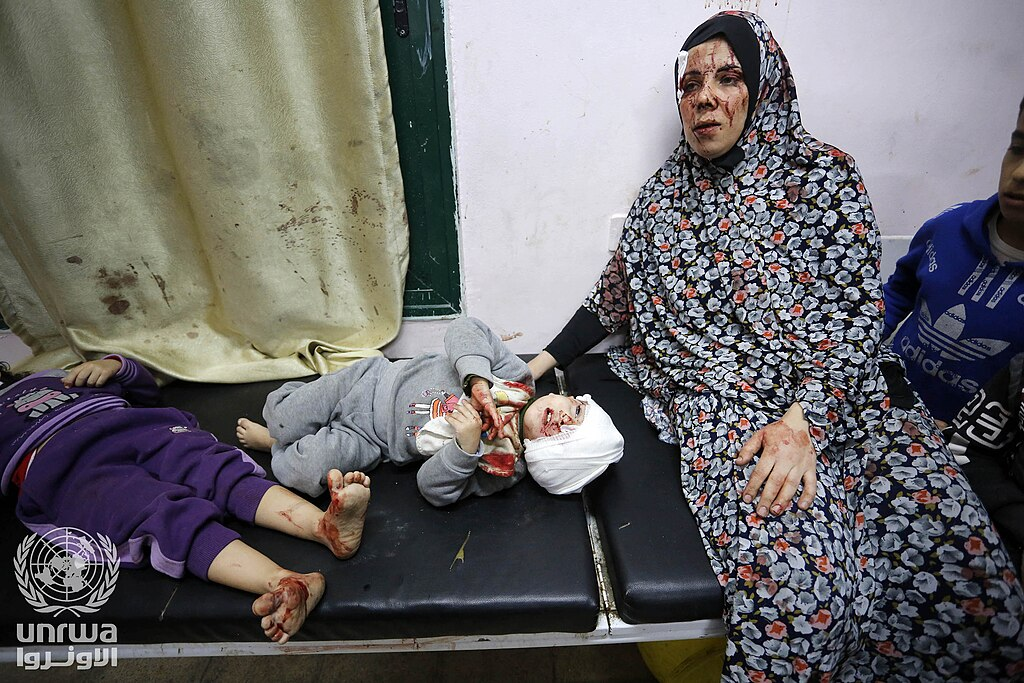
- From top to bottom, left to right: Aftermath of bombing (2025); Residential tower destroyed (8 October 2023); Injured Palestinians (Nuseirat airstrike, 20 November 2023)
- Location: 31°27′00″N 34°24′00″E; Gaza Strip, Palestine
- Date: 7 October 2023 – present (3 years, 1 month, 1 week and 2 days)
- Attack type: Bombardment
- Deaths: 73,000+ (Note: The casualty numbers are provided by Gaza Health Ministry)
- Injuries: 174,000+
- Perpetrator: Israel: Israeli Air Force
- Charges: War crimes, genocide

The Israeli Air Force has conducted numerous concerted aerial bombardment campaigns on the Gaza Strip during the Gaza war. Since the de jure enactment of a ceasefire in October 2025, strikes have continued but have become less frequent.

The bombing, combined with other simultaneous Israeli military actions in Gaza, killed at least 72,000 Palestinians (mostly civilians), which is between 3% and 4% of the total population of the territory, and damaged or destroyed Palestinian schools, hospitals, mosques, churches, and other civilian infrastructure including refugee camps.

Israel said the bombing was targeted, and by October 2024, Israel said it bombed 40,000 targets in the Gaza Strip. According to Israeli military intelligence members, when targeting software identified specific operatives suspected to be in the military wing of Hamas or Palestinian Islamic Jihad, the target was usually attacked in the target's family home.

By one estimate, as of April 2024 the bomb tonnage dropped on Gaza was more than 70,000 tonnes, surpassing the combined bomb tonnage dropped on Dresden, Hamburg, and London in World War II. Satellite imagery showed at least 69% of all buildings were damaged or destroyed, which surpasses the scale of destruction in Cologne and Dresden and approaches that of Hamburg during World War II. An analysis in The Lancet concluded that, as of January 2025, official figures significantly under-report mortality; the analysis estimated 64,260 deaths from traumatic injury up to 30 June 2024, and when extended to October 2024 likely exceeding 70,000. The recorded death toll, per the Gaza Health Ministry and as of August 2026, is over 73,000, not including those missing and presumed dead. Researchers have estimated the percentage of civilians among the fatalities at not less than 80%.

The aerial bombing and artillery shelling campaign has been accompanied or followed by destruction of infrastructure by other means. Areas including Rafah have been razed to the ground in a planned way, by means of controlled demolitions and bulldozing.

Israel has faced accusations of war crimes and genocide due to the large number of civilian casualties and the large percentage of civilian infrastructure destroyed. Israel ordered civilians evacuate, and threatened that civilians who did not evacuate would be considered "an accomplice in a terrorist organisation", thus implying legitimacy for their bombing. (Note: According to the Goldsmith's College research team Forensic Architecture, rather than preventing civilian casualties, Israel's evacuation system had instead "produced mass displacement and forced transfer, and contributed to the killings of civilians throughout Gaza".) Israel stated that its struck targets were used by Hamas, but an Airwars analysis did not find evidence of militant presence in most Israeli airstrikes in October 2023. The United Nations reported that 86% of the Gaza Strip was under Israeli evacuation orders. Satellite data analysis indicated that 80% of the buildings in northern Gaza had been damaged or destroyed. (Note: In northern Gaza, including Gaza City, the number of buildings damaged or destroyed is as high as 80 percent.) (Note: In October 2024, The New York Times estimated 168,000 buildings in Gaza had been damaged or destroyed.)

== Background ==
Israel's bombing campaign of the Gaza Strip began in response to the October 7 attacks. In prior conflicts — such as the 2014 Gaza War — Israel damaged or destroyed tens of thousands of buildings. The costs of rebuilding in prior conflicts have estimated to range in the billions of dollars.

Israel alleges that hospitals, clinics, mosques and schools are used for fighting, and also claims that ambulances transport combat equipment and militants throughout the Gaza Strip. Israel published videos from alleged interrogations of captured militants telling about the military activities in hospitals and ambulances, and other IDF videos show alleged use for weapons storage, and as access points to warfare tunnels. The IDF says that such military use is a breach of international law.

=== Airstrikes before 7 October in 2023 ===
In May 2023, airstrikes on the family homes of Palestinian Islamic Jihad members in the Gaza Strip killed 13 people, three alleged militants, and 10 civilian family members. Reports on the total number of dead ranged from 12 to 15. The dead included four women and four children. The airstrikes were in response to fire from Islamic Jihad, that was in turn in response to the death in Israeli custody of a member of their political wing, Khader Adnan. Israel claimed two of the men, Jihad Ghannam and Tareq Izzeldeen were responsible for attacks in the West Bank.

There were three days of Israeli bombing of the Gaza Strip in late September 2023. Dozens of people were wounded on the first day. Earlier that week Israeli forces shot protestors at the border, as they threw explosives at Israeli posts.

=== Munitions ===
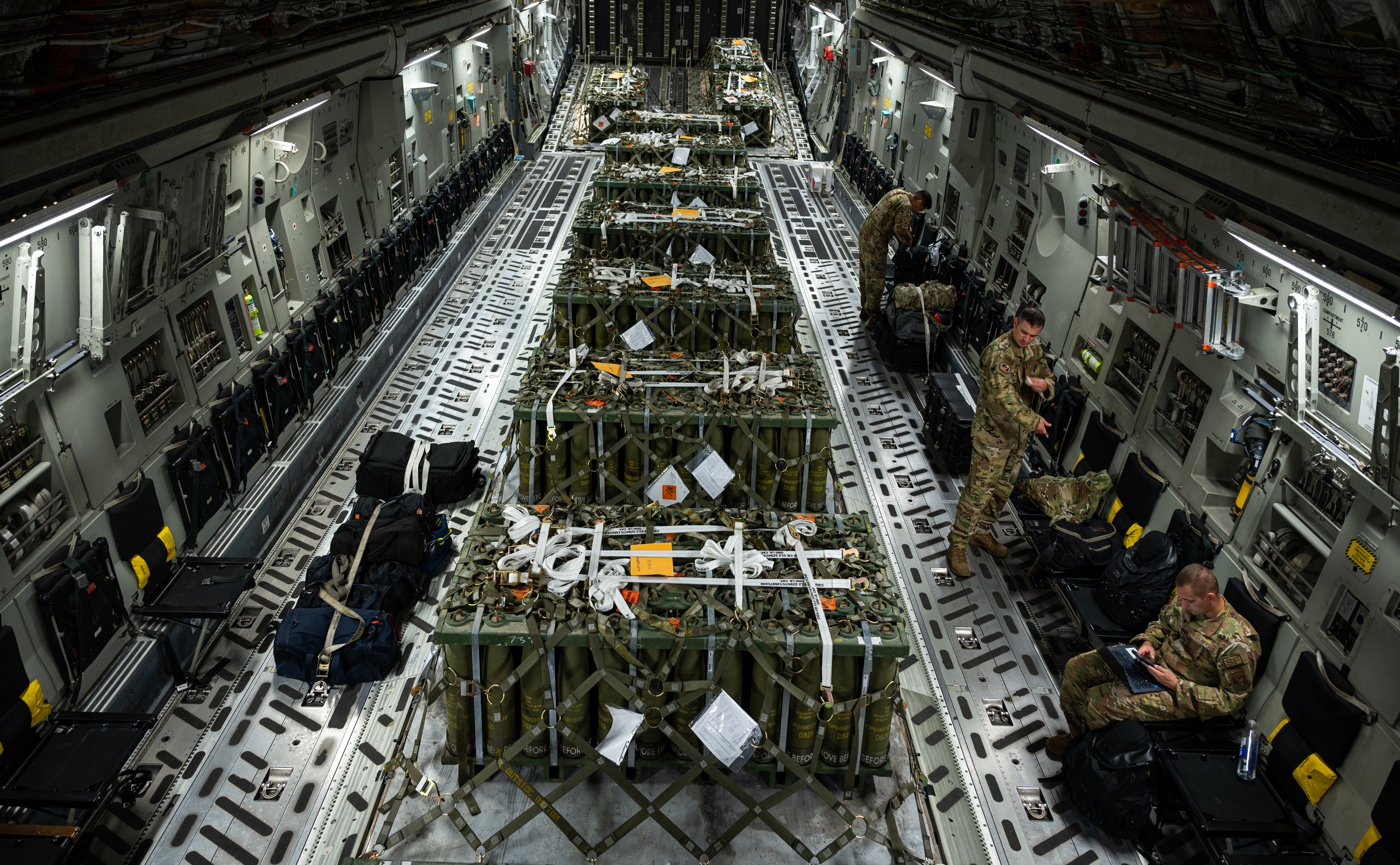
USAF airmen prepare for departure in a C-17 Globemaster III carrying ammunition to Israel, 15 October 2023, at Ramstein Air Base, Germany.

The Israeli bombing campaign has used mostly American-made bombs. From October 2023 until July 2024, the US has transferred more than 27,000 bombs to Israel. Although there was a pause of one shipment of MK-84 2,000 pound bombs, no significant change in the supply of the bombs happened since October.

Investigative reports by The New York Times and CNN have shown that the MK-84 bombs have been responsible to some of the deadliest attacks against Gaza civilians. Unlike the detailed information released for the shipment of weapons to Ukraine, the US government has revealed few details about the munitions sent to Israel. The bombs are provided from US's own stockpiles and the manufacture of new bombs was ordered from Boeing and General Dynamics.

== Attacks during the Gaza war ==
=== Medical facilities ===
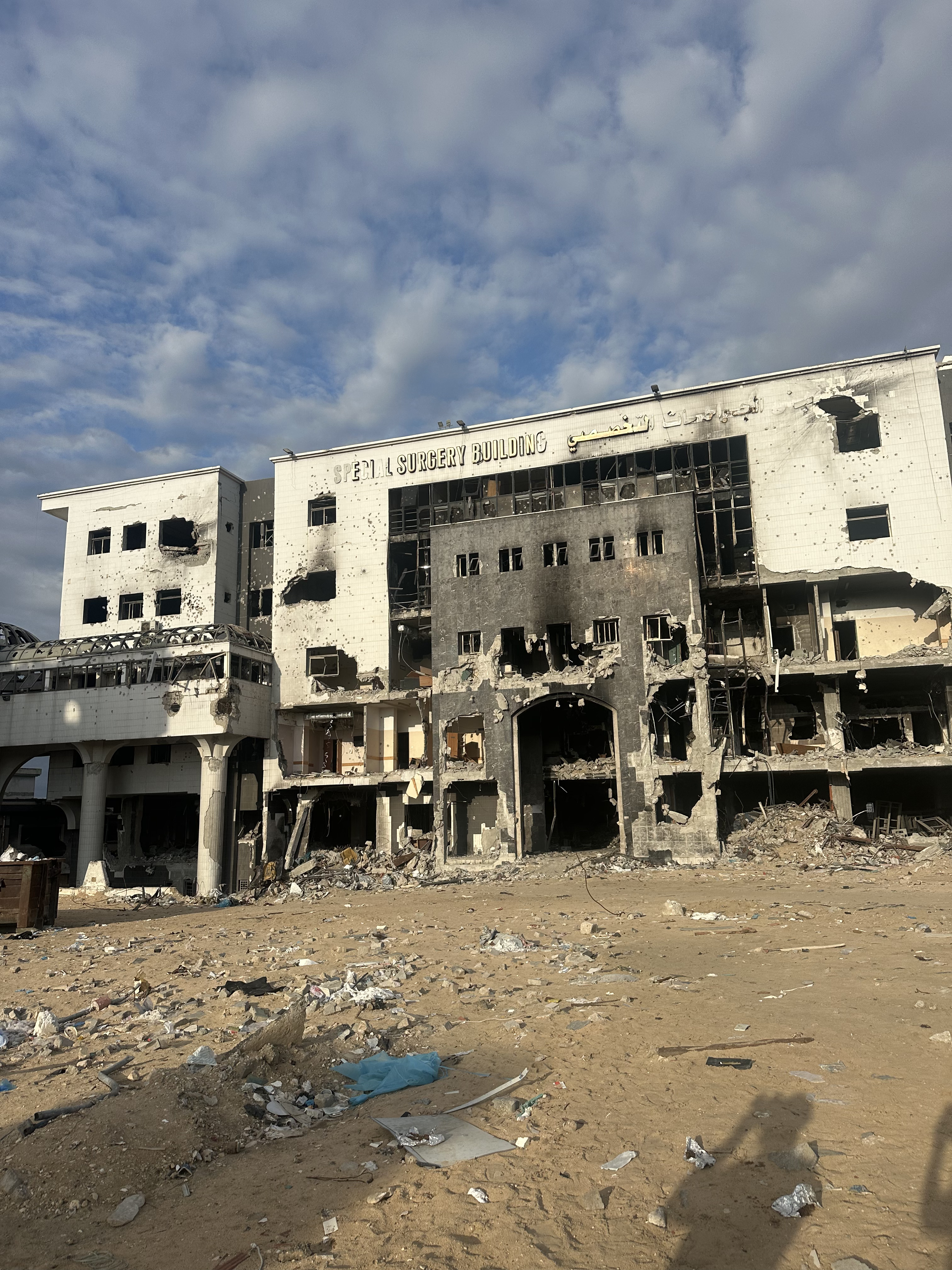
Al-Shifa Hospital in Gaza City, destroyed by Israeli bombing, 21 December 2024

Health officials and medical organizations in the Gaza Strip accused Israel of deliberately bombing ambulances and health facilities in the besieged enclave. And said that these attacks are considered a violation of international laws that include such attacks in the list of war crimes. The attacks on healthcare facilities contributed to a severe humanitarian crisis in Gaza. The Israel Defense Forces (IDF) accused Hamas of military operations inside hospitals, including alleged attacks on soldiers, weapon storage, fighters taking shelter, providing support for underground tunnels, human shielding, and holding hostages. Many of these claims, however, have been debunked under scrutiny from journalists.

By April 2024, 30 out of the 36 hospitals in the Gaza Strip had been bombed, according to Save the Children and UNICEF. Israeli airstrikes on medical facilities include the bombing the Turkish-Palestinian Friendship Hospital, the Nasser Medical Complex, a medical convoy at al-Shifa hospital, and the areas around the Al Shifa and Al Quds hospitals.

=== Refugee camps ===
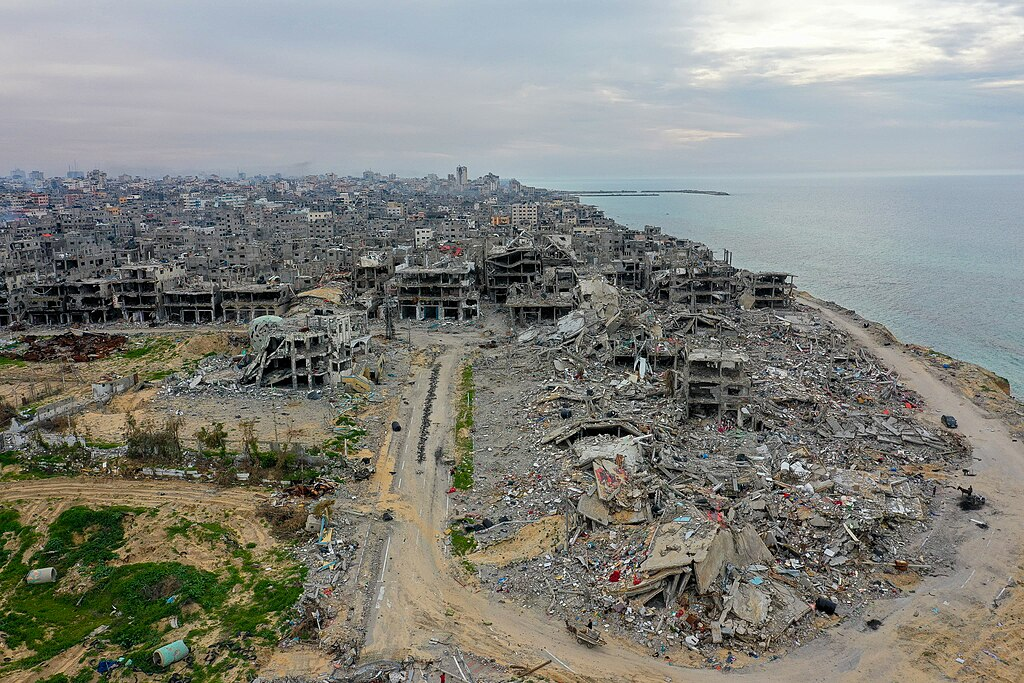
Ruins of Al-Shati refugee camp, Gaza City, 3 July 2024

In the Gaza war, as part of the bombing and invasion of Gaza, the Israel Defense Forces (IDF) has conducted numerous airstrikes in densely populated Palestinian refugee camps in both the Gaza Strip and West Bank.

On 23 October 2023, airstrikes killed 436 people in the Al-Shati camp and southern Khan Younis in one night. By 28 October 2023, the IDF bombed residential buildings in the Jabalia refugee camp without any prior warning, killing an estimated 50 people per hour. On 31 October 2023, an airstrike on the Jabalia refugee camp was described as a "massive massacre". On 13 November, an Israeli airstrike on the Jabalia refugee camp killed 30 people, with Gaza's civil defence team unable to rescue injured people from the rubble due to a lack of equipment. By 6 March 2024, aerial footage showed that the Al-Shati refugee camp, which had been one of the world's most densely populated areas before the war, was in complete ruins.

=== Schools ===
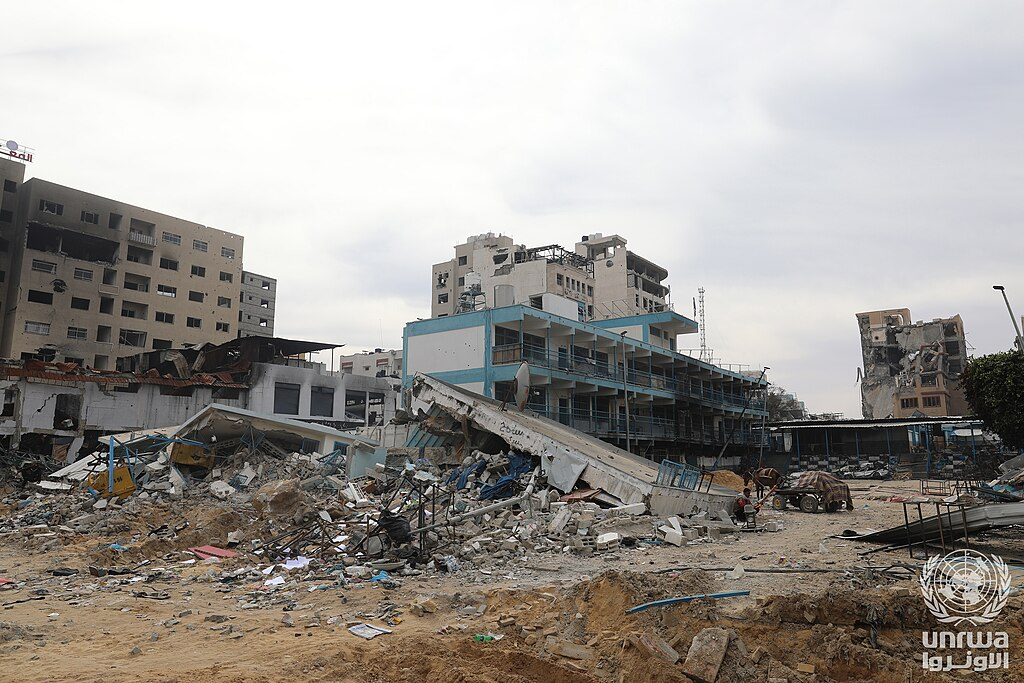
A destroyed UNRWA school in the Zaytun neighborhood of Gaza City in February 2024.

According to UNOCHA, 87% of schools in Gaza were hit or damaged between October 2023 and 2024. Similarly, The Intercept reported that 85% of the schools in Gaza had been bombed by October 2024. By March 2024, the United Nations had recorded 212 "direct hits" on schools in Gaza by Israeli bombardment, with at least 53 schools totally destroyed.

An airstrike at a UNRWA school killed at least six people. On 18 October 2023, the Ahmed Abdel Aziz School in Khan Yunis was hit. On 3 November 2023, the IDF bombed the Osama Ben Zaid school. On 4 November 2023, Israel bombed the Al-Fakhoora school, killing at least 15 people. On 5 November 2023, Israel bombed and destroyed Al-Azhar University.

On 17 November 2023, dozens were reported killed after an airstrike on al-Falah School in the Zeitoun neighborhood, south of Gaza City. A strike on the Al-Fakhoora school reportedly killed at least 50. Deaf, blind, and intellectually handicapped individuals were at particular risk of death by airstrikes. On 13 December 2023, a UNRWA school in Beit Hanoun was destroyed by an Israeli airstrike. On 10 August 2024, more than 100 Palestinians died in rocket attacks on Al-Tabaeen school.

=== Housing and infrastructure ===
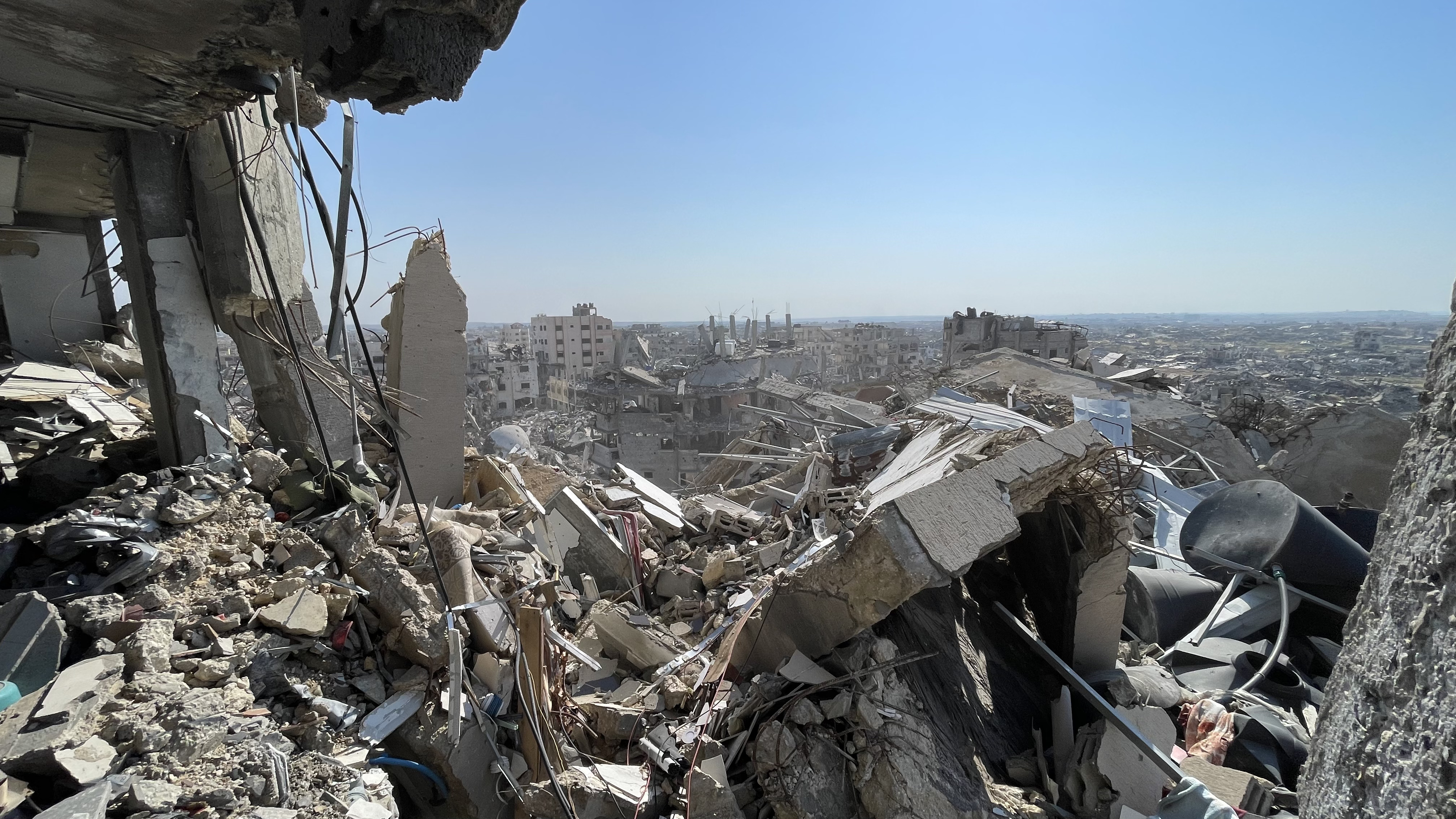
Destroyed houses in Gaza, 29 January 2025

On 16 October 2023, Israeli airstrikes destroyed a UNRWA humanitarian aid supply depot. The same day, airstrikes destroyed the headquarters of the Palestinian Civil Defence, an agency responsible for emergency response services, including firefighting and search and rescue. Journalists reported Israel was targeting solar panels and personal generators. On 15 November 2023, Gaza's last remaining flour mill was hit by an Israeli airstrike.

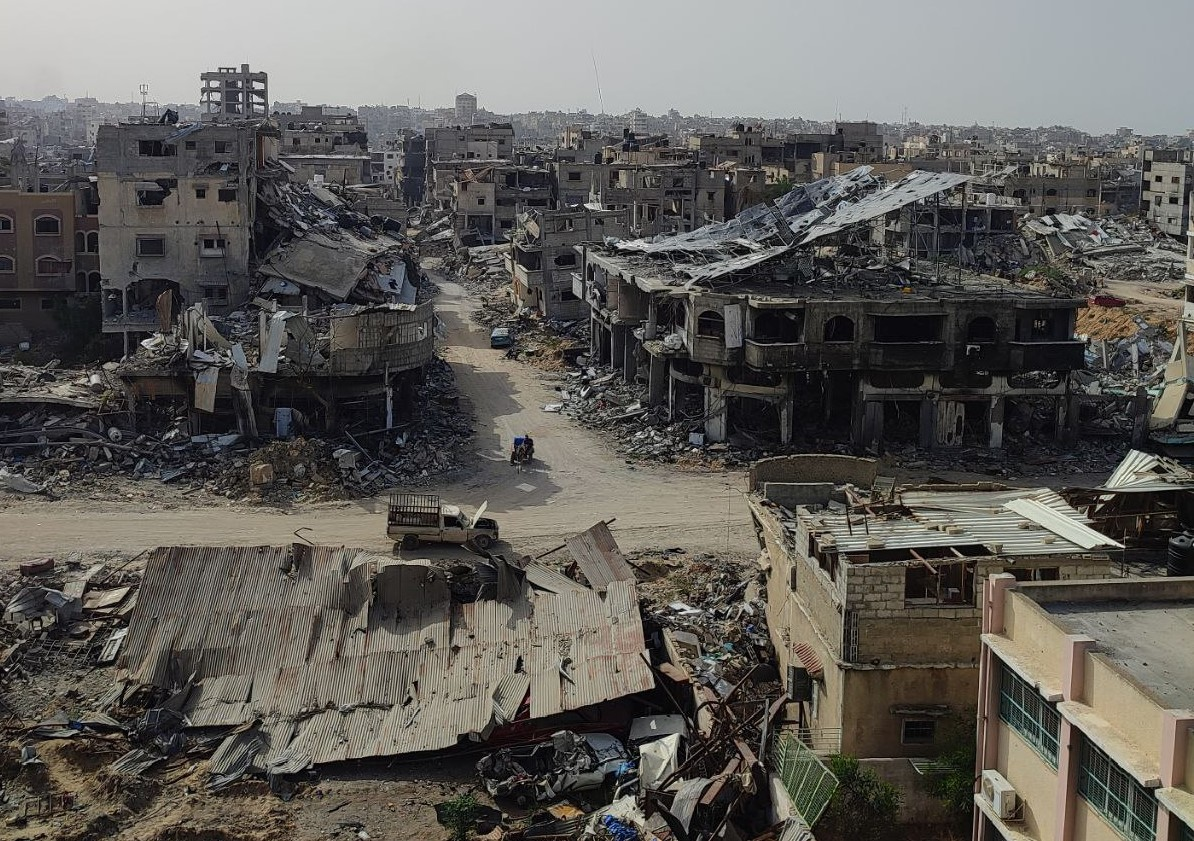
Khan Yunis on 11 June 2024

On 12 November 2023, Israel used earthquake bombs on an apartment complex in Khan Yunis, killing at least 13 people. Twenty-six people were killed in an airstrike of a residential building in southern Gaza on 18 November. By 28 November 2023, a United Nations (UN)-led consortium estimated 60% of all housing in Gaza had been destroyed. Numerous casualties were reported in an airstrike on a residential building near Nasser Medical Complex in Khan Younis, with hospital staff reporting having to bury 40 bodies on the hospital grounds. On 4 February 2024, two residential towers in Rafah were bombed, part of a series of strikes killing 127 people. 104 people were killed between 21 and 23 February 2024 in residential building airstrikes conducted without prior warning. In March 2024, a man in Gaza City described the situation there, stating, "Destruction on a massive scale, beyond any description. Our homes were destroyed. Nothing remained of our property".

In March 2024, a joint report by the EU, World Bank, and UN estimated 57% of water infrastructure was damaged or destroyed. Sewage overflowed as a result of the infrastructural damage. In May 2024, the Palestinian Central Bureau of Statistics and Ministry of Communications and Information Technology stated that 75% of Gaza's telecoms towers had been rendered inoperable by Israeli attacks. In June 2024, UNOSAT said that 57% of Gaza's agricultural land had been degraded by conflict.

=== Places of worship ===
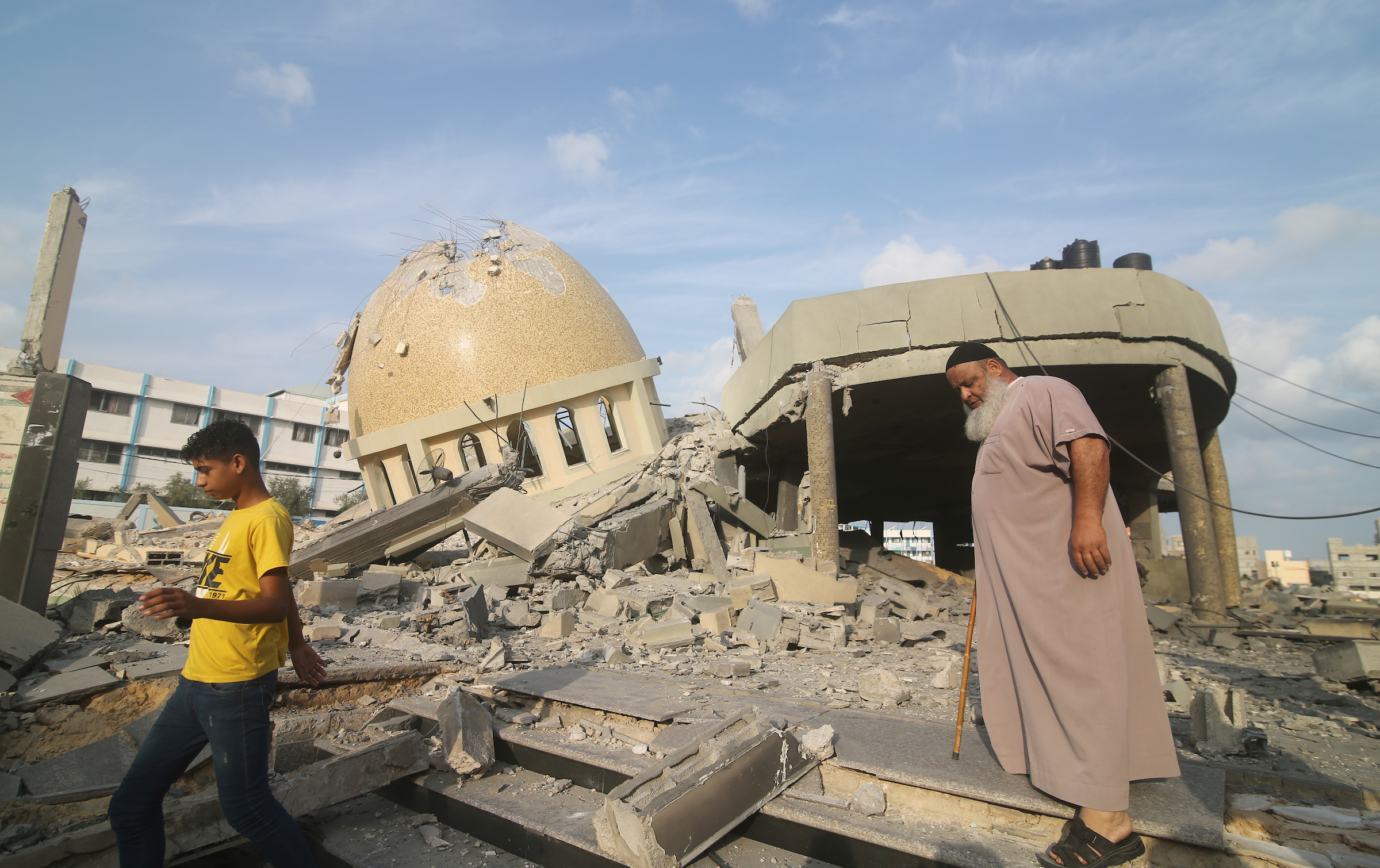
Mosque destroyed by an Israeli bombing in Khan Younis

On 19 October 2023, an Israeli airstrike hit the Church of Saint Porphyrius, where 500 people were sheltering. On 8 November 2023, Israel bombed and destroyed the Khalid bin al-Walid Mosque. By 13 November 2023, at least 60 mosques had been destroyed by Israeli bombs. In December 2023, an Israeli bombing destroyed the Great Mosque of Gaza. At least seven people were killed in an Israeli airstrike on a Rafah mosque full of displaced people on 23 February 2024. Five people were killed in a mosque in northern Gaza that was bombed without warning. The al-Riad mosque in Khan Younis was heavily damaged by an Israeli bombing on 9 March 2024.

By 10 March 2024, more than 1,000 mosques had been destroyed by Israeli attacks. In May 2024, an Israeli bombing on a mosque in Gaza City reportedly killed at least 10 people.

=== Safe zones ===
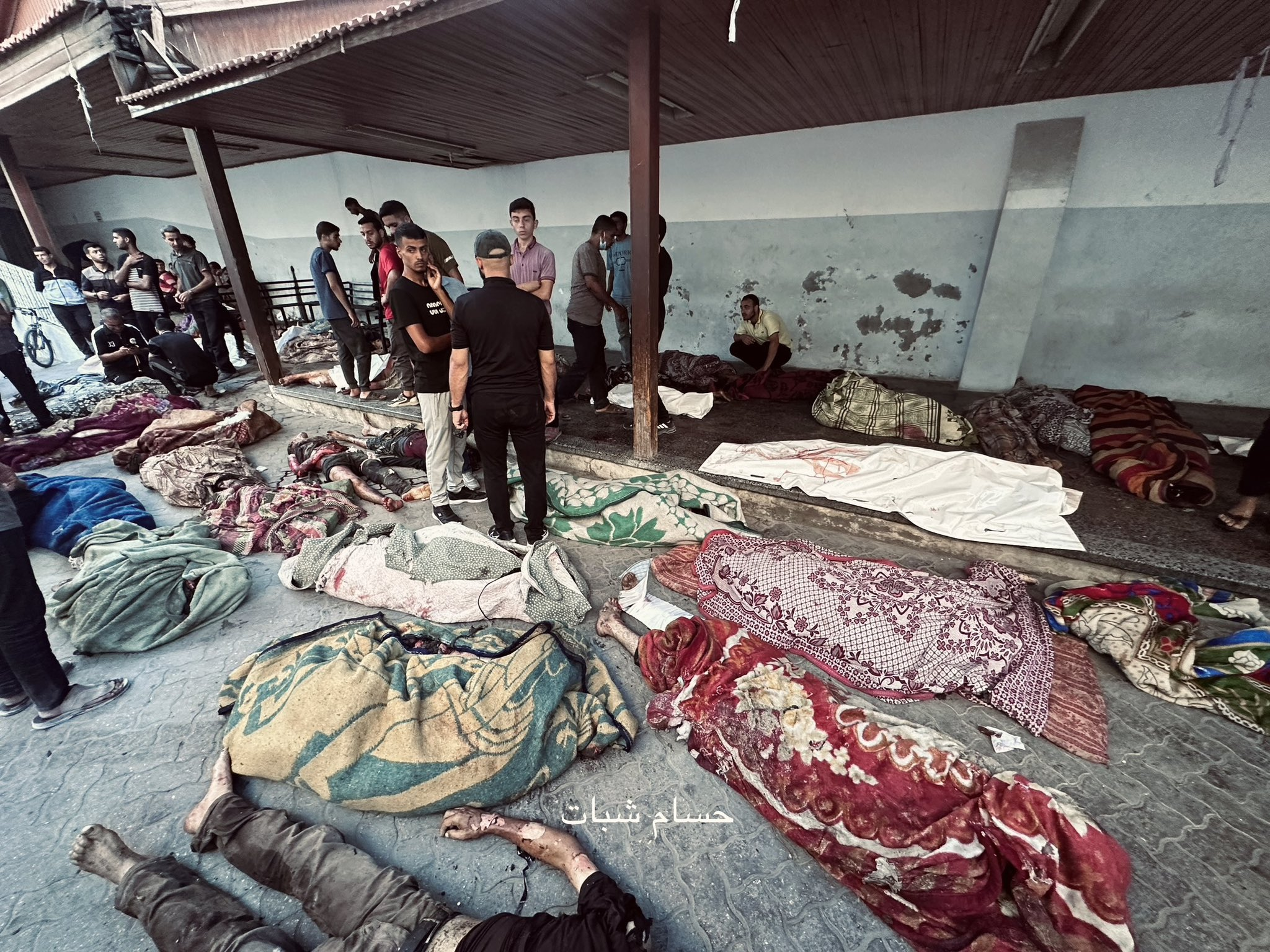
Victims of Israeli bombing of Al-Tabieen school where Palestinian refugees had come to seek refuge, 10 August 2024

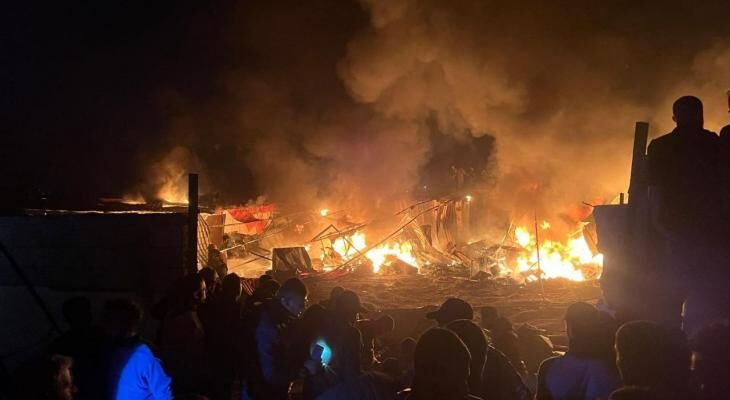
4 December 2024 Israeli air strikes on al-Mawasi, a designated evacuation and humanitarian zone in Khan Yunis Governorate

On 17 October 2023, Israel conducted intensive airstrikes in southern Gaza, in areas it told residents to seek refuge. Israel "pounded" areas in south Gaza it had declared as "safe zones", raising fears amongst residents that nowhere was safe. On 20 October 2023, Israeli continued to bombard south Gaza, and IDF spokesman Nir Dinar said, "There are no safe zones". Following Israel's evacuation orders for Palestinians to flee northern Gaza, the IDF intensified its attacks on southern Gaza.

Analyses by CNN, The New York Times, and Sky News all found that Israel had bombed areas it had previously told civilians to evacuate to. The Sky News investigation also concluded that Israel's evacuation orders had been "chaotic and contradictory", NYT found that Israel had dropped 2,000-pound bombs in those areas, while CNN stated it had verified at least three locations Israel bombed after telling civilians it was safe to go there.

On 5 January 2024, evacuees fleeing Israeli attacks in central Gaza stated the situation there was "hell on Earth". One survivor of an Israeli airstrike wrote, "Even though that air strike did not kill us, it destroyed something inside us." On 12 January, the UN Secretary-General for Human Rights stated that at least 319 internally displaced persons were killed and 1,135 injured by Israeli airstrikes while sheltering in UN shelters. After an Israeli bomb killed two sheltering in a tent in Deir el-Balah on 23 February 2024, a surviving family member stated, "It's just a tent. They are displaced and evacuated from the north here to seek refuge. They were sleeping. Why were they attacked? Even in tents, we are not safe." After a bombing on tents in Rafah killed 11 people, Director-General of the WHO Tedros Adhanom Ghebreyesus stated it was "outrageous and unspeakable".

== Casualties ==
More than 73,000 Palestinians have been reported killed by the Gaza Health Ministry. According to a January 2025 analysis in The Lancet, it is likely that the death toll due to traumatic injury that time exceeded 70,000. Of this total, it was estimated that 59.1% were women, children and the elderly, and researchers have estimated a civilian death toll of at least 80%.

=== Missing persons ===
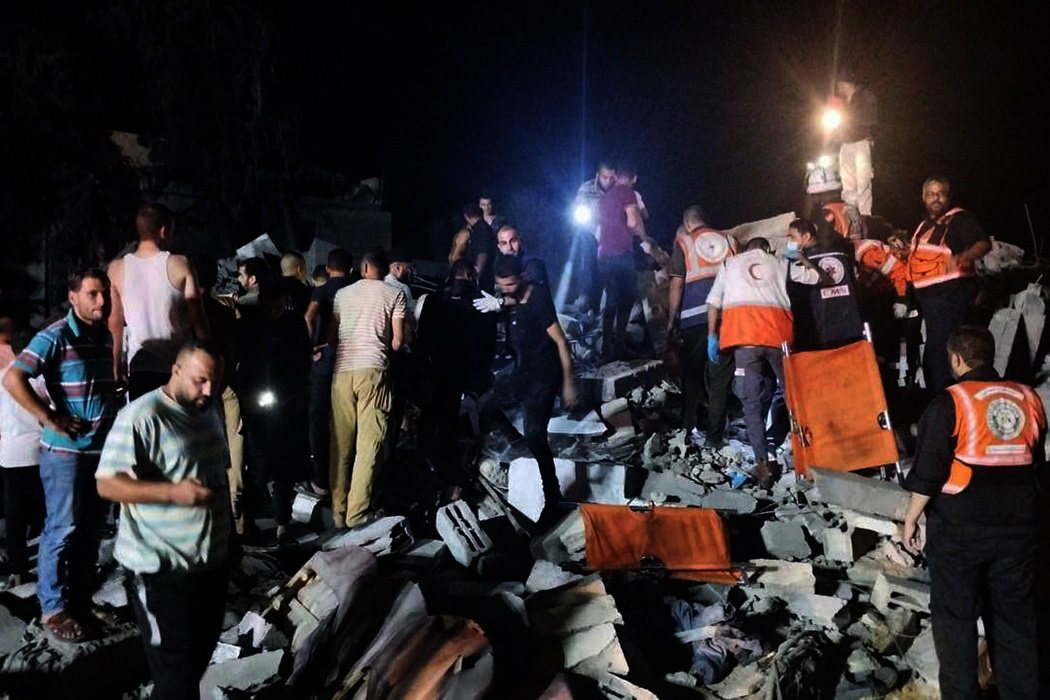
Rescue teams searching for survivors under rubble, October 2023

On 11 February 2026, roughly 8,000 people were reported missing beneath rubble. On 27 October 2023, the World Health Organization stated more than 1,000 unidentified people were buried under rubble. On 3 December 2023, the Palestinian Civil Defence stated the situation "beyond dire" as the organization was unable to rescue many people buried under rubble.

Individuals were rescued by aid workers after reportedly surviving several days buried underneath rubble. Emergency responders stated that part of what made rescue so difficult is that Israeli bombs tend to "flatten entire buildings". On 24 February 2024, Dr. Paul B. Spiegel stated that total death counts were undercounts due to the large number of people under rubble, stating, "We projected the number of deaths that may be missing, and it was probably up to about ten to fifteen per cent more." On 26 February 2024, Israeli warplanes bombed and destroyed an emergency rescue machinery in Beit Lahia.

According to The New York Times, "The buried make up a shadow death toll in Gaza, a leaden asterisk to the health ministry's official tally of more than 31,000 dead". In May 2024, a U.S. doctor described the deterioration of rescue operations in Gaza, stating, "We hear bombs and before my thought used to be 'what patients are we going to meet tomorrow?' And now we hear bombs and no one comes." The United Nations stated that more than 10,000 people were estimated to be buried under the rubble. Dr. Marwan al-Hams stated the number was so high because of the lack of heavy equipment or fuel to dig through concrete and steel to rescue them.

In late-June 2024 it was reported by Save the Children that up to 21,000 children are estimated to be missing due to the bombing and the ongoing war. While the organization acknowledged that it was difficult to collect and verify information in Gaza, it was believed that about 17,000 children were unaccompanied and separated, about 4,000 likely missing in the rubble and an unknown number in mass graves. In July 2024, emergency crews stated there were many people trapped under debris in the Tel al-Hawa neighborhood following heavy attacks by Israel.

=== Comparison with Israeli bombing of the Gaza Strip in 2012, 2014 and 2021 ===
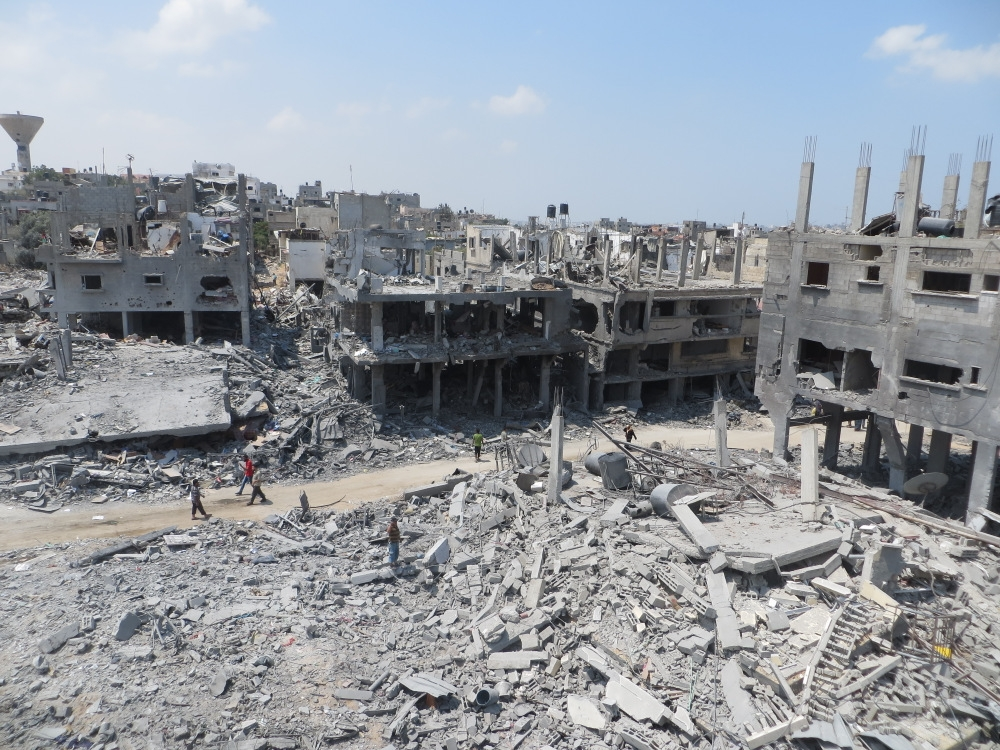
Ruins of Beit Hanoun in 2014, following Israeli bombing

An investigation by British NGO Action on Armed Violence in November 2023 compared the airstrikes beginning in October 2023 with previous Israeli campaigns in 2012, 2014 and 2021, and determined that the 2023 death toll was several times greater, stating: "Each airstrike causing civilian casualties in 2023's Operation Swords of Iron produced just over 10 fatalities on average, compared to 1.3, 2.5 and 1.7 per fatal bombing in those previous bouts of bombing." Human Rights Watch reported that in both the prior conflicts and since October 2023 Israeli airstrikes caused extensive civilian deaths and injuries, at times eliminating whole families, despite no observable military targets nearby. High-rise residential and commercial towers in Gaza were also struck and destroyed.

== AI-assisted targeting ==
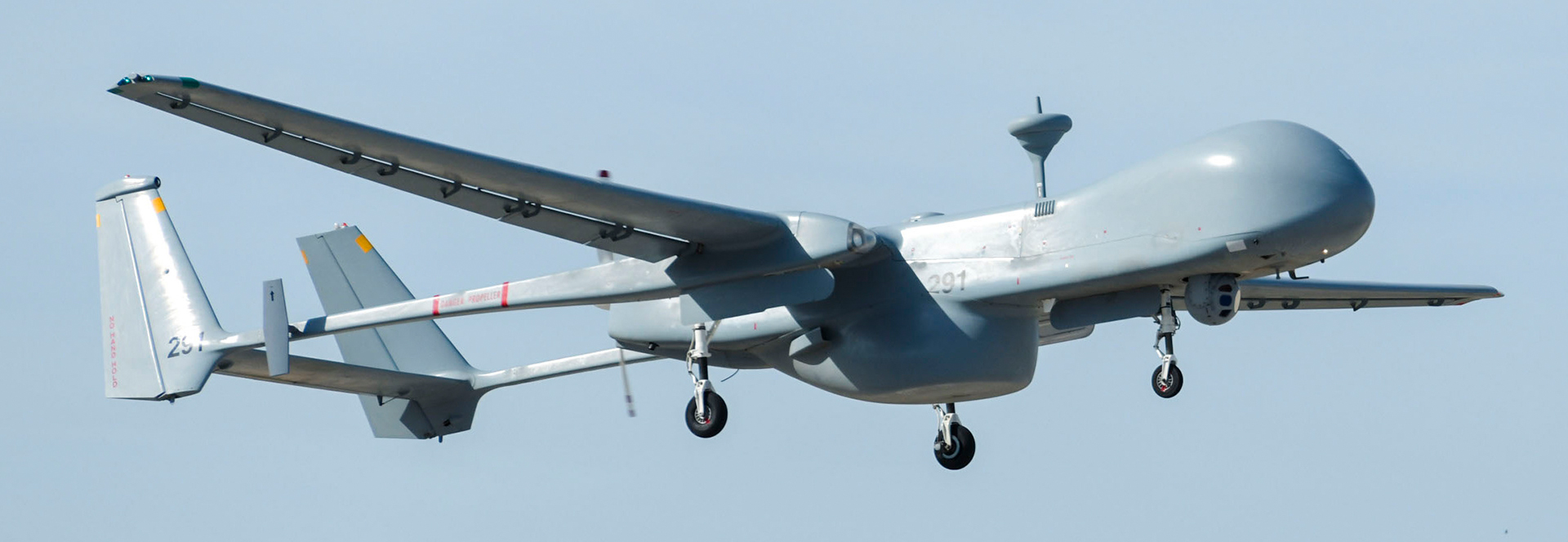
Israeli military drone IAI Heron, used to monitor, target and bomb buildings or individuals

During the bombing campaign, Israel used artificial intelligences to determine what targets the Air Force would bomb. A system known as Habsora, "the Gospel", would automatically provide a targeting recommendation to a human analyst, who would decide whether to pass it along to soldiers in the field. The recommendations can be anything from individual fighters, rocket launchers, Hamas command posts, to private homes of suspected Hamas or Islamic Jihad members. This would automate most of the target selection process.

NPR cited Anthony King, professor of defense and security studies at the University of Exeter, as saying this may be the first time AI-generated targets are being rolled out on a large scale to try and influence a military operation.

== Timeline ==
=== October 2023 ===
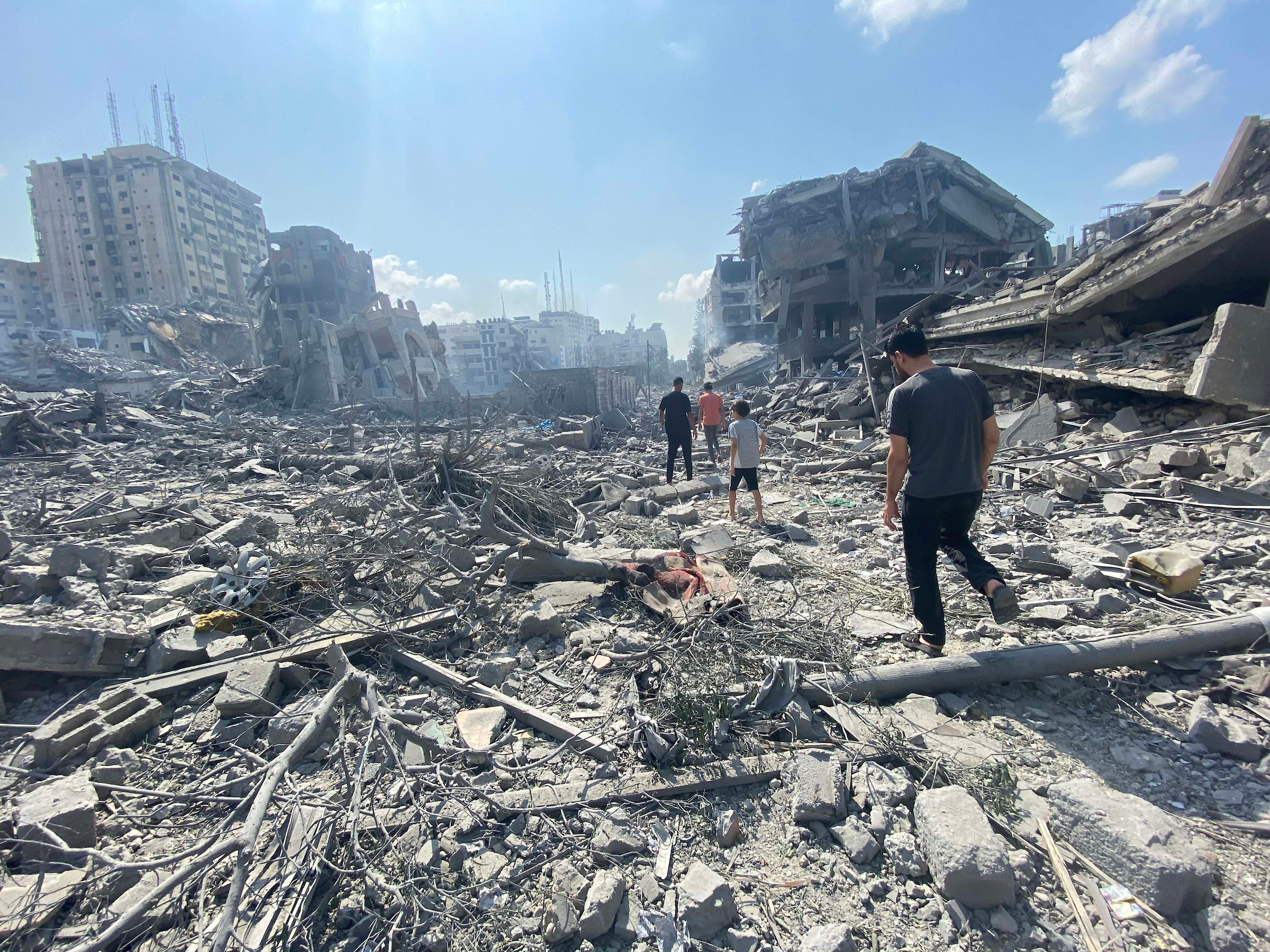
The Rimal neighborhood in Gaza City after an Israeli bombardment on 9 October 2023, the third day of the conflict

- 15 October: In the war's first week, Israel dropped more than 6,000 bombs on Gaza.
- 16 October: Airstrikes had killed 2,750 people, including more than 700 children, and wounded nearly 10,000.
- 18 October: The death toll in Gaza had risen to 3,478.
- 19 October: U.S. officials reported alarm at Israeli comments about the "inevitability" of civilian casualties and reminders about "civilian deaths from the U.S. atomic bombs" in Hiroshima and Nagasaki.
- 21 October: Israel intensified its airstrikes in advance of an expected ground invasion.
- 26 October: Israeli PM Benjamin Netanyahu stated Israel had "already eliminated thousands of terrorists – and this is only the beginning".

=== November 2023 – January 2024 ===
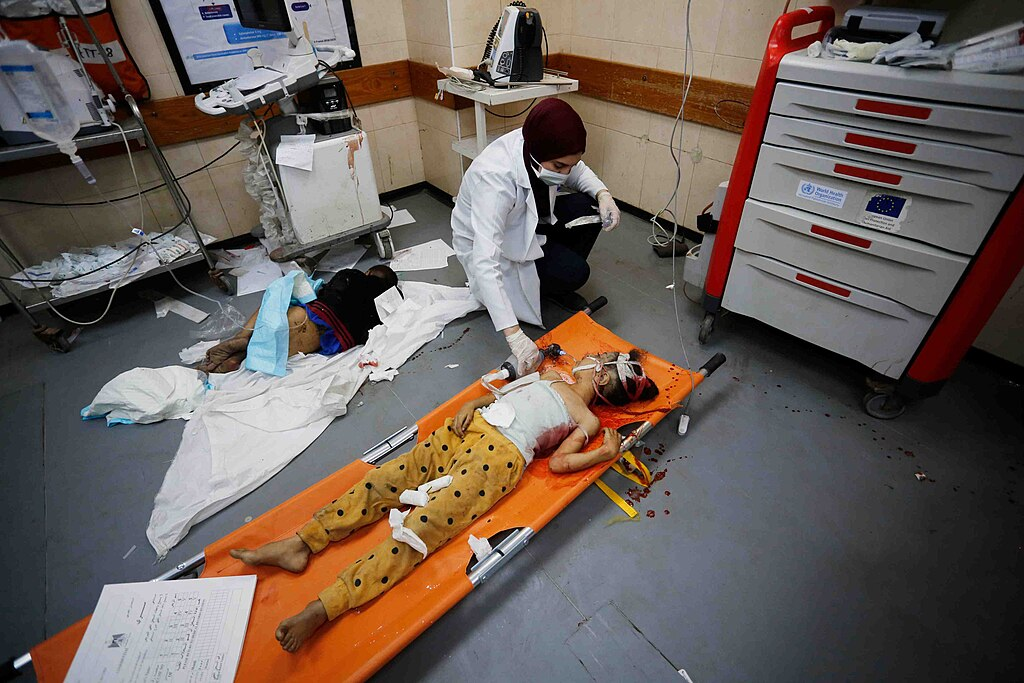
Palestinian children injured by an Israeli bombing on Gaza Strip, Shuhada al-Aqsa Hospital, 24 November 2023

- 17 November: Historian Raghu Karnad cited reports that Israel had dropped 25,000 tonnes of explosives on Gaza since the beginning of the conflict, stating this was the equivalent of two nuclear bombs.
- 20 November: Satellite imagery showed half of Northern Gaza had been destroyed by Israeli airstrikes.
- 24 November: Israel intensified strikes across Gaza before the temporary November ceasefire.
- 26 November: Israel had dropped an estimated 40,000 tons of explosives on Gaza since the start of the war.
- 1 December: In the hours following the end of the temporary truce between Israel and Hamas, 109 people were killed by Israeli airstrikes.
- 2 December: The IDF stated it had struck at least 400 locations in Gaza since the pause had ended, including 50 in Khan Younis in Southern Gaza.
- 3 December: 700 were reported killed in the preceding 24 hours.
- 8 December: 350 people were killed in the preceding 24 hours.
- 9 December: the Palestinian Civil Defence stated it only had one operational rescue vehicle left in the entirety of Northern Gaza.
- 6 January: More than 85% of Palestinians in Gaza, or around 1.9 million people, were internally displaced.
- 14 January: Israel's offensive had either damaged or destroyed 70–80% of all buildings in northern Gaza.
- 30 January: At least half of all buildings in the entirety of Gaza had been destroyed or damaged.

=== February–April 2024 ===
- 1 February: The New York Times estimated that at least half of Gaza's buildings had been damaged or destroyed.
- 2 February: UNOSAT, the UN's satellite centre, found that 69,147 structures, or approximately 30% of Gaza's total buildings, had been damaged or destroyed by Israeli airstrikes, shelling, and demolitions.
- 6 February: Israeli bombing campaigns intensified in Central Gaza, as displaced people in Rafah grew fearful of an impending Israeli attack on the city.
- 1 March: Residents of the Nuseirat refugee camp stated that Israeli forces bombed the camp "without warning".
- 2 March: Zeitoun, one of the most densely populated neighborhoods in Gaza before the war, was in ruins, with one resident calling it "destruction on a massive scale beyond any description".
- 4 March: An F-16 bombed and destroyed a cemetery in the Jabalia refugee camp.
- 15 March: UNOCHA estimated that there were 23 million tonnes of debris in the Gaza Strip as a result of Israel's bombing campaign, which would take several years to clear.
- 21 March: UNOSAT stated 88,868 structures, or 35% of buildings in Gaza, had been destroyed or damaged.
- 31 March: The Wall Street Journal reported on a U.S. government memorandum indicating there is a lack of independent oversight to ensure U.S. intelligence is not used for airstrikes to kill civilians or damage infrastructure.
- 29 April: Bellingcat estimated 50% of buildings in Gaza were damaged or destroyed.

=== May–July 2024 ===
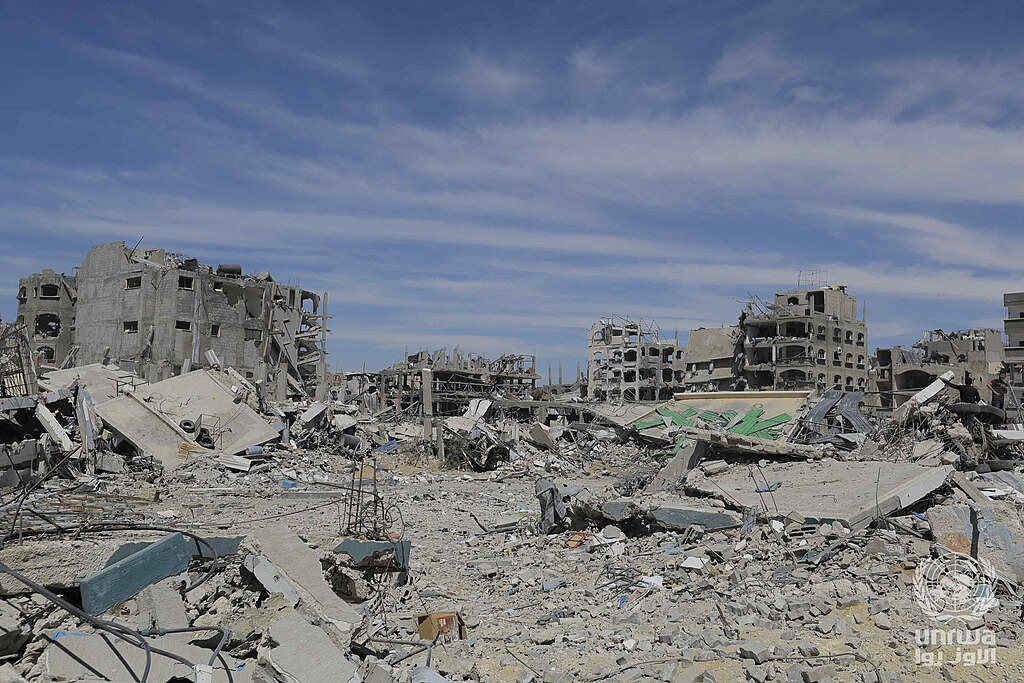
Ruins of Jabalia refugee camp, destroyed by Israeli army, 16 October 2024

- 3 May: The United Nations Mine Action Service estimated there were 37 million tonnes of debris containing around 800,000 tonnes of asbestos and other contaminants, and 7,500 tonnes of unexploded ordnance, which could take up to 14 years to clear.
- 3 June: UNOSAT estimated that 55% of all buildings had been destroyed, damaged, or possibly damaged.
- 27 June: IDF says 16% of Gaza buildings destroyed; disputes higher UN figures.
- 11 July: Gaza's Civil Defense Agency stated 85% of buildings in Shuja'iyya were destroyed, leaving more than 100,000 homeless.
- 17 July: An Israeli air raid destroyed the UNRWA headquarters in Gaza City.

=== August 2024–present ===
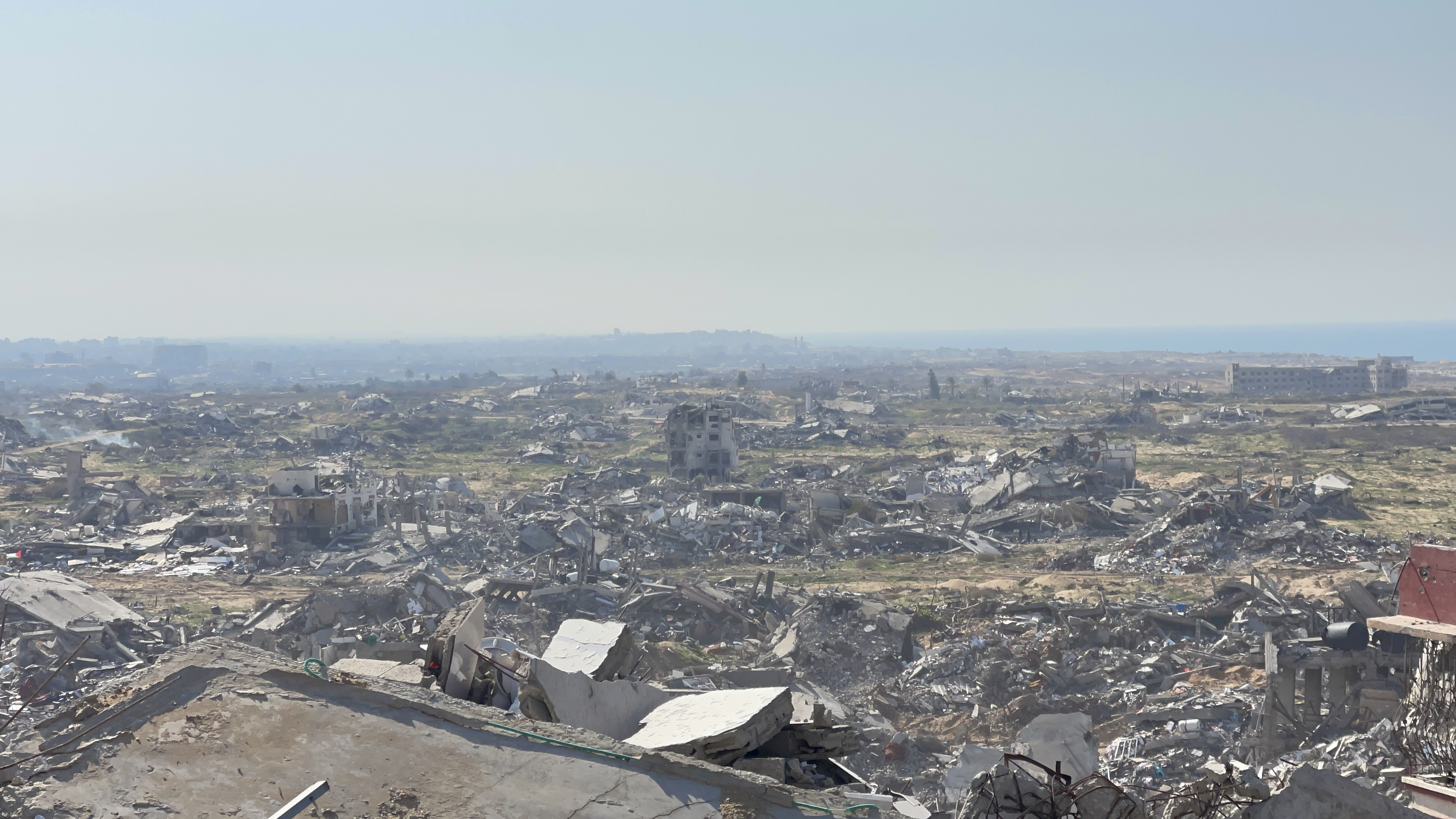
The Sheikh Ijlin neighborhood in Gaza City, razed by the Israeli army, January 2025

- 2 August: UNOSAT estimated that two-thirds of Gaza's buildings were damaged or destroyed.
- 8 September: An Israeli airstrike killed the deputy director of the Gaza Civil Emergency Service in northern Gaza.
- 3 October: UNOSAT and the Food and Agriculture Organization estimated 67.6% of croplands had been damaged.

== Reactions ==
The Financial Times described northern Gaza as a "bombed-out wasteland", and Palestinians feared northern Gaza was becoming uninhabitable. Israel's bombing was described as "unlike any other in the 21st century".

On 6 January 2024, the United Nations Under-Secretary-General for Humanitarian Affairs Martin Griffiths stated that Gaza had "simply become uninhabitable". James Elder, the UNICEF spokesman, stated, "I have never seen such devastation. Just chaos and ruin, with rubble and debris scattered in every single direction." Tor Wennesland, the UN special coordinator for Middle East Peace, stated, "Israel's use of explosive weapons in densely populated areas has destroyed entire neighborhoods and damaged hospitals and other civilian infrastructure, schools, mosques, and United Nations premises." In November 2024, Jan Egeland, the head of the Norwegian Refugee Council, stated during an interview with Christiane Amanpour: "Gaza is destroyed, there is no other way to describe it".

The EU's top diplomat Josep Borrell stated Israel's objective appeared to be making Gaza "temporarily or permanently impossible to live in". Mary Robinson, the former-president of the Republic of Ireland and leader of The Elders, called on the United States to cease providing bombs to Israel, stating, "Netanyahu is on the wrong side of history, completely".

On 10 July 2024, the Biden administration resumed shipments of the 500-pound bombs to Israel, which had been halted since May that year over concerns about the high number of civilian casualties in Gaza.

In response to the indiscriminate bombing, U.S. President Joe Biden noted that support for Israel was declining. Benjamin Netanyahu remarked, however, "You carpet bombed Germany, you dropped the atom bomb, a lot of civilians died." To which Joe Biden replied, "Yeah, that's why all these institutions were set up after World War Two to see to it that it didn't happen again". In the United States Congress, lawmakers Tim Walberg and Lindsey Graham supported the bombing and compared the situation to Hiroshima and Nagasaki.

In May 2025, Israeli Prime Minister Benjamin Netanyahu stated that the destruction of homes in Gaza would lead to the forced emigration of Palestinians.

=== Analysis ===
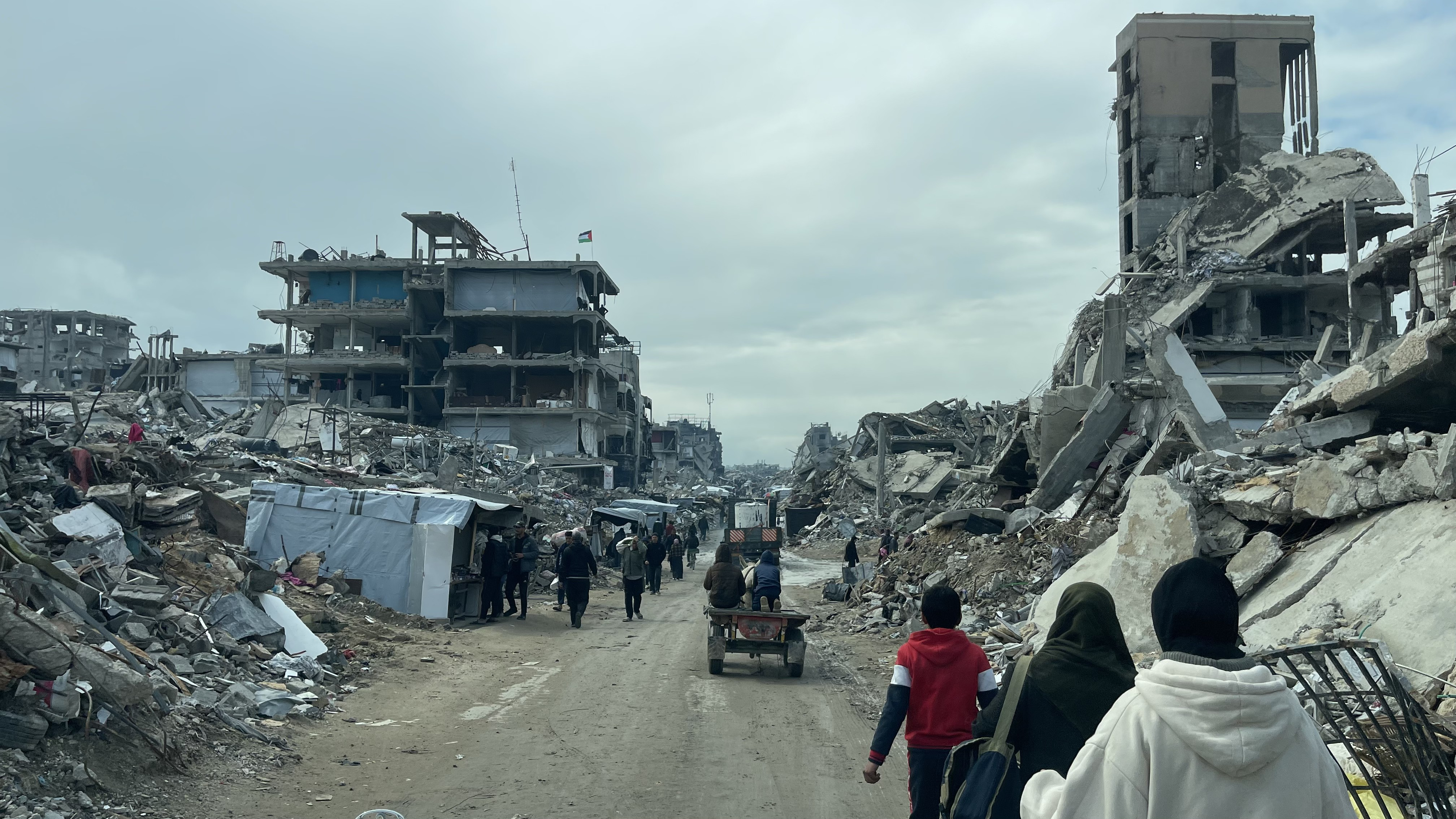
Palestinians in the ruins of Beit Lahia, February 2025

By October 2024, Israel said it bombed 40,000 locations in the Gaza Strip (which is 360 km^{2}). By one estimate, the bomb tonnage dropped on Gaza is more than 70,000 tonnes, which academic Robert Pape noted surpassed the combined bomb tonnage dropped on Dresden, Hamburg, and London in World War II. He also stated that "Gaza will also go down as a place name denoting one of history's heaviest conventional bombing campaigns." Satellite imagery showed at least 69% of all buildings were damaged or destroyed, which surpasses the scale of destruction in Cologne and Dresden and approaches that of Hamburg during World War II.

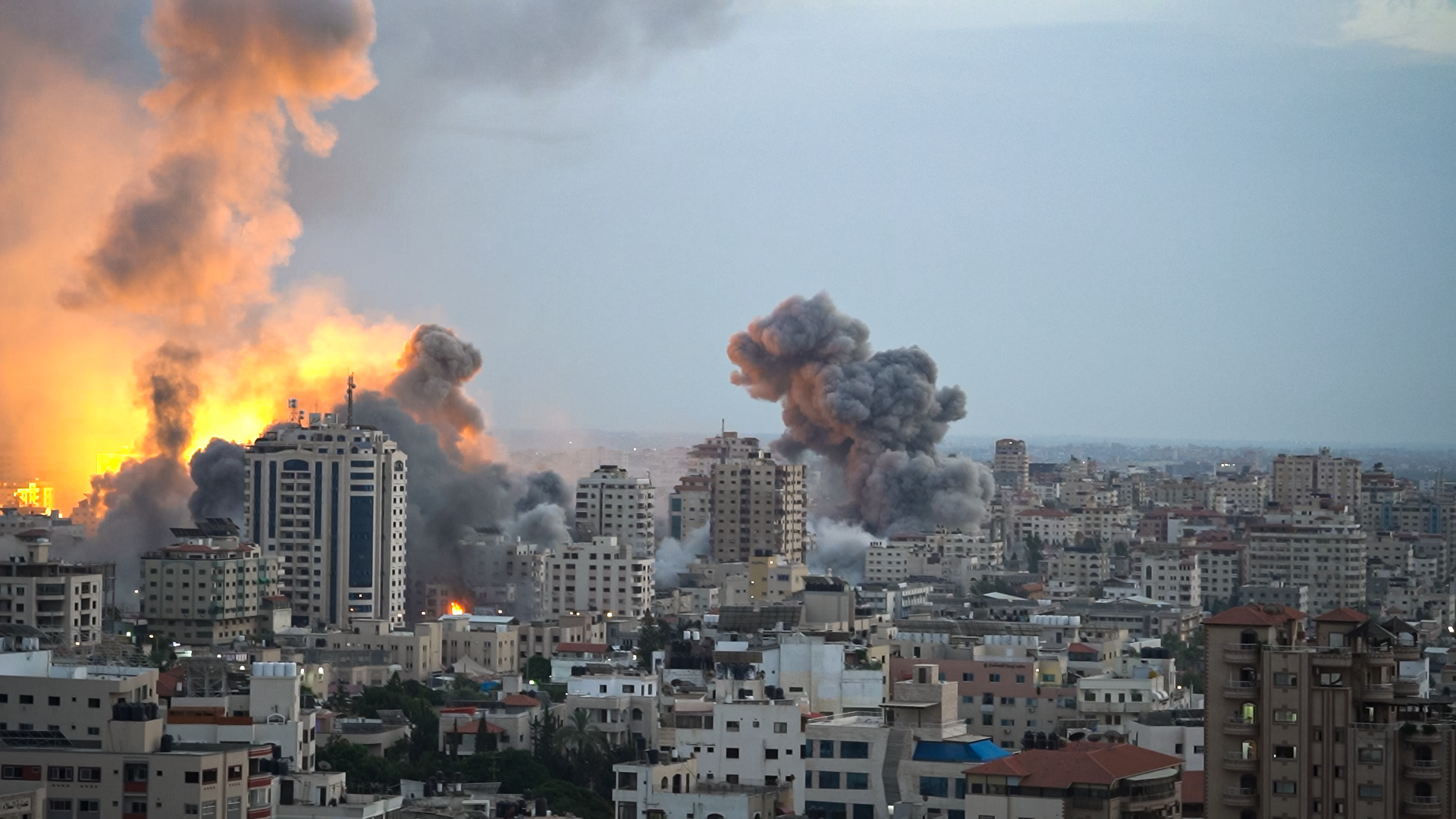
Israeli bombing of Gaza City

Scholars termed the destruction of Gaza a domicide, leading the UN special rapporteur on the right to housing to argue that international law should be amended to consider domicide a war crime. Israel's airstrikes were described as a carpet bombing and "indiscriminate". An US intelligence report found half of the bombs dropped on Gaza had been unguided bombs. Experts stated the bombing campaign against Gaza had been among the deadliest and most destructive in modern history, with Corey Scher of the CUNY Graduate Center saying that "Gaza is now a different color from space." Several months later, Scher, who was involved with mapping the destruction in Gaza, stated, "The rate of damage being registered is unlike anything we have studied before. It is much faster and more extensive than anything we have mapped".

The Wall Street Journal termed Israel's bombing the "most devastating urban warfare in the modern record". According to analysis by Humanity & Inclusion, approximately 45,000 bombs were dropped on the Gaza Strip in the conflict's first three months, but with a 9% to 14% failure rate, several thousand unexploded bombs lay amongst the ruins. The United Nations Mine Action Service estimated that there was more rubble in Gaza (25 miles long) than in all of Ukraine (600 miles long), with the rubble in Gaza likely "heavily contaminated" by unexploded ordnance. In June 2024, scholars referred to the bombing of Gaza as an example of urbicide, or the "deliberate, widespread destruction of the urban environment".

== War crimes ==
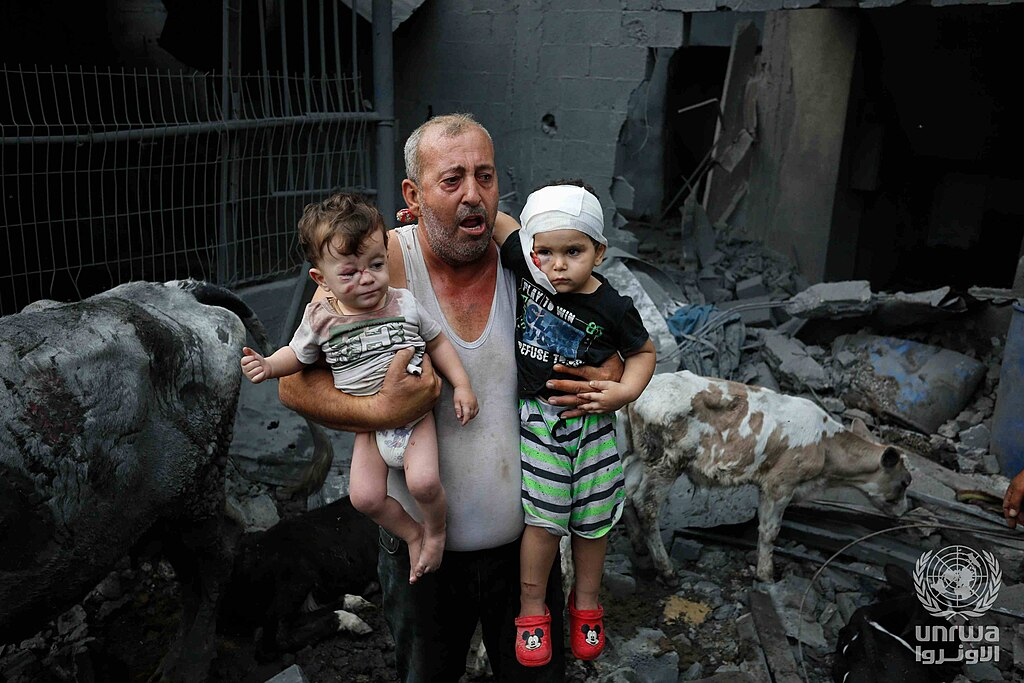
Palestinian refugee carries his injured grandchildren from the Israeli bombing of Nuseirat Camp, 28 October 2023

A group of UN special rapporteurs asserted that Israel's airstrikes are indiscriminate, stating that the airstrikes are "absolutely prohibited under international law" and amount to the war crime of collective punishment. Israeli military spokesman Admiral Daniel Hagari said that "while balancing accuracy with the scope of damage, right now we're focused on what causes maximum damage". A +972 Magazine investigation found the IDF had expanded authorization for bombing non-military targets. Research conducted by Dr. Yagil Levy at the Open University of Israel confirmed the +972 report, which stated Israel was "deliberately targeting residential blocks to cause mass civilian casualties".

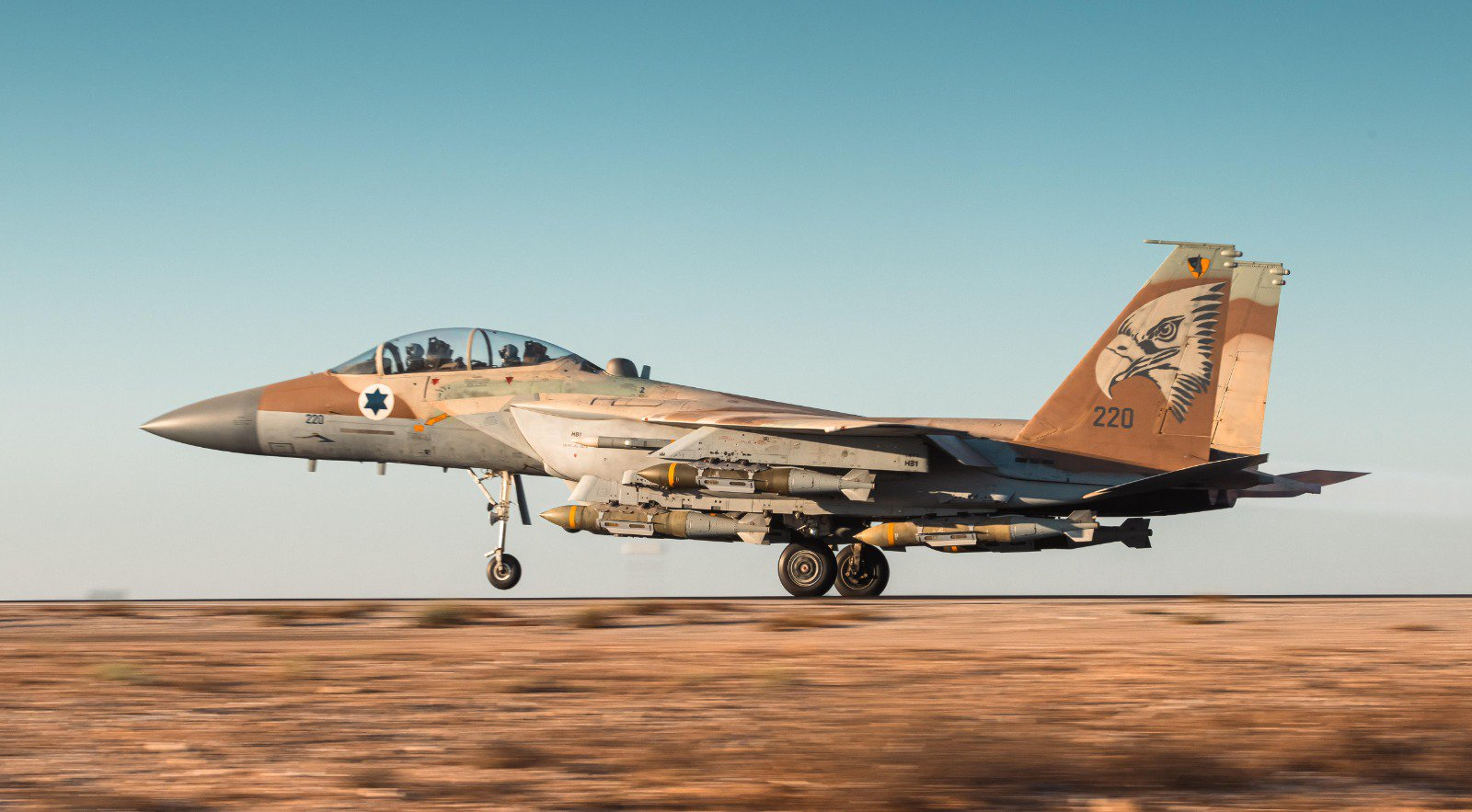
Israeli army F-15 fighter-bomber loaded with American bombs JDAM, 27 September 2024

During two airstrikes on 10 and 22 October 2023, the IDF used Joint Direct Attack Munitions (JDAM) in attacks described by Amnesty International as "either direct attacks on civilians" or "indiscriminate attacks". Marc Garlasco, a war crimes investigator, stated a JDAM bomb "turns earth to liquid". On 12 January 2024, the spokesperson for the Office of the U.N. High Commissioner for Human Rights stated Israel's attacks were failing to account for distinction, proportionality and precautions, thus leaving Israeli exposed to liability for war crimes. IDF has argued that it uses delayed fuzing, so that the bomb explodes underground and minimizes the blast and fragmentation; however, experts argue that delayed fuzing creates a new problem of leveling residential buildings, as was seen in the 31 October 2023 Jabalia refugee camp airstrike. This delayed fuzing "pancakes" buildings and endangers civilians in buildings nearby.

In February 2024, the IDF bombed and destroyed the Belgian government's Gaza development office. In response, Belgium recalled the Israeli ambassador and condemned the "destruction of civilian infrastructure" as a violation of international law. (Note: Two weeks after the bombing, the Belgian Minister of Development Cooperation Caroline Gennez stated Israel had still not responded to a request for an investigation.) Scott Lucas, a professor at the University of Birmingham, stated Israel's bombing campaign was in breach of the law of proportionality. In June 2024, the UN Human Rights Office published a report stating Israel's use of heavy bombardment raised "serious concerns under the laws of war". The head of an independent U.N. Commission of Inquiry stated Israel's use of heavy weapons in dense areas "constitutes an intentional and direct attack on the civilian population".

Attorney Dylan Saba argues that Israel's dropping of 2,000 lb bombs (each with a lethal fragmentation radius of 1,200 feet) in densely populated civilian areas is as indiscriminate as using chemical weapons. This is because such bombs kill everyone within their lethal radius, both militant and civilian, without distinction.

== Aftermath ==
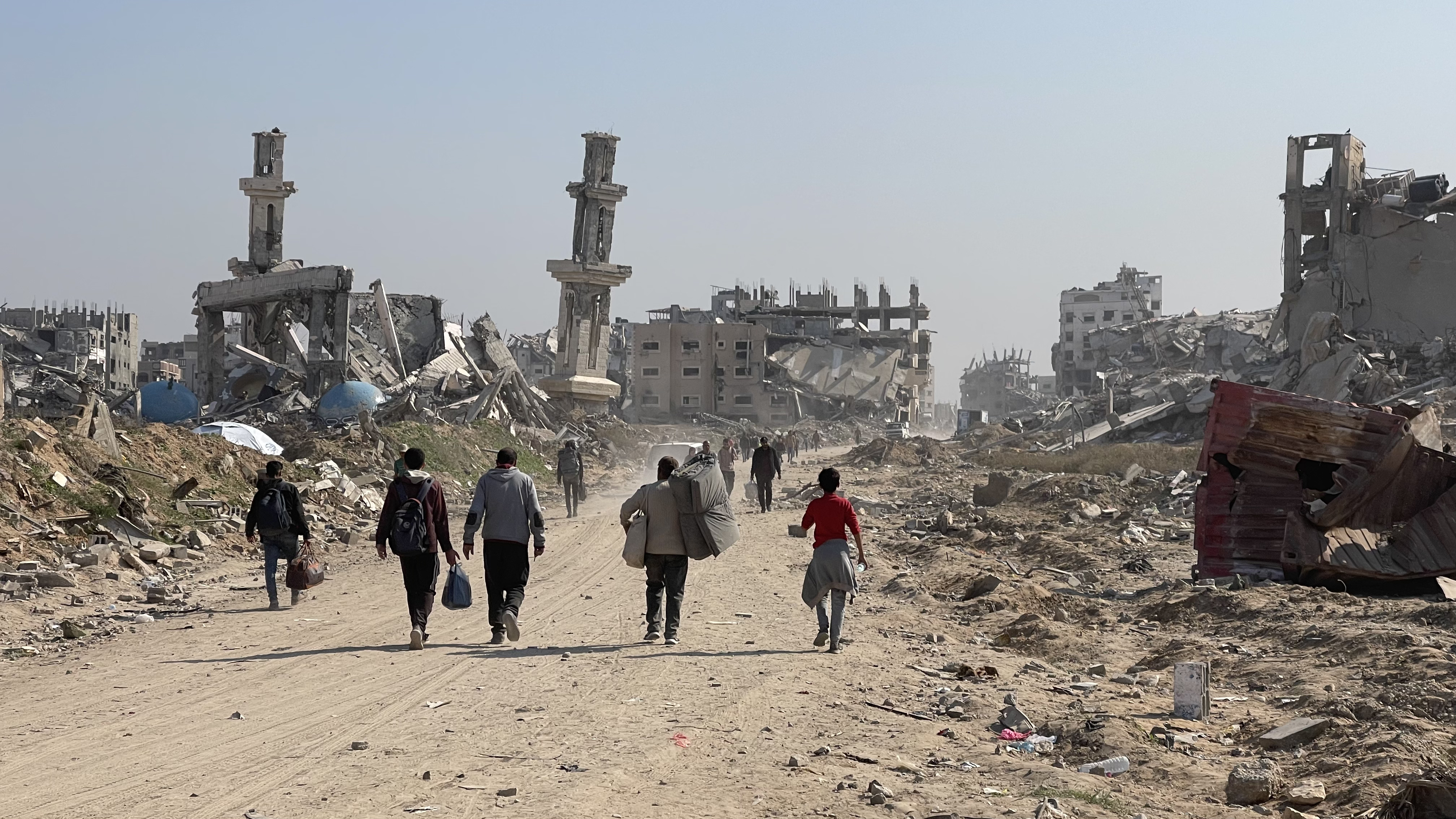
Forced displacement of Palestinians in the Gaza Strip devastated by Israeli bombardments, 29 January 2025

The bombardment left behind a large amount of debris, including unexploded ordnance. An official from United Nations Mine Action Service (UNMAS), has said it could take up to 14 years to remove the debris, including the rubble of destroyed buildings. As of June 2024, the war left an estimated 39 million tons of debris in a widely urbanized, densely populated area, according to the UN Environment Programme. This number had grown to 42 million tons by August 2024. In July 2024, UNOCHA warned of the "significant risk" of explosive remnants of war and unexploded ordnance on civilians in Gaza, citing multiple casualties caused by unexploded ordnance. In addition to fears about unexploded ordnance, health officials were concerned that Israel's bombing of buildings exposed civilians to highly carcinogenic airborne particles, including asbestos. A UN estimate found that clearing the 40m tonnes of rubble in Gaza could take as long as 15 years and cost between $500 and $600 million. The Norwegian Refugee Council further warned that when the war ends, half of all families in Gaza will be homeless due to the destruction of their homes.

According to the United Nations, the Israel military's destruction of infrastructure set back Gaza's human development by nearly 70 years.

=== Rebuilding ===
The Financial Times estimated it would cost billions to rebuild Gaza. Mohammed Mustafa, the chief economist of the Palestine Investment Fund, estimated rebuilding Gaza's homes alone would cost around US$15 billion. (Note: Mustafa became the prime minister of the State of Palestine in March 2024. As prime minister, Mustafa wrote an editorial in The Washington Post outlining a rebuilding plan for the Gaza Strip.) The World Bank and the United Nations estimated in April 2024 that the war had caused $18.5 billion worth of damage to Gaza's infrastructure thus far. In May 2024, the United Nations Development Program stated it would take at least until 2040 to rebuild the homes destroyed in Gaza. Mark Jarzombek, a professor at MIT, stated, "The cost of rebuilding will be prohibitive. Construction sites on this scale have to be empty of people, creating another wave of displacements. No matter what one does, for generations Gaza will be struggling with this".

== See also ==
- Dahiya doctrine
- Drone warfare
- Gaza genocide
- Israeli war crimes in the Gaza war
- List of companies involved in the Gaza war
- List of military engagements during the Gaza war
- Roof knocking
