= Al-Shati refugee camp airstrikes =

Airstrike in Gaza

- Part of the Gaza war
- Type: Airstrike
- Location: Al-Shati camp, Gaza Strip; 31°31′55.91″N 34°26′43.42″E
- Target: Al-Shati refugee camp
- Date: 9 and 12 October 2023
- Executed by: Israeli Air Force
- Casualties: 15+ civilians killed
- Location within the Gaza Strip

On 9 October 2023, during the Gaza war, the Israel Defense Forces (IDF) conducted an airstrike on al-Shati refugee camp in the Gaza Strip, destroying four mosques. According to Palestinian media, the attack killed people inside. The camp is Gaza's third-largest refugee camp, with a population of more than 90,000 refugees. A second strike was conducted on 12 October, killing 13 people.

== Background ==
The al-Shati camp was established in 1948 for about 23,000 Palestinians who fled or were expelled by Israeli forces during the 1948 Arab–Israeli War. It contains a sewage system, a health center and 23 schools (17 primary, 6 secondary). With an area of 0.52 km^{2}, as of 2023 it was one of the most densely populated places in the world.

== Airstrikes ==
Following Hamas' attack on southern Israel on October 7, Israel launched airstrikes at different areas in the Gaza Strip. In the al-Shati airstrikes, four mosques were hit, the al-Gharbi mosque, Yassin mosque, and al-Sousi mosque. All were destroyed according to satellite footage, and local news reported an unspecified number of people were killed inside. The Palestinian Ministry of Health described the situation as "a massacre".

According to a recording released by an IDF spokesperson, between two residents of the al-Shati, Hamas prevented civilians from leaving the area in order to use them as human shields.

On 19 October 2024, an Israeli airstrike killed at least 73 people at the Asmaa School, according to Gaza's Civil Defense.

== See also ==
- July 2024 al-Shati refugee camp attack
- June 2024 northern Gaza City airstrikes
- Attacks on refugee camps in the Gaza war
- Timeline of the Israeli–Palestinian conflict in 2023
- Timeline of the Gaza war (7 October 2023 – 27 October 2023)
- Israeli war crimes in the Gaza war
- Gaza genocide
