= Al-Shati refugee camp =

Palestinian refugee camp in the Gaza Strip

Al-Shati
- Refugee Camp

Arabic transcription(s)
  - Arabic: مخيم الشاطئ
  - Latin: mukhayyam ash-Shati (official); Beach camp (unofficial)
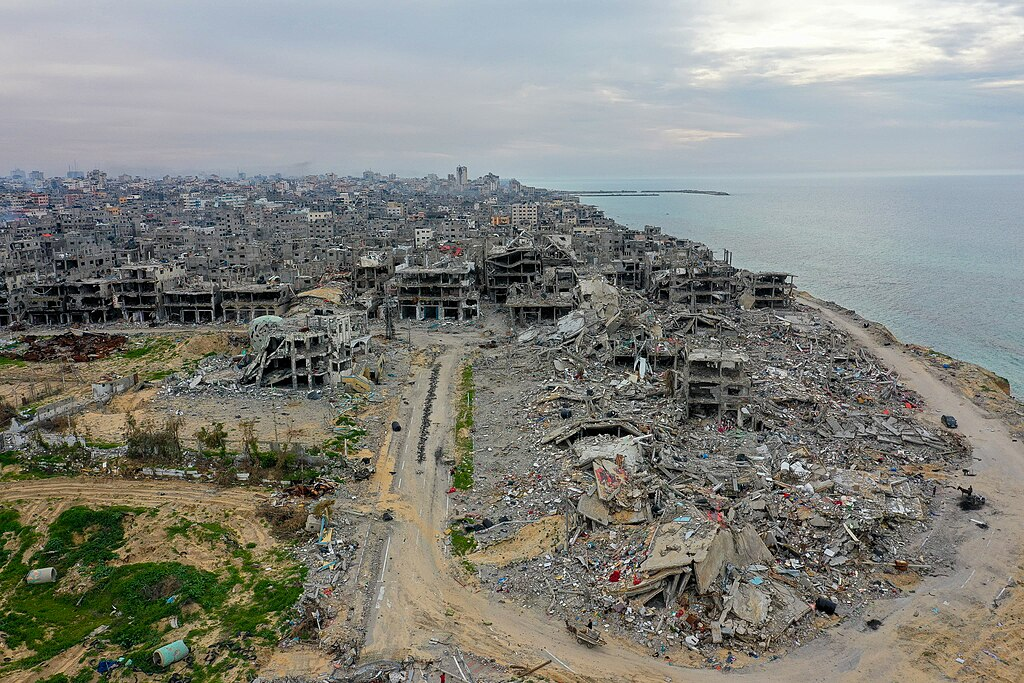
- Aerial view of the Al-Shati refugee camp, significantly destroyed due to Israeli airstrikes, 3 July 2024.
- Interactive map of Al-Shati
- Coordinates: 31°31′55.91″N 34°26′43.42″E
- Country: Palestine
- Governorate: Gaza Governorate
- City: Gaza city

Government
  - Type: Refugee Camp (from 1949)

Area
  - Total: 0.52 km^{2} (0.20 sq mi)

Population (2017)
  - Total: 40,734
  - Density: 78,000/km^{2} (200,000/sq mi)

Al-Shati (Arabic: مخيم الشاطئ), also known as Shati or Beach camp, is a Palestinian refugee camp along the Mediterranean Sea, located in Gaza City within Gaza Governorate in the northern part of Gaza Strip.

Al-Shati was established in 1948 for about 23,000 Palestinians who fled or were expelled from the cities of Jaffa, Lod, and Beersheba as well as surrounding villages during the 1948 Arab–Israeli War. The camp's total land area consists of 520 dunums.

According to the Palestinian Central Bureau of Statistics (PCBS), al-Shati had a population of 40,734 inhabitants in 2017. As of July 2023, the United Nations Relief and Works Agency (UNRWA) reports a population of 90,173 registered refugees. The camp is the third largest refugee camp in the Palestinian Territories.

== History ==
Al-Shati was established in 1948 for about 23,000 Palestinians who fled or were expelled by Zionist militias from the cities of Jaffa, Lod, and Beersheba as well as surrounding villages during the 1948 Arab–Israeli War.

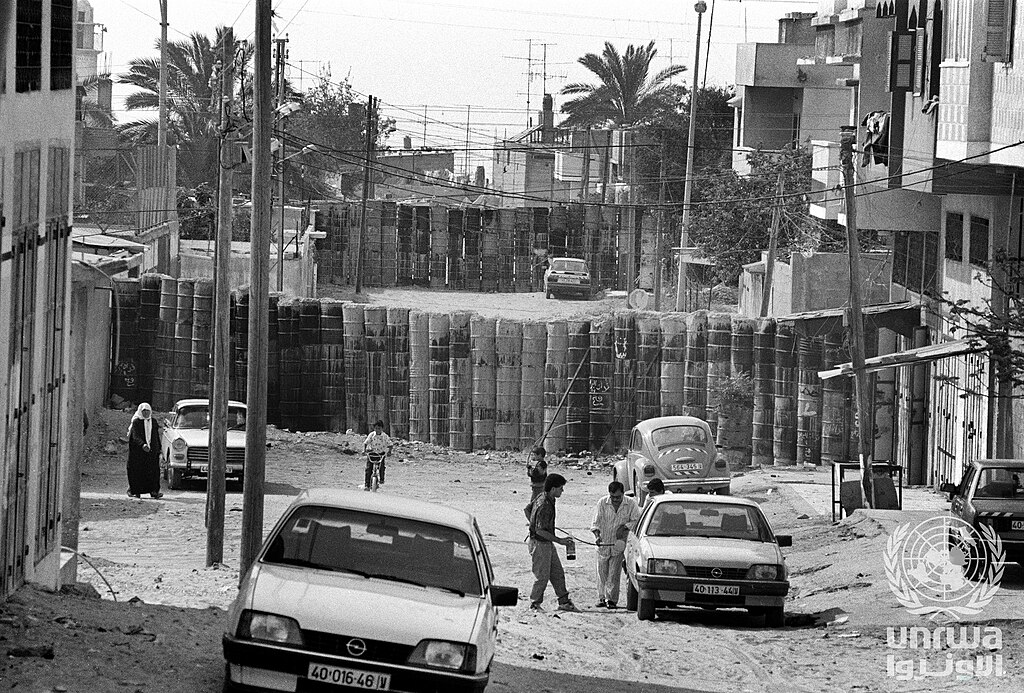
Israeli blockade of the camp during the First Intifada, 1991

In 1971, Israeli authorities demolished over 2,000 shelters for the purpose of widening the roads for security reasons. About 8,000 refugees were forced to leave the camp to the nearby housing project in Sheikh Radwan in Gaza City.

In 2023, Al-Shati was hit by multiple airstrikes during the Gaza war. On November 10, during the Israeli invasion of the Gaza Strip, Israel Defense Forces said they had killed around 150 Hamas militants during battles in the Al-Shati area. In November 2023 the Israel Defense Forces took control of the camp completely.

== Economy ==
Before September 2000, when Israel closed off its border with the Gaza Strip due to the violence of the Second Intifada, the majority of al-Shati's work force were laborers in Israel or worked in agriculture. Today, some refugees work in workshops and sewing factories. A sizable number of the camp's 2453 families depend on fishing for income. It contains a sewage system, a health center, and 23 schools (17 primary, 6 secondary).

== People from Al-Shati ==
- Ismail Haniyeh, de facto Prime Minister of the Palestinian National Authority
- Rashid Masharawi, filmmaker
- Said Seyam, assassinated Interior Minister of the Palestinian National Authority based in Gaza
- Fadel al-Utol, Palestinian archaeologist
- Mosab Abu Toha, poet

== See also ==
- Canada Camp
- Sheikh Radwan
