= Palestinian Civil Defence =

Palestinian security body

- الدفاع المدني الفلسطيني

Operational area
- Country: Palestine

Agency overview
- Established: 1996
- Annual calls: 15,196 interventions (2020)
- Employees: 900
- Fire chief: Major General Al-Abd Ibrahim Khalil

Facilities and equipment
- Stations: 46 (2020)

Website
- www.pcd.ps

The Palestinian Civil Defence (PCD; Arabic: الدفاع المدني الفلسطيني) is one of the main branches of the Palestinian Security Services under direct responsibility of the Ministry of Interior. The organization is responsible for emergency services and rescue in areas under the control of the Palestinian Authority, as well as in the Gaza Strip.

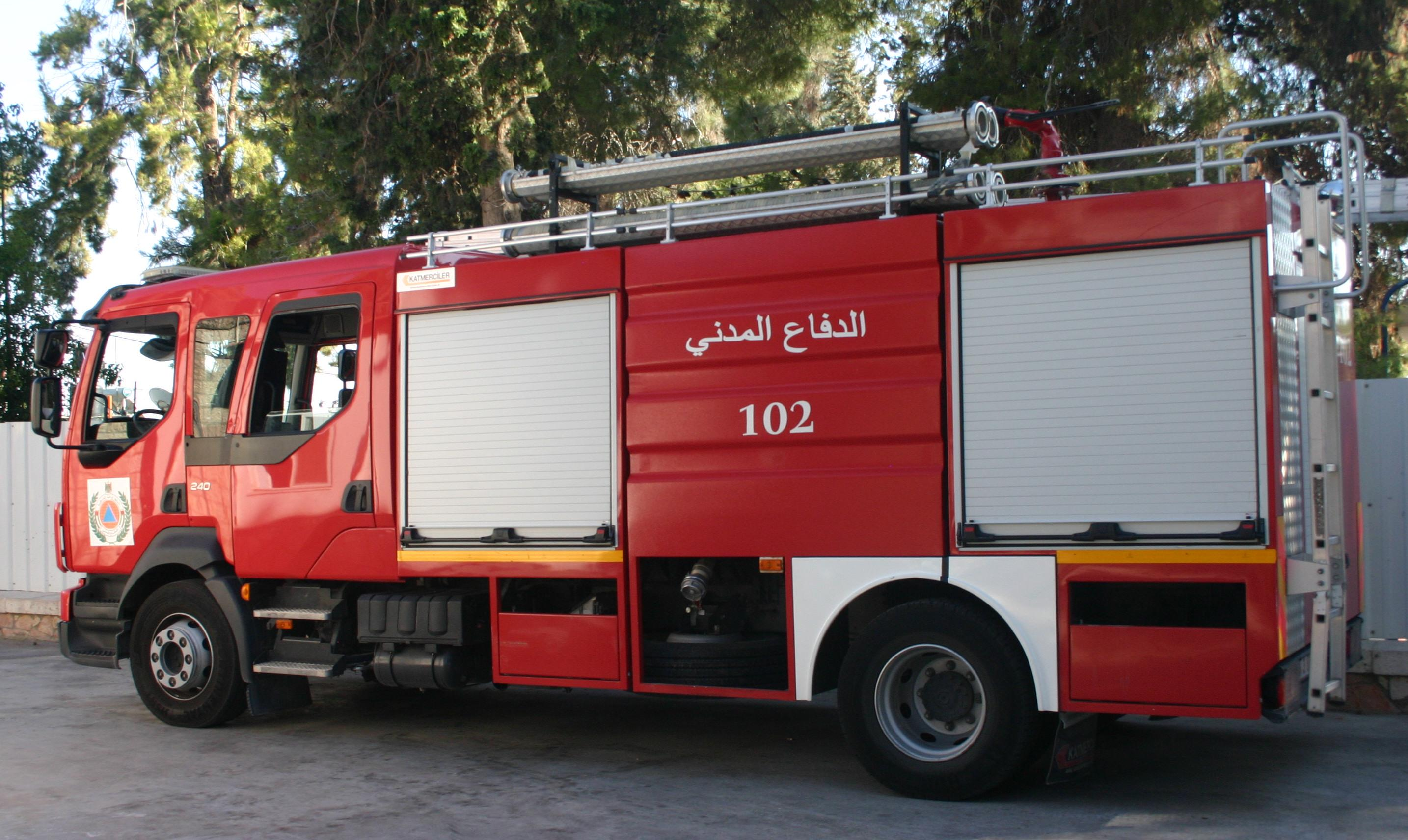
Palestinian Civil Defence Volvo fire engine

== Establishment ==
The Oslo Accords envisioned an Emergency Services and Rescue branch (Al Difa'a Al Madani) as part of one sole security force named "The Palestinian Police".

On 28 May 1998, then President Yasser Arafat issued "Civil Defence Law No. 3 of 1998", which brought into effect a draft law of the Palestinian Legislative Council. The organization came under the authority of the Interior Minister, under the direction of the Director-General of Civil Defence. Also a Higher Civil Defence Council, led by the Interior Minister, was established to formulate and implement the general policy of the Civil Defence.

== Tasks ==
The Civil Defence is an emergency and rescue organization which takes action in cases of natural catastrophes and emergency, including fire, rescue, external military attacks and other risks. The Civil Defence's target response time to emergency calls is 12 minutes.

The organization conducted search and rescue operations during the Gaza war.

== Organization ==
The Civil Defence operates out of 46 fire stations spread across the West Bank and Jerusalem. The fire stations are distributed throughout the governorates as follows:

Jericho Governorate

- Jericho

Tubas Governorate

- Tubas

Salfit Governorate

- Salfit
- Deir Istiya
- Biddiya

Qalqilya Governorate

- Qalqilya
- Hajjah
- Azzun

Nablus Governorate

- North Asira
- Burin
- Balata

Tulkarm Governorate

- Tulkarm
- Atil
- Anabta

Jerusalem Governorate

- Al-Ram
- Abu Dis
- Anata
- Bir Nabala
- Qatanna

Ramallah and Al-Bireh Governorate

- Beitunia
- Al-Bireh
- Birzeit
- Abwein
- Beit Liqia
- Al-Taybeh
- Nil'in

Hebron Governorate

- Yatta
- Dura
- Bani Naim
- as-Samu
- Al-Dhahiriya
- Al-Yasiriya
- Beit Ula
- Halhoul

Jenin Governorate

- Jenin
- Siris
- Barta'a
- Al-Yamoun
- Ya'bad
- Qabatiya
- Arraba
- Marj Ibn Amir
- Jaba'

== International support ==
In June 2015, the European Union provided, as part of a €3.7 million grant, equipment to the Palestinian Civil Defence, including 5 rapid response vehicles and 9 additional vehicles. They were handed over to General Mahmoud Issa, the Director General of the Palestinian Civil Defence. Also provided were mobile lighting masts and electric generators.

In March 2016, the EU delivered 9 firefighting engines and three rescue trucks as part of a €20 million infrastructure programme in the Security Sector. They were handed over at the celebration of the conclusion of a capacity-building programme. Also 8 community police stations and a correctional facility in the West Bank were built as part of the infrastructure programme.

== See also ==
- Palestinian Security Services
- Interior Minister of the Palestinian National Authority
- Palestinian Civil Police Force
- Palestinian National Security Forces
- Palestinian Preventive Security
