= Women in the Gaza war =

Experience of Israeli and Palestinian women

The ongoing Gaza war has been marked by widespread violence against both Israeli and Palestinian women, including reports of rape and sexual violence against Israeli women by Hamas and affiliated militants during the October 7 attacks and in captivity in Gaza, and reports of rape and sexual violence against Palestinian women by the Israel Defense Forces (IDF). At the same time, women have taken on roles as combatants, leadership partners, and participants in informational campaigns.

Following the Hamas-led attacks on Israel on October 7, 2023, there were testimonies and videos indicating that Hamas employed methods of severe torture, including violence and sexual violence against Israeli women and children. Close to 100 Israeli women were taken hostage and held in the Gaza Strip, leading to efforts by Israeli women and organizations to raise awareness and promote their release. The United Nations Secretary General António Guterres and UN Women condemned the gender-based violence against Israeli women during the attacks.

In the Gaza Strip, thousands of women have been killed in the Israeli military's massive aerial bombardment of the Strip. Two-thirds of the then 11,000 Palestinian casualties reported by the Gaza Health Ministry in early November were women and children, indicating disproportionate suffering endured by these groups. In April 2026, a report by UN Women reported that between October 2023 and December 2025, more than 38,000 women and girls were killed. UN agencies reported severe disruptions in maternal, newborn, and child health services due to bombardments and infrastructure damage. Additionally, the United Nations Special Rapporteur on Violence Against Women described the situation as an assault on Palestinian women's dignity and rights. Over 50,000 pregnant women in Gaza face a lack of access to clean water and food, along with limited access to medical supplies and clinics, resulting in increases of infant mortality and the spread of disease.

On 19 February 2024, a group of United Nations special rapporteurs released a report stating "rights experts call for probe into violations against Palestinian women and girls." According to the report, there is evidence that during the Gaza war, Palestinian women and girls were subjected to wartime sexual violence. Palestinian women and girls were reportedly randomly executed in Gaza, often together with their children. Allegations surfaced suggesting that Palestinian women and girls were deliberately targeted and extrajudicially executed by the invading Israel Defense Forces, even when they were holding white pieces of cloth. According to these allegations, Palestinian women and girls were also subjected to inhuman and degrading treatment by the Israel Defense Forces, such as they were denied menstruation pads, food and medicine, and were severely beaten, raped, assaulted, threatened with rape and sexual violence, and subjected to multiple forms of other sexual assaults. Palestinian women and girls were also stripped naked and searched by male Israeli army officers. OHCHR stated that Israeli troops had photographed female detainees in “degrading circumstances” and that the photos had been uploaded online.

== Civilian women ==
=== Gaza Strip ===
As of mid-November 2023, two-thirds of the 11,000 Palestinian casualties reported killed by the Gaza Health Ministry since the onset of the war, were women and children. According to a joint statement by UNICEF, the WHO, UNFPA, and the UNRWA, women in Gaza, along with children and newborns, have borne a disproportionate amount of suffering during the war, saying that "the bombardments, damaged or non-functioning health facilities, massive levels of displacement, collapsing water and electricity supplies as well as restricted access to food and medicines, are severely disrupting maternal, newborn, and child health services". The United Nations Special Rapporteur on Violence Against Women said that "Since 7 October, the assault on Palestinian women’s dignity and rights has taken on new and terrifying dimensions, as thousands have become victims of war crimes, crimes against humanity and an unfolding genocide".

On 25 January 2024, a doctor based in Gaza reported an increase in the number of patients suffering from postpartum depression and postpartum haemorrhages. In March 2024, UN Women called Israel's war on Gaza "a war on women", stating, "While this war spares no one, UN Women data shows that it kills and injures women in unprecedented ways." The Gaza Health Ministry reported that 60,000 pregnant women were suffering from dehydration, malnutrition, and a lack of medical care. The UN stated 95 percent of pregnant and breastfeeding women faced severe food poverty. On 15 March 2024, Amal Hamad, the Palestinian Minister of Women's Affairs, told the UN that 9,000 women had been killed by Israel since 7 October and called "all the women of the world to stand by Palestinian women".

In March 2025, a report by the Independent International Commission of Inquiry on the Occupied Palestinian Territory, including East Jerusalem, and Israel, submitted to the Human Rights Council, detailed the systematic use of sexual and gender-based violence by Israeli Security Forces since October 2023. The report documented multiple instances of Israeli soldiers attempting to humiliate Palestinian women by wearing or posing with their underwear and sharing the images online, while referring to them as "prostitutes" and "sluts." The commission also detailed instances of sexual violence directed against Palestinian girls. Female prisoners were forced to pose in degrading circumstances, including in their underwear and in front of an Israeli flag, with the photos also circulated online. They were subjected to sexual assault, harassment, forced nudity, and threats of rape.

Two and a half months into the war, OCHA estimated a total of 20,000 casualties. More than 40% were children, and over 31% were women. During the first 100 days of the war, more than 24,620 Palestinians were killed in the Gaza Strip, around 70 percent of them women or children. At least 3,000 women could have been widowed and become heads of households, while at least 10,000 children may have been left fatherless. UN Women described women and children as the primary casualties of the Gaza war. Five months into the war, the casualties consisted of an estimated 43% children and 29% women. In November 2024 The UN's Human Rights Office stated that close to 70% of verified victims over a six-month period were women and children. In May 2025, UN Women estimated over 28,000 women and girls were killed in Gaza since October 2023, this being one woman and one girl on average killed every hour in attacks by Israeli forces. In July 2025 the United Nations Special Rapporteur on Violence Against Women presented her findings to the Human Rights Council, wherein she states that Israel is intentionally targeting Palestinian women and girls in a manner aimed at destroying them and undermining the continuity of the Palestinian people, a pattern she described as a "femi-genocide." Her report notes that women and girls make up an estimated 67 percent of the 57,680 Palestinians killed as of 9 July 2025.

In early September 2025, total casualties exceeded 64,231. There were 2,596 children who had lost both parents. Furthermore, 53,724 children had lost one parent; 47,804 their father and 5,920 their mother. In November 2025, the Palestinian Foreign Ministry stated on X that at least 33,000 women and girls were killed by Israel since the October 2023, citing from Gaza's Government Media Office. In April 2026, it was reported by UN Women that between October 2023 and December 2025, more than 38,000 women and girls were killed by Israel.

==== Detentions ====
Advocacy groups have also alleged that Palestinian women in Gaza have been subject to mass arrests by Israeli soldiers. According to the head of the Palestinian Prisoners' Society, Israel has arrested 153 women in Gaza since the outbreak of the war, including pregnant women. Some women were reportedly detained with their babies.

==== Maternal care ====
The United Nations estimates that there are about 50,000 pregnant women in Gaza, with more than 160 women giving birth each day. In the first year of the war, an estimated 50,000 babies were born in the Gaza Strip, according to Save the Children. Of the 1.1 million Gazans who were forced to flee northern Gaza following an Israeli evacuation order, 19,000 were estimated to be pregnant women, with some suffering miscarriages due to stress and shock. Many women in shelters endure inadequate access to food and clean water, and are afraid of giving birth without the assistance of a doctor or midwife. With over two-thirds of the territory's hospitals and primary care clinics no longer functioning, and Gaza's treated water production at 5% of normal levels, pregnant women in Gaza face lack of access to medical care, nutrition, and giving birth with no pain killers. Human Rights Watch, citing the lack of prenatal care and access to functioning medical facilities, warned the conflict would lead to increases in both maternal and infant mortalities. Miscarriages in Khan Younis, in the southern portion of the strip were civilians were ordered to evacuate to, were reported to have increased by 20 percent.

An analysis by the UNRWA found that the lack of food security put lactating and pregnant women at increased risk of lower immune function which would lead to higher rates of nutrition-related illnesses such as anaemia, preeclampsia, and haemorrhage along with other maternal malnutrition illnesses, which in turn would lead to higher rates of maternal and infant mortality. The United Nations Population Fund (UNFPA) stated these conditions affected 45,000 pregnant women and 68,000 breastfeeding women. In May 2024, the UNFPA stated 18,500 pregnant women had been forced to flee Rafah due to Israel's attacks on the city. Doctors in Gaza warned in June 2024 of an "alarming increase in miscarriages," with as many as ten women a day experiencing a miscarriage each day. In June 2024, the UNFPA executive director stated, "Women are delivering babies by caesarean section without anesthesia because there's no energy, there's no generator, the medicines are running out." In July 2024, Noor Alyacoubi wrote about her struggles feeding her infant, including breastfeeding to prevent malnutrition. Alaa al-Nimer discussed being forced to give birth in the middle of the street. UN Women stated 55 percent of women reported health conditions impacting their ability to breastfeed, and 99 percent had difficulties obtaining enough breastmilk.

In July 2024, Doctors Without Borders warned about the impact of Gaza's destroyed health system on pregnant women, stating, "The main health risks for pregnant women are blood-pressure related complications such as eclampsia, hemorrhage, and sepsis—which can become deadly if not treated in time". In August 2024, the United Nations called for additional aid for pregnant women, stating "thousands of breastfeeding and pregnant women in the Gaza Strip are facing hunger and malnutrition of their children". In November 2024, hospital staff at al-Awda Hospital stated that Israeli forces shot two women entering the hospital who were about to give birth and who died bleeding in the street. In July 2025, Doctors Without Borders reported that mothers and newborns in Gaza faced extreme hardship. Damaged hospitals and fuel shortages endangered premature babies, with some dying during power cuts. Many pregnant women were malnourished and lacked prenatal care, leading to complications and early births. Overcrowded neonatal units and limited supplies made even basic care difficult.

==== Hygiene ====
Due to the lack of clean water and access to menstrual hygiene products, many women in Gaza were reported to be taking norethisterone to delay their periods. Human Rights Watch reported that, given the lack clean water supplies to manage their menstrual hygiene, women face increased risks of hepatitis B and thrush.

=== Gaza Strip and West Bank ===
The United Nations experts have expressed deep concern regarding the arbitrary imprisonment of numerous Palestinian women and girls, including human rights activists, journalists, and aid workers, in Gaza and the West Bank. According to the Office of the High Commissioner for Human Rights (OHCHR), many of them have endured cruel treatment, lack of basic necessities like menstrual pads, food, and medication, as well as brutal physical abuse. There have been instances where Palestinian women in Gaza were allegedly confined in a cage in harsh weather conditions without any sustenance.

The experts further highlighted reports of sexual violence against Palestinian women and girls in detention, such as invasive searches conducted by male Israeli soldiers. It has been reported that at least two female detainees were sexually assaulted, while others were threatened with similar acts. Additionally, the experts mentioned that the Israeli army allegedly took degrading photos of female detainees and shared them online.

=== West Bank ===
Women in the occupied West Bank have struggled with insecurity brought about by the ongoing conflict, including invasive searches and heightened travel restrictions. According to the director of the Women Union Committee in Jenin, "The psychological and economic suffering [Palestinian] women face is beyond imagination. When their husbands are in prison, or killed, or prevented from working in Palestine, the Palestinian women suffer." United Nations experts referred to "draconion restrictions on family unification and freedom of movement", as well as the risk of "arbitrary arrest and detention by Israeli occupation forces, which has kept [women] confined to their homes and deprived of their livelihoods," describing this risk as constant. The experts urged Israel to fulfill its duty as an occupying power to "prevent and protect women and girls ... from arbitrary detention, discrimination, and violence".

=== Israel ===
92 Israeli and foreign women and girls were taken hostage and held in Gaza during the October 7 attack. The majority of Israeli women and all Israeli girls held hostage were released during the ceasefire agreement between Israel and Hamas at the end of November 2023. As of May 2024, it is known that 9 female hostages died in captivity, while 12 female hostages are believed to be held hostage alive by Israeli intelligence officials. Many women in Israel have been affected by the slowdown in the economy during the war. Mothers struggle to return to work as child care frameworks have been suspended or operated in a partial emergency format. Many women had to move from their homes due to the evacuation of settlements. Independent women or business owners experienced even more severe economic damage due to the inability to operate their business during the war. It was also found that many women were put on unpaid leave and the economic consequences of the war on the labor market affected women more than men.

== Women in the Israeli military ==
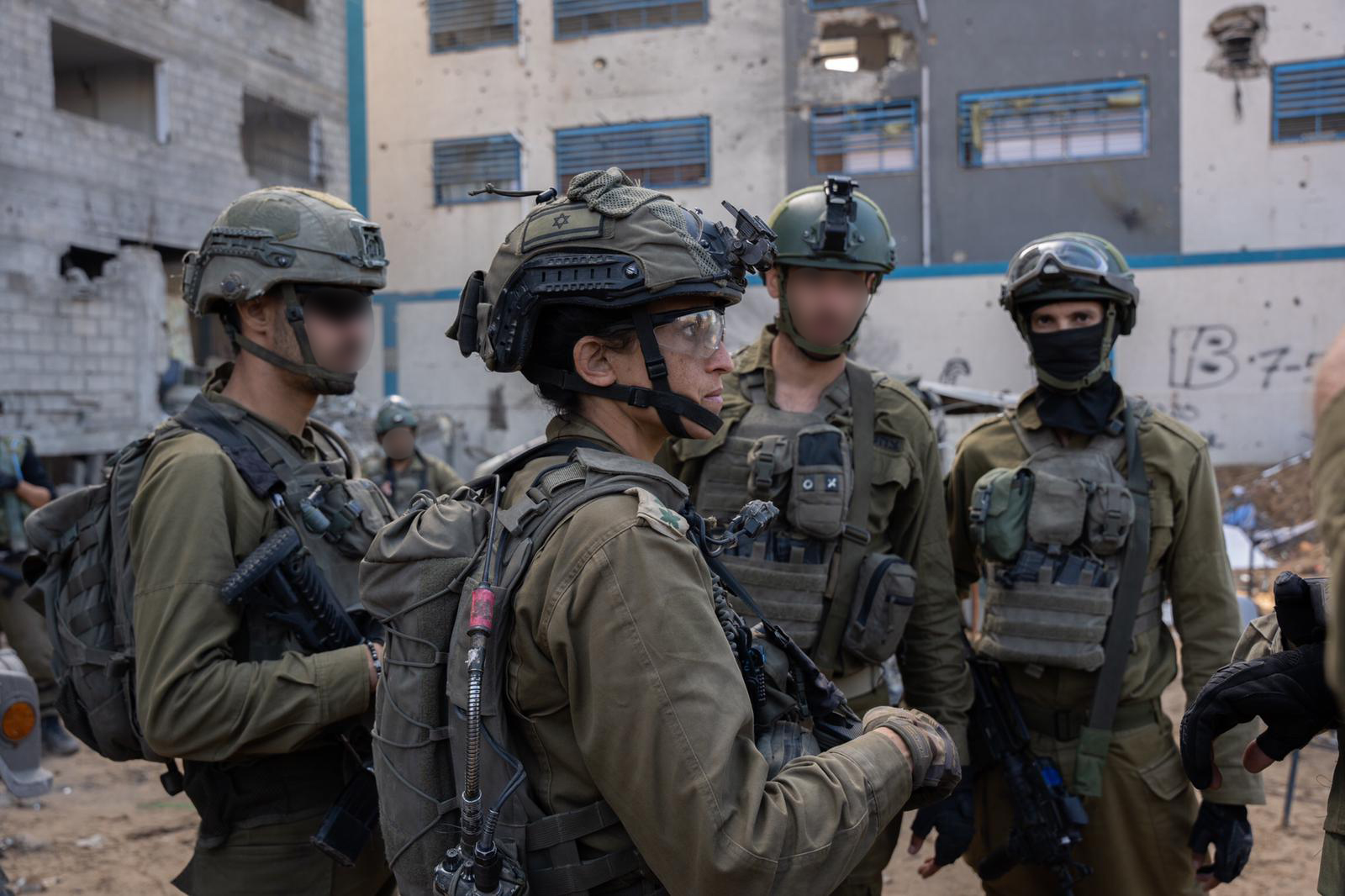
Colonel Yarden Shukrun (center), commander of Shahar Battalion, in the Gaza strip, November 19, 2023

=== Women in the Israel Defense Forces ===
Since the beginning of the 21st century, the Israel Defense Forces (IDF) have significantly expanded the number of combat roles available to women. Female soldiers comprised approximately 21% of combat personnel by 2026. While women serve prominently in air defense (50%), field intelligence, and mixed-gender border battalions, elite ground maneuver units remain restricted amid ongoing religious-equality debates. While women can be assigned to roughly 58% of combat positions, serving in air defense, field intelligence, and border defense battalions, the IDF maintains that the vast majority of elite maneuvering infantry, armored corps, and deep-penetration commando units remain restricted to men.. Women serve across various high-impact fields, including the Israel Air Force, the Israeli Navy, air defense, field intelligence, and mixed-gender border defense battalions. Israel is one of a handful of countries where there is a mandatory conscription law for women.

==== Hostages ====
7 Israeli female soldiers were taken hostage from the attack on the Nahal Oz military base, with one soldier rescued on October 30, 2023, one soldier dying in captivity, and five soldiers still held as hostages as of May 2024. Noa Argamani, a female hostage taken from the Nova music festival was rescued by the IDF on June 8, 2024, in Nuseirat.

There were attempts, led by Israeli women, to raise awareness for the hostage crisis, and to promote the hostages release.

==== Field observers ====
In the October 7 attacks, 14 field observers from Battalion 414 at Nahal Oz base were killed, an unprecedented number of female field soldiers killed in battle. Seven field observers were taken hostage. Additional field observers were locked in the war room and continued to work. From testimony after the event, it appears that in the months preceding the surprise attack, the field observers warned of Hamas' preparations for an attack, intelligence gathering and unusual training. According to the field observers, throughout this period, the senior command refused to listen to the warnings. "This is an apparatus made up entirely of young women and commanders," says one of them. "There is no doubt that if men were sitting at these screens, things would look different."

==== Caracal Battalion ====
Women in the Caracal Battalion tank unit joined the fighting against dozens of Hamas militants on Highway 232 in the Gaza envelope. Later the crew identified four militants in Moshav Yated and subdued them. The crew continued driving the tank towards Holit, broke through the gate of the kibbutz and advanced to the focal point of the incident together with other fighters, They engaged for about 40 minutes against a squad of 20 militants until the militants were repelled and killed.

Lt. Col. Or Ben Yehuda, commander of the Caracal Battalion, fought at the head of a force that killed 15 armed Hamas militants in Yated after long hours of fighting. In the Battle of Sufa her battalion killed over a hundred Hamas militants under her command, and together with Shayetet 13 cleared the outpost of infiltrators saving the lives of dozens of soldiers.

==== Israeli Air Force ====
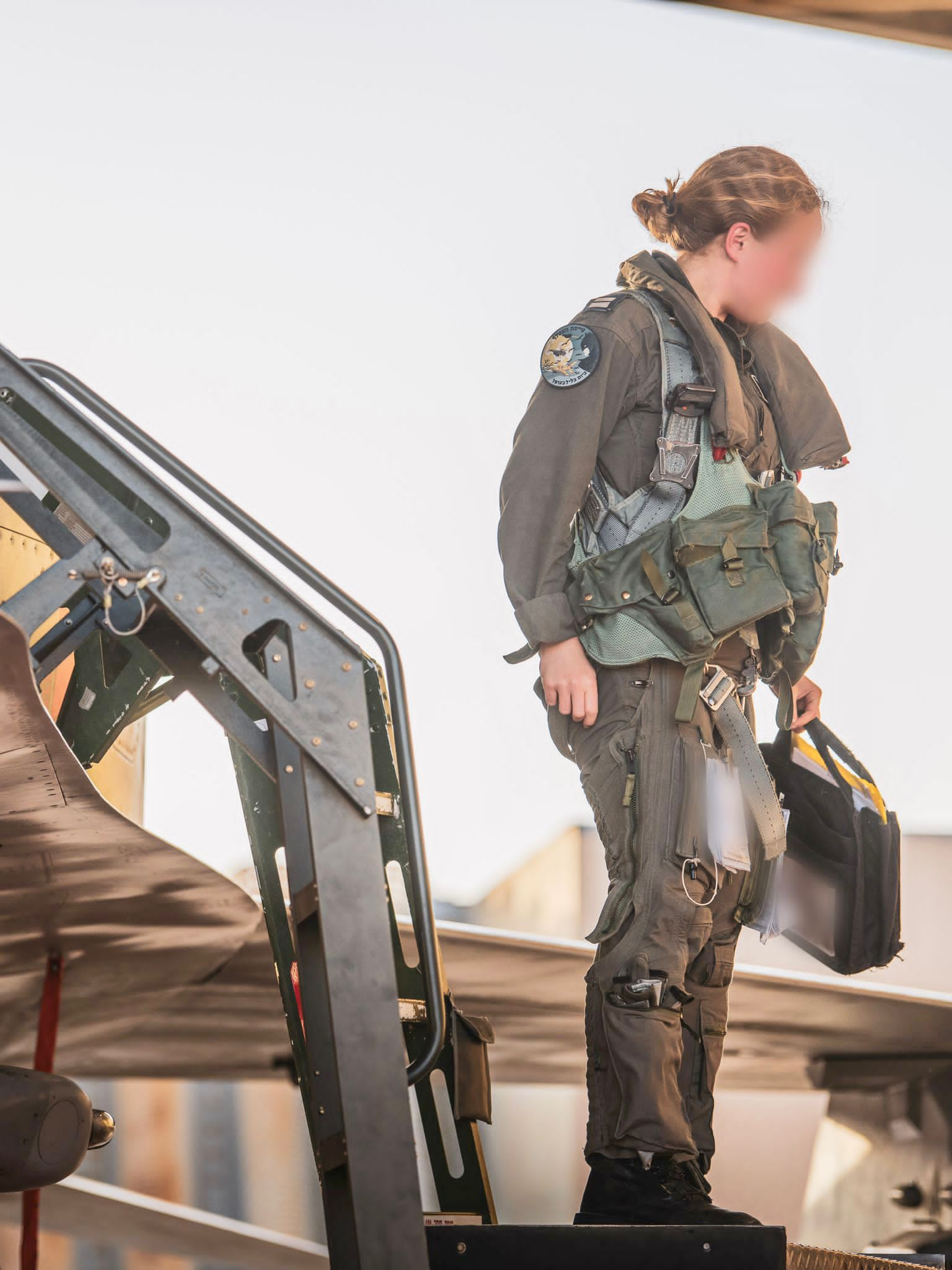
Female fighter pilot from the 119 Squadron

Women in the Israeli Air Force performed a variety of roles from the first day of the war. This includes pilots, combat navigators, and unmanned aerial vehicle operators. For the first time, 2 women were set to enter the elite 669 search and rescue unit.

==== Other IDF units ====
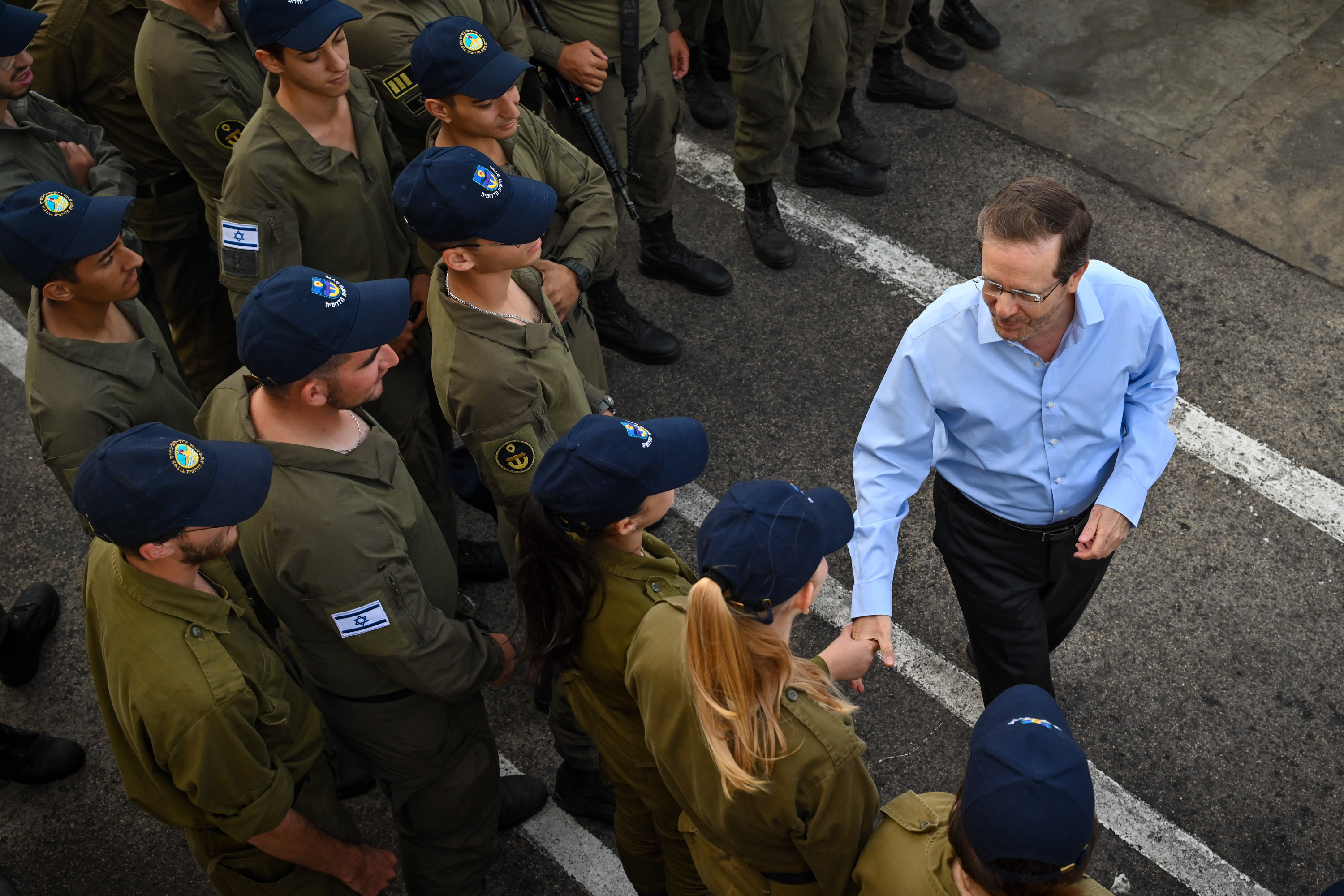
President of the State of Israel Isaac Herzog in a meeting with women fighters from the Navy. November 2023

- Colonel Yarden Shukron-Yifrach, commander of Shahar Battalion in the Rescue and Training Brigade of the Home Front Command, led a force that fought militants on Zikim Beach and in Ofakim. In November, this battalion was also the first to introduce female IDF combat soldiers to join ground forces in Gaza.
- Commanders and fighters from the Lions of the Jordan Battalion participated in combat in the surrounding area.
- Female soldiers participated in combat in the Navy in various roles, such as maritime control operators, as well as saboteurs and fighters on warships.
- Officers from the Home Front Command in a liaison unit to the local authority, in dozens of cities and authorities across the country, managing civilian readiness for missile attacks and returning to routine afterwards.
- Lieutenant Ilan Elharar, commander of Battalion 13 of the Golani Brigade's Nahal Oz command post, rescued 7 soldiers from an attack by hundreds of militants on the command post.

=== Women in the Israel Police Force ===
Female officers played a significant role in Israel Police activities with the outbreak of the war. Six policewomen were killed in the line of duty. Staff Sergeant Major Mor Shakuri was killed in a fight with militants on the roof of the Sderot Police Station. Senior policewomen were killed in battle with militants in Yakhini and Kibbutz Re'im.

== Sexual and gender-based violence against Israelis and Palestinians ==
A group of United Nations experts expressed alarm regarding the increasing volume of allegations of sexual violence reportedly perpetrated by armed groups against Israeli and Palestinian women and girls since October 7, 2023. The experts called for an independent process of investigation and accountability.

Reem Alsalem, the UN Special Rapporteur on violence against women and girls, said that although both genders are affected by these atrocities, women are particularly vulnerable to the consequences.

=== Sexual and gender-based violence against Israelis ===
During the October 7 attacks, Israeli women, girls and men were reportedly subjected to sexual violence, including rape and sexual assault, by Hamas or other Gazan militants. The militants involved in the attack are accused of having committed acts of gender-based violence, war crimes and crimes against humanity. Hamas has denied that its fighters engaged in sexual violence and has called for an impartial international investigation into the accusations.

The extent of sexual violence perpetrated by militants, and whether it was planned and weaponised by the attackers, has been the subject of intense debate and controversy. Initially said to be "dozens" by Israeli authorities, they later clarified they could not provide a number. In January 2024, it was reported that several victims of sexual violence from 7 October and captivity in Gaza had come forward. A number of initial testimonies of sexual violence were later discredited, while Israel has accused international human rights groups of downplaying assault reports. As of January 2025, the former head of the security cases division in Israel's Southern District prosecutor's office said that no case was being filed due to a lack of evidence and complainants, which she said could be due to victims being dead or unwilling to come forward.

The UN's Special Representative on Sexual Violence in Conflict, Pramila Patten, reported in March 2024, with the "full cooperation" of the Israeli government, that there was "clear and convincing information" that Israeli hostages in Gaza had experienced sexual violence, and that there was "reasonable grounds to believe that conflict-related sexual violence occurred during the 7 October attacks". The report was not a full investigation, but designed to "collect and verify allegations", and the team stated that their conclusions fell below the legal threshold of being "beyond a reasonable doubt". In June 2024, the UN Commission of Inquiry (CoI) published a legally mandated report that stated there was "a pattern indicative of sexual violence by Palestinian forces during the attack", but that it was unable to independently verify allegations of rape due to Israel's obstruction of its investigation. It also found some of the allegations to be false and found "no credible evidence" that Palestinian militants had received direct orders to commit sexual violence.

On 12 April 2024, the European Union sanctioned military and special forces wings of Hamas and the armed wing of Palestinian Islamic Jihad due to their responsibility for the alleged sexual violence on 7 October. The EU said the two groups' fighters "committed widespread sexual and gender-based violence in a systematic manner, using it as a weapon of war." On 23 April 2024, the annual UN Secretary-General's report called on the Israeli government to allow access to "relevant UN bodies to carry out a fully-fledged investigation into all alleged violations". In July 2025, Hamas was added to the UN's sexual violence blacklist.

After pressure from the Israeli government and others, the UN's Special Representative on Sexual Violence in Conflict Pramila Patten declared a fact-finding mission to Israel, an unprecedented move for her office. She and her team spent two weeks in Israel and the West-Bank at the invitation of the Israeli government. Azadeh Moaveni reported: "Her office didn't have a mandate to investigate sexual crimes on the ground and had never undertaken such a mission before. I was told by multiple sources at the UN that her trip was a matter of fierce controversy within the organisation."

On 4 March 2024, Patten's United Nations team published a report concluding that "there are reasonable grounds to believe that conflict-related sexual violence occurred during the 7 October attacks in multiple locations across Gaza periphery, including rape and gang-rape, in at least three locations", namely the Nova music festival, nearby Road 232, and kibbutz Re'im. The mission did not manage to independently verify media reports of sexual violence in Nahal Oz kibbutz and Kfar Aza kibbutz.

The UN team was also "unable to establish the prevalence of sexual violence", and "did not gather information and/or draw conclusions on attribution of alleged violations to specific armed groups", due to the lack of a "fully-fledged" investigation. The report concludes that "specific attribution of the violations would require a fully-fledged investigation". Patten later requested permission to investigate Hamas' alleged crimes, on condition that her team should also be allowed to access Israeli detention facilities to examine claims of sexual violence by Israeli soldiers, but the request was denied.

The UN "mission was not investigative", but was designed to collect and confirm allegations, with information being in "large part sourced from Israeli national institutions", stated the report. Separately, Patten told the media that the Israeli government fully cooperated with them, with the mission finding the information given to be "authentic and unmanipulated". The report noted that the mission collected "Credible circumstantial information, which may be indicative of some forms of sexual violence, including genital mutilation, sexualized torture, or cruel, inhuman and degrading treatment".

The report also found "clear and convincing information" to show that Israeli hostages in Gaza had been subject to "sexual violence, including rape, sexualized torture, and cruel, inhumane and degrading treatment". According to the UN report, its "witnesses and sources ... adopted over time an increasingly cautious and circumspect approach regarding past accounts, including in some cases retracting statements made previously", with some disavowing confidence in allegations they had previously made to media outlets.

An investigation by The Times which includes an interview with Patten reiterates that her report was not a full and legal investigation, did not establish anything beyond a reasonable doubt, and cites Patten again calling on the Israeli government to cooperate with the UN agency tasked with an investigative mandate, the Commission of Inquiry.

On 23 April 2024, a UN report on sexual violence in 2023, authored by Secretary-General Antonio Guterres, included the October 7 violence along with 17 other global cases, drawing on Patten's report. But it did not include Hamas in the list of state and non-state parties guilty of sexual violence in 2023 due to Patten’s not being a full and legally mandated investigation, and called for one to be conducted.

The Independent International Commission of Inquiry on the Occupied Palestinian Territory released an in-depth investigative report on 12 June 2024 which found that both Hamas and Israel had committed sexual violence and torture, along with intentional attacks on civilians. The report was created by information compiled from interviews of victims, witnesses, open sourced items, forensic medical reports, and satellite imagery. Israel had previously announced its refusal to cooperate with the inquiry and rejected the allegations.

The commission found that Palestinian forces were responsible for incidents "indicative of sexual violence" at the Re'im festival and the Nahal Oz military outpost, as well as several kibbutzim. These incidents included the physical and sexual abuse of female abductees and "sexualized desecration" of corpses both male and female. It found Hamas targeted women, whose bodies were "used as victory trophies by male perpetrators [and] put on public display, either on the streets of the Gaza Strip or online."

The report concluded that the acts of sexual violence on 7 October were "not isolated incidents but perpetrated in similar ways in several locations and by multiple Palestinian perpetrators." The report concluded there was a pattern indicative of sexual violence by Palestinian forces during the attack, and that Hamas and other militant groups were responsible for gender-based violence "by willful killings, abductions, and physical, mental and sexual abuse".

The commission was unable to independently verify testimony of genital mutilation, sexual torture and rape, citing a lack of access to witnesses and crime scenes, and Israel's obstruction of its investigations. It also found no evidence that Palestinian forces had been ordered to commit sexual violence. In addition, the Commission found some specific allegations to be false or contradictory.

In July 2025, the Jerusalem-based human rights organization The Dinah Project published a report which they allege shows that Hamas used sexual violence as a tactical weapon and genocidal scheme. The group was created after the 7 October attacks by legal scholar Ruth Halperin-Kaddar, lawyer and former prosecutor Sharon Zagagi-Pinhas and former judge and attorney general Nava Ben-Or. The publication compiles reports of "forced nudity, gang rapes, genital mutilation, and threats of forced marriage" during the 7 October attacks and in captivity based on eyewitness accounts, including from 15 returned hostages, one survivor testimony of attempted rape at a music festival, and interviews with first responders, morgue personnel and healthcare professionals.

United Nations Special Rapporteur on violence against women and girls, Reem Alsalem, responded to the publication of the report with a statement saying that while the U.N. special commission appointed to investigate "found patterns indicative of sexual violence against Israeli women at different locations, [t]he Commission was also unable to independently verify specific allegations of sexual and gender-based violence due to Israel’s obstruction of its investigations." In response to the central claim of the report, Alsalem stated: "It is my understanding that neither the Commission nor any other independent human rights mechanism established that sexual or gender-based violence was committed against Israelis on or since the 7th of October as a systematic tool of war or as a tool of genocide."

According to Drop Site News, The Dinah Project report "contains scant new evidence and largely aggregates existing reports, many of which have been discredited or called into question."

=== Sexual and gender-based violence against Palestinians ===
During the ongoing Gaza war, Israeli male and female soldiers, guards and medical staff have reportedly committed wartime sexual violence against Palestinian women, children and men including rape, gang-rape and sexualized torture and genital mutilation. In February 2024, UN experts reported at least two cases of Palestinian women being raped by male Israeli soldiers. Palestinian boys and men have also been reportedly raped and subjected to torture, and in some cases, the impact of rape and torture has led to death of the victim.

On 19 February 2024, a group of United Nations special rapporteurs released a report stating "rights experts call for probe into violations against Palestinian women and girls." According to the report, there is evidence that during the Gaza war, Palestinian women and girls were subjected to wartime sexual violence. According to these reports, Palestinian women and girls were also subjected to inhuman and degrading treatment by the IDF, such as they were denied menstruation pads, food and medicine, and were severely beaten, raped, assaulted, threatened with rape and sexual violence, and subjected to multiple forms of sexual assaults. Palestinian women and girls were also stripped naked and searched by male Israeli army officers. OHCHR denounced that Israeli troops had photographed female detainees in “degrading circumstances” and that the photos had been uploaded online.

The UN report states, "Palestinian women and girls in detention have also been subjected to multiple forms of sexual assault, such as being stripped naked and searched by male Israeli army officers. At least two female Palestinian detainees were reportedly raped". One of the special rapporteurs; Reem Alsalem, cautioned that the reservation in reporting sexual violence was common due to reprisal concerns. Alsalem stated that since the 7 October attacks, women and girls in Israeli detention had faced an increasingly permissive attitude by Israeli officials towards sexual assault. According to Middle East Eye, the phrase "at least" highlighted the fact that many occurrences remain unrecorded, as victims dread the stigma and repercussions associated with speaking out about sexual abuse in "a patriarchal society reluctant to address such atrocities".

The special rapporteurs have also raised concerns over a number of Palestinian women and children going missing, with reports of children being separated from their parents. In one instance a female infant was reportedly forcibly moved to Israel by the IDF. In response to the report, a spokesman for the U.S. Department of State said, "Civilians and detainees must be treated humanely, and in accordance with international humanitarian law." Physicians for Human Rights–Israel also described the sexual humiliation of detainees, including sexual insults and urination on prisoners.

The Associated Press in March 2024 reported on Palestinian women giving testimony about having been abused during their detention by Israel, one woman said that Israeli soldiers conducted strip searches, and during the detention, if "we raised our heads or uttered any words, they beat us on the head [...] Loud music, shouting and intimidation — they wanted to humiliate us. We were handcuffed, blindfolded, and our feet were tied in chains"; another woman alleged that an Israeli soldier smashed her face into a wall when she would not kiss the flag of Israel.

A detailed and legally mandated June 2024 investigative report by the Independent International Commission of Inquiry on the Occupied Palestinian Territory stated both Israel and Hamas had committed sexual violence and torture, along with intentional attacks on civilians. Regarding Israeli actions against Palestinians, the report concludes that sexual and gender-based violence (SGBV) is deployed by Israeli forces and civilians against Palestinian women and men, throughout the occupied Palestinian territories. The report concludes that: "The frequency, prevalence and severity of sexual and gender-based crimes perpetrated against Palestinians since 7 October across the Occupied Palestinian Territories (OPT) indicate that specific forms of Sexual and gender-based violence (SGBV) are part of Israeli Security Forces (ISF) operating procedures."

The Commission's report was completed through the use of interviewing victims and witnesses along with a variety of other means, and Israel had previously announced its refusal to cooperate. The report indicates that sexual violence was used by the IDF to push the idea of "the subordination of an occupied people" in both Gaza and the Israeli-occupied West Bank.

In December 2024, dozens of Palestinian women and girls reported that sexual abuse were committed against them by Israeli forces during the storming of the Kamal Adwan hospital. They described being forced to undress, strip-searched and sexually harassed. Those who attempted to resist were "brutally beaten". One witness stated "They told us they would film us to show [the world] that Hamas was using us as human shields. When we arrived, they dragged us by our hair across the schoolyard, forced us into toilets, and ordered us to undress".

In March 2025, a report by the Independent International Commission of Inquiry on the Occupied Palestinian Territory, including East Jerusalem, and Israel, submitted to the Human Rights Council, detailed the systematic use of sexual and gender-based violence by Israeli Security Forces since October 2023. The report documented multiple instances of Israeli soldiers attempting to humiliate Palestinian women by wearing or posing with their underwear and sharing the images online, while referring to them as "prostitutes" and "sluts." The Commission also detailed instances of sexual violence directed against Palestinian girls. Female prisoners were forced to pose in degrading circumstances, including in their underwear and in front of an Israeli flag, with the photos also circulated online. They were subjected to sexual assault, harassment, forced nudity, and threats of rape.

Palestinian women in Gaza have alleged threats of rape and sexual violence by invading Israeli soldiers. Speaking to Euro-Mediterranean Human Rights Monitor, one Palestinian woman, who was pregnant, described being forced to undress by an Israeli soldier, who threatened to rape her.

Multiple Palestinian prisoners reported threats of rape following the outbreak of the war. One such woman, the journalist Lama Khater, reported threats of rape against female prisoners including herself: "They threatened to rape me... It was clear the goal was to intimidate me." Israel denied the allegations and threatened to prosecute her lawyer for incitement. Another released Palestinian female prisoner made similar allegations.

In June 2025, several photos circulated in social media of allegedly showing coffee bags that were sent to IDF soldiers containing a message in Hebrew telling them to rape Palestinians 'with a rusty iron bar until there is blood coming.' The photos garnered support from Israelis online.

==== Risk of gender-based violence ====
Areas of armed conflict have increased risks to women and girls for gender-based violence, including sexual assault; UN reporting on cases of gender-based violence has been disrupted due to the displacement of UN workers. Overcrowded facilities being used as shelters, with limited bathrooms, increase those risks. The UNRWA has said that, as of 15 November 2023, that they had not seen an increase in such violence, but a spokesperson cautioned "Both sexual harassment and domestic violence tend to increase in prolonged periods of displacement." Women and men sheltering at UN facilities in the south of Gaza sleep in different sections to try to alleviate some of these risks. The lack of access to medical care also extends to the clinical treatment of rape.

During the war, there were some reports of women being sexually exploited by some aid workers or local men in exchange for aid, food, money or the promise of jobs. Aid organizations and experts said exploitation commonly occurs during times of conflict, and other reports of abuse and exploitation have come to light during such crises such as in South Sudan and Congo.

== See also ==
- Effect of the Gaza war on children in the Gaza Strip
- Jamila al-Shanti
