= Sexual and gender-based violence in the October 7 attacks =

Sexual and gender-based violence committed by Hamas

During the October 7 attacks, Israeli women, girls and men were subjected to sexual violence, including rape and sexual assault, by Hamas or other Gazan militants. The militants involved in the attack are accused of having committed acts of gender-based violence, war crimes and crimes against humanity. Hamas has denied that its fighters engaged in sexual violence. In December 2023, Israeli police said they were investigating "dozens" of cases. In January 2024, several victims of sexual violence from 7 October and captivity in Gaza had come forward. By January 2024, various sources had confirmed between six and 30 cases.

The extent of sexual violence perpetrated by militants, and whether it was planned and weaponised by the attackers, has been the subject of intense debate and controversy. A number of initial testimonies of sexual violence were later discredited, while Israel has accused international human rights groups of downplaying assault reports. As of January 2025, the former head of the security cases division in Israel's Southern District prosecutor's office said that no case was being filed due to a lack of evidence and complainants, which she said could be due to victims being dead or unwilling to come forward.

The UN's Special Representative on Sexual Violence in Conflict, Pramila Patten, reported in March 2024, with the "full cooperation" of the Israeli government, that there was "clear and convincing information" that Israeli hostages in Gaza had experienced sexual violence, and that there was "reasonable grounds to believe that conflict-related sexual violence occurred during the 7 October attacks". In June 2024, the UN Commission of Inquiry (CoI) published a legally mandated report that stated there was "a pattern indicative of sexual violence by Palestinian forces during the attack", but that it was unable to independently verify allegations of rape due to Israel's obstruction of its investigation. It also found some of the allegations to be false and found "no credible evidence" that Palestinian militants had received direct orders to commit sexual violence.

On 12 April 2024, the European Union sanctioned military and special forces wings of Hamas and the armed wing of Palestinian Islamic Jihad due to their responsibility for the sexual violence on 7 October. The EU said the two groups' fighters "committed widespread sexual and gender-based violence in a systematic manner, using it as a weapon of war." On 23 April 2024, the annual UN Secretary-General's report called on the Israeli government to allow access to "relevant UN bodies to carry out a fully-fledged investigation into all alleged violations". In July 2025, Hamas was added to the UN's sexual violence blacklist.

== Evidence ==
Gender percentage of 7 October deaths
Group	Source	% female	Reference
Total	AOAV	26.6%	(Note: "Of the total of 1,004 victims whose gender is identified, 735 (73.4%) of these were male, and 278 (26.6%) female.")
Civilians	Walla/TOI	36%	(Note: "But the Walla news site has published data by age and gender for 756 of the murdered civilians for which information is available...two girls...11 female...162 women...59 women...69 women...seven women." That totals 272 female killed out of 756 total civilians dead.)
Civilians	AOAV	41%	(Note: "Civilians has 217 male and 153 female killed.)
Military	AOAV	11%	(Note: "Military has 298 male and 38 female killed.)
Other security forces	AOAV	15%	(Note: "Police and rescue" has 22 male and 4 female killed.)

The attacks by Hamas on Israeli communities, in which 1,139 people were killed and 240 hostages were kidnapped to the Gaza Strip, involved widespread sexual violence. Hamas fighters infiltrated Israeli towns, where witnesses said they tortured, raped and sexually assaulted many women and girls of all ages, and some men.

Following the attacks, Israeli police, Shin Bet and Israeli military began to collect evidence, take witness statements and to interrogate captured Hamas militants concerning the sexual violence perpetrated during the 7 October attack. Police recorded the difficulty in collecting physical evidence in a war zone. Due to this the full extent of the crimes may never be known. Authorities retrieved video evidence, photographs of victims' bodies, and militants' testimonies which they said confirmed accounts of sexual assault.

Due to the chaotic nature of the body recovery process, physical forensic evidence was largely impossible to collect, leading investigators to rely primarily on witness testimony rather than autopsies. To pressure the Israeli Prime Minister Benjamin Netanyahu for securing the release of hostages, the Hostages Families Forum also released graphic footage of kidnapped Israel Defense Forces (IDF) women personnel that were previously released by Hamas and edited by the IDF that excluded "the most disturbing scenes".

In November 2023, Ina Kubbe, a gender and conflict scholar at Tel Aviv University, stated that reported signs were consistent with sexual violence, but that rape could not be formally determined without a forensic investigation. In December 2023, in a review of evidence mainly provided by the Israel Defense Forces and Israeli officials, NBC News stated that the evidence "suggests that dozens of Israeli women were raped or sexually abused or mutilated".

=== Testimony of Israelis ===
Survivors, victims, witnesses, first responders, and military personnel provided accounts of the rape, mutilation and other sexual violence that Hamas militants inflicted. An official from Lahav 433 told the Knesset that 1,500 testimonies had been collected. Shelly Harush, the police officer leading the investigation recounted to The Times on 2 December 2023: "It's clear now that sexual crimes were part of the planning and the purpose was to terrify and humiliate people."

=== Limited forensic work ===
Members of the UN, Physicians for Human Rights–Israel, and the Association of Rape Crisis Centers in Israel have all noted the lack of forensic investigation that was done on the deceased at the attack locations. Due to the large numbers of deceased individuals Israel was attempting to fully identify all of the victims at least a month after the 7 October attacks, causing overtaxed morgues to not collect physical evidence or process rape kits from any bodies. Morgue officials in Israel reportedly cannot designate individual cases of rape or sexual violence, due to a lack of physical proof that is necessary in a court of law.

The UN, which found "clear and convincing information" of sexual violence during the Hamas attacks, reports that the limited forensic evidence is due to both the large number of casualties and the "dispersed crime scenes in a context of persistent hostilities". A government relations officer at the Israel Women's Network said that, most of the raped had been killed, and their bodies were burned or buried along with any forensic evidence. Israeli media acknowledged the scenes of the attacks had not been properly photographed, preserved or forensically examined.

=== Interrogations of Hamas militants ===
On 24 October Israeli security agencies released video footage, showing their interrogation of seven alleged Hamas militants. On 25 October, the Associated Press analyzed six of these interrogation videos, and stated that they could not independently verify them, and that the alleged militants, who are bloodied and wincing in pain, could have been speaking under duress.

On 28 March 2024 the IDF released footage of an alleged PIJ militant, Manar Mahmoud Muhammad Qassem, saying he raped an Israeli woman in a kibbutz on 7 October. In the video, Qassem describes the incident including her clothes, bra and underwear and the fact she was later taken with her mother by two other militants.

The following day, Middle East Eye reported that the released IDF video "was deleted and reposted several times after commentators noted inconsistencies in the testimony and subtitle mistranslations." It added that "The alleged confession was first reported in December. Since then, despite Qasem providing a detailed description of the victim's physical appearance, the Israeli forces have failed to identify the woman."

In May 2024, the IDF released footage of a captured father and son, who were said to be Hamas members, confessing to murdering civilians in their homes, kidnapping victims, and raping women before murdering one of them at kibbutz Nir Oz.

Human Rights Watch and Amnesty International stated that these alleged confessions were likely extracted under torture, violate international law and basic human rights, and should be considered inadmissible as credible evidence. They also called on the Israeli government to cease publishing such taped "confessions". Physicians for Human Rights Israel denounced these alleged taped confessions, citing "severe concern that the interrogations included the use of torture." The UN and reports by human rights organizations such as B'Tselem and media outlets have confirmed Israeli systematic use of torture during the Gaza war, including rape, gang-rape, sexualized torture and mutilation of detained Palestinian men, women and children by Israeli guards, including during interrogations.

=== Prosecution ===
In December 2024 Ynet published an interview with Israeli prosecutor Moran Gaz, who had previously been in charge of Israel's Southern Prosecutor's Office and a member of Team 7.10 dealing with Hamas crimes on 7 October. Gaz says obtaining justice, particularly for sexual offenses, will be very difficult, and asked the public to lower expectations for it:

In the end, we have no complainants. What was presented in the media compared to what will ultimately emerge will be completely different. Either because the victims were murdered, or because the women who were raped by them are not prepared to reveal it. We contacted women's rights organizations and asked for cooperation. They told us that they simply did not contact them. There were parents who contacted the organizations and asked what to do if something happened to their daughter, but they did not disclose the abuse...I know there is public expectation and understand the need to address the horrific sexual crimes and sexual assaults that have been committed, but the vast majority of them will not be able to meet the threshold of proof in court, and the criticism will ultimately come to the prosecutor's office – unjustly.

Gaz also said she wants everyone who crossed the fence "to kill or to loot, it doesn't matter" to face the death penalty.

=== Assessments of motivation ===
Experts, such as one that Vox interviewed, say that sexual violence is an "inherent, if under-examined, aspect of violent conflict". Hamas admitted "mistakes were made" on 7 October, but denied that its fighters committed rape and sexual assault, noting that it is forbidden in Islam.

Israelis and others have accused Hamas of systematically using rape as a weapon of war.

In February 2024, the Association of Rape Crisis Centers of Israel (ARCCI), published Silent Cry: Sexual Crimes in the October 7 War, a document summarizing witness testimony and categorizing the reported incidents of sexual violence of 7 October into "Practices of Rape During Wars" and "Sadistic Practices". Throughout the report, ARCCI repeats conclusions that the sexual violence was systematic, deliberate, widespread, and not spontaneous or incidental, and "Hamas terrorists employed sadistic practices aimed at intensifying the degree of humiliation and terror inherent in sexual violence".

== Acts by location ==
Sexual violence took place in four types of locations:

- at the Nova (Re'im) outdoor music festival and the surrounding area to which attendees fled
- in Be'eri and other kibbutzim, to civilians who were killed
- at Camp Shura and other IDF bases near the border, to soldiers
- in captivity in the Gaza Strip, to Israeli hostages

=== Re'im music festival and vicinity ===
Hamas led an attack on the Supernova Sukkot Gathering, an open-air music festival during the Jewish holiday of Shemini Atzeret near kibbutz Re'im a little after 7 am on 7 October.

==== Video of "the woman in black dress" ====
On 8 October, a video from the festival circulated on social media which showed a woman lying on her back, dress torn, legs spread and vagina exposed while her face was burned and her right hand covering her eyes. She was later identified as Gal Abdush (née Brakha). Eden Wessely, a woman searching for a friend after the rave who says she filmed the video, told ARCCI that she had seen a cut wound on the victim's leg, which led her to believe the victim's underwear had been cut off. After the New York Times "Screams Without Words" article, Wessely told media that Abdush had been raped, burned, and murdered.

Eti Bracha, Gal's mother; Rami Bracha, Gal's brother; and Nagi's mother all believe that Gal was raped. Eti stated that "there are witnesses who saw the sexual assault of my daughter" and emphasized the importance that the world knows about "the sexual assaults committed by these monsters, that they don't close their eyes and say they don't believe it really happened." Nagi's mother lamented how her son saw his wife sexually assaulted before being shot. Rami stated that "the feeling was difficult" learning his sister was raped and "knowing what she went through before she was shot and murdered".

Nissim Abdush, brother of Gal's husband Nagi, who was also killed, and Abdush's two sisters Miral Altar and Tali Barakha, have all cast doubt on the claim that Gal was raped. Nissim was interviewed on Channel 13 on 1 January 2024 and repeatedly denied that Gal was raped. He said Nagi had called him at 7 AM, saying his wife was killed but never mentioned anything related to sexual assault. Abdush reiterated that Gal had not been raped and that "the media invented it".

Tali posted on Instagram: "No one can know what Gal went through there! Also, what Nagi went through, but I can't cooperate with those who say many things that are not true. I plead with you to stop spreading lies, there is a family and children behind them, no one can know if there was rape or if she was burned while alive. Have you gone mad? I spoke to Nagi personally! At 7 o'clock, Gal was killed by those animals, and they shot her in the heart. Nagi was alive until quarter past eight..."

Miral Altar, Gal's sister, wrote on Instagram: "It's clear that the dress is lifted upwards and not in its natural state, and half her head is burned because they threw a grenade at the car... At 6:51, Gal WhatsApp'ed saying 'we are at the border'...At 7 AM, my brother-in-law (Nagi) called his brother (Nissim) and said they shot Gal and she's dying. It doesn't make any sense that in four minutes, they raped her, slaughtered her, and burned her?" She subsequently deleted the post. The New York Times reported that "critics circulated images of it to assert falsely that the family had renounced the article". She later told the Times she regretted her post being used to question whether Palestinian militants had raped women, and that she had been "confused about what happened" and was trying to "protect" her sister, adding: "Did she suffer? Did she die right away?"..."I want to hope she didn't suffer, but we will never know."

==== Esther / Witness S / Sapir ====
In October 2023, Israeli police showed multiple journalists a video of a woman whom Le Parisien called "Esther" and BBC called "Witness S" describing what she had seen from her hiding place near the festival: a militant bent someone over, then "Esther" understood that he was raping the victim; the militant passed her on to someone else; she was still alive and bleeding from her back; the men cut off parts of her body, sliced her breast, threw it on the street and played with it; another militant raped her, then while still penetrating her, shot her in the head, and then ejaculated. Two months later, in December 2023, the New York Times reported accounts with very similar themes from a witness identified as "Sapir".

==== Knesset ====
A survivor told a Knesset panel her account, saying she saw naked girls, sliced bodies and violated girls whose pelvises were broken due to the extent of the abuse. An unnamed witness claims they found the festival vicinity an "apocalypse of bodies, girls without clothes, some missing their upper, some their lower parts".

==== Yoni Saadon ====
Survivor Yoni Saadon recounted to The Times: "they had caught a young woman near a car and she was fighting back, not allowing them to strip her. They threw her to the ground and one of the terrorists took a shovel and beheaded her and her head rolled along the ground. I see that head too".

==== Route 232 ====
An unnamed man reportedly saw men in civilian clothes drag a woman out of a van in route 232 nearby, gather around her and penetrate her while she screamed, and that one of the men then killed her with a knife. Three other unnamed persons testified seeing women raped and killed there and at one other location along route 232.

==== Anonymous victim testimony "D." ====
In July 2024 an anonymous male survivor of the Nova festival massacre identified as "D." recounted his rape on 7 October to Israel's Channel 12, becoming the first victim to do so. In his testimony he said: "They were Nukhba terrorists, actually pinning you to the ground...You try to resist. They take off your clothes, laugh at you, humiliate you, spit at you. They touched private parts, rape you." The Times of Israel reported that D. "presented various sources with medical opinions that testify to the harm done to him, as well as sitting for a polygraph test", and that "his testimony is also included in a major lawsuit filed by more than 100 survivors of the Supernova festival against the State of Israel, demanding more than NIS 500 million ($137 million) in government support."

==== Other accounts ====
An unnamed male witness told the BBC that he had heard what he was sure were the screams of women being raped and that dead women were raped as well. Another survivor, Ron Freger, told the Associated Press that he heard a woman screaming "They're raping me, they're raping me" followed by several gunshots, at which point she fell silent.

The Association of Rape Crisis Centers in Israel (ARCCI) cited four sources: Video of "the woman in the black dress", the Sunday Times report on Yoni Saadon, the account given at the Knesset, and Sky News reports of ZAKA responders who say bodies arrived partially clothed or unclothed, some with heavy pelvic bleeding and/or genital mutilation, which ARCCI asserts align with the other accounts.

=== Kibbutzim ===
==== Alleged rapes at Kibbutz Be'eri ====
In Kibbutz Be'eri, a paramedic from the 669 Special Tactics Rescue Unit said he went house to house looking for anyone still alive after the attack and found the bodies of two teenage girls in a bedroom. He said that he had no doubt one of the teenagers had been raped, but he did not know if she had died first. Two bodies of women were reportedly found with legs and hands tied to their beds, one of whose genitals were stabbed with a knife and internal organs removed.

In March 2024, The Intercept reported that these were teenage sisters Y. and N. Sharabi, ages 13 and 16. In a Channel 12 interview, new Times reporter Anat Schwartz said she tried but failed to find a second witness to confirm that the girls had been sexually assaulted after the paramedic told her his story about them. Similarly, in March the UN special representative stated that, at Kibbutz Be'eri, her team "was able to determine that at least two allegations of sexual violence widely repeated in the media were unfounded due to either new superseding information or inconsistency in the facts gathered.". In March 2024, The Intercept noted that Kibbutz Be'eri's spokesperson Michal Paikin rejected the story of rapes of taking place there that the New York Times had included in its article. He said "they were shot and were not subjected to sexual abuse".

Channel 12 published an interview in late February 2024 with the girls' grandparents, which The Intercept said contradicted the Times reporting that the girls were sexually assaulted and found alone in a bedroom: instead the grandmother said that the girls "were just shot — nothing else had been done to them", and that the girls were "found between the 'mamad' — the house's safe room — and the dining room", while the grandfather said that a soldier told him the girls' mother "was covering the two girls and they were shot". Earlier in October 2023, the grandmother had told BBC News that the girls were "found all cuddled together with [their mother] doing what a mother would do — holding her babies in her arms, trying to protect them at the end".

The New York Times later reported that video evidence contradicted the paramedic's claims about the girls supposedly being found in Be'eri with their clothes removed showing signs of abuse. Video evidence, which the Times verified, showed three girls "fully clothed and with no apparent signs of sexual violence". No other home in Be'eri had multiple female teenage victims. The medic declined to say if he stood by his story, though the Israeli military said that he did but that he may have been mistaken on the location.

==== Other accounts ====
The New York Times viewed photographs of a woman's corpse found in a kibbutz that had dozens of nails driven into her groin and thighs.

The ARCCI Report cited 6 cases and sources:

- Unspecified "testimonies collected" in Be'eri about "bodies of women and girls who were raped, mostly in their bedrooms... in their pajamas"
- Reuters, CNN, BBC, and Times of Israel reports of ZAKA volunteers who said they found bodies of women and girls without underwear, signs of semen, and one with a knife inserted into her genital area
- Chaim Otmazgin, a ZAKA commander who told ARCCI he saw two women's bodies naked with objects penetrating their bodies
- Nira Shpak of Kfar Aza who told ARCCI she saw several bodies with genitals exposed, some with torn clothes
- Noam Mark, emergency security team member at Re'im, who told ARCCI he found three bodies of women from the festival in a house, naked, with "clear signs of severe sexual violence". ARCCI says he provided police supporting video.
- New York Times reports of at least 24 bodies with signs of sexual abuse in Be'eri and Kfar Aza

=== IDF bases ===
Many of the bodies discovered in the various scenes were brought to the IDF Military Rabbinate Camp Shura, which hosts facilities for body identification.

Haaretz reported in April 2024 that "According to a source knowledgeable about the details, there were no signs on any of those bodies [at the Shura base] attesting to sexual relations having taken place or of mutilation of genitalia", further explaining that more than 75 percent of the bodies were buried without having undergone a professional examination, and that many of bodies there were examined were in such bad physical condition that in many cases the bodies' conditions afforded no possibility of determining what the victims had undergone before their death, with at least 100 such cases.

==== Shari Mendes ====
Shari Mendes, an army reservist stationed at the Shura camp, recounted in an event at the United Nations that her team discovered female soldiers who were shot in their vagina or breasts, and reported that it appeared there was systematic genital mutilation by Hamas militants. She further stated that they found beheaded bodies or bodies with missing limbs or bodies whose faces were mutilated, with some faces shot multiple times post-mortem. According to Mendes, bodies were found with little or no clothing, and some were only wearing bloodied underwear. Mendes provided testimony based on her observations of the dead, conveyed in a recorded video.

In a February 2024 investigation The Intercept reported that Mendes became a prominent figure in Israeli government and media narratives on 7 October sexual violence "despite the fact that she has no medical or forensic credentials to legally determine rape." The Intercept also questioned Mendes' credibility based on a testimony she gave to the Daily Mail in October 2023 of what she had seen, including: "A baby was cut out of a pregnant woman and beheaded and then the mother was beheaded." The official Israeli list of those killed in the attacks did not list a pregnant woman.

==== Captain Maayan ====
IDF Captain Maayan who was a dentist and member of the medical forensic team identifying bodies at the Shura base, said that she had encountered several bodies showing signs consistent with sexual abuse, recounting "I can tell that I saw a lot of signs of abuse in the [genital region] [...] We saw broken legs, broken pelvises, bloody underwear".

==== Lt. Tamar Bar Shimon ====
Lt. Tamar Bar Shimon, survivor of the attack at the military base attached to the Erez crossing, said that a Hamas member tried to undress her, but another Hamas militant stopped him, after which both left the room in which she was hiding.

==== Moshe Pinchi video ====
Moshe Pinchi shared a Hamas-filmed video that the IDF had recovered of two soldiers shot in the genitals.

The ARCCI Report cited as evidence "Screams Without Words", Mendes, Maayan, Bar-Shimon, and Pinchi.

=== In captivity in Gaza ===
One of the Israeli hostages released during the temporary truce in late November and early December 2023 recounted to The Jerusalem Post that at least three women were sexually assaulted by their Hamas captors. The Associated Press reported that an unnamed Israeli doctor who treated 110 of the released hostages said that least 10 men and women had been sexually assaulted or abused while in captivity. The released hostages underwent pregnancy tests and were screened for sexually transmitted diseases.

Two Israeli doctors as well as an unnamed Israeli military official confirmed to USA Today that Israeli women in captivity underwent sexual abuse in their captivity. One of the doctors also said that "many of the 30 females from ages 12 to 48 suffered sexual assault during captivity". Another doctor said that many of the women who had witnessed sexual assaults were experiencing PTSD. The Israeli military official said "we know that female hostages were raped during their captivity under control of Hamas."

In January 2024, a video taken October 2023 emerged showing 4 female Israeli soldiers held hostage: Liri Albag, Karina Ariev, Daniela Gilboa, and Agam Berger. After this, released hostage Chen Goldstein-Almog reported having seen some of them who had told her that their captors had sexually abused them multiple times.

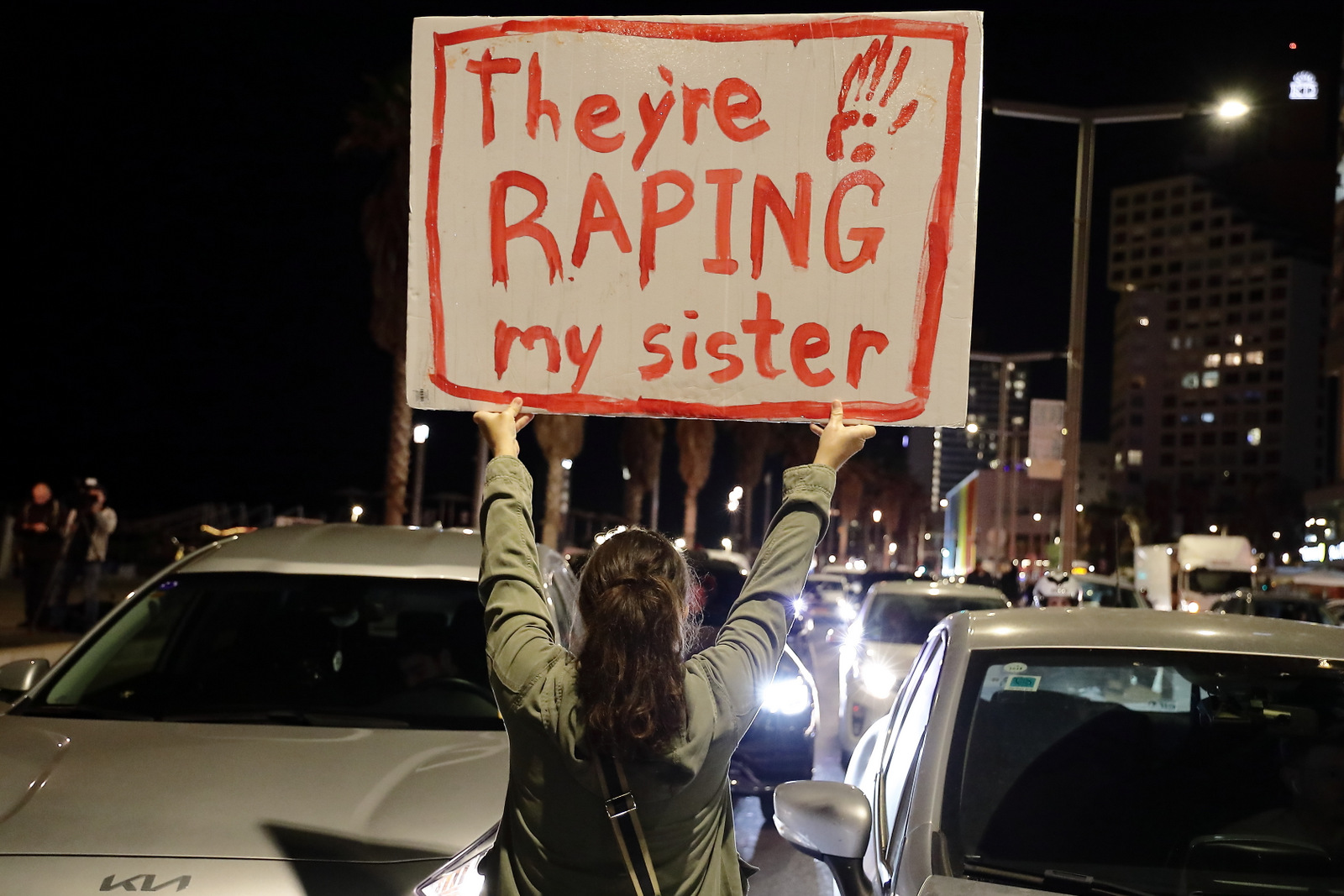
Israeli protestor holding sign alluding to sexual assault of hostages in front of US Embassy in Tel Aviv in March 2024

The ARCCI report cited the Times of Israel report plus two statements from former hostages from Kfar Aza: Chen and Agam Goldstein said they had encountered 3 female hostages who told them that captors had sexually assaulted them; and Kan ran a story with Aviva Sigal who said she saw a woman whom captors had just assaulted when taking her to the restroom, and said that captors turned women and men into "puppets on a string".

A UN report in March 2024 concluded that there was "clear and convincing information" that Israeli hostages in Gaza experienced "sexual violence, including rape" and there were "reasonable grounds" to believe such abuse is "ongoing against those still held in captivity".

Former hostage Amit Soussana said in a March 2024 in an interview with The New York Times that she had been sexually abused while held captive by Hamas in Gaza. She was taken captive on 7 October. Around 24 October, her assailant, who called himself Muhammad, dragged her at gunpoint to a child's bedroom, where Soussana said that "he, with the gun pointed at me, forced me to commit a sexual act on him."

A medical report was filed jointly by senior Israeli gynecologist, Julia Barda, and a social worker, Valeria Tsekhovsky. Barda stated that "Amit spoke immediately, fluently and in detail, not only about her sexual assault but also about the many other ordeals she experienced."

Siegal Sadetzki, a professor at Tel Aviv University Faculty of Medicine, recounted that Soussana first told her about the sexual assault within days of her release and also reported Soussana's accounts have remained consistent. Soussana also described to NYT being detained in roughly six sites, including private homes, an office and a subterranean tunnel.

In a March 2025 interview with The New York Times, former hostage Ilana Gritzewsky said she had been sexually assaulted during her captivity. According to Gritzwesky, she was groped, and after passing out along the way, she woke up with her shirt lifted up and pants pulled down as seven gunmen stood over her. She did not know what happened while she was passed out but said telling them she was on her period likely saved her from worse.

The International Criminal Court, issuing an arrest warrant for the attack's alleged mastermind Mohammed Deif, stated that there were reasonable grounds to believe some Israeli hostages were subjected to sexual and gender based violence while held captive in Gaza.

In a November 2025 interview, former hostage Rom Braslavski told Channel 13 that he had been sexually abused and tortured during his time in captivity. According to Braslavski, he was stripped naked and tied up. He believes the aim was to humiliate him and strip him of his dignity. He described his time in captivity as "hell".

Guy Gilboa-Dalal, who was held in captivity for hostage for two years, revealed in an interview to Channel 12 in November 2025 that he was sexually abused. He recalled a Hamas militant abusing him by rubbing his genitals against him for several minutes while he stood motionless, even though Gilboa-Dalal told him: "You're joking, right? This is forbidden in Islam". The guard then threatened to kill him if he spoke about this. Gilboa-Dalal feared that the assaults would escalate to forced anal penetration. During another incident, a guard allegedly took him to a separate room tied him to a chair, then made sexual threats while touching all over his body, kissing his neck and back, telling him he loved him.

== Notable reports ==
=== Report by Israeli rape crisis center association ===
In February 2024, the Association of Rape Crisis Centers in Israel (ARCCI) published its survey of the sexual violence carried out during the attack. The 35-page report, based in part on statements from ZAKA members, suggested that the attacks were more widespread than initially believed, occurring at various locations across southern Israel and in captivity in Gaza. It reported that in some instances, rapes were carried out in the presence of an audience, including partners, family, or friends, with the apparent intention of increasing pain, humiliation and trauma. It concluded there was evidence for a "systematic, targeted sexual abuse" of women during the Hamas-led assault on southern Israel on 7 October, that ignited the war in Gaza.

ARCCI stated that the report included new testimony that it received "from professionals and confidential calls" and that "arrived at ARCCI centers".

=== New York Times' "Screams Without Words" ===
A New York Times article by Jeffrey Gettleman, Anat Schwartz, and Adam Sella, released in late December 2023, found at least seven locations where sexual assaults and mutilations of Israeli women and girls were carried out. It concluded that these were not isolated events but part of a broader pattern of gender-based violence during the 7 October massacres. The newspaper's probe concluded that Hamas "weaponized sexual violence" during the attacks.

The editorial process behind the article was scrutinized in investigative reports in The Intercept and criticized by more than 50 journalism professors from top universities, with concerns raised including the use of inexperienced reporters, an over-reliance on witness testimony, weak corroboration, and a lack of supporting forensic evidence. The Times stood by its story, saying that it was "rigorously reported, sourced and edited". In October 2025 over 300 New York Times contributors boycotted the paper with demands that included the retraction of the article for what they said was its failure to meet journalistic standards.

=== UN report of March 2024 ===
After pressure from the Israeli government and others, the UN's Special Representative on Sexual Violence in Conflict Pramila Patten declared a fact-finding mission to Israel, an unprecedented move for her office. She and her team spent two weeks in Israel and the West-Bank at the invitation of the Israeli government. Azadeh Moaveni reported: "Her office didn't have a mandate to investigate sexual crimes on the ground and had never undertaken such a mission before. I was told by multiple sources at the UN that her trip was a matter of fierce controversy within the organisation."

On 4 March 2024, Patten's United Nations team published a report concluding that "there are reasonable grounds to believe that conflict-related sexual violence occurred during the 7 October attacks in multiple locations across Gaza periphery, including rape and gang-rape, in at least three locations", namely the Nova music festival, nearby Road 232, and kibbutz Re'im. The mission did not manage to independently verify media reports of sexual violence in Nahal Oz kibbutz and Kfar Aza kibbutz.

The UN team was also "unable to establish the prevalence of sexual violence", and "did not gather information and/or draw conclusions on attribution of alleged violations to specific armed groups", due to the lack of a "fully-fledged" investigation. The report concludes that "specific attribution of the violations would require a fully-fledged investigation". Patten later requested permission to investigate Hamas' alleged crimes, on condition that her team should also be allowed to access Israeli detention facilities to examine claims of sexual violence by Israeli soldiers, but the request was denied.

The UN "mission was not investigative", but was designed to collect and confirm allegations, with information being in "large part sourced from Israeli national institutions", stated the report. Separately, Patten told the media that the Israeli government fully cooperated with them, with the mission finding the information given to be "authentic and unmanipulated". The report noted that the mission collected "Credible circumstantial information, which may be indicative of some forms of sexual violence, including genital mutilation, sexualized torture, or cruel, inhuman and degrading treatment".

The report also found "clear and convincing information" to show that Israeli hostages in Gaza had been subject to "sexual violence, including rape, sexualized torture, and cruel, inhumane and degrading treatment". According to the UN report, its "witnesses and sources ... adopted over time an increasingly cautious and circumspect approach regarding past accounts, including in some cases retracting statements made previously", with some disavowing confidence in allegations they had previously made to media outlets.

An investigation by The Times which includes an interview with Patten reiterates that her report was not a full and legal investigation, did not establish anything beyond a reasonable doubt, and cites Patten again calling on the Israeli government to cooperate with the UN agency tasked with an investigative mandate, the Commission of Inquiry.

On 23 April 2024, a UN report on sexual violence in 2023, authored by Secretary-General Antonio Guterres, included the October 7 violence along with 17 other global cases, drawing on Patten's report. But it did not include Hamas in the list of state and non-state parties guilty of sexual violence in 2023 due to Patten’s not being a full and legally mandated investigation, and called for one to be conducted.

=== UN report of June 2024 ===
The Independent International Commission of Inquiry on the Occupied Palestinian Territory released an in-depth investigative report on 12 June 2024 which found that both Hamas and Israel had committed sexual violence and torture, along with intentional attacks on civilians. The report was created by information compiled from interviews of victims, witnesses, open sourced items, forensic medical reports, and satellite imagery. Israel had previously announced its refusal to cooperate with the inquiry and rejected the allegations.

The commission found that Palestinian forces were responsible for incidents "indicative of sexual violence" at the Re'im festival and the Nahal Oz military outpost, as well as several kibbutzim. These incidents included the physical and sexual abuse of female abductees and "sexualized desecration" of corpses both male and female. It found Hamas targeted women, whose bodies were "used as victory trophies by male perpetrators [and] put on public display, either on the streets of the Gaza Strip or online."

The report concluded that the acts of sexual violence on 7 October were "not isolated incidents but perpetrated in similar ways in several locations and by multiple Palestinian perpetrators." The report concluded there was a pattern indicative of sexual violence by Palestinian forces during the attack, and that Hamas and other militant groups were responsible for gender-based violence "by willful killings, abductions, and physical, mental and sexual abuse".

The commission was unable to independently verify testimony of genital mutilation, sexual torture and rape, citing a lack of access to witnesses and crime scenes, and Israel's obstruction of its investigations. It also found no evidence that Palestinian forces had been ordered to commit sexual violence. In addition, the Commission found some specific allegations to be false or contradictory.

=== Physicians for Human Rights Israel ===
The NGO Physicians for Human Rights Israel (PHRI) published a position paper in November 2023, which brought together the accounts and reports published to date, testimonies of survivors, accounts by security and emergency personnel, and visual accounts published online. It concluded that there was significant evidence of acts of sexual and gender-based violence on 7 October and on-going risk to hostages: "Though we are unable to determine the dimensions of the harm inflicted, the accounts and reports of sexual abuse committed during the October 7 Hamas attacks, including those brought to our attention and those made public, provide sufficient evidence to require an investigation of crimes against humanity."

Mondoweiss published an opinion piece by Lana Tatour in December 2023 criticising PHRI's report, claiming it fell short of reporting standards. Tatour accused PHRI of failing to investigate accusations of sexual violence to the same standard as they had done elsewhere, noting that the PHRI director of ethics and policy said that "We haven't interviewed actual witnesses." Tatour also said, citing anonymous sources, that Palestinian staff members at PHRI had advocated against the report's publication because of its low evidentiary standards, but that Jewish members of staff had dismissed their concerns.

In May 2024 Physicians for Human Rights Israel published a "Clarification on the Organization's November 2023 Position Paper on Sexual Violence", expressing regret for including subsequently "disputed or deemed unverifiable" testimonies. They emphasize that their own position paper was not the "comprehensive and exhaustive investigation" needed, as "PHRI lacks the sufficient staffing, resources, or professional tools required to carry out the thorough and competent investigation advocated for in the position paper."

The new information that has come to light further reinforces our call for an investigation into the subject. It is crucial to recognize that due to the fragmented nature of traumatic memories, they are often expressed in incomplete, confused, or contradictory ways. Therefore, it is neither accurate nor just for persons lacking the required expertise and tools to assess the credibility of witnesses. Accordingly, moving forward, we will rely on the Patten report and, when available, additional reports and documents produced by competent investigative bodies.

They note that the Patten report found reasonable grounds to believe that conflict-related sexual violence occurred during the October attacks in multiple locations, as well as clear and convincing information that some hostages have been subjected to various forms of conflict-related sexual violence, which may be on-going. The group also condemned the "manipulative and cynical" exploitation of accounts of sexual violence on 7 October by the Israeli government and other entities "as part of a campaign to dehumanize Palestinians and as a propaganda tool to justify Israel's brutal military assault on the Gaza Strip."

=== Other investigations and reports ===
In December 2023, the BBC published the results of several interviews with people involved in collecting and identifying the bodies of those killed on 7 October, along with analysis of video testimony and open video footage filmed by Hamas of the attack.

In April 2024 Sheryl Sandberg's documentary Screams Before Silence, directed by Anat Stalinsky, was published on YouTube. The film focuses on sexual violence against Israelis on 7 October and in captivity in Gaza. It includes testimonies of men and women who survived the attack, abductees who were recently released including Amit Soussana, volunteers from ZAKA, as well as Israeli police and other officials.

In June 2024, The Times published a report stating that investigators believed that Israel's claims about the scale and the formally sanctioned, systematic nature of sexual assaults did not stand up to scrutiny.

In July 2025, the Jerusalem-based human rights organization The Dinah Project published a report which they allege shows that Hamas used sexual violence as a tactical weapon and genocidal scheme. The group was created after the 7 October attacks by legal scholar Ruth Halperin-Kaddar, lawyer and former prosecutor Sharon Zagagi-Pinhas and former judge and attorney general Nava Ben-Or. The publication compiles reports of "forced nudity, gang rapes, genital mutilation, and threats of forced marriage" during the 7 October attacks and in captivity based on eyewitness accounts, including from 15 returned hostages, one survivor testimony of attempted rape at a music festival, and interviews with first responders, morgue personnel and healthcare professionals.

United Nations Special Rapporteur on violence against women and girls, Reem Alsalem, responded to the publication of the report with a statement saying that while the U.N. special commission appointed to investigate "found patterns indicative of sexual violence against Israeli women at different locations, [t]he Commission was also unable to independently verify specific allegations of sexual and gender-based violence due to Israel’s obstruction of its investigations." In response to the central claim of the report, Alsalem stated: "It is my understanding that neither the Commission nor any other independent human rights mechanism established that sexual or gender-based violence was committed against Israelis on or since the 7th of October as a systematic tool of war or as a tool of genocide."

According to Drop Site News, The Dinah Project report "contains scant new evidence and largely aggregates existing reports, many of which have been discredited or called into question."

On 12 May 2026, the Israeli non-governmental organisation Civil Commission on October 7 Crimes by Hamas Against Women and Children published Silenced No More, a roughly 290-page report on sexual and gender-based violence during the 7 October 2023 attacks and against hostages held in Gaza. Based on more than 430 testimonies and interviews, and extensive visual evidence, the report concluded that such violence was "systematic, widespread, and integral" to the attacks and their aftermath, identifying recurring patterns including rape and gang rape, sexual torture and mutilation, forced nudity, executions linked to sexual violence, and abuse in captivity. The report included testimony from former hostages, including Romi Gonen, Arbel Yehud, Amit Soussana and Ilana Gritzewsky, and stated that women, men, children and minors were victims of sexual and gender-based violence.

Le Monde described it as the most comprehensive investigation to date into sexual violence committed during the attacks, while noting evidentiary difficulties caused by the scale of the attack, destruction of bodies, chaotic recovery conditions and limited forensic collection. The commission characterised the documented acts as war crimes, crimes against humanity, torture, persecution, terrorism-linked sexual and gender-based violence, and genocidal acts, while the extent, organisation and legal classification of the crimes remain matters for judicial determination.

== Controversies ==
=== False reports from ZAKA ===
The mostly ultra-orthodox ZAKA volunteer paramedic and rescue group began collecting bodies immediately after the Hamas attacks, while the IDF avoided assigning soldiers with training to carefully retrieve and document human remains in post-terrorism situations. ZAKA spokesman Simcha Greeneman said in one kibbutz he came across a dead woman with sharp objects in her vagina, including nails. However, as part of the effort to get media exposure, ZAKA spread accounts of atrocities that never happened, released sensitive and graphic photos, and acted unprofessionally on the ground, often mixing up remains of multiple victims in the same bag and creating little or no documentation about the remains. Because ZAKA took several months to acknowledge these accounts were wrong, they proliferated widely. Additionally, while speaking with reporters in March 2024 a member of the organization and IDF reservist stated that he had modified the clothing on the remains of women at the Nova music festival in order to preserve their dignity before taking an identification photograph.

On 22 May 2024, the Associated Press published a report detailing two false accounts of sexual and gender-based violence on 7 October. One of the accounts was given by Yossi Landau, a longtime volunteer for the ZAKA paramedic and rescue group. Landau claimed that as he was working in Kibbutz Be'eri, he found a pregnant woman lying on the floor with her fetus still attached to the umbilical cord and removed from her body. The AP reports that Landau then "went on to tell the story to journalists and was cited in outlets around the world." ZAKA spokesperson Moti Bukjin said it took some time before they realized Landau's account was not true, and they told him to stop repeating it; however, he continued to do so as he remained convinced it was true. The United Nations also confirmed Landau's account is false. Along with other first responders, Landau also told journalists he had seen beheaded children and babies. However, the AP notes that "No convincing evidence had been publicized to back up that claim, and it was debunked by Haaretz and other major media outlets."

The second false account in the AP report came from ZAKA commander Chaim Otmazgin. He said that upon entering a home in Kibbutz Be'eri, he discovered the body of a teenage girl with her pants pulled down, separated from her relatives. He assumed this meant she had been raped, and testified to this in the Knesset and to journalists. However, the AP reports that ZAKA found this interpretation to be wrong three months later: "After cross-checking with military contacts, ZAKA found that a group of soldiers had dragged the girl's body across the room to make sure it wasn't booby-trapped. During the procedure, her pants had come down." Otmazgin told the AP he realized such false accounts could cause damage but he felt he had resolved it by correcting his account months later.

Shortly after 7 October, Cochav Elkayam-Levy, a legal expert from the Davis Institute for International Relations at Hebrew University of Jerusalem, former Israeli government lawyer, former member of the military spokesperson's unit and close associate of Prime Minister Netanyahu's, established the Civil Commission on October 7th Crimes by Hamas against Women and Children, which aimed to give voice to the victims and their families. Elyakam-Levy stated that she was driven to create the report in the wake of silence and opposition from former allies when she came to address the United Nations after the attacks and as part of an effort to create an independent report that would document how "Hamas itself had uploaded and distributed large quantities of material to cause as much psychological damage as possible." In June 2024 The Times reported that Elkayam-Levy spread a "debunked story" about a "pregnant woman and her slaughtered foetus", while also circulating "photographs of murdered female soldiers that turned out to be images of Kurdish fighters in Syria." The Times adds: "Elkayam-Levy has nonetheless remained the most prominent public voice on the sexual violence of October 7, winning the country's highest civilian honour, the Israel Prize, in April."

=== Claims of "weaponization" and "mass" rape as pro-Israeli propaganda ===
In February 2024, The Hill host Briahna Joy Gray criticized U.S. State Department allegations that Hamas had raped female Israeli hostages, and in particular criticized the characterization of the sexual violence as "mass rape" rather than individual acts, or "weaponization of rape" as being Israeli war propaganda. Max Blumenthal of The Grayzone stated that "Israel is inventing stories of mass rape on October 7."

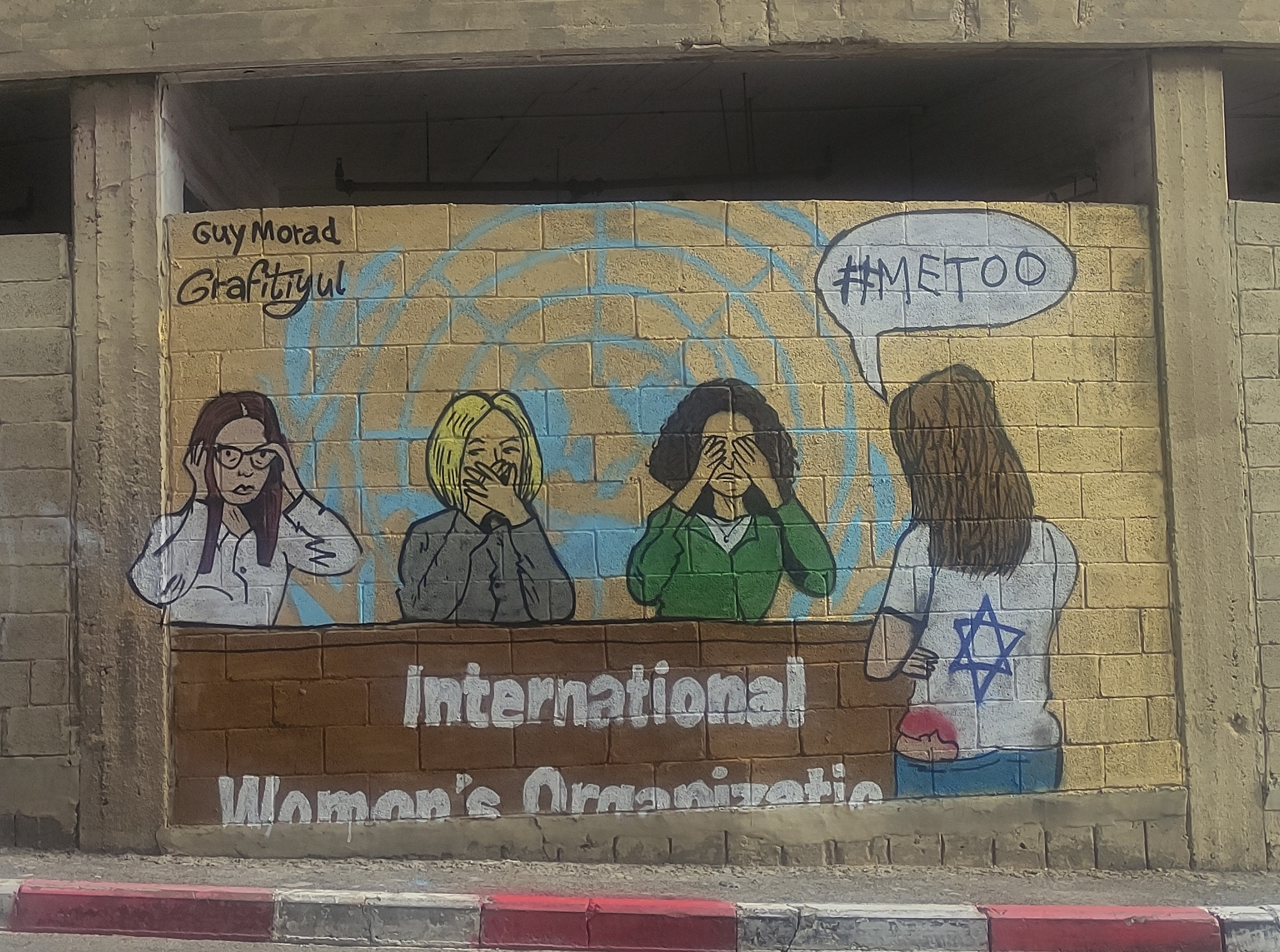
Graffiti in Tel Aviv protesting the global women's organizations' perceived inaction and dismissal of the evidence of sexual violence in the context of the 7 October attacks

=== United Nations and human rights groups ===
The United Nations, particularly the United Nations Committee on the Elimination of Discrimination Against Women (CEDAW), were criticized by Jewish and Israeli media and advocates for not condemning rapes of Israeli women after being presented with evidence and witness testimonies. Israel condemned the UN for its response. The Israeli First Lady, Michal Herzog, called the response of international organizations such as UN Women an "inconceivable and unforgivable silence". UN Women briefly condemned Hamas in a post, but deleted the post shortly after. Jewish and Israeli media and advocacy organizations criticized UN Women and the #MeToo movement, saying they did not condemn the violence against women that took place during the 7 October attack. In response to UN Women, US- and Israel-based activists created the slogan "#MeToo Unless You're A Jew". Israeli law professor Cochav Elkayam-Levy told The New York Times that she sent a letter signed by dozens of scholars to UN Women on 2 November, calling for condemnation of sexual violence during the attack; she said she did not receive a response. A bipartisan group of more than 80 members of the US congress said the response of UN Women was "woefully unsatisfactory and consistent with the UN's longstanding bias against Israel".

Israeli human rights group Physicians for Human Rights Israel called for the International Criminal Court to investigate the sexual violence accusations. UN special rapporteur Reem Alsalem was criticized by Claire Waxman, London's Victims' Commissioner, and the Simon Wiesenthal Center, as she did not speak out on reports of sexual and gender-based violence in the 7 October attack on Israel against Israeli women during and following the Hamas-led attack, reportedly labeling accounts of sexual violence as "disinformation".

On 25 November in Paris, a group of about 200 protestors attempted to join the International Day for the Elimination of Violence Against Women march. Some carried Israeli flags and signs "denounc[ing] the deafening silence of feminist groups". The group was "effectively barred from joining the march" by pro-Palestine activists; march organizers later released a statement expressing "unambiguous condemnation of the sexual and sexist crimes, rapes and femicides committed by Hamas", they also accused far-right activists of stoking tensions at the march and seeking to discredit its organisers. On 1 December, UN Women stated "We unequivocally condemn the brutal attacks by Hamas on Israel on 7 October". Israeli politician Zehava Galon criticized the organization, writing that "the UN women's organization took almost two months... to issue a pale condemnation." On 4 December, human rights' organizations, including Jewish ones as well as their supporters, protested in front of the United Nations headquarters in New York, some dressed in only their underwear and with synthetic blood smeared on their bodies. Former U.S. representative Carolyn Maloney stated: "We're here supporting Israeli women who were brutally raped. They deserve the support of other women. Any other attack on women would be treated as a crime."

In response Sarah Hendrik, an official from UN Women, one of the UN agencies subject to these criticisms, stated that "within the UN family, these investigations are led by the Office of the High Commission for Human Rights', and that her agency didn't have the legal competence to determine culpability: 'The Independent International Commission of Inquiry has the mandate to investigate all alleged violations." Azadeh Moaveni reported that claims of double standards or lack of condemnation by UN Women were incorrect, as "UN Women has not inveighed against conflict-related sexual violence in Yemen, Afghanistan, Somalia, Libya, Colombia or Mali, and its condemnations of rape in the DRC, Central African Republic, Syria and Iraq came years after the events themselves. Where it has responded more swiftly (and then only within months), it has done so in places where the UN had teams on the ground investigating and documenting abuses, or as a result of UN-wide appeals. UN Women has never named a specific group or perpetrator. According to its own protocols, it has been vociferous in responding to 7 October – as many as eight times in the first two months – through statements, social media posts and session remarks." Moaveni also notes that what was demanded of UN Women was to go beyond its mandate and name in an unprecedented way before a proper investigation by the mandated UN bodies had been carried out, and that if it had done so it would have significantly damaged its relationships with grassroots women's groups. A UN official told her that "[t]he call to condemn Hamas 'was a trap, like the one laid out for the university presidents."

On 28 November, UN Secretary-General António Guterres said that there were numerous accounts of sexual violence during the 7 October attack; he said the incidents "must be vigorously investigated and prosecuted". A UN commission of inquiry investigating war crimes on both sides of the Israel-Hamas conflict will include a focus on instances of sexual violence by Hamas.

Israel's Permanent Representative to the UN, Gilad Erdan, states due to Israel having zero trust with the Commission of Inquiry because of alleged pre-existing antisemitic prejudice against Israel from the commission's leadership, Israel will boycot cooperation with the Independent International Commission of Inquiry on the Occupied Palestinian Territory. Navi Pillay, who chairs the UN inquiry, rejected claims that the UN had delayed acknowledging the sexual violence and said that, despite Israel not cooperating, her team could still take evidence from survivors and witnesses outside of the country: "All they [Israel] have to do is let us in," she told the BBC.

On 8 January 2024, two U.N. experts on torture and on extrajudicial executions demanded accountability for sexual violence against Israeli civilians by Hamas. They said that a substantial body of evidence supported the occurrence of rapes and genital mutilation, indicating potential crimes against humanity. On 16 January, Guterres again stated the accounts must be "rigorously investigated and prosecuted". Keeping with the boycott Israel's Health Ministry instructed members of the healthcare system to not cooperate with the Independent International Commission of Inquiry on the Occupied Palestinian Territory, citing its perceived anti-Israel stance.

Meanwhile, early March 2024, the United Nations Special Representative of the Secretary-General on Sexual Violence in Conflict (SRSG-SVC), Pramila Patten, began a fact-finding mission to Israel and the West Bank to verify information concerning sexual and gender-based violence committed by Hamas. During her week-long visit, Patten and her team reviewed raw footage from 7 October, met with released captives from Gaza, and heard their testimonies. Patten visited various locations, including the Nova festival site in Re'im, Gaza border communities, and the military base in Nahal Oz, to gain insights into sexual crimes committed by Hamas, and findings were submitted to the UN Secretary-General and the Security Council in March. The report was published 4 March 2024.

=== Other incidents ===
The director of the University of Alberta Sexual Assault Centre in Canada was fired after she signed a letter questioning the rape reports. After being criticized, student newspaper Yale Daily News issued an apology for issuing editors' notes that challenged statements of rapes during the 7 October attack.

Sean Durns of the pro-Israel media monitor Committee for Accuracy in Middle East Reporting in America complained that the Washington Post did not present mass rape on 7 October as a fact.

== Hamas response ==
Hamas officials, including Basem Naim, denied that its own militants committed sexual violence as a weapon of war, citing Islamic principles that forbid any sexual relationship outside of marriage. Hamas instead said that any sexual violence that occurred should be blamed on militants of other Palestinian groups that breached the Israel-Gaza border on 7 October. Hamas accused Western media of bias and said the reports of sexual violence demonized "Palestinian resistance". They also demanded that The New York Times apologize following a report on the matter.

Naim stated that the New York Times report on sexual violence lacked conclusive evidence, argued that testimonies from Israeli women contradict the report, and cited Hamas's alleged good treatment of female hostages in Gaza Strip. Basem Naim also remarked that the operation on 7 October was "very short", adding that Hamas' militants only had enough time to complete their mission "to crush the enemy's military sites".

== International responses ==
The Maltese, Spanish and Panamanian ambassadors to Israel condemned the actions of Hamas in a 27 November 2023 Knesset panel. The Canadian ambassador in the same panel lamented the quiet response to actions against Israeli women in the same panel.

The Foreign Affairs Minister of Canada, Mélanie Joly, has pledged $1 million to support Israeli victims of sexual violence. Ottawa has not said which groups will receive the $1 million, nor when.

=== United Nations ===
In August 2025 UN General-Secretary Guterres announced his intentions to add Hamas to the UN's blacklist of "parties credibly suspected of committing or being responsible for patterns of rape or other forms of sexual violence in situations of armed conflict on the agenda", and warned Israel could also be placed on it the following year unless it takes "necessary measures to ensure immediate cessation of all acts of sexual violence." Senior Hamas official Basem Naim responded to the news by saying: "We categorically reject all these allegations. These are certainly new attempts to use lies to divert attention from the ongoing brutal crimes committed by [the Israeli] fascist government and its army against our people in Gaza."

=== United States ===
In a speech on 10 October, US president Joe Biden condemned Hamas, stating that the events represented "pure, unadulterated evil". Former US secretary of state Hillary Clinton condemned the use of rape in war as a crime against humanity.

Former Facebook COO Sheryl Sandberg, founder of Lean In, a women's rights and advancement group also condemned the rape as a crime against humanity and attacked UN silence as dangerous. Sandberg also described Hamas' rape of women as a weapon of war.

On 4 December, spokesperson for the United States Department of State Matthew Miller said that the Biden administration had not made an explicit condemnation of rape on 7 October because they had not conducted an independent assessment, and not because they doubted the reports. On 5 December, Joe Biden called for global condemnation of "the sexual violence of Hamas terrorists without equivocation", calling the events "horrific". Five days later, U.S. Secretary of State Antony Blinken called the sexual violence inflicted by Hamas "almost beyond human description or beyond our capacity to digest", and criticized international organizations such as UN Women for being too slow to condemn them.

On 12 December 33 US Democratic and Republican senators demanded in a letter to the UN secretary general that the UN begin investigating sexual and gender-based crimes committed by Hamas on 7 October 2023. They further requested the United Nations begin collecting testimonies from survivors and witnesses.

=== European Union ===
In April 2024, the European Union sanctioned military and special forces wings of Hamas and the armed wing of Palestinian Islamic Jihad due to their responsibility for the sexual violence on 7 October. An asset freeze and travel ban were imposed on the Qassam and Al-Quds Brigades and the Nukhba Force. The EU said the groups' fighters "committed widespread sexual and gender-based violence in a systematic manner, using it as a weapon of war."

=== International Criminal Court ===
In May 2024, Karim Ahmad Khan, chief prosecutor of the International Criminal Court, announced that he was seeking to charge Hamas leaders Yahya Sinwar, Ismail Haniyeh and Mohammed Deif with war crimes and crimes against humanity, including rape and sexual assault against those held captive in Gaza. Deif was indicted for rape and other forms of sexual violence as a war crime and a crime against humanity on 21 November, by which time cases against Haniyeh and Sinwar had been discontinued due to their deaths.

== See also ==
- Bearing Witness (2023 film)
- Denial of the October 7 attacks
- Gaza war hostage crisis
- War crimes in the Gaza war
