= Silenced No More =

2026 Israeli investigative report on sexual violence during October 7 attacks

Silenced No More Sexual Terror Unveiled: The Untold Atrocities of October 7 and Against Hostages in Captivity is an report issued by the Israeli non-profit Civil Commission on October 7th Crimes by Hamas Against Women and Children in May 2026, documenting sexual and gender-based violence (SGBV) conducted by Hamas on October 7, 2023 as well as the continued sexual abuse of hostages throughout their captivity in Gaza. The Civil Commission on October 7th Crimes by Hamas Against Women and Children is an independent non-profit created to document and bring to light the Hamas sexual atrocities against women, men, and children.

The report reveals that sexual violence was not random but an integral part of a planned terrorizing strategy by Hamas. It was widespread and consisted of 13 types of violence intended to inflict pain and suffering, including gang rape, sexual torture (burning, gender mutilation and insertion of objects), threats of imposed marriages, postmortem sexual abuse, humiliation, and desecration of bodies, and forced nudity.

== Report details ==
The report covers a two year effort in which the Commission reviewed over 10,000 relevant photographs 1800 hours of video footage and transcripts, conducted over 430 interviews/meetings with witnesses, hostages, experts and families and reviewed official records, and other primary materials. A large team of legal experts, researchers, documenters, and trauma experts were involved in the research. The documentation was cross-referenced and mapped and stored online in a digital archive.

It includes testimony from former hostages, among them Romi Gonen, Arbel Yehud, Amit Soussana and Ilana Gritzewsky, who have spoken publicly about their experiences of sexual abuse and gender mistreatment during captivity. According to CNN, the report also documented allegations of sexual abuse involving minors held hostage in Gaza, based on confidential testimony provided to investigators and medical professionals and trauma specialists.

Hon. Irwin Cotler, International Chair, Raoul Wallenberg Centre for Human Rights and former Ministerof Justice and Attorney General of Canada, wrote the foreword to the report, and stated

“Atrocities do not begin with the machinery of killing. They begin with a failure to believe victims.”

The study concludes that the sexual and gender-based violence deployed was a key strategy of the October 7th attacks and their aftermath. It took place at multiple locations and not only on October 7 but during abduction, transfer, and captivity, and including extreme pain, humiliation, and cruelty.

== UN Special representative on sexual violence in conflict ==
The researchers of the Commission submitted a letter to UN Women in October 2023 regarding the atrocities and they submitted a preliminary legal report to the United Nations, later that month. The UN’s Special Representative on Sexual Violence in Conflict, Pramila Patten, and her team visited in late January 2024 and issued a mission report on the visit, in which they found " that there are reasonable grounds to believe that conflict-related sexual violence occurred in multiple locations during the 7 October attacks, including rape and gang-rape in at least three locations, namely: the Nova music festival site and its surroundings, Road 232, and Kibbutz Re’im. In most of these incidents, victims first subjected to rape were then killed, and at least two incidents relate to the rape of women’s corpses." The mission team also found evidence similar to those cited in the report of victims found naked, bound and shot, with indications of torture and other cruel treatment.

== Reactions ==
Le Monde described the report as the most comprehensive investigation to date into sexual violence committed during the attacks. The report’s conclusions were presented as broadly consistent with earlier findings and documentation efforts such as the Dinah Project, the United Nations Office of the Special Representative of the Secretary-General on Sexual Violence in Conflict (OSRSG-SVC),and Silent Cry, the report issued by the Association of Rape Crisis Centers in Israel.

== See also ==
- The Dinah Project
- UN Office of the Special Representative on Sexual Violence in Conflict
- Nova music festival massacre
- Silent Cry, Association of Rape Crisis Centers in Israel
- Sexual and gender-based violence in the October 7 attacks
- Sexual and gender-based violence against Palestinians during the Gaza war
