= Bearing Witness to the October 7th Massacre =

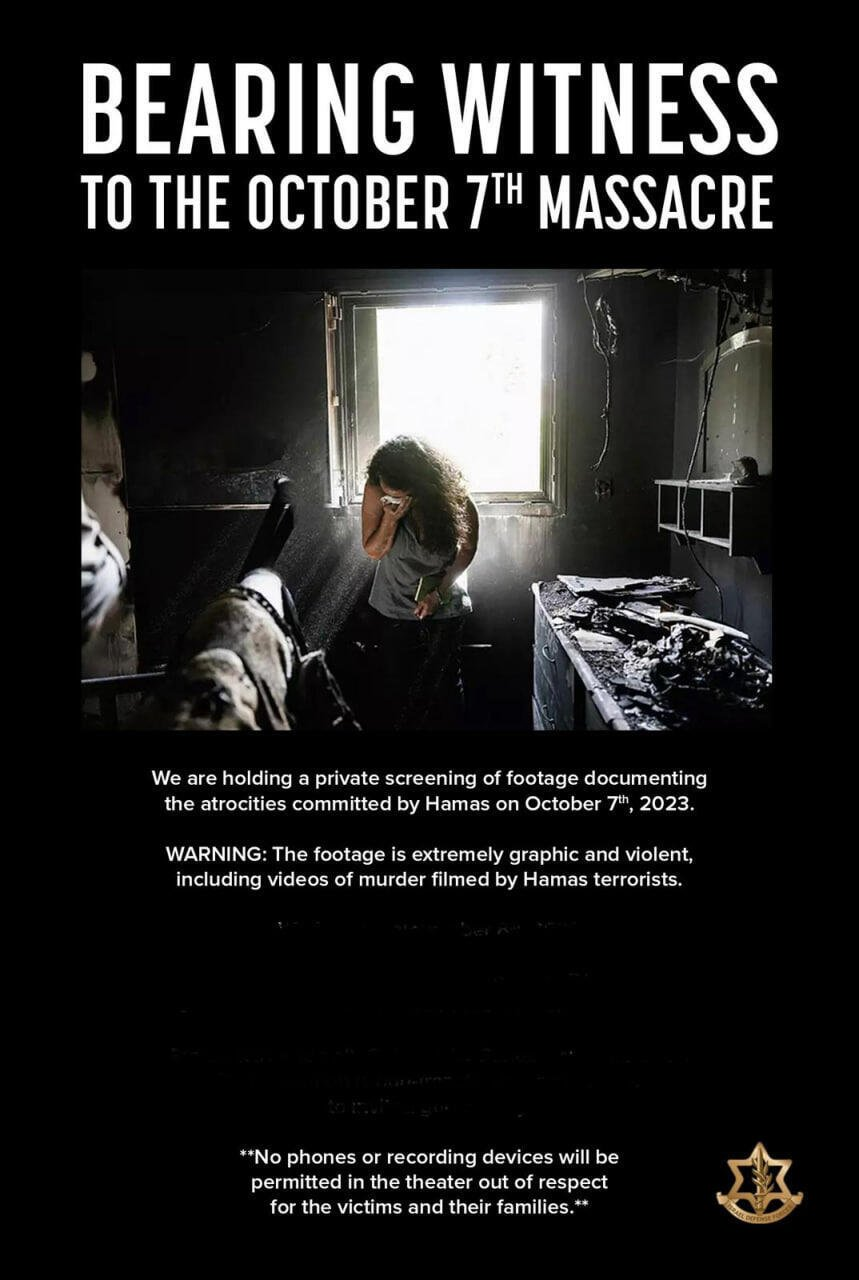
- Produced by: IDF Spokesperson's Unit
- Edited by: Mattan Harel-Fisch and Yuval Horovitz
- Release date: 2023 (private screenings only)
- Running time: 47 minutes
- Country: Israel

Bearing Witness to the October 7th Massacre (also unofficially titled סרט הזוועות, lit. 'the atrocity film' or 'the film of horrors' in Hebrew) is an Israeli documentary film, a compilation by the IDF Spokesperson's Unit of raw footage from the October 7 attacks. The film includes footage captured from body cameras worn by Hamas-led Palestinian militants on 7 October 2023, and contains scenes of violence recorded during and after the attacks.

Israeli officials have held screenings of the film for national and international journalists, foreign diplomats, and Hollywood executives to garner support and to deflect criticism of Israel's conduct during the war in Gaza. The film has generated controversy, with some criticizing plans to publicly release the footage over concerns it would be psychologically harmful.

== Background ==
A series of coordinated attacks, conducted by the Palestinian Islamist militant group (Note: Hamas has been designated as a terrorist group by Australia, Canada, the European Union, Israel, Japan, Paraguay, the United Kingdom, and the United States) Hamas, from the Gaza Strip onto bordering areas in Israel, commenced on 7 October 2023, initiating the Gaza war. Hamas and other Palestinian armed groups named the attacks "Operation Al-Aqsa Flood", while they are referred to in Israel as "Black Saturday" (Hebrew: השבת השחורה) or the "Simchat Torah Massacre" (Hebrew: הטבח בשמחת תורה).

The attacks began in the early morning with a rocket barrage of at least 3,000 rockets launched against Israel and vehicle-transported and powered paraglider incursions into its territory. Palestinian militants breached the Gaza–Israel barrier, targeting civilians for killing in neighboring Israeli communities and attacking military bases. In a single day, about 796 Israeli civilians and 379 Israeli soldiers and police were killed in nearby towns, kibbutzim, military bases and at a music festival near Re'im. 251 Israeli civilians and soldiers were taken as hostages to the Gaza Strip, including an estimated 30 children.

At least 44 nations have condemned Hamas, labelling the attacks as terrorism. The day was described by media outlets and politicians as the bloodiest in Israel's history and "the deadliest for Jews since the Holocaust" by US president Joe Biden.

== Content ==
CCTV footage of Hamas members killing a man and attacking other people in Mefalsim on 7 October. Many images and videos of the attack were spread on social networks which are similar to those in Bearing Witness.

The 47-minute video was produced by the IDF Spokesperson's Unit from footage retrieved partly from the body cameras of Hamas militants who carried out the 7 October attacks on Israel. The video shows images of the attack, including scenes of murder, and mutilation of the bodies of Israeli civilians and some foreign workers. The footage contains graphic content such as burned bodies, including a burnt baby, civilians shot in homes, cars and public spaces, the beheading of a body, bodies thrown in dumpsters, soldiers killed at military bases, and female hostages being pulled by the hair while being kidnapped. Other footage was taken on mobile phones by civilians as they tried to escape, and by first responders after the attack.

Some militants wore fatigues to resemble Israeli army uniforms or were dressed like police. Militants carried radios and zip ties to subdue and transport captives.

The militants, according to the footage, moved through towns for hours without security forces present. In footage taken by civilians, the attackers are seen suddenly emerging at a music festival, sending panicked revelers fleeing across fields amidst cries and moans of the injured. At one military base, militants killed desk staff before seizing their assault rifles.

In one segment, security camera footage shows Hamas militants killing a man using a grenade. Following this act, the militants are seen retrieving beverages from a refrigerator while the man's children are screaming and crying.

In another scene, young female soldiers are seen huddled as a militant entered and began firing. The assailants are seen stopping vehicles to drag out and execute occupants, and stealing cell phones and belongings from the dead and dying. Civilians reportedly in shock were filmed being pulled by their hair into militant trucks bound for Gaza.

The militants also reportedly videotaped themselves pulling a dead soldier's body from a car which young men stomped on. A young woman was filmed being hauled from a car trunk and driven off while surrounded by a crowd.

== Screenings ==
Israeli officials held private screenings of the graphic footage for influential audiences, requiring agreements to not publish or share any footage from the film and prohibiting recording devices. After the film was shown to members of the Knesset in Israel, the content deeply disturbed some attendees. Screenings have been held for Israeli Knesset members as well as foreign journalists and diplomats in Israel and at Israeli consulates worldwide.

Screenings for Hollywood figures was also arranged by Israeli-American filmmaker Guy Nattiv and Israeli actress Gal Gadot, taking place in Los Angeles and New York.

Forty members of the U.S. Senate, from both political parties, attended a screening of the film in the U.S. Capitol on 29 November 2023. As they exited, most attendees, who were visibly affected by what they saw, said nothing to reporters outside.

Almost 200 people, including Harvard College Dean Rakesh Khurana and hedge fund billionaire Bill Ackman, attended a screening of the film at Harvard University on 4 December. The screening, organized by Harvard Chabad rabbi Hirschy Zarchi, was the first screening at a university campus.

After facing controversy stemming from the 2023 United States Congress hearing on antisemitism, MIT President Sally Kornbluth, MIT Corporation Chairman Mark Gorenberg and 40 others attended a 19 December screening hosted by the Chabad House of MIT. According to Kornbluth, she faced pressure from some faculty and members of the school administration to cancel the screening. Kornbluth was to-date the highest-ranking official in American academia to attend a screening.

On 17 May 2024, a private screening was to be held by sales agent WestEnd Films for a small group of Hollywood figures attending the Cannes Film Festival. The invitation to the screening featured a warning about the graphic footage and stated that participants would receive the location of the screening only a few days prior for security reasons. However, an hour before the screening at the venue (later revealed to be the Exclusive Hotel Belle Plage), attendees were informed that the screening had been called off. The co-founders of WestEnd Films stated this was done after receiving an order from the Israel Defence Forces, citing a security threat, although they were not given additional details about it.

== Controversy ==
Within Israel, there was debate around publicly releasing the graphic footage. Proponents, such as Prime Minister Benjamin Netanyahu, argued the brutal images would rally international backing for Israel's cause by offering incontrovertible evidence of Hamas' atrocities; they contend that it is vital for the world to witness these horrific crimes firsthand. However, mental health experts raised concerns about further traumatizing a population still reeling from the attacks and warned that the film's impact would quickly fade from the news cycle.

Screenings of the film in Los Angeles were protected by local police.

== See also ==
- Israeli public diplomacy in the Gaza war
- Screams Before Silence
- Sexual and gender-based violence in the October 7 attacks
- War crimes in the Gaza war
