= Screams Before Silence =

Documentary about Hamas use of sexual violence against Israel

- Promotional poster
- Hebrew: זעקות ואז שתיקה
- Directed by: Anat Stalinsky
- Cinematography: Shahar Reznik; Nir Maman
- Edited by: Tal Hake; Shimon Spektor; Nadav Tamir
- Music by: Roy Nassee
- Release date: April 26, 2024 (YouTube)
- Country: Israel
- Language: Hebrew

Screams Before Silence is a documentary film led by American businesswoman Sheryl Sandberg that explores the sexual violence perperated by Hamas members during the October 7 attacks, including events at the Nova music festival massacre and abductions of hostages into the Gaza Strip. The film was released on YouTube on 26 April 2024. In 2024, it was nominated in Israel for an Ophir Award for Best Short Documentary.

== Production ==
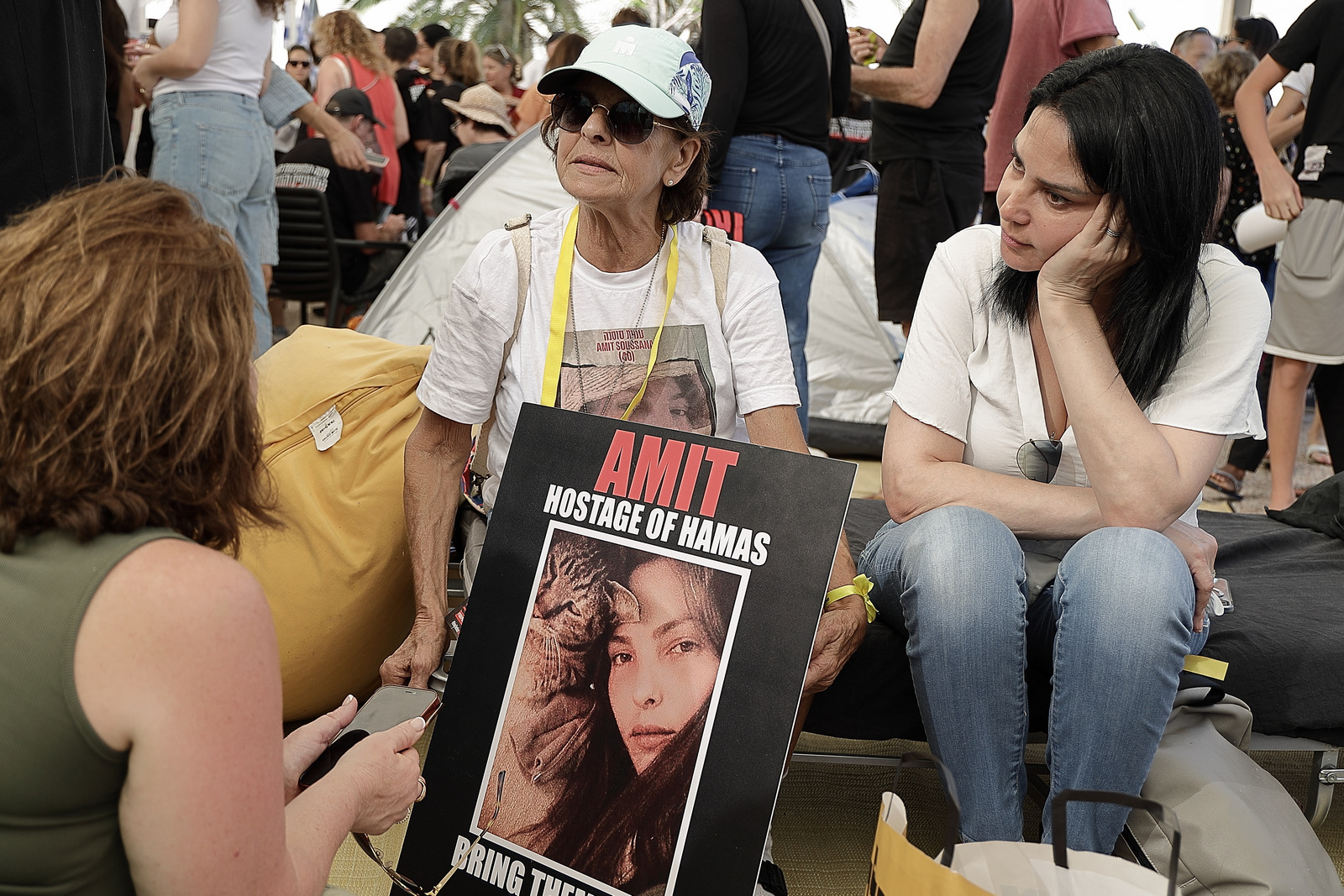
Amit Soussana's mother waiting for her return

The film was directed by Anat Stalinsky with cinematographer Sasha Gavrikov and led by Sheryl Sandberg. Shooting took place in February 2024. One of the participants in the film is Amit Soussana who was abducted to Gaza and freed in the hostage release deal in November 2023. She described the sexual assault she experienced while being held by Hamas. Additionally, the film includes testimonies by members of ZAKA and other witnesses about rape and sexual assaults during the massacre at the Nova Festival and in other places in Israel where the attack took place. Sandberg has described the film as the most important work of her life.

=== Release ===
On 5 May 2024, the film was aired in Israel on various channels, including HOT, yes, Cellcom and Partner. The film was screened in the U.S. capitol for American lawmakers and at the White House.

== Reception ==
Bret Stephens wrote about the film in The New York Times, noting its powerful impact: "To watch Screams Before Silence is to be disabused of any lingering doubts about what Hamas did. The personal testimonies of victims, survivors and witnesses are clear and overpowering, as is the photographic evidence Sandberg was shown of mutilated corpses. And some of them have scarcely been heard about outside Israel."

Briahna Joy Gray criticized the film, saying that it relies on "debunked" reporting such as the New York Times' "Screams Without Words" article. Ryan Grim criticized the film's reliance on coerced interrogation videos and cast doubt on the evidence and conclusions in the documentary. TheWrap film critic Elizabeth Weitzman called the film hard to watch and that it needed a trigger warning, but praised the "immensely powerful job" done by the director in telling the story of October 7.

In June 2024, Donald Trump urged people to see the film, writing on social media that it is "...incredibly difficult to watch because, sadly, it graphically portrays the Death and Destruction that Hamas has unleashed."

In August 2024, the film was nominated for Best Short Documentary at Israel's Ophir Awards.

== See also ==
- Bearing Witness
