= The Civil Commission =

Israel non-profit organization

The Civil Commission (formally: The Civil Commission on October 7th Crimes by Hamas Against Women, Children and Families) is an Israeli non-profit organization founded in late 2023. It collects, researches and archives material relating to the Hamas-led attacks of October 7, 2023, and the subsequent period of hostage captivity, with a particular focus on sexual and gender-based violence. The organization was founded by Cochav Elkayam-Levy, a legal scholar and human rights researcher.

== History ==
=== Background ===
The Civil Commission was founded by Cochav Elkayam-Levy, Merav Israeli-Amarant, and Nirit Samocha in the weeks following the October 7 attacks on Israel. According to the organization, its establishment was a response to what its founders characterized as an absence of immediate engagement by international institutions on the subject of sexual violence and other crimes against women and children committed during the attacks. Elkayam-Levy is a lecturer in international relations at Hebrew University and an expert specializing in international law, gender and human rights. After serving in the IDF spokesperson unit, she studied law at Bar-Ilan University. While a doctoral student at the University of Pennsylvania, she published a paper providing legal guidance for force feeding prisoners on hunger strike. She and her uncle Yaakov Bardugo are allies of Prime Minister Benjamin Netanyahu. According to The Times, Elkayam-Levy is "the most prominent public voice on the sexual violence of October 7."

=== Early work ===
In October 2023, Elkayam-Levy and other researchers submitted a letter to UN Women and, on October 20, 2023, submitted a preliminary legal report to the United Nations. That report was updated on November 1, 2023. In the weeks after the October 7 attacks, the Commission began creating an archive of videos, photographs, and other materials documenting allegations of violence against women and children on October 7. The commission also collected testimonies of survivors, ZAKA emergency responders, and confessions of Palestinian militants interrogated by the Israeli military. Based on the evidence gathered, the Commission concluded that Hamas systematically committed widespread sexual violence on October 7. Elkayam-Levy told Haaretz: "The torture of women was weaponized in the destruction of communities, in sowing general horror and in breaking the spirit of the Israelis."

In the beginning, the commission consisted of 15 volunteers, including legal scholar Yifat Biton. Legal scholar Ruth Halperin-Kaddari was initially involved in the Commission but later left due to her concerns about Elkayam-Levy's methodology. According to Halperin-Kaddari, Elkayam-Levy spread misinformation about the October 7 attacks, including photographs of slain female Kurdish soldiers she misidentified as Israelis. Additionally, Elkayam-Levy repeated false claims made by ZAKA about a fetus cut out of a pregnant woman. In response to allegations of spreading misinformation, a spokesman for the Commission referred to the challenges of working in wartime conditions and stated that Elkayam-Levy stopped talking about the story after finding out it was untrue.

In March 2024, Elkayam-Levy was awarded the Israel Prize for her work with the Civil Commission. The award announcement mentioned that she wrote a report about Hamas atrocities. Channel 13 journalist Raviv Drucker published an article alleging that Elkayam-Levy had not in fact published a report on the subject but only a brief letter. The Ministry of Education stated that Elkayam-Levy received the award for her work to raise awareness and not for writing a report. Elkayam-Levy stated that a comprehensive report documenting the crimes committed by Palestinian militants was in progress. Around the same time, a Ynet article cited a government official stating that the Civil Commission consists solely of Elkayam-Levy and that she had solicited millions of dollars in donations. Additionally the government official characterized her work as unreliable.

=== 2026 Civil Commission report ===
In May 2026, the Civil Commission published Silenced No More documenting sexual and gender-based violence during the October 7th attacks and against hostages held by the Palestinian militants including Hamas.

The report contained more than 10 thousand photographs and video snippets with more than 1,800 hours of visuals and more than 430 witness testimonies and interviews with survivors, released hostages, experts and family members of the victims.

The report called the sexual and gender-based violence “systematic, widespread, and integral” to the October 7th attacks and its aftermath. The report pointed out thirteen repeated abuse patters, which included rape, gang rape, sexual torture, mutilation, forced nudity, executions linked to sexual violence and abuse in captivity. The commission concluded that these weren’t merely isolated incidents but their systematic and repeated abuse behaviour points to a broader method of terror and humiliation.

French newspaper, Le Monde, called the report the most comprehensive investigation so far into sexual violence perpetrated during the October 7th attacks. It noted the commission’s effort to recount events site by site, at the same time mentioning the evidentiary difficulties given the scale of the attack, destruction and burning of bodies, limited collection of forensic evidence and the overall chaotic nature of the attack.

The Civil Commission called the documented acts as war crimes, crimes against humanity, torture, persecution, terrorism-linked sexual and gender-based violence, and genocidal acts as per the international law. The conclusion that the report reached further add to the earlier findings by the United Nations, Human Rights Watch, Amnesty International, the Association of Rape Crisi Centres in Israel and the Dinah Project.

== Activities ==
The Commission maintains a digital archive that, according to the organization, contains testimonies, photographs, videos, and other materials related to the October 7 attacks and subsequent hostage captivity. The organization states the archive is intended for use in legal proceedings, academic research, and historical record-keeping.

The Commission has submitted legal analyses and reports to governmental and international bodies. Submissions have been directed to entities in Israel, the United States, and forums associated with the United Nations.
