= Hirschy Zarchi =

American campus rabbi

Hirschy Zarchi is an American rabbi and shaliach for the Chabad Hasidic Jewish movement. Since 1997, he has been the founder and head of the Chabad house at Harvard University, one of the largest Chabad campus operations in the United States. He is also Jewish chaplain for students and alumni of Harvard.

== Biography ==
Zarchi was born in Crown Heights, Brooklyn in 1973. Zarchi graduated from Oholei Torah and Rabbinical College of America yeshivas and received rabbinical ordination from Central Lubavitch Yeshiva in 1994.

Zarchi was dispatched as a shaliach for the Chabad Hasidic Jewish movement to Boston in the 1990s. Initially, he was based in Harvard Square, encouraging Jewish men to put on tefillin. In 1997, he married Elkie, and later that year they established a Chabad house at Harvard University. Rabbi Zarchi became a recognized campus chaplain in 2003. The Harvard Chabad dedicated a new building in 2003.

In 2006, Zarchi organized a 650-student Shabbat dinner in Annenberg Hall, the largest Shabbat dinner in the history of Harvard. The dinner was attended by the then-president of Harvard Larry Summers, who noted Harvard's legacy of discriminatory Jewish quotas. Later on, Harvard Chabad began to annually host SHABBAT1000, a Shabbat dinner on campus for over 1,000 people- including students, faculty, alumni, and others. As rabbi, Zarchi has become friends with Jewish students at Harvard, including Jared Kushner and Josh Kushner.

Zarchi's position was endowed with a $5 million donation in 2022. The donation would supplement the Chabad house's $9 million annual budget, one of the largest campus Chabad operations in the United States. EJewish Philanthropy described the Harvard chabad as a "citywide Jewish empire" with four Chabad center for students, four preschools, and a Jewish day school.

In the aftermath of the 2023 Hamas attack on Israel, Zarchi and special friend Bill Ackman organized a showing of Bearing Witness, which showed scenes of extreme violence recorded during and after the incursion, on the Harvard campus, to approximately 150 Harvard affiliate and members of the Cambridge community. The showing was the first campus audience to view the film. While Judaism generally discourages the viewing of murder, Zarchi stated that there was an exception if "it will have the effect of preserving life."

During a Hanukkah menorah lighting at Widener Library in 2023, Zarchi criticized Harvard's stance on antisemitism and described "an atmosphere of fear for Jewish students" while speaking in front of Harvard president Claudine Gay. Zarchi revealed that Harvard does not allow Chabad to keep the menorah displayed overnight due to fears of vandalism, which was cited by judge D.J. Stearns in a judicial opinion in one of the antisemitism lawsuits against Harvard. Gay was broadly criticized during the 2023 United States Congress hearings on antisemitism, for not doing enough to condemn and combat antisemitism on Harvard's campus. He has advocated for Harvard "to de-recognize the Harvard Undergraduate Palestine Solidarity Committee."

== Honors ==
In 2024, the Jerusalem Post named Zarchi to its "50 Most Influential Jews" list alongside Ammiel Hirsch, Ephraim Mirvis, and Yuda Drizin for "spiritual guidance in trying times".

== See also ==
- Chabad on Campus International Foundation
