= The Dinah Project =

Israeli human rights organization

- Founded: 2023; 3 years ago
- Founder: Ruth Halperin-Kaddari
- Headquarters: Jerusalem, Israel
- Website: thedinahproject.org/

The Dinah Project (Hebrew: פרויקט דינה) was founded to obtain recognition and justice for victims of sexual violence in war, emphasizing the victims of sexual and gender-based violence during the October 7 attacks. It is named after Dinah, the daughter of Jacob, who was a victim of sexual violence, and operates at the Ruth and Emanuel Rackman Center for the Advancement of Women at Bar-Ilan University.

in 2025 it received the Transparency Shield Award awarded by Transparency International Israel, part of Transparency International. The award is granted annually to individuals and/ or organizations who promote promoting transparency and social responsibility.

== Leadership ==
The Dinah Project came into being in the aftermath of the October 7 attacks. It was founded by legal scholar and women's rights advocate Professor Ruth Halperin-Kaddari, who heads the Rackman Center for the Advancement of the Status of Women at the Faculty of Law at Bar-Ilan University, former chief military prosecutor of the Israel Defense Forces Sharon Zagagi-Pinhas, and Israeli lawyer and judge Nava Ben-Or.

Its Advisory Board includes Dorit Beinish, Majed El Shafie, Gal Gadot, Carol Gilligan, Gadeer Mhree, Dahlia Lithwick, Deborah Lyons, Raheel Raza, Amit Soussana, and Noa Tishby.

== Activities ==
=== A Quest for Justice ===
The Dinah Project published A Quest for Justice: October 7 and Beyond in July 2025. The report "establishes that Hamas used sexual violence as a tactical weapon, as part of a genocidal scheme and with the goal of terrorizing and dehumanizing Israeli society." It documented "widespread and systematic" sexual violence committed by Hamas at the Nova music festival, Route 232, the Nahal Oz military base, and the kibbutzim Re'im, Nir Oz, and Kfar Aza. The report was structured to indicate legal strategies and tools for pursuing justice for victims of sexual violence in warfare.

The report includes evidence and testimony from fifteen freed hostages, only one of whom had previously spoken publicly of her experiences, and noted that most of the victims had been "permanently silenced," either murdered or too traumatized to testify. It also drew from reports of seventeen witnesses of the attacks and trauma counselors working with survivors. Reports include testimonies of being beaten and sexually assaulted at gunpoint, and being chained by an iron ankle chain for three weeks. The report states that many of the former hostages were threatened with rape and forced marriage, and sexual harassment including unwanted touching of private parts.

Documented evidence included "bodies found with foreign objects inserted into the genitals; bodies bearing signs of genital mutilation; and bodies – mostly of women – discovered at various sites either fully or partially undressed from the waist down, with hands bound and gunshot wounds, often to the head or genitals." Victims were found "with their hands tied behind their backs and/or to structures such as trees and poles, and shot."

It corroborated 2024 findings by the United Nations that Hamas had committed rape and "sexualized torture" during its assault. UN Special Representative on Sexual Violence in Conflict, Pramila Patten, and her team visited in late January 2024 and found " that there are reasonable grounds to believe that conflict-related sexual violence occurred in multiple locations during the 7 October attacks, including rape and gang-rape in at least three locations, namely: the Nova music festival site and its surroundings, Road 232, and Kibbutz Re’im. In most of these incidents, victims first subjected to rape were then killed, and at least two incidents relate to the rape of women’s corpses." The mission team also found evidence similar to those cited in the report of victims found naked, bound and shot, with indications of torture and other cruel treatment.

The report called upon the United Nations to list Hamas as an organization that employs "sexual violence as a weapon of war."

==== Reactions ====
An Israeli government official described the report as "a significant public diplomacy tool for us".

An analysis of the report by Drop Site News concluded that it "contains scant new evidence and largely aggregates existing reports, many of which have been discredited or called into question. Instead of marshaling new evidence, it argues that less should be needed: The report spends the bulk of its 80 pages presenting a legal argument for a lower evidentiary standard to prosecute Hamas for war crimes over the alleged systematic use of sexual violence as a weapon of war." Novara Media said of the report, "Though presented as an academic paper, the report has an inflammatory tone, describing 'those terrorists who participated in the attack on October 7' as 'a violent horde that lacks any moral restraint'." They also reported in March 2026 that the report had received £90,000 in funding from the UK government.

Reem Alsalem, the United Nations Special Rapporteur on violence against women and girls, responded to the publication of A Quest for Justice with a statement saying, "It is my understanding that neither the [U.N. special commission appointed to investigate the October 7 attacks] nor any other independent human rights mechanism established that sexual or gender-based violence was committed against Israelis on or since the 7th of October as a systematic tool of war or as a tool of genocide."

Le Monde stated the report’s conclusions were presented as broadly consistent with earlier findings and documentation efforts by the United Nations Office of the Special Representative of the Secretary-General on Sexual Violence in Conflict (OSRSG-SVC), the Association of Rape Crisis Centers in Israel and Silenced No More by the Civil Commission, investigating conflict-related sexual violence connected to the attacks.

=== Other activities of the Dinah Project ===
Halperin-Kaddari, Zagagi-Pinhas, Ben-Or, and other representatives of The Dinah Project have discussed the October 7 attacks and sexual violence in media appearances.

In Newsweek in 2024, project member Ayelet Razin Bet Or contradicted the claims of musician Roger Waters that Hamas had committed no rape or sexual violence in the October 7 attacks.

==== Legal and current ====
The Dinah Project seeks justice for the victims of conflict related sexual violence (CRSV) on 7 October 2023 and against hostages who were held hostage. It is lobbying the Israeli government to prosecute the terrorists arrested in conjunction with the sexual violence perpetrated.

In addition it is working to help current and future victims of CRSV worldwide through:

- Advocating for the adoption of their legal thesis of collective and joint responsibility to prosecute CRSV in Israel and on the international stage.
- Attempting to introduce revisions in international criminal law.

== See also ==
- Sexual and gender-based violence in the October 7 attacks
- Silenced No More
