= Sharon Zagagi-Pinhas =

Israeli attorney

Sharon Zagagi-Pinhas (Hebrew: שרון זגגי־פנחס) is an Israeli attorney specializing in military and administrative law. She is a former Chief Military Prosecutor for the Israel Defense Forces.

== Education ==
Zagagi-Pinhas graduated from the Israeli National Security College with a Bachelor of Arts in political science. She later earned LLB and LLM degrees at the institution. She graduated with her LLM cum laude.

== Career ==
As Chief Military Prosecutor for the IDF, Zagagi-Pinhas pursued high profile cases, including the criminal probe into the 2015 shooting death of Samah Abdallah, the 2016 manslaughter case against Sergeant Elor Azaria, and the 2017 conviction of Brigadier General Ofek Buchris for sexual offenses.

After retiring from military service, Zagagi-Pinhas advocated for Kim Ariel Arad, who was sexually assaulted by her psychologist in 2021, and for the family of Gadi Isaacs, who committed suicide after military police detention in 2022. She has assisted with legal inquiries concerning victims of the October 7 attacks.

Zagagi-Pinhas has appeared in the media as a legal expert, commenting on investigations into Sde Teiman for The Jerusalem Post and Haaretz, and sexual violence in the 7 October attacks for Der Standard.

Zagagi-Pinhas is a founding member of The Dinah Project and expert member of the Dvorah Forum. She is one of the authors of A Quest for Justice: 7 October and Beyond, published by The Dinah Project in 2025.

She works on the legal team of the law offices of Nahmany-Bar in Herzliya Pituah. As a reservist, she holds the rank of Colonel.
