= Cochav Elkayam-Levy =

Israeli legal scholar and human rights advocate

- Born: 1984 (age 41–42); Lod, Israel
- Education: Bar-Ilan University (BA); University of Pennsylvania Carey Law School (MA, SJD)
- Occupations: Legal scholar, human rights advocate
- Employer(s): Hebrew University of Jerusalem; Reichman University; Shalom Hartman Institute
- Known for: Founding the Civil Commission on October 7th Crimes by Hamas against Women and Children; Israel Prize (2024)

Cochav Elkayam-Levy (Hebrew: כוכב אלקיים-לוי) is an Israeli legal scholar and human rights advocate specializing in international law and gender equality. She is best known for founding the Civil Commission on October 7th Crimes by Hamas against Women and Children following the Hamas attack on Israel on October 7, 2023, and for receiving the Israel Prize in 2024, Israel's highest civilian honor.

== Career ==
Elkayam-Levy holds a doctorate from the University of Pennsylvania Carey Law School and is a Sophie Davis Post-Doctoral Fellow in the Leonard Davis Institute Program on Gender, Conflict Resolution and Peace at the Hebrew University of Jerusalem. She also teaches at Reichman University and serves as a Senior Fellow at the Shalom Hartman Institute in Jerusalem.

Prior to October 7, Elkayam-Levy was the principal author of Israel's National Report on Gender Mainstreaming in Times of Emergencies, which was adopted by the Israeli government in June 2022. She was also a prominent figure in the 2023 Israeli protest movement against the government's proposed judicial reforms, where she represented women's rights organizations.

Elkayam-Levy founded the Devorah Institute for Gender and Sustainability Studies at the University of Pennsylvania, a research institute focused on gender equality and sustainable development.

== Civil Commission on October 7th Crimes ==
Following the Hamas-led attack on Israel on October 7, 2023, Elkayam-Levy founded the Civil Commission on October 7th Crimes by Hamas against Women and Children, an independent nonprofit organization dedicated to documenting, researching, and raising international awareness of war crimes and gender-based violence committed during the attack and in captivity. Elyakam-Levy stated that she was driven to create the report in the wake of silence and opposition from former allies when she came to address the United Nations after the attacks and as part of an effort to create an independent effort to document how "Hamas itself had uploaded and distributed large quantities of material to cause as much psychological damage as possible."

The Commission developed a war crimes archive to collect, preserve, and analyze evidence, and led an international campaign for recognition of gender-based violence committed on and after October 7.

Shortly after the attacks, Elkayam-Levy met with senior White House staff on gender policy, resulting in what the Commission described as a historic statement of recognition and support for victims of October 7. She addressed the United Nations Human Rights Council and served as an honorary guest of the French delegation at the 2024 Commission on the Status of Women.

Elkayam-Levy co-authored a report introducing the legal concept of "Kinocide," defined as the weaponization of families as a tactic of war, coined alongside former Canadian Minister of Justice Irwin Cotler.

== Recognition ==
In 2024, Elkayam-Levy received the Israel Prize in the field of Solidarity (Arvut Hadadit), Israel's highest civilian honor, for her work raising awareness of the crimes committed against Israeli women, children, and families on and after October 7. The award committee noted that her commitment had "propelled her to take action both nationally and internationally."

She also received the Peres Center for Peace and Innovation Medal of Distinction and the Jane Evans "Pursuit of Justice" Award, the highest honor bestowed by the Union for Reform Judaism.

Elkayam-Levy was a member of the ROI Community, the Schusterman Family Philanthropies' global network of young Jewish innovators, which she joined as a law student.

== See also ==
- Civil Commission on October 7th Crimes by Hamas against Women and Children
- 2023 Hamas-led attack on Israel
- Israel Prize
- ROI Community
