= Association of Rape Crisis Centers in Israel =

Israeli umbrella organization of rape crisis centers

ARCCI
- Association of Rape Crisis Centers in Israel
- Hebrew: איגוד מרכזי הסיוע לנפגעות ונפגעי תקיפה מינית בישראל
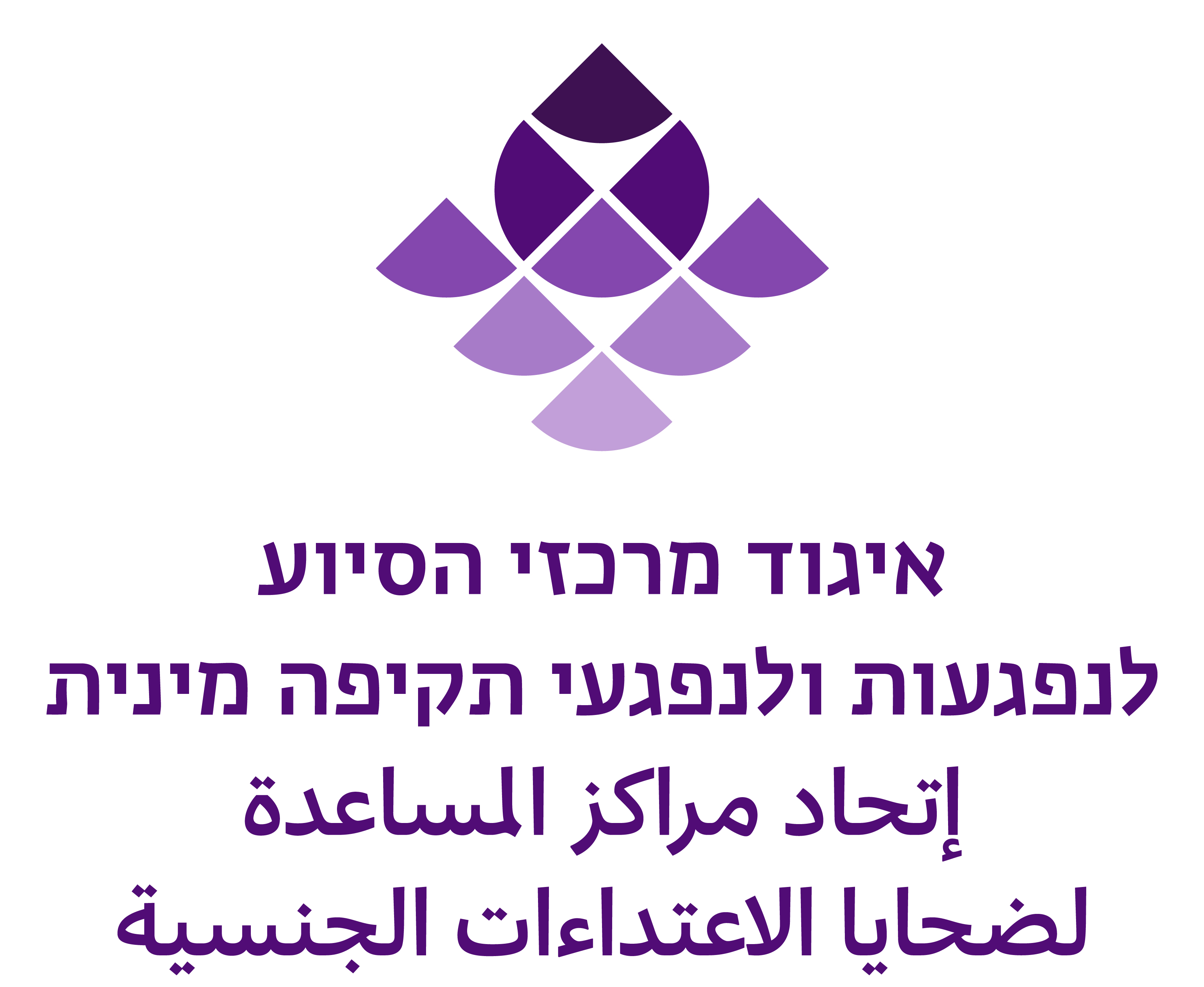
- Headquarters: Jerusalem, 9153102
- Website: 1202.org.il

The Association of Rape Crisis Centers in Israel (ARCCI) is the umbrella organization of the nine rape crisis centers operating throughout Israel. The rape crisis centers provide assistance, counseling and support to victims and victims of sexual violence, and operate the assistance lines 1202 (for women), 1203 (for men) and Kolmila, which works via chat and WhatsApp.

The ARCCI works to promote policies on a variety of issues related to the rights of victims and victims and to eradicate the phenomenon of sexual abuse in Israel.

== Services ==
The aid centers operate a wide range of services for sexually abused women and men and their relatives, and handle more than 50,000 inquiries every year. In addition, the aid centers operate education, prevention and intervention programs within the local community, with the idea that the best way to deal with sexual abuse is to prevent it from happening in advance.

The centers' helplines are included in Israel's national emergency centers, and calls to them are free of charge.

The assistance centers for victims and victims of sexual assault provide a wide range of services to women and men who have been sexually assaulted and to their immediate environment, including:

- Immediate assistance system via emergency phones lines (24/7), chat and WhatsApp
- Legal support
- Specialized support groups
- Referral to appropriate treatment and rehabilitation programs
- Assistance in obtaining due compensation from National Insurance

=== Advocacy work ===
ARCCI works to promote rights and services for victims and victims of sexual assault on a systemic level, which complements the individual work carried out in the regional centers. These include:

- Policy promotion : initiative and promotion of amendments to legislation and regulations for victims of sexual assault, participation in Knesset committees, work with the government and government ministries.
- Law : submitting petitions to the High Court and participating in legal proceedings in principled cases, for the purpose of designing legislation
- Law enforcement: training for key positions in the law enforcement system (police, prosecutors, courts) and joint work with them to improve the treatment of victims of sexual offenses
- Public committees: participation in public committees and professional forums dealing with issues and policies related to the treatment of sexual violence in Israel
- Research and building a body of knowledge: conducting studies, collecting systematic data on the phenomenon of sexual assault in Israel and publishing professional articles
- Communication : Shaping the public and media discourse on sexual violence and accompanying victims and victims who wish to go to the media
- Development of tools and methods to prevent harm and sexual harassment
- Coordination of national projects of the individual rape crisis centers
- Activism and protests

== History ==
The Association of Assistance Centers for Victims and Victims of Sexual Assault was founded in 1990 as an umbrella organization, uniting nine local assistance centers under it.

The first assistance center for victims and victims of sexual assault in Israel was established in Tel Aviv in 1977 by the feminist movement, following the suicide of a student at Tel Aviv University, a mother of a child, who in April 1976 returned home from a day of study and was raped in the area of the fields surrounding the university during the lunch hour. After contacting the police, she was interrogated for hours and then sent to the Babu Kabir Pathology Institute for a physical examination. In the suicide letter, the woman stated that she was raped twice: once by the attacker and once by the police. Like many other victims of sexual assault at the time, she had nowhere to turn . Therefore, it was decided to establish a center that will provide a listening ear and support to every victim based on the principle - "You are not alone", in the hope that referrals to the center will break the cycle of silence, loneliness and shame that characterize the feelings of many victims. The center was established by female volunteers and within a few years additional centers were established in Jerusalem, Haifa, Beer Sheva and Herzliya . In those years, funding for the activity came from the New Israel Fund and donations from private individuals.

In 1988 Maslan - an aid center for victims and victims of sexual assault and violence in the Negev was established by Liza Nikolaychuk, a psychologist who immigrated to Israel from Kyiv, Ukraine. Maslan was the first center to operate a Russian-language helpline. On August 9, 2010, Maslan received the President's Volunteer Medal awarded by the President of Israel. This is a prestigious award given once a year, to exceptional volunteers in Israeli society.

In January 1996, the statute of limitations for committing sexual offenses within the family was extended. According to the amendment to the penal law, victims of sexual offenses may sue the perpetrator until they reach the age of 28, provided that no more than ten years have passed since the last offense was committed. In 2003, the rape crisis centers managed to bring about an additional extension of the statute of limitations, which allows the victims to complain to the police until they reach the age of 38.

In 2004, a help line for religious and ultra-Orthodox men who were victims of sexual assault was established in Jerusalem, after the center in Tel Aviv found out that about 25% of the men contacting the help line are religious or ultra-Orthodox, and it was necessary to recruit religious or ultra-Orthodox volunteers, with the idea that contacting a religious person would make it easier for the victim.

In the wake of the October 7 attacks and reports of rapes and other sexual violence by Hamas at several locations, the Association collected information from witnesses and survivors and issued a report "Silent Cry", which concluded that found that violent sexual abuse was not "incidental" but an intentional operational strategy and took place in at least 4 locations: the Nova Festival Massacre, Kibbutzim, IDF army bases and among hostages held in Gaza.

The report was presented to the Knesset and to the United Nations. It was published in 6 languages, English, French, Arabic, Italian, Spanish and German.

Later reports including the Dinah Project, the United Nations Office of the Special Representative of the Secretary-General on Sexual Violence in Conflict (OSRSG-SVC) and Silenced No More issued by the Civil Commission in May 2026.

== See also ==
- Silent Cry
