= Amit Soussana =

Israeli former hostage (born 1983)

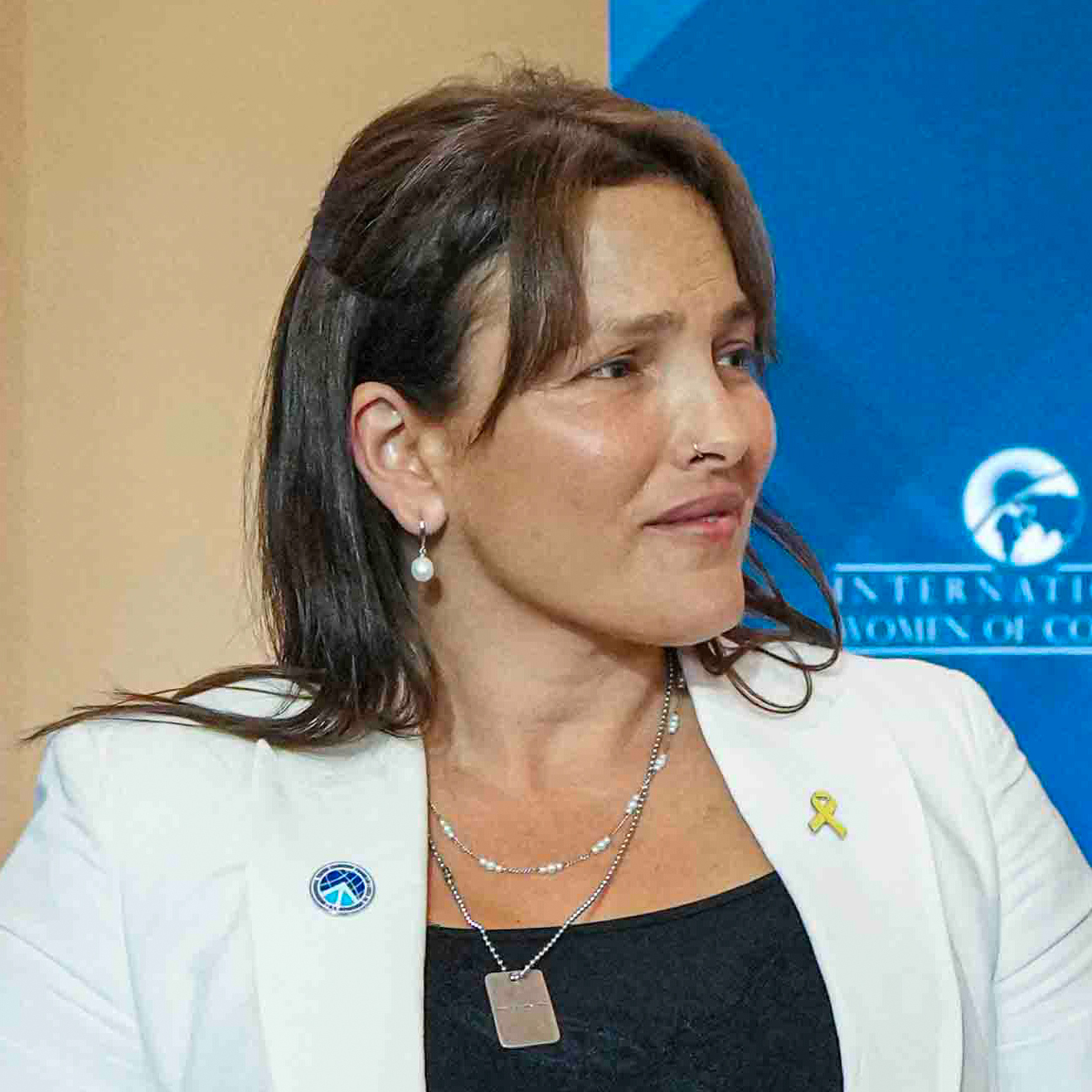
- Soussana in April 2025
- Born: 9 September 1983 (age 42); Israel

Amit Soussana (born September 9, 1983) is an Israeli lawyer who was abducted and taken hostage by Hamas during the Kfar Aza massacre in the larger October 7 attacks. She was released on November 20, 2023, amidst the beginning of the Gaza war. She was the first Israeli hostage to come forward about being sexually assaulted in captivity.

== Early life ==
Amit Soussana was born on September 9, 1983. She was raised in Sderot and had two older sisters, Shira and Liat. She obtained an LLB from Sapir College. She has been a licensed member of the Israeli Bar Association since 2014. She was employed by Luzzatto & Luzzatto, Attorneys and Patent Attorneys from 2015 to 2024. She lived by herself in a one-story house in Kibbutz Kfar Aza.

== Abduction and captivity ==
On October 7, 2023, Soussana was abducted from her home in Kibbutz Kfar Aza. Footage of her abduction showed her trying to resist against a group of her abductors. She was injured during her abduction, and upon her release was found to have several facial fractures along with bruising on her knee and back. During her captivity, she was held in around six locations, including homes, offices, and a tunnel 40 meters below the ground. She was originally held alone in a home near the Gaza border, where she was kept chained by the ankle. Around the start of the Israeli invasion of the Gaza Strip, Soussana was moved to a different home in Nuseirat, where she was held with four other hostages. In that location, she was bound and beaten during an interrogation by her captors, until fellow hostage Liri Albag convinced their captors that Soussanna was not in the IDF. In mid-November, Soussana and six other hostages were moved to a tunnel. Later, the three hostages were moved to another home. She was freed on November 30, 2023, during the prisoner exchange between Hamas and Israel, after spending 55 days in captivity.

=== Sexual assault ===
In an interview with The New York Times, Soussana described being forced to commit a sexual act on her captor while being held at gunpoint. Early on in her captivity, Soussana was held in a child's bedroom, and occasionally "the guard would enter, sit beside her on the bed, lift her shirt and touch her." Around October 24, 2023, Soussana was sexually assaulted by a guard using the alias of 'Muhammad'. During the interview, Soussana said that 'Muhammad' pointed his gun at her, groped her, and eventually forced Soussana "to commit a sexual act on him".

== Post-release activities ==
The day after her release, Soussana recounted her sexual assault to a doctor from Israel's National Center of Forensic Medicine.

In January 2024, Soussana met with Pramila Patten, the United Nations Special Representative on Sexual Violence in Conflict. In a March 2024 interview with the New York Times, Soussana became the first released Israeli hostage speak publicly about being sexually assaulted in captivity. Since then, Soussana has testified about her sexual assault in many public instances. She was interviewed in the documentary Screams Before Silence by Sheryl Sandberg. On June 17, 2024, Soussana met with U.S. vice president Kamala Harris at the White House at a screening of Screams Before Silence. On October 23, 2024, Soussana testified about her sexual assault in front of the United Nations Security Council. Soussana was a member of the advisory board for The Dinah Project. In March 2025, Soussana was presented with the International Women of Courage Award by the United States Department of State due to her advocacy.
