= Confessions of detained Palestinians in the Gaza war =

During the Gaza war, the Israel Defense Forces released videos of detained Palestinians in which they confessed to committing various crimes. Israel has used these videos to promote its narrative of the war. Many news sources and human rights organizations say these confessions were extracted under torture. Some Palestinians who were later released confirmed they were forced to make such confessions.

During the Gaza war, Israel detained thousands of Palestinians; these included: those captured during the October 7 attacks, Palestinians on work permits inside Israel, and those captured from the Gaza invasion and West Bank incursions. The detained Palestinians have been tortured and 36 of them have died in custody. In October 2023, Israel's domestic security agency, Shin Bet, and the IDF's Unit 504, began releasing summaries and videos of what they said were "Hamas militants". Shin Bet officers said that during their interrogations, Palestinians confessed to murdering and raping Israelis and mutilating dead Israeli bodies during the October 7 attacks, and that many Palestinians further confessed to killing women, children and even infants. Shin Bet spokesperson Shalom Ben Hanan said the results of these interrogations were meant for Western audiences, to promote Israel's narrative. In November, during Al-Shifa Hospital siege, Israel released confessions of Palestinians claiming Hamas was using the hospital for military purposes.

Immediately after the initial videos were released, news sources began questioning whether the confessions were extracted under duress. They noted, for example, the Palestinians in the videos had bruises on their faces, and blood on their clothes. Palestinians later released confirmed they were beaten by Israeli interrogators to make statements. UNRWA staff who were later released said they were coerced (through beating and waterboarding) to confess ties to Hamas. Some Israeli officials criticized Shin Bet for releasing the Palestinians. In August 2024, B'Tselem released a report detailing widespread and systemic torture of Palestinian detainees, and that these detainees reported being beaten during interrogations. Other sources also stated that during interrogations, Palestinian men, women and children in Gaza and in locations such as the Sde Teiman detention camp detention camp have been subjected to rape, gang-rape, sexualized torture and mutilation among other forms of sexual violence, as well as psychological and physical torture by both male and female Israeli soldiers and medical staff.

Human Rights Watch, Amnesty International and Physicians for Human Rights Israel have denounced such taped alleged confessions, stating that they were likely extracted under torture, violate international law and basic human rights, and should be considered inadmissible as credible evidence. They also called on the Israeli government to cease publishing taped "confessions".

== Background ==
Hamas, a Palestinian Islamist group that has governed the Gaza Strip since 2006, has been engaged in a prolonged conflict with Israel. Israel, the United States, and the European Union, among others, regard Hamas as a terrorist organization. On October 7, 2023, a significant surprise attack by Hamas on southern Israel marked a major escalation in the ongoing Israel–Hamas conflict. According to Israel Defense Forces (IDF), an estimated 3,000 Hamas-led gunmen entered Israel during the invasion. The attack was characterized by its scale and intensity, as the militants allegedly targeted both Israeli civilians and military bases, resulting in the deaths of around 1,200 people in Israel (according to Israel, mostly non-combatants), and the capture of approximately 245 military captives and civilian hostages of varying ages, who were transported into the Gaza Strip. The IDF reportedly detained 600 militants in Israel following the Hamas attack.

== Forced confessions and torture reports ==
Numerous Palestinian detainees have reported torture during interrogations by Israeli forces, which has raised significant alarm among international human rights groups such as Amnesty International. One detainee told Amnesty that Israeli interrogators beat him severely, resulting in three broken ribs, and ordered Palestinian detainees to "praise Israel and curse Hamas". Reports by Amnesty, B'Tselem, Human Rights Watch and various media outlets have confirmed that during interrogations and in detainment Palestinian men, women and children in Gaza and in locations such as the Sde Teiman detention camp detention camp have been subjected to rape, gang-rape, sexualized torture and mutilation among other forms of sexual violence, as well as psychological and physical torture by both male and female Israeli soldiers and medical staff.

Dr. Shai Gortler, who studies incarceration and torture, stated that Shin Bet allows media exposure "to put forward its own narrative about its actions, torture included", among other reasons.

On October 25, the Associated Press analyzed six interrogation videos released by Israeli security services, and stated that they could not independently verify them, and that the alleged militants, who are bloodied and wincing in pain, could have been speaking under duress. Likewise, on October 29, an article in Global News said some of the claimed confession videos of alleged Hamas militants could have been produced under duress. On November 14, AP News analyzed that a claimed confession video Israel released showed the captured militant was speaking "clearly under duress".

On November 19, NBC News, which analyzed the alleged confessions of alleged militants, stated "it is unclear whether they were speaking under duress". Shin Bet officials denied torturing militants, but Public Committee Against Torture in Israel contends the Shin Bet uses extreme heat and cold, sleep deprivation and stress positions during interrogations. NBC News noted that in one of the confession videos, the militant had blood on his shirt and bruises on his face, which Israel explained came from capture in combat.

On November 26, the Physicians for Human Rights Israel denounced taped alleged confessions released by the Israeli military (IDF), intelligence (Shin Bet) and government, citing "severe concern that the interrogations included the use of torture."

On November 30, one Palestinian (accused by Israel of being a militant) was released as part of the prisoner exchange, and said he was repeatedly asked by Israeli soldiers to make confessions with "a gun to his face".

On December 13, The New York Times reported that Israel had interrogated medical personnel in Gaza under duress. Gaza’s Ministry of Health similarly stated that Israeli interrogations of hospital staff were conducted "under duress".

On March 29, 2024, Human Rights Watch and Amnesty International denounced taped alleged confessions released by the Israeli military (IDF), intelligence (Shin Bet) and government, stating that they were likely extracted under torture, violate international law and basic human rights, and should be considered inadmissible as credible evidence. They also called on the Israeli government to cease publishing taped "confessions".

On April 23, Haaretz reported that United Nations staff were tortured and forced to confess to terrorism offenses.

The Shin Bet said they have conducted interrogations under strict legal frameworks, aiming to gather confessions and intelligence for immediate and future use. The interrogation settings, as reported, were intense, with the suspects often bound and held in improvised facilities. They cited a 1999 Israeli Supreme Court ruling that prohibited torture except for a "ticking bomb" scenario.

In March 2026, Al Jazeera Arabic and The New Arab reported that an 18-month-old Palestinian boy named Karim Abu Nassar was tortured by Israeli forces in the Gaza Strip by using extinguished cigarettes and forced metal nails into the child's skin after the IDF detained his father, Osama, in order to extract a false confession from him.

== Interrogation of detainees captured in Israel ==
Interrogations of detainees captured in Israel following the October 7 attack, revealed, according to the IDF, that Hamas commanders had sanctioned targeting civilians, including children, women, and the elderly. The IDF characterized these statements as evidence pointing to a premeditated and organized plan by Hamas to inflict maximum civilian casualties.

=== Alleged accounts of the events and the mindset of attackers ===
Interrogations of the detainees, conducted primarily by Shin Bet and IDF's Unit 504, have provided, according to Israeli defense sources, a detailed account of the events and the mindset of the attackers. One of the captured attackers, an alleged member of Hamas's elite Nukhba commando unit, provided a description of the Kfar Aza massacre, saying that the primary mission of his group was to kill civilians rather than taking hostages. The interrogation sessions were held over four weeks, mainly in a southern Israeli prison, and concluded in early November.

During the interrogation, according to the videos released by the IDF Spokesperson unit, the detainee recounted how his group entered Kfar Aza in a jeep, blew up the gate with an explosive device, and then proceeded to attack the residents with firearms and grenades. He described entering homes and shooting at a safe room where children were crying, until no more noise was heard. The detainee acknowledged that such actions were not permitted by Muslim teachings, which do not allow the deliberate killing of children. When asked about the difference between Hamas and the Islamic State terror group, he said that in the videos he had been shown by interrogators, the actions of Hamas were comparable to those of ISIS.

In another video released by the IDF, a detainee said that a reward of $10,000 and an apartment would be given as a reward for bringing hostages back to Gaza.

=== Alleged military use of tunnels and medical facilities ===
In additional interrogation footage released by the Israeli military, another detainee alleged to be a member of the Nukhba says that the military tunnels used by Hamas pass under neighborhoods and are hidden under hospitals, including al-Shifa hospital. He says these sites are exploited because of the knowledge that Israel would avoid targeting them, making them safe locations for storing explosives, weapons, and other materials. Moreover, the alleged militant claims Hamas was hoarding fuel supplies, prioritizing their machinery and vehicles over distributing them to the Gazan population. Another alleged militant claimed that Hamas uses ambulances to transport weapons and operatives across the Gaza Strip.

== Interrogation of detainees captured in Gaza ==
During the Gaza war, the IDF has conducted extensive ground operations in the Gaza Strip, which they state have targeted strongholds of Hamas. During these operations, the military has reported the arrest of hundreds of additional individuals suspected of involvement with what they characterized as terrorism. These arrests have taken place across several areas described by Israeli authorities as Hamas strongholds, including Shejaiya and Jabaliya refugee camp in northern Gaza, as well as Khan Younis in the south.

The Israeli army intelligence unit has collaborated with Shin Bet, Israel's internal security service, to arrest an additional 150 suspects, including known Hamas operatives from the Jabaliya area. Some suspects were interrogated in real-time by Unit 504 inside Gaza, with the IDF confirming the operation of an interrogation facility within the Gaza Strip.

=== Interrogation of alleged militants captured at al-Shifa Hospital ===
The IDF's penetration into the underground tunnel network surrounding al-Shifa hospital revealed a stockpile of weapons and led, according to Israel, to the interrogation of a captured and wounded Hamas militant on the hospital grounds by Unit 504 and Shin Bet interrogators. Orders had been given to keep some alleged Hamas members alive for intelligence purposes, emphasizing the critical nature of the information they could provide.

The interrogation of two alleged Hamas operatives, which was performed on the hospital grounds by Unit 504 and Shin Bet, was claimed to have provided further details about the Hamas operation. According to videos of the interrogation released by IDF, the operatives claimed to have to captured foreign workers in Israel and using ambulances to transport them to Shifa Hospital.

== Public and media interaction ==
A significant aspect of these interrogations was the production and release of videos for public and media consumption. These videos were intended to showcase the "legitimacy" of Israeli military actions and to counter the narratives from Hamas. The materials released were truncated and did not show the complete interrogation process. However, they played a crucial role in the information war between Israel and Hamas, providing what Israel characterizes insights into the militant group's tactics and ideologies.

Shalom Ben Hanan, a veteran intelligence officer who participated in the interrogations, described the approach taken by Shin Bet. According to him, the agency's methods included both traditional interrogation techniques and efforts to psychologically engage with the suspects. The overarching goals of these interrogations were to extract confessions, gather future-use intelligence, and produce videos for international and domestic information dissemination. The interrogations involved a vetting process, selecting high-impact detainees from over 600 arrested individuals for more focused questioning.

== See also ==
- Mass detentions in the 2023 Israel–Hamas war

== Works cited ==
- Josef, Federman (14 November 2023). "Is Hamas hiding in Gaza's main hospital? Israel's claim is now a focal point in a dayslong stalemate". AP.
- "Thousands break into U.N. aid warehouses in Gaza as Israel presses ground offensive - National | Globalnews.ca". Global News.
- Shear, Michael D. (13 December 2023). "After Meeting Biden, Hostage Families Express Confidence in U.S. Efforts". The New York Times.
- "Israel/OPT: Horrifying cases of torture and degrading treatment of Palestinian detainees amid spike in arbitrary arrests". Amnesty International. 8 November 2023.
- Mehul Srivastava (30 November 2023). "The Palestinian teenagers suddenly freed from jail in Hamas hostage deal". The Financial Times.
- "'Raped by female soldiers': Palestinian in leaked Sde Teiman photo speaks out". Middle East Eye.
- "Palestinian in leaked Sde Teiman photo speaks out". Middle East Eye. 10 August 2024. Archived from the original on 11 August 2024.
- "Palestinians recount deadly abuse in Israeli prisons: 'It is Guantánamo'". The Washington Post. 29 July 2024.
- "Welcome to Hell" (PDF). B'Tselem.
