= Mass detentions in the Gaza war =

Arrest and detention of Palestinians since October 2023

- Part of the Gaza war, the Israeli–Palestinian conflict, and the Gaza genocide (Note: per Amnesty International: "Amnesty International found that the following pattern of conduct indicated genocidal intent: ... the torture and incommunicado detention of Palestinians from Gaza .... Acts prohibited under the Genocide Convention took place alongside other violations of international law that indicate genocidal intent, such as the incommunicado detention, torture, and other ill-treatment of Palestinians from Gaza.")
- Mass detention of Palestinians in the Gaza Strip by Israeli soldiers, December 7
- Date: October 7, 2023–present (2 years, 10 months and 3 days)
- Location: Israel, Israeli-occupied Palestinian territories
- Methods: Arrests, administrative detentions, disappearances
- Status: Ongoing

Parties
Gazan Palestinians	West Bank Palestinians	Arab Israelis

Number
Workers in Israel: 4,000–5,000 (Note: of whom 3,200 were released on November 3) Inside Gaza: 3,120 (Note: as of 23 February, according to Euro-Mediterranean Human Rights Monitor)	9,021 (Note: as of 10 June 2024, per Palestinian Prisoner’s Society)	270 (Note: as of November 30, per Adalah)

Casualties
- Death: At least 98 (Note: as of November 17, 2025, per Physicians for Human Rights—Israel. PHRI notes: "the real toll is likely substantially higher because hundreds of people detained in Gaza are missing".)

Since the outbreak of the Gaza war on October 7, 2023, Israel has carried out mass arrests and detentions of Palestinians. Thousands have been arrested in the Israeli-occupied Palestinian territories and in Israel, based on alleged militant activity, offensive social media postings, or arbitrarily.

News outlets and human rights organizations both within and outside of Israel reported that thousands of Gazan workers in Israel were detained in the weeks following October 7. Additionally, Israel has detained or enforced disappearance of residents of the Gaza Strip, arrested Palestinians in the West Bank and Arab citizens of Israel, and detained fighters captured inside Israel. Concerns have been raised regarding the legality, secrecy, and conditions of many detentions, including allegations of widespread mistreatment, torture, and sexual assault.

On 3 November 2023, Israel deported 3,200 Gazan Palestinian workers who were detained in Israel following the October 7 attacks to the Gaza Strip. In addition to Palestinian prisoners in custody prior to the outbreak of the war, an unknown number of individuals remain in detention. Those arrested or detained include journalists, politicians and political activists, artists, medics and physicians, temporary workers, and other civilians, including women and children. As of April, 2025, nearly 10,000 prisoners were held in Israeli custody. Prisoners' organizations in Palestine report that approximately 18,000 Palestinians were arrested in the West Bank between October 7, 2023 and August, 2025.

Images of a mass arrest by Israeli soldiers in Gaza circulated widely during the war, showing men and boys with no known organizational affiliations stripped to their underwear, tied up, and blindfolded. After the images began to circulate, Israeli authorities and media described the scene as the surrender of 150 suspected Hamas militants in Khan Younis. Analysts questioned the authenticity of the purported surrender, suggesting that it may have been staged by Israeli forces. Security officials later acknowledged that the scene was not a mass surrender of Hamas militants. Human rights groups have expressed concern about the images and the detentions.

== Background ==
=== Incarceration of Palestinians by Israel ===
Since 1967, one million Palestinians have been arrested by Israel. In July 2023, the United Nations Human Rights Office reported that 5,000 Palestinians (including 160 minors) were incarcerated in Israeli jails and prisons. Some have been convicted of crimes by Israeli authorities; the United Nations Special Rapporteur on the occupied Palestinian territories describes many convictions as resulting from "a litany of violations of international law, including due process violations, that taint the legitimacy of the administration of justice by the occupying power." As of August 2023, 1,200 Palestinians were held without any charges or trial, in a practice referred to as "administrative detention"; Israel justifies the practice on the basis of security. The administrative detention of at least 105 Palestinians was based on an Israeli law known as the "unlawful combatants law", which excludes the detained from prisoner of war status under article four of the Third Geneva Convention.

=== Outbreak of war on October 7 ===
Hamas, which has governed the Gaza Strip since 2007, has been engaged in a prolonged conflict with Israel. On October 7, 2023, a significant surprise attack by Hamas on southern Israel marked a major escalation in the ongoing Israeli-Palestinian conflict. The IDF estimated that approximately 3,000 Hamas-led militants entered Israel during the invasion. The invasion was characterized by its scale and intensity, as the militants allegedly targeted both military bases and Israeli civilians, resulting in the deaths of an estimated 1,200 people in Israel (according to Israel, mostly non-combatants) and the capture of over 200 military captives and civilian hostages of varying ages.

According to Israeli sources, more than 600 militants who participated in the attack were detained in Israel.

=== Revocation of work permits ===
Prior to the outbreak of the war, approximately 19,000 Gazan men over the age of 25 were permitted to work in Israel, predominantly in the agricultural and construction sectors. The measure was intended to provide economic opportunities, with the aim of alleviating widespread poverty in the Gaza Strip.

On October 10, the Coordinator of Government Activities in the Territories (COGAT), a department of Israel's government responsible for administering the work permit program, revoked all work permits previously issued to Gaza residents and stated that "they will not be reinstated". The Israeli government's press office said: "There will be no more Palestinian workers from Gaza. Those workers from Gaza who were in Israel on the day of the outbreak of the war will be returned to Gaza." The suspension of work permits stripped these individuals of their legal status, rendering them "illegal aliens" under Israeli law.

== Mass arrests, disappearances, and detentions ==
Israel has arrested over three thousand Palestinians from the West Bank since October 7 2023, and widely imposed administrative detention orders on them, according to local rights groups. According to the Palestinian Commission for Detainees and Ex-Prisoners' Affairs, the number of Palestinians in Israeli prisons had doubled from 5,200 prisoners before October 7 to more than 10,000 prisoners and detainees as of October 24. As of November 23, the Commission placed the number at 8,300, including 3,000 individuals held in administrative detention. While the IDF stated on December 4 that 2,150 Palestinians had been arrested in the West Bank since the outbreak of the war, it reported 3,450 arrests in the West Bank as of December 6. According to HaMoked, an Israeli NGO, 2,873 Palestinians were held in administrative detention as of December 6, an all-time high.

On December 10, The Washington Post stated a pattern had emerged in which men and boys were detained by the Israeli military and then never heard from again. On December 16, the OHCHR stated it had received "numerous disturbing reports from the north of Gaza of mass detentions, ill-treatment and enforced disappearances of possibly thousands of Palestinians," including children. By 16 January 2024, the Palestinian Prisoners Society reported there were a total of 8,800 Palestinians in Israeli prisons.

In July of 2024, there were 21,000 prisoners in Israeli jails, outreaching the maximum capacity of the system by some 6,500. The figure did not include about 2,500 Gazans, who were mostly held in military detention facilities. Shin Bet director Ronen Bar warned that the facilities had become a "ticking time bomb": "The physical and mental living conditions may lead to acts of violence inside the jails and prisons, and some inmates are already planning acts of violence and revenge," Bar said in a letter to Netanyahu.

=== Palestinian workers from Gaza ===
On October 23, The Independent reported that "Palestinians with permission to work in Israel were rounded up, arrested and blindfolded before being taken to military camps" following the outbreak of hostilities. According to Dr. Nasri Abu Jaish, Minister of Labour for the Palestinian Authority, 4,500 workers were unaccounted for, but believed to have been detained by Israeli forces, as of that date; the International Labour Organization estimated the number of missing workers at between 4,000 and 5,000. Jacobin and Muhammad Aruri, head of legal affairs for the General Union of Palestinian Workers, placed the number of detainees among this group at 4,000.

COGAT confirmed the detention of an unspecified number of Gazans, but declined to comment on the reasons for the arrests or conditions of detention. Amnesty International confirmed that thousands of Gazan workers were detained incommunicado for at least three weeks at two military detention centres in Israel. While several thousand were released, Amnesty stated that "there is no transparency from Israeli authorities" regarding the number of Gazans still in detention. By May 2024, 1,000 workers were reported as still missing.

=== Palestinians within Gaza ===
Time reported on November 20, 2023 that the total number of Gazans who have been detained by Israeli forces in recent weeks remained unclear. Haaretz reported on January 3, 2024 that 661 Gazan Palestinians were detained in Israeli jails, representing a 150% increase from the previous month; this number does not include Gazans detained at military facilities.

On November 19, 200 Palestinian men from Gaza were detained by Israel Defense Forces while attempting to evacuate with their families in a southerly direction within the Gaza Strip. The detentions came to light due to the detention of Mosab Abu Toha among the men. The Israeli military detained the men at a checkpoint as they attempted to leave the north of Gaza for the south.

According to the head of the Palestinian Prisoners' Association, 153 women have been arrested in Gaza since the outbreak of the war, including pregnant women and women detained with their babies. The Ministry of Detainees and Ex-Detainees Affairs stated women from Gaza had been subjected to torture and abuse. On December 25, footage emerged showing hundreds of detained men and boys stripped to their underwear and held in a stadium.

On 1 February 2024, Haaretz reported that Israel had detained an 82-year-old grandmother with Alzheimers for two months as an "unlawful combatant" and only released her after an appeal. On 6 February, dozens were arrested in Gaza City, including children. On 9 February, the Council on American-Islamic Relations demanded the release of two U.S. citizen brothers detained in Gaza, leading National Security Council spokesman John Kirby to state the US would speak to Israel.

==== Healthcare workers ====
On 15 November 2023, reports emerged alleging detentions by Israeli forces at Al-Shifa Hospital in Gaza. Doctors who spoke to Al Jazeera Arabic, one of the few international outlets able to access sources within the hospital, stated that the detainees were blindfolded and stripped naked. Mondoweiss cited Al Jazeera reports that "Israeli forces took captive dozens of displaced people, relatives of patients and the injured", and that the detainees were transferred to undisclosed locations. China Daily, a Chinese state-run media outlet, reported on similar statements by the hospital's director, Mohammed Abu Salmiya, who referred to "dozens" of detentions at the hospital. On 23 November, Abu Salmiya was himself arrested by Israeli forces, along with other medics. As of 4 December 2023, the fate of Abu Salmiya remained unknown; Israeli authorities declined to answer questions by The Jerusalem Post, but "hinted" that he remained in Shin Bet custody. He had not been charged with an offence.

On 30 November 2023, the Palestine Red Crescent Society stated that the whereabouts of the head of Khan Younis Emergency Medical Center had been unknown for nine days, following his arrest by Israeli authorities. On December 3, the Gaza Health Ministry stated that 34 medics in Gaza had been detained by Israel. On 12 December 2023, the World Health Organization reported on the mass detentions of medical staff. Adnan al-Bursh, the head of orthopedics at al-Shifa was arrested with two nurses. On December 13, the British-organization Medical Aid for Palestinians stated 70 medics at the Kamal Adwan Hospital had been detained by the IDF. On December 19, the Gaza Health Ministry stated that Israel was holding 93 healthcare workers "in inhumane conditions, under interrogation [and] under torture, starvation and extreme cold." On 28 January 2024, the head of head of orthopedic surgery at Nasser Hospital was arrested.

One paramedic arrested in Jabalia stated he and his colleagues were beaten in their sensitive areas, heads, and backs, and had rocks thrown at them. A group of ten healthcare workers described being tortured in detention. A doctor arrested while working at Ahli Arab Hospital in December 2023 described being shackled and blindfolded. On 5 February 2024, the general manager and administrative director of al-Amal Hospital were arrested. On 6 February, two medical volunteers were arrested while evacuating from the al-Amal Hospital. Several medical workers were arrested at al-Amal on 9 February. Eight more al-Amal hospital were arrested on 10 February. On 19 February, the Red Crescent stated that twelve of its medics were continuing to be detained two weeks after Israel's raid on Al-Amal Hospital. Citing the Health Ministry, UNOCHA reported on 20 February that 70 medical personnel had been arrested following the Nasser Hospital siege.

On 3 March 2024, the Palestinian Red Crescent stated 14 of its staff members were detained, with their status or whereabouts unknown. One staff member was released on 17 March after spending 36 days in detention. Seven more staff were released on 28 March after being held for 47 days. In September 2024, a Palestinian Medical Relief Society paramedic stated that during his arrest, he was stripped naked, zip-tied, blindfolded, and that Israeli soldiers put an assault rifle against his head, doused him in gasoline, and threatened to set him on fire.

On 3 May 2024, it was announced that Dr. Adnan Al-Bursh had died on 19 April 2024 while in Israeli captivity. Further details on his cause of death have not yet been given, but dozens of fellow detainees attest to the systematic torture of the doctor, and say it led to his death. In October 2024, staff at the Kamal Adwan Hospital stated that more than 30 medical personnel had been detained by the Israeli army during a raid, including the hospital's head of nursing, an employee of the American medical organization MedGlobal.

==== December 7 mass detention ====
On December 7, widely-circulated video and images showed dozens of Palestinian men and boys in Northern Gaza blindfolded, stripped partially naked, and kneeling on the ground, guarded by Israeli soldiers. Soon after the images began to surface on social media, Israeli authorities and Israeli media (initially without citing any source) described the mass arrest as the surrender of 150 Hamas militants by the Israeli Defence Forces and Shin Bet. However, analysis of the video by Al Jazeera's verification unit concluded that the purported "surrender" had been staged, noting discrepancies between different "takes" of the footage. BBC Verify also suggested the scene "performed for the camera, rather than as an act of authentic surrender". It pointed out that the detainees had already been stripped of their clothes, were held at gunpoint, and were given directions from soldiers off-camera, and that it was unclear if they were surrendering weapons or merely moving them around at the instructions of IDF. The BBC further noted that it is unclear whether the individuals depicted have any involvement with Hamas or the October 7 attack. Finally, the BBC opined that Benjamin Netanyahu is keen to portray the IDF as defeating Hamas. The IDF did not directly respond to the BBC's questions about the circumstances surrounding the footage. Hamas denied allegations that dozens of its members had surrendered, referring to these reports as "false and baseless". Haaretz reported that approximately 10-15% of the men were affiliated with armed groups according to security officials, who stated that this was "not a mass surrender of entire units of Hamas".

Several of the detainees are civilians with no known affiliation with any armed group, including a journalist. In a statement on December 7, the Euro-Mediterranean Human Rights Monitor (a Geneva-based NGO) referred to "reports that Israeli forces launched random and arbitrary arrest campaigns against displaced people, including doctors, academics, journalists, and elderly men" sheltering in UNRWA schools. IDF spokesperson Rear Admiral Daniel Hagari stated: "We arrest everyone" for interrogation. Al Jazeera reported on December 8 that some of the detained men had been released. However The New York Times reported that, according to family members and local rights groups, some of the men had not been seen since their detention.

According to relatives, two of the detainees were 13- and 72-years-old respectively, and thus not of fighting age.

A former legal adviser to the U.S. State Department described the treatment of the detainees as seemingly inconsistent with international law, and referred to Israel's presumption that military-aged men are fighters as "troubling". The International Committee of the Red Cross expressed concern about the images, emphasizing "the importance of treating all those detained with humanity and dignity" under international law. Muhammed Shehada, communications chief at Euro-Mediterranean Human Rights Monitor, told Al Jazeera that the images and videos could only have been taken by Israeli soldiers or media embedded with them, as no Palestinian photographers remain in the area. A spokesperson for the U.S. State Department called the images "disturbing."

Men and boys released on December 9 reported the IDF had beaten them, given them only minimal water, prevented them from using the toilet, and forced them to sleep on raw rice. One fourteen-year-old boy stated he was stripped and beaten, and that female Israeli soldiers had spat on him and the other detainees.

Al-Araby Al-Jadeed reporter Diaa al-Kahlout, who was arrested during the 7 December mass arrest, was released on 9 January. Al-Kahlout stated, "We were sitting in a situation of torture".

==== December 10 mass detention ====
The Israeli media outlet Ynet reported on a mass detention which it described as the surrender of dozens of suspected Hamas militants to Israeli forces in Jabaliya on December 10. Following their arrest, the men were stripped naked, blindfolded, handcuffed, and detained.

==== March 6 mass detention ====
On 6 March, Israeli forces operating in Khan Younis stated they had conducted sweeping raids in a residential tower and arrested some 250 people. Israel stated these individuals were "operatives" and that they had additionally seized weapons during the raid.

==== Siege of Jabalia ====
During the Siege of Jabalia, Israel conducted mass arrests of Palestinian men.

=== Palestinians in the West Bank and East Jerusalem ===
The International Committee of the Red Cross expressed "high concern" regarding "the sharp increase in [the] number of arrests" in the occupied West Bank since October 7. Amnesty International has also criticized the "spike in arbitrary arrests" of Palestinians since October 7. Similarly, The Wall Street Journal reported that the rate of arrests in the occupied West Bank has "more than doubled" since that date.

On October 17, Al Jazeera reported that nearly 700 people had been arrested in the West Bank and occupied East Jerusalem since the outbreak of the war. By October 28, this number had climbed to 1,550, according to estimates by the Palestinian Prisoners Society. The Globe and Mail reported that Israel had advised the Palestinian Authority of the existence of 1,700 prisoners, but not their whereabouts, as of October 31. On November 6, Al Jazeera reported that 1,740 individuals had been arrested in overnight raids since the outbreak of the war; BBC reported the total number of arrestees at 2,150, according to the Palestinian Prisoners Society. The Associated Press placed the number at 2,280 on November 8, citing the Palestinian Prisoners Society; on November 10, The Nation reported that the number was "at least 2,200".

By November 8, the number of Palestinians held without charge or trial had increased from 1,319 to 2,070 since October 7, according to HaMoked. On November 15, Mondoweiss reported that arrests in the West Bank continued, with 54 Palestinians arrested the previous night in overnight raids. On November 28, the IDF told The Times of Israel that approximately 2,000 West Bank Palestinians had been arrested, while Palestinian monitoring groups reported 3,290 arrests. On December 3, the Palestinian Prisoners Society reported 3,480 arrests, while the IDF reported 2,150 as of December 4 and 3,450 as of December 6.

Al Jazeera reported that, as of January 10, 2024, nearly 6,000 Palestinians had been arrested in the West Bank since October 7, 2023. An estimated 3,000 were being held under administrative detention.

Detainees arrested in Deir Abu Mash'al, described the experience of being arrested by Israeli forces, stating that soldiers went door to door arresting people, blindfolding them, tying their hands, and taking them to an open building for interrogation. Family members of detainees stated the Israeli army was unjustly arresting and interrogating people.

Two directors and an employee from The Freedom Theatre were arrested by the IDF, with one stating, "They treated us like animals. They are trying to hurt us in anyway they can." One director, Mostafa Sheta, remained in custody and was believed to be held in the Megiddo military prison in northern Israel. The Royal Court Theatre responded to the reports by demanding for the release of the men. On 22 February 2024, a spokesperson for Birzeit University stated that Israeli forces had detained the undergraduate student council president, with more than sixty students arrested since 7 October. In March 2024, verified footage showed Israeli soldiers arresting a group of Palestinians, tying them up with rope, and dragging them. In July 2024, PEN International condemned the detention of the president of PEN Palestine Hanan Awwad in East Jerusalem.

In August 2024, Palestinian families in the West Bank reported hundreds of people were missing, with the Israeli military giving conflicting reports of their condition and whereabouts.

After Palestinian-American teenager Mohammed Ibrahim was abducted from his family's West Bank home and imprisoned at Ofer prison, a coalition of 100 human and civil rights groups petitioned US Secretary of State Marco Rubio to secure his release.

=== Arab Israelis ===
CNN reported that dozens of Palestinian residents and citizens were arrested for "expressions of solidarity" with the civilian population of Gaza, sharing Quran verses, or expressing "any support for the Palestinian people". Haaretz described the widespread targeting of Arab Israelis by Israeli security forces. Rights groups have criticized what they describe as Israel's crackdown on internal dissent. The Israel Police announced that since the beginning of the war, as of October 25, they have detained 110 individuals for allegedly promoting violence and terrorism, primarily through social medial; of these, CNN reported that "only 17 resulted in indictments. Most people were released without further charges, usually after a few days." Abeer Baker, a human rights lawyer representing some of the arrestees, commented that the low number of charges indicated that many of the arrests were for lawful statements. Citing an "emergency coalition" of Israeli lawyers, Al Jazeera placed the number of arrestees at 172 on November 7. Referring to "hundreds" of interrogations, El País reported on November 11 that Israel increasingly treats its Arab minority as a "potential fifth column". As of November 30, 270 Arab Israelis had been arrested, according to Adalah (an Israeli NGO).

== Status of detainees ==
The Guardian and Al Jazeera reported on November 3 that 3,200 Gazan workers had been deported back to Gaza. The fate of other Gaza residents working in Israel remains unknown, as Israeli authorities have declined to respond to questions posed by NGOs. El País reports that 1,000 arrested Gazan workers remained missing as of November 27. Multiple human rights organizations warned that prisoners' rights and conditions of detention had deteriorated drastically in Israeli prisons following the October 7 attack by Hamas. Fast-tracked legislation placed Palestinian detainees under "state of emergency" status, which further restricted their rights.

Human rights organizations in Israel have undertaken efforts to secure the release of Palestinian detainees. On October 22, six organizations (HaMoked, Gisha, the Public Committee Against Torture in Israel, Physicians for Human Rights–Israel, Adalah, and the Association for Civil Rights in Israel) petitioned the High Court for a habeas corpus injunction. The petition asked the High Court to order the disclosure of all names and whereabouts of Gaza residents held in Israeli detention facilities, and the release of any person unlawfully detained. The six groups requested that those released be permitted to remain in the West Bank until they are able to return to Gaza.

According to Adalah, the petitioning organizations stated:

To date [i.e., October 24], the Israeli authorities have refused to provide any information about Gaza workers and other residents of the Strip who are apparently being held in detention centers, why or where they are being detained, under what law and for how long.

Along with the High Court petition, Physicians for Human Rights–Israel reported on October 26 that it had contacted "several [international] bodies", including the International Committee of the Red Cross, urging them to "pressure the IPS [Israel Prison Service] and other Israeli security bodies to adhere to the law" in relation to the rights of detainees.

On November 3, the United Nations Human Rights Office stated that two Palestinians arrested since October 7 had died in Israeli custody. According to Israeli authorities, four Palestinians had died in custody as of November 8. By November 21, the total number of deaths in custody had reached six. According to the United Nations Human Rights Office, this rate of deaths in Israeli custody has not been seen "in decades".

After reaching the 2023 Gaza war ceasefire on November 22, Israel compiled a list of 300 Palestinian prisoners who could be released from custody; Al Jazeera reports that this list only includes individuals arrested prior to October 7. However, the Times of Israel reports that 50 Palestinian prisoners were added to the list on November 27, including 25 Arab-Israelis, "almost all" of whom were arrested since October 7. While 240 Palestinians were released during the seven-day truce, Israel arrested 260 others during the same timespan, according to the Palestinian Prisoners Society.

Israel's arrests included Palestinian-Americans, such as one thirteen-year-old boy held in Ofer Prison who was reportedly pressured by the Israeli army to confess to throwing stones. Palestinian prisoners held under administrative detention can be held for months or even years without ever facing any charges.

=== Allegations of torture and mistreatment ===
==== Allegations by non-governmental and international organizations ====
===== Torture =====
On November 8, Amnesty International reported on cases of torture and degrading treatment by Israeli authorities, which it described as "horrifying", "gruesome", and "a particularly chilling public display of torture and humiliation of Palestinian detainees." In relation to the recent spike in detentions, Amnesty's Secretary General, Agnès Callamard, noted that "arbitrary detention and torture and other ill-treatment are war crimes when committed against protected persons in an occupied territory."

On December 3, the United Nations Human Rights Office in the occupied Palestinian territories called for an investigation into allegations of torture. In a statement, the Office said: "The massive rise in number of Palestinians arrested and detained, the number of reports of ill-treatment and humiliation suffered by those in custody, and the reported failure to adhere to basic due process raise serious questions about Israel's compliance with international humanitarian law and international human rights law." On 19 January, the Human Rights Office stated they had interviewed detainees who "described being beaten, humiliated, subjected to ill-treatment, and to what may amount to torture... consistent with reports our Office has been gathering of the detention of Palestinians on a broad scale." In March 2024, a UNRWA report reported "countless" instances of torture documented in Israeli prisons, including beatings and sexual assault.

The Public Committee Against Torture in Israel (PCATI) stated that there was a "lot of evidence of cases of violence and cruel and humiliating treatment by prison guards", and called for an investigation into the deaths of detainees in Israeli custody. PCATI stated they had documented nine clear instances of torture, including sexual violence. On January 3, 2024, Human Rights Watch reported that Palestinian workers from Gaza detained in Israel since October 7 had been photographed naked, attacked by dogs, and dragged faced down in the gravel. In a report on allegations of torture in Israeli prisons, Euro-Med Monitor stated prisoners were being treated like animals. The Wall Street Journal found detainees underwent psychological and physical abuse, including beatings during interrogations. Doctors reported humiliation, beatings, and being forced to kneel for hours. Adalah reported, "We’re seeing really widespread and systemic use of many, many tools in order to inflict torture and ill-treatment on Palestinians".

A Defence for Children International report included the testimony of an incarcerated child who stated, "Around 18 children were severely beaten, screaming in pain. I saw police dogs attacking them, bleeding from the mouth and head." The United Nations human rights office reported some detainees were released wearing only diapers. Addameer reported that prisoners remained blindfolded and handcuffed during their detention and people were being killed in the military camps. In March 2024, the UN stated that Israel had detained and tortured its employees in Gaza to extract forced confessions.

As part of the Gaza peace plan, Israel returned the bodies of some Palestinian prisoners in October, 2025. The bodies of 135 Palestinians had been mutilated in Israeli custody.

====== UN staff ======
According to February 2024 UNRWA report, Israeli officials detained and tortured UN staff, coercing them into falsely stating that agency staff had participated in the 7 October attack. The allegations of torture came from staff who stated they were forced to make confessions under torture and ill-treatment, including "beatings, sleep deprivation, sexual abuse and threats of sexual violence against both men and women" in Israeli detention. Detainees reported being stripped down to their underwear and forced completely naked. The report found that UN staff were "pressured to make false statements against the Agency, including that the Agency has affiliations with Hamas and that UNRWA staff members took part in the 7 October 2023 atrocities" through beatings, waterboarding, and threats to their families.

In a statement, the UNRWA communications director stated, "When the war comes to an end there needs to be a series of inquiries to look into all violations of human rights". The Israel Defense Forces stated it was investigating "complaints of inappropriate behavior".

In response to the report, the World Organisation Against Torture condemned Israel, stating, "Both torture and the use of any such information violates the UN Convention Against Torture".

===== Due process violations =====
The United Nations Human Rights Office warned that detainees "are reportedly not granted due process and judicial guarantees, as required by international law". OHCHR spokesperson Liz Throssell commented: "We have received credible and consistent reports indicating a further increase in the ill-treatment of detainees, which in many cases could amount to torture." Also on October 29, the ACRI reportedly contacted Israel's Attorney General and Police Commissioner, demanding an end to the practice of publishing "humiliating" images of Arab detainees suspected of "expressing support for terrorism". The appeal criticized infringements of the detainees' rights to "dignity, privacy, and due process", stating that the practice was "designed entirely to degrade and humiliate the detainees."

On 16 January 2024, the Israeli government renewed an emergency order preventing Palestinians detained in Gaza from accessing an attorney. The Defense for Children International stated that one in three juvenile detainees were being held under administrative detention, which it called a "a cruel tool" because "secret charges" could be added to their case without their lawyers knowing.

===== Holding conditions =====
The International Committee of the Red Cross stated that it was "deeply concerned" about its inability to assess the treatment and conditions of detainees, reporting that detainees are unable to access legal counsel or contact relatives. Adalah referred to "testimony [indicating] that the holding conditions in the detention centres are extremely dire."

The Association for Civil Rights in Israel (ACRI) petitioned the Israeli High Court of Justice on October 23, seeking cancellation of the directive allowing Israeli authorities to house "security and criminal detainees on the floor in overcrowded conditions during a state of emergency." On October 29, the ACRI reported the petition had been dismissed by the High Court. The court ruled that considering the legal framework of the amendment, including its temporary nature and the balance mechanisms it establishes, especially under extraordinary national circumstances, there were no grounds for judicial intervention.

Speaking to the ICRC, the Commission for Detainees' Affairs alleged that prisoners and detainees were subject to bans on going outside, confiscation of belongings, reduction in food, torture and beatings, and deprivation of medical attention by Israeli authorities. On 19 January 2024, Ajith Sunghay, a UN human rights official stated, "There are reports of men who are subsequently released but only in diapers without any adequate clothing in this cold weather." The Ministry of Detainees and Ex-Detainees Affairs stated on 25 January that the Negev prison was an "unbearable hell", with a prisoners going without food, water, electricity, or medical treatment. The Ministry of Detainees reported on 6 February that detainees were not provided blankets or warm clothes even as temperatures dropped in the winter. Physicians for Human Rights–Israel reported instances of Israeli medics refusing to treat Palestinian prisoners detained from Gaza. The Ministry of Detainees and Ex-Detainees Affairs reported that conditions in the Etzion detention centre were harsh, including insufficient food or medical care.

In May 2024, the Palestinian Prisoners Society stated that infectious skin diseases, including scabies, were spreading amongst Palestinian prisoners in Israeli jails. In June 2024, National Security Minister Itamar Ben-Gvir stated food reductions for Palestinian prisoners was a "deterrent measure".

==== News reports and allegations by detainees ====
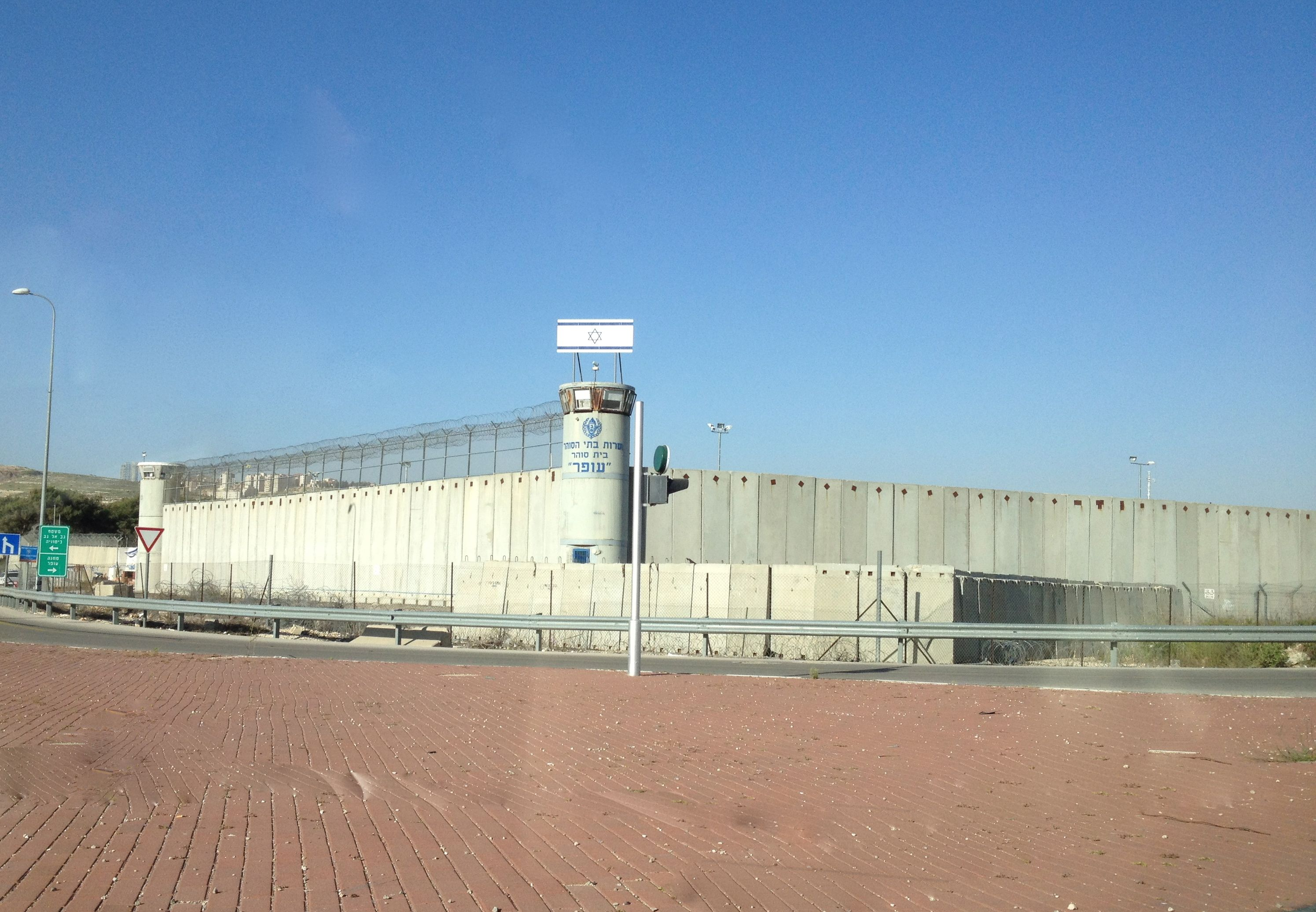
Ofer Prison, where an unknown number of detainees are reportedly incarcerated

NBC News and The Times of Israel reported on several videos depicting Israeli troops (apparently IDF) "abusing bound and blindfolded Palestinian detainees"; the IDF issued a series of statements in response, condemning the abuse as "deplorable" and stating that the incident was under investigation. One video depicts soldiers kicking a bound man, verbally abusing him in Arabic and Hebrew, and spitting on him; another video shows Israeli soldiers brutalizing partially and completely naked Palestinian detainees. As of November 1, one soldier was dismissed from reserve service as a consequence.

Palestinian detainees have stated that they were "subjected to severe abuse and beatings" in Israeli detention, including during their transfer to court or the rooms for remotely attending hearings. According to Reuters, detainees reported being threatened with rape by guards. Haaretz has reported on allegations of "inhumane treatment" of prisoners and detainees at Megiddo Prison, including "several cases of harsh violence and abuse carried out by prison wardens, included guards kicking, punching, hitting their testicles, and humiliating prisoners." Snopes confirmed that detained Gazan workers were forced to wear plastic ID tags around their wrists and ankles.

In a written statement obtained by Al Jazeera, one of the detainees arrested on October 8 told HaMoked that he was "kept in a 'cage' without a roof, under the sun and without food, water or access to the toilet for three days." Another detainee, a cleaner in his 60s, spoke to The Independent on the condition of anonymity, describing "humiliating" treatment, including being blindfolded with his hands and feet tied, while Israeli authorities called the detainees "Hamas" and "terrorists". He described beatings and the refusal of authorities to provide medication, food, and water to detainees, including the elderly and those with diabetes.

In May 2024, CNN reported that Israeli whistleblowers reported about the conditions of Palestinians held in a converted military base in the Negev desert, along with photographs of the prisoners. In their report the whistleblowers stated the men were forced to sit upright and not allowed to move or talk, and guards were instructed to pick out "problematic" prisoners and punish them. They also alleged that the camp was set up into two parts, enclosures that held about 70 prisoners who are placed under extreme physical restraint and a field hospital were wounded prisoners were strapped to their bed, and forced to wear diapers and fed through straws.

Noah Bseso, a 17-year-old prisoner released as part of the November prisoner exchange, described a "dark turn" in conditions of detention after October 7. Bseso told The Washington Post that rations had been cut: "Food was sometimes nothing more than bread, and not much of that," while water was "sometimes cut entirely." Before-and-after images released by the Palestinian Prisoners' Society went viral, showing the weight loss of a released 30-year-old man.

One released man from Shuja'iyya, Gaza City reported beatings, stating that a female Israeli soldier would beat a 72-year-old man. Another stated soldiers forced detainees to bark like dogs. Another twenty-year-old man detained in the West Bank stated that he was blindfolded, beaten, burned with a cigarette, and treated "like an animal". Three brothers detained from the Gaza Strip described similar treatment in Israel prison, stating they were beaten, stripped to their underwear, and burnt with cigarettes. One released man stated, "They let dogs urinate on us and shoved sand on us. They threatened to shoot us." Others described both physical and psychological torture. Five men reported being tortured over ten hours, including being beaten and submerged in cold water. One man stated that Palestinian prisoners were being "tortured relentlessly". He stated the detainees had been starved for three days.

A 70-year-old man stated he had been forced to kneel for hours and beaten by Israeli soldiers when he told them he didn't know anything about tunnels. In February 2024, a doctor stated he had been "detained from inside the hospital and I remained in Israeli prison for 45 days under severe torture and starvation. I did not commit any crime. My weapons are my pen, notebook and stethoscope. I did not leave the hospital, I was treating children inside." In April 2024, a man held for six months stated, "The amount of food we would get in prison was not enough. It was merely enough to keep us from dying".

==== Incommunicado detention of militants ====
On October 25, the ACRI appealed to the Chief Military Prosecutor and the State Prosecutor for assurances that the families of captured militants would be notified of their detention. The ACRI alleged war crimes and crimes against humanity by Hamas fighters during the October 7 invasion, and thus acknowledged a clear "legal basis to detain any Gaza Strip militant captured" in Israel since October 7 for security and investigative purposes, but noted Israel's "obligation to inform someone close to them about their arrest—both according to Israeli law and international law." The letter urged Israeli authorities to refrain from adopting the "standards of Hamas", referring to the capture of Israeli civilians.

The letter refers to Israel's Criminal Procedure Law, Article 106 of the Fourth Geneva Convention, and the 1989 High Court decision in Uda v. Commander of the IDF forces in the Judea and Samaria region.

=== Deaths in custody ===
The Globe and Mail reported on the death of two Palestinian detainees, Arafat Hamdan and Omar Daraghmeh. In the case of Hamdan, a 25-year-old house painter with diabetes and heart disease, Israeli soldiers reportedly entered his home, hooded him, and took him away. Hamdan reportedly died 48 hours later, having not received necessary medication.

On December 19, Haaretz reported hundreds of arrested Palestinians from Gaza were being held at Sde Teiman base near Be'er Sheva, in southern Israel, and that a number had died. Children and the elderly are among the detainees. Haaretz reported that the detainees were blindfolded and handcuffed for most of the day. Speaking to AFP, an IDF spokesperson described the deceased detainees as "terrorists", without further elaboration, and stated their deaths were "under investigation." The IDF did not provide any information regarding the number or circumstances of deaths. On 2 January, the IDF reported the death of 23-year-old Abdul Rahman al-Bahsh who had been imprisoned since May 2023.

It was reported in April 2024 that there had been at least eight deaths of Palestinian prisoners in Israeli jails since the 7 October attack, with the jails refusing to release the bodies of the deceased. In May 2024, Adnan al-Bursh, the head of orthopedics at Al-Shifa Hospital, died in an Israeli prison after four months in detention. Two Palestinian prisoners associations stated that at least eighteen Palestinians prisoners had died in Israeli custody since the start of the war. An internal investigation found Israeli soldiers had beaten two Palestinian detainees in the Sde Teiman detention camp to death. In June 2024, Adalah stated military orders were being used to "detain the bodies of Palestinian citizens for political purposes". Iyad al-Rantisi, the head of Kamal Adwan Hospital's women’s section, died under Shin Bet interrogation six days after he was detained. In August 2024, the Palestinian Commission of Detainees and Ex-Detainees Affairs stated that Wafaa Jarrar had died from serious injuries sustained while detained in Israeli prison.

==== Death of Omar Daraghmeh ====
On October 23, 2023, Omar Daraghmeh, a Hamas official in his late 50s, from the city of Tubas in the northern West Bank, died in custody in the Israeli Megiddo Prison. He had been arrested by Israeli forces along with his son in the West Bank on October 9. Hamas called the death of the Daraghmeh in custody an assassination and accused the prison service of torture.

The Prisoners and Ex-Prisoners' Affairs Authority and the Palestinian Prisoners Society said in a joint statement that Daraghmeh had been placed under administrative detention—detention without charge or trial—for a period of six months, based on evidence contained in a "secret file". In court sessions before the Ofer Military Court, Daraghmeh had told his lawyer, Ashraf Abu Sneineh, that he was in good health. Hundreds of Palestinians protested in Tubas in reaction to news of Daraghmeh's death.

==== Death of Walid Ahmad ====
In April 2025, it was announced that Walid Ahmad a teenager who had been held in the Megiddo prison for six months had died in Israeli custody, becoming the first minor to die in Israeli custody. Ahamd had been reportedly arrested in the West Bank after reportedly throwing stones at soldiers after the October 7 attacks, and had been brought to court multiple times without a trial date set or allowed contact with his lawyer. He had collapsed in a prison yard on March 23 and struck his head before dying shortly after according to eye witness accounts from fellow prisoners, who also raised claims of inaction by prison authorities.

Ahmad's family reported that he had been a healthy teenager prior to his arrest and raised concerns that he had contracted amoebic dysentery due to reports from other prisoners, and had suffered also from scabies. It was later published that the autopsy of Ahmad also raised concerns of starvation, and severe medical neglect due to severe muscle and fat loss and the presence of colitis and scabies.

== Prominent detainees ==
=== Artists, activists, and entertainers ===
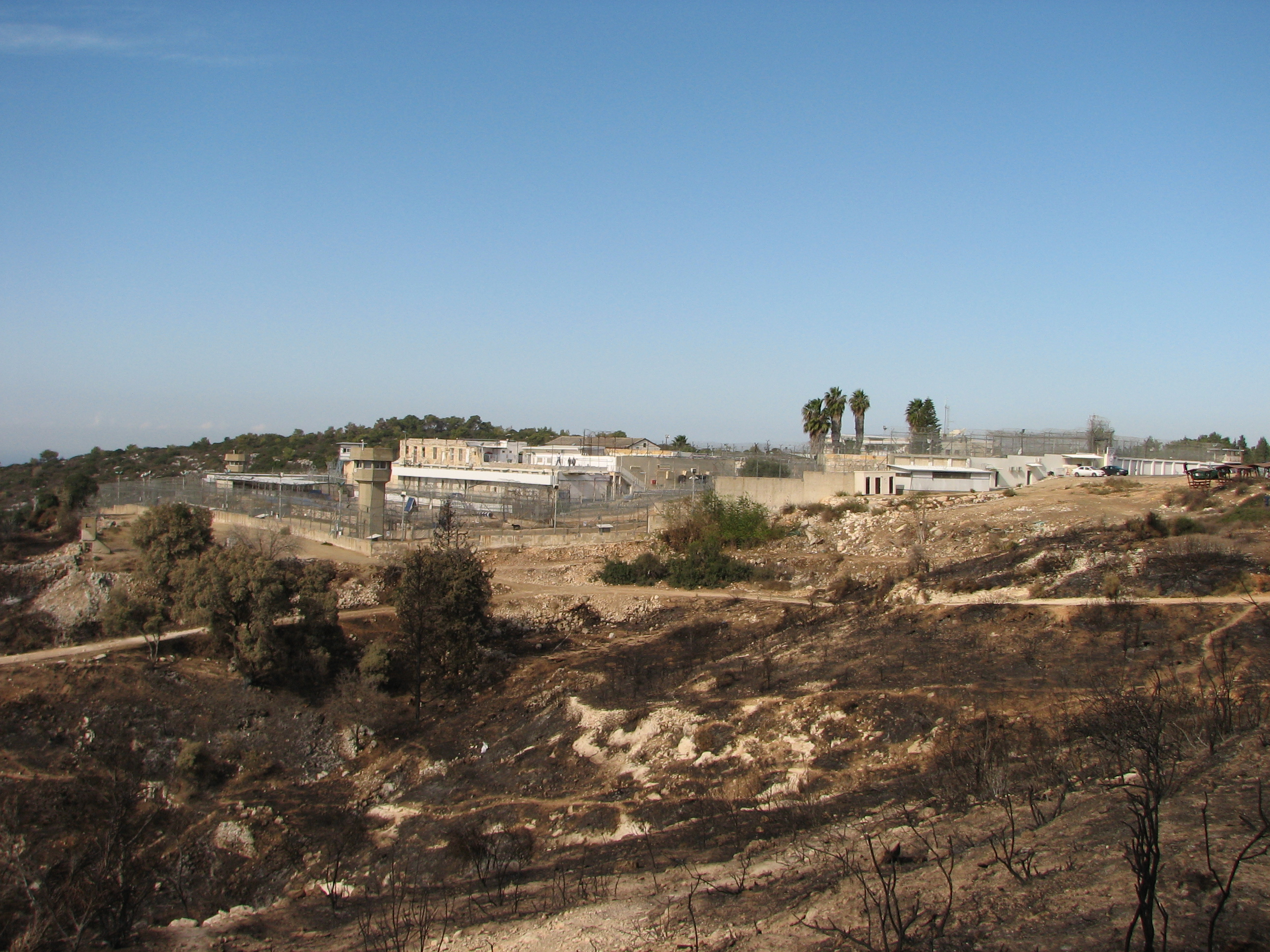
Damon Prison, where Ahed Tamimi was held.

==== Ahed Tamimi ====
On November 6, reports emerged that Israeli authorities had arrested prominent Palestinian activist Ahed Tamimi, during a wave of overnight raids and arrests on November 5–6 in which 70 Palestinians were detained. According to an IDF spokesperson, Tamimi was arrested on suspicion of "inciting violence and calling for terrorist activity to be carried out". The arrest followed Israeli media reports of a post on Instagram purported to belong to her that called for a violent massacre of Israeli settlers in the West Bank, referencing Adolf Hitler, although her family denies she authored the post, stating that her Instagram has been hacked before and that she is frequently impersonated online. Her father had been arrested by Israeli forces one week prior, and is being held in an undisclosed location. PEN International, an NGO that advocates for freedom of expression, confirmed that Tamimi was being held at Damon Prison, near Haifa, and called on Israel to release her immediately. As of November 27, Tamimi was being held incommunicado and without charge or trial; Israel had taken steps to transfer her to indefinite administrative detention. She and her lawyer had been unable to review the evidence against her. On November 29, Tamimi was released under the temporary ceasefire between Israel and Hamas.

==== Mosab Abu Toha ====
Mosab Abu Toha, a celebrated Palestinian poet, was arrested at gunpoint while attempting to evacuate with his family. Abu Toha, whose son is an American citizen, was told by American officials that they would be able to cross into Egypt through the Rafah Border Crossing. According to Diana Buttu, a Palestinian-Canadian lawyer working with his family, Abu Toha had been sent for by the US embassy. Conveying an account from Abu Toha's wife, Buttu told Time: "He was forced to put his son down... They were all forced to walk with their hands raised in the air. He raised his arms in the air … [and he and] around 200 others were taken out of this line and abducted. They have not heard from him since." Abu Toha was a contributor to The New Yorker, which reported on November 20 that his whereabouts were unknown. Literary Hub referred to his detention as a kidnapping by the IDF. On November 21, Democracy Now! reported that Abu Toha had been released after being taken to an Israeli prison in the Negev and beaten, according to a statement from Buttu. The Israeli Defense Forces issued a statement acknowledging that they detained a group of people, including Abu Toha, for interrogation following intelligence reports suggesting engagements with terrorist groups. The IDF confirmed that Abu Toha was set free subsequent to the interrogation.

==== Mohand Taha ====
Mohand Taha, a stand-up comedian and influencer from Lower Galilee, spoke to Haaretz in relation to his arrest by "20 police officers" after posting an Instagram story in solidarity with Gaza residents. He stated that authorities wanted to transfer him to Megiddo Prison, but that he was released from custody after two days following interventions by his lawyer.

==== Diala Ayesh ====
28-year-old human rights attorney Diala Ayesh was arrested at a checkpoint near Bethlehem and placed under administrative detention, meaning she can be incarcerated for a period of four months without trial or charge.

==== Mahmoud Almadhoun ====
In December 2023, Mahmoud Almadhoun was detained by the IDF. After his brother, Hani, recognized him in photos of blindfolded Palestinian men held by the IDF and spoke about him in the US media, he was released. In an op-ed for The Washington Post, Mahmoud recounted being "stripped to my underwear and paraded with other blindfolded men in the cold like circus animals" and wrote that none of the detained men were militants. He told PBS that the experience inspired him to help others; he later founded the Gaza Soup Kitchen with Hani.

=== Politicians ===
==== Arab-Israeli politicians ====
On November 9, four Arab-Israeli former lawmakers were detained. Mohammad Barakeh, chairman of the Higher Arab Monitoring Committee and a former Knesset member from the Hadash party, was detained for questioning, followed by three former Knesset members from the Balad party: Haneen Zoabi, Sami Abu Shehadeh, and Mtanes Shehadeh. Balad director general Yousef Tatur was also detained. Tatur and the former lawmakers were accused of planning a protest in Nazareth, with an expected attendance of around 50 people or fewer. Israeli authorities alleged that the demonstration was "liable to lead to incitement and harm public peace, in violation of police directives"; the ACRI described the detentions as "a new and dangerous expression of the government's unrestrained scathing attack on Arab society in general and its leadership in particular." Zoabi spent more than seven hours at the Migdal HaEmek police station, in Galilee, although she states that the interrogation lasted only 15 minutes.

==== Khalida Jarrar ====
Khalida Jarrar, a Palestinian politician affiliated with the Popular Front for the Liberation of Palestine (PFLP) was arrested in her home on December 26. Jarrar, who was elected to the Legislative Council following the 2006 Palestinian legislative election, had been previously arrested by Israel. Other leaders of the PFLP were arrested on the same date, in what the group described as a "vast campaign" to arrest its leaders in the occupied West Bank. On 10 January 2024, Jarrar's daughter stated Jarrar had been sentenced to six months in prison with the possibility of indefinite detention. At the end of August 2024, Jarrar was ordered to another six months in detention, despite no trial nor even charges filed against her.

=== Journalists ===
The Committee to Protect Journalists reported that nine Palestinian journalists had been arrested or detained as of November 6. By December 5, the number had risen to 19. On December 7, CJP reported the arrest of journalist Diaa Al-Kahlout and his family members in northern Gaza. On 10 January 2024, Reporters Without Borders stated at least 31 Palestinian journalists were being held in Israeli prisons, mostly without any charges. By 19 March 2024, around 60 journalists from the West Bank had been detained by Israeli forces since 7 October, with at least 40 remaining in detention.

==== Ismail al-Ghoul ====
On 18 March 2024, Al Jazeera journalist Ismail al-Ghoul was blindfolded and handcuffed for 12 hours after being arrested by Israeli forces during a raid at Al-Shifa Hospital. Israel destroyed his broadcast vehicle, cameras, and equipment. Imad Zaqqout, a Palestinian journalist, stated that al-Ghoul was beaten severely before being detained.

In response to al-Ghoul's arrest, Reporters Without Borders demanded his release. Committee to Protect Journalists condemned his arrest and stated it appeared like a deliberate attempt to prevent the media from documenting Israel's hospital raid. The International Press Institute stated it was deeply alarmed by al-Ghoul's arrest and called for his immediate release. According to Al Jazeera, the arrest of al-Ghoul was part of a pattern of targeting Al Jazeera journalists, including Samer Abu Daqqa and Hamza Dahdouh, who were both killed. The deputy chair of the Palestinian Journalists' Syndicate stated that Israeli forces were "intimidating journalists by showing that anyone who speaks out will be their next target".

Upon his release, Al-Ghoul stated, "We were left in the room we were kept in, where we stayed for several hours, in cold conditions, naked and blindfolded."

On 31 July 2024, Al-Ghoul would be killed by an Israeli rocket attack.

=== Medical professionals ===
==== Ahmed Kahlout ====
Ahmed Kahlout, the director of Kamal Adwan hospital in the northern Gaza Strip, was detained by Israeli forces in the aftermath of the Kamal Adwan Hospital siege in December 2023. After interrogation by the Shin Bet, Kahlout confessed that the hospital was used as a military operations center by Hamas and that he was a member of Hamas. The Gaza Health Ministry said that "Kahlout's confessions were extracted under the use of force, coercion, torture and intimidation."

=== Other ===
==== Musab Qatawi ====
Qatawi spent three years in Israeli detention. Qatawi was being held at the Nafha Prison, where he says he and his cellmates were beaten daily by guards. He said: “We were severely beaten… They insulted us a lot, stepped on us, used dogs against us. It was very hard.” He also noted a “lack of food, lack of hygiene, diseases”, calling on Palestinian and international organisations to protect detainees, saying their situation is “more than dangerous”. Before his release on 10 April 2025, Israeli prison guards shoved his head into a rubbish bin and shaved part of his hair, drawing the Star of David onto his head.

==== Orwah Sheikh Ali ====
A Palestinian man from Shu'fat refugee camp was beaten up by Israeli police and was then arrested. He was allegedly suspected by Israeli police of drug trafficking offences. 16 police officers were present at the arrest, but "none of their body cameras were working". In court, the man said police beat him with fists “on all parts of his body and covered his face with a cloth strip” before branding a Star of David onto his cheek. He later added that the police had also placed a plastic bag over his head. Vadim Shub, the public defender of the Jerusalem district, later stated: “As a law-abiding country, we must not put up with the phenomenon of police violence. In this case, the nature of the injuries raises a strong suspicion of attempted humiliation on a racial basis.”

The man was later named as Orwah Sheikh Ali. His lawyer said he denied all charges he was a drug dealer. Sheikh Ali was held in detention for four days before he was released by order of judge Adi Bar Tal. Sheikh Ali had not been allowed to be examined by a physician despite a ruling mandating this being issued. Police claimed that the marks happened when an officer pressed the laced-up part of their boot against the suspect’s face while they subdued him.

== Interrogations of detainees ==
Numerous Palestinian detainees have reported torture during interrogations by Israeli forces, which has raised significant alarm among international human rights groups such as Amnesty International. One detainee told Amnesty International that Israeli interrogators beat him severely, resulting in three broken ribs, and ordered Palestinian detainees to "praise Israel and curse Hamas". A Gazan worker detained in Israel stated that he and other detainees had been tortured for several days using an "electrical chair", as part of an interrogation by Israeli authorities. Dr. Shai Gortler, who studies incarceration and torture, stated that Shin Bet allows media exposure "to put forward its own narrative about its actions, torture included", among other reasons.

The IDF has alleged that interrogations of detainees captured in Israel following the October 7 attack revealed that Hamas commanders, who also held religious authority, had sanctioned targeting civilians, including children, women, and the elderly. The IDF characterized the evidence obtained through these interrogations as revealing a premeditated plan to inflict maximum civilian casualties. NBC News notes that it is unclear whether the men depicted were speaking under duress in videos released by Israeli authorities. The interrogation sessions were held over four weeks, mainly in a southern Israeli prison, and concluded in early November. The IDF alleged that interrogated militants revealed tactics related to the placement of their tunnels and munitions in Gaza neighbourhoods.

== Analysis ==
In a report to the United Nations General Assembly on 24 October 2023, Francesca Albanese, the UN Special Rapporteur on the occupied Palestinian territories, noted that the failure to notify parents of the whereabouts of their children following an arrest is a violation of the Convention on the Rights of the Child, and can be considered a forced disappearance. Defense for Children International reported in October 2024 that the rate of childhood administrative detention was the highest since it began keeping records. Albanese further noted that transferring civilian populations from occupied territories (i.e. from the West Bank to prisons in Israel) is a war crime.

Israeli authorities and media outlets have justified the mass detentions as a counterterrorism measure or a response to violence. The Times of Israel has sent reporters to join IDF reservist battalions during overnight raids in the West Bank, describing the arrests as quelling a potential front in the ongoing war. The IDF stated it had arrested 2,000 West Bank Palestinians as of November 29, including 1,100 it alleged were affiliated with Hamas.

Reuters notes that prisons are overseen by Israel's far-right Minister of National Security, Itamar Ben-Gvir, "who has long advocated for a crackdown on Palestinian prisoners", and has expressed support for a bill providing for the execution of militants. Legal analysts and former Israeli police stated Ben-Gvir was weaponizing the national police force to serve his extreme ultranationalist political agenda.

Several of the human rights organizations listed above describe the revocation of work permits and the detention of Palestinian workers as a form of retaliation by Israel for the October 7 attack by Hamas and the capture of Israeli citizens by Palestinian armed groups. Al Jazeera referred to social media commentary comparing the reported abuse to the Abu Ghraib torture and prisoner abuse scandal. In April 2024, Addameer stated, "Surveillance on social media targets anyone showing sympathy with Gaza, which is considered incitement for violence or as support for a 'terrorist organisation'". In June 2024, Israeli lawmakers approved a bill which would reserve administrative detention for non-Jews only.

B'Tselem considered the mass detention of Palestinians in its report on the Gaza genocide.

== Reactions ==
=== International ===
Russian Permanent Representative to the United Nations Vasily Nebenzya stated that the situation in the West Bank deserved close scrutiny by the Security Council, specifically citing "arbitrary arrests" by Israel.

United Nations High Commissioner for Human Rights Volker Türk referred to daily "violence from Israeli forces and settlers, ill treatment, arrests, evictions, intimidation and humiliation" in the West Bank, and called on Israeli authorities to respect Palestinian rights. On December 1, the UN Human Rights Office expressed serious concern regarding the dramatic rise in arrests. In a statement, Türk called for "an end to practices of arbitrary detention by Israel".

In response to a question posed at a meeting of NATO Ministers of Foreign Affairs on November 29, Canadian Minister of Foreign Affairs Mélanie Joly stated that "arrestations [sic] must be done according to the rule of law and international law", while calling for condemnation of and an end to "violence". Doctors Without Borders stated it was "deeply concerned" about a staff member detained by the Israelis in Khan Younis, calling on the IDF to guarantee his "dignity and ensure his wellbeing". In April 2024, the Archbishop of Canterbury Justin Welby criticized Israel's arrest of a Palestinian Christian woman.

=== In Israel and Palestine ===
In a meeting between Red Cross president Mirjana Spoljaric Egger and Qadura Fares, the head of the Ministry of Detainees and Ex-Detainees Affairs, Fares requested for international intervention, stating Palestinian prisoners were "living the worst conditions" in history.

Justices of the Supreme Court of Israel stated they would tour Israeli prisons amidst reports of Palestinian prisoners' deaths and deteriorating prison conditions. Palestinian activist Mustafa Barghouti stated more than a thousand Palestinian detainees were experiencing "brutal torture and severe beatings" in Israeli prisons.

In December 2023, Minister of National Security Ben-Gvir stated he was replacing Katy Perry, the chief commissioner of the Israel Prison Service, because she was too lax and not harsh enough. In March 2024, Netanyahu ordered the Israeli defence, national security, and finance ministers to prepare Israeli prisons for thousands of new Palestinian prisoners. The IDF military police launched criminal investigations in June 2024 into the death of 48 Palestinians during the war, most of whom were detainees.

In June 2024 the Palestinian Legislative Council in Gaza demanded for an international inspection of Israeli detention centers after a number of released detainees, reportedly left the centers after months appearing frail and thin. The council raised allegations that the prisoners were subjected to starvation, isolation and torture.

== See also ==
- Gaza war hostage crisis
- Administrative detention
- Anti-Palestinian racism during the Gaza war
- Cruel, inhuman or degrading treatment
- Enforced disappearance
- Confessions of detained Palestinians in the Gaza war
- Palestinian prisoners in Israel

== Reports ==
- OHCHR, Detention in the context of the escalation of hostilities in Gaza, 31 July 2024.
- B'Tselem, Welcome to Hell: The Israeli Prison System as a Network of Torture Camps, 6 August 2024.
