= Torture during the Gaza war =

During the Gaza war, Israel has been accused of systematically torturing Palestinians detained in its prison system. This torture has been reported by the United Nations, Human Rights Watch, Amnesty International, as well as Israeli nonprofit human rights organizations such as Physicians for Human Rights Israel and B'Tselem.

According to these sources, Palestinian men, women and children in Gaza and in detainment in Israel in locations such as the Sde Teiman detention camp have been subjected to rape, gang-rape, sexualized torture, and mutilation, among other forms of sexual violence, as well as psychological and physical torture by both male and female Israeli soldiers and medical staff.

Some of the victims were United Nations staff forced to confess to terrorism offenses. Multiple reports also speak of prisoners who suffered from medical neglect for injuries sustained, which led to cases of arm and leg amputations. Their testimonies have been corroborated by whistleblowing Israeli staff and a CNN investigation.

As of August 2024, at least 53 Palestinian detainees have died in Israeli military facilities since the beginning of the war. Numerous Palestinian detainees have provided testimony of torture by Israeli forces, including during interrogations, Israeli prison guards also spoke out. There were further reports of the Israeli torture of accused militants.

In response, Shin Bet officials stated they conduct militant interrogations within the Israeli legal framework. According to Yuval Ginbar, torture is considered legal under certain circumstances.

== Background ==
Torture, ill-treatment, and sexual violence of detained Palestinians by Israel, have been reportedly prevalent for years before the 7 October attacks and invasion of Gaza, with documentation recorded by the Public Committee Against Torture in Israel (PCATI) and Amnesty International. There has been extensive sexual violence against both male and female detainees, with the most notable case of imprisoned Lebanese Amal leader Mustafa Dirani, who sued Israel on the claim of rape. According to the United Nations Convention Against Torture, torture is defined as "any act by which severe pain or suffering, whether physical or mental, is intentionally inflicted on a person" in order to extract information or serve out punishment.

== Reports of Israeli torture ==
Doctors reported humiliation, beatings, and being forced to kneel for hours. One released man from Shuja'iyya, Gaza City reported beatings, stating that a female Israeli soldier would beat a 72-year-old man. Another stated soldiers forced detainees to bark like dogs. A twenty-year-old man detained in the West Bank stated that he was blindfolded, beaten, burned with a cigarette, and treated "like an animal". Three brothers detained from the Gaza Strip described similar treatment in Israel prison, stating they were beaten, stripped to their underwear, and burnt with cigarettes. One released man stated, "They let dogs urinate on us and shoved sand on us. They threatened to shoot us."

Others described both physical and psychological torture. Five men reported being tortured over ten hours, including being beaten and submerged in cold water. One man stated that Palestinian prisoners were being "tortured relentlessly". He stated the detainees had been starved for three days. In a report by the Ministry of Detainees and Ex-Detainees Affairs, a detainee stated, "I heard the sound of detainees who are getting tortured and beaten, as they are being cursed on by soldiers".

=== By NGOs ===
==== Amnesty International ====
In November 2023, Amnesty International reported on cases of torture and degrading treatment by Israeli authorities, which it described as "horrifying", "gruesome", and "a particularly chilling public display of torture and humiliation of Palestinian detainees." Amnesty's Secretary General, Agnès Callamard, stated, "Arbitrary detention and torture and other ill-treatment are war crimes when committed against protected persons in an occupied territory." In July 2024, Amnesty interviewed 27 released detainees, who stated they had been subjected to torture on at least one occasion while in Israeli prison.

==== United Nations ====
The United Nations Human Rights Office in the occupied Palestinian territories called for an investigation into allegations of torture. In a statement, the Office said: "The massive rise in number of Palestinians arrested and detained, the number of reports of ill-treatment and humiliation suffered by those in custody, and the reported failure to adhere to basic due process raise serious questions about Israel's compliance with international humanitarian law and international human rights law." On 19 January 2024, the Human Rights Office stated they had interviewed detainees who "described being beaten, humiliated, subjected to ill-treatment, and to what may amount to torture... consistent with reports our Office has been gathering of the detention of Palestinians on a broad scale." On 19 January 2024, Ajith Sunghay, a Human Rights Office official stated, "There are reports of men who are subsequently released but only in diapers without any adequate clothing in this cold weather."

In March 2024, a UNRWA report reported instances of torture documented in Israeli prisons, including beatings and sexual assault. Some UNRWA employees reported being tortured to extract forced confessions. In an April 2024 report, UNRWA stated, "Male victims reported beatings to their genitals, while one detainee reported being made to sit on an electrical probe." In a July 2024 report, the UN stated that Israel had used dogs and waterboarding on Gazan detainees, and that at least 53 died. A group of United Nations special rapporteurs stated in August 2024 that they had received substantiated reports of "widespread abuse, torture, sexual assault and rape". The experts stated further that survivors reported "being attacked by dogs, waterboarding, suspension from ceilings and severe sexual and gender-based violence."

A report by UN Special Rapporteur Francesca Albanese called Israel's torture of Palestinians "a structural feature of the ongoing genocide and broader settler-colonial apartheid."

==== Israeli NGOs ====
The Public Committee Against Torture in Israel (PCATI) stated that there was a "lot of evidence of cases of violence and cruel and humiliating treatment by prison guards", and called for an investigation into the deaths of detainees in Israeli custody. PCATI stated they had documented nine clear instances of torture, including sexual violence. Addameer reported that prisoners remained blindfolded and handcuffed during their detention and people were being killed in the military camps. Addameer further reported, "Statistics and documented testimonies from child detainees indicate that the majority of detained children have been subjected to one or more forms of physical and psychological torture." Adalah reported, "We're seeing really widespread and systemic use of many, many tools in order to inflict torture and ill-treatment on Palestinians". In July 2024, the executive director of HaMoked stated, "Violence is pervasive. It's very overcrowded. Every prisoner that we've met with has lost 30 pounds."

On 5 August 2024, B'Tselem released a report finding that Israeli torture of Palestinian detainees was so systemic and institutionalized that it should now be considered state policy. In its report, B'Tselem stated that "every inmate is deliberately subjected to severe, relentless pain and suffering, operate as de-facto torture camps." They further stated that prisoners were subjected to beatings, humiliation, sleep deprivation, and sexual violence. Director Yuli Novak said that Israel was running torture camps, whose conditions the organization blamed on Itamar Ben-Gvir, the minister in charge of Israel's prison system.

==== Human Rights Watch ====
On 3 January 2024, Human Rights Watch reported that Palestinian workers from Gaza detained in Israel since October 7 had been photographed naked, attacked by dogs, and dragged faced down in the gravel. In August 2024, an HRW report stated that released healthcare workers from Gaza described "humiliation, beatings, forced stress positions, prolonged cuffing and blindfolding, and denial of medical care. They also reported torture, including rape and sexual abuse by Israeli forces, denial of medical care, and poor detention conditions" while in Israel detention. A surgeon detained in Israeli prison stated, "Every minute we were beaten. I mean all over the body, on sensitive areas between the legs, the chest, the back. We were kicked all over the body and the face. They used the front of their boots which had a metal tip, then their weapons."

=== Other reports ===
In a report on allegations of torture in Israeli prisons, Euro-Med Monitor stated prisoners were being treated like animals. The Wall Street Journal found detainees underwent psychological and physical abuse, including beatings during interrogations. The Commission for Detainees' Affairs alleged that prisoners and detainees were subject to bans on going outside, confiscation of belongings, reduction in food, torture and beatings, and deprivation of medical attention by Israeli authorities. A Defence for Children International report included the testimony of an incarcerated child who stated, "Around 18 children were severely beaten, screaming in pain. I saw police dogs attacking them, bleeding from the mouth and head." An additional Defence for Children report stated that the Israeli military was "systematically detaining and torturing" Palestinian children from Gaza.

In December 2023, The New York Times reported that Israel had interrogated medical personnel in Gaza under duress. Gaza's Ministry of Health similarly stated that Israeli interrogations of hospital staff were conducted "under duress". Following reports on the physical and psychological abuse of Marwan Barghouti, the U.S. Department of State requested Israel to "thoroughly and transparently investigate credible allegations of and ensure accountability for any abuses or violations". In a letter to Israel's attorney general, a doctor at an Israeli field hospital for detained Palestinians stated, "Inmates are fed through straws, defecate in diapers and are held [in] constant restraints, which violate medical ethics and the law."

In May 2024, an employee of the Deutsche Gesellschaft für Internationale Zusammenarbeit stated she had been subject to beatings and abusive treatment in Israeli prison. The Commission for Detainees' Affairs stated that doctors at the Ramon prison were neglecting the medical needs of Palestinian detainees. In June 2024, a Palestinian man stated he had been tortured after being held for a month with no charges. The same month, the family of a mentally unwell man stated he was tortured during Israeli custody. Save the Children released a report stating, "Children are also among those recently found in mass graves, according to UN experts, with many showing signs of torture and summary executions".

In July 2024, a Palestinian man from Gaza stated he experienced "severe torture" in Israeli prison, stating, "The beatings focused on sensitive body parts. Female soldiers stomped on our heads with their metal-toed boots." The same month, the director of Al-Shifa Hospital was released from Israeli prison, stating also that Palestinian detainees experienced "almost daily torture" and abuse. Following his release from Israeli prison, a Palestinian detainee from Bethlehem stated, "We were unjustly detained, killed and severely beaten with iron clubs and subjected to all kinds of torture". A man detained from Gaza stated, "For 55 days, I was handcuffed, blindfolded, deprived from sleeping, no rest, even food they brought us was for animals... They dealt with us as non-humans". One man stated that before interrogations, he was kept in a room where bright lights and blaring music were used all day and night, stating, "I would stay there two or three days, the music didn't stop, not even for a second. It hurt me mentally". Eight detainees released from Israeli prison in late-July stated they were tortured during their imprisonment.

A released prisoner stated, "There are people who have gone mad and urinate on themselves... They screamed. At night they used to bring dogs, pepper spray, and electrocute us. Every night. Whatever comes to your mind was done." In August 2024, the Palestinian Ministry of Prisoners and Freed Prisoners stated a 26-year-old detainee died in Israeli prison from severe torture. Detainees released from Israeli prisons described worsening abuse, stating they were experiencing frequent beatings and a lack of basic rations. Speaking to the Commission of Detainees' Affairs, a released detainee stated, "We were stripped of our clothes, intensively beaten, tortured and assaulted. They shackled our hands and feet and blindfolded our eyes. We were turned into prey to these monsters, who enjoyed our hunger, thirst, screams and illnesses". In September 2024, +972 Magazine reported the spread of scabies among prisoners, with a dermatologist stating that "scabies can be effectively treated, but containing the outbreak requires sanitary living conditions. The failure of the IPS to do so suggests that the spread of the disease among prisoners has become, in effect, a part of their punishment".

In March 2025, according to the Palestinian Prisoners Club, a non-governmental organization that advocates for the rights and welfare of Palestinian prisoners held in Israeli jails, reported that a 17-year-old teenager named Walid Khaled Abdullah Ahmad died in Megiddo prison due to unknown circumstances while under Israeli custody. Ahmad was originally detained by Israeli forces on 30 September 2024, from the town of Silwad.

=== Posted to social media ===
Videos posted to social media, appearing to show IDF troops subjecting Palestinian detainees to physical, sexual and verbal abuse. One such video was posted at around 31 October and showed a group of Palestinian men blindfolded with their hands and feet bound and mostly stripped naked being physically assaulted by uniformed IDF soldiers. The soldiers involved were reportedly being investigated by IDF officials, per a later statement. A Palestinian woman recounted that about 30 minutes after her husband was arrested by IDF troops she was sent a link to a video on social media, depicting her husband in IDF custody bound and kneeling before a soldier who can be heard yelling expletives in Arabic while kicking him in the stomach.

In a Telegram group created after the 7 October attacks, by the IDF Influencing Department and had over 10,500 subscribers as of December 2023, videos of Palestinians being degraded and mocked with dehumanizing language. In one video two Palestinian men are defaced to be made to look like pigs with the caption exclaiming: "Here we see the al-Qawsami brothers, who we are sure their mother (who probably conceived them with her brother) is very proud of her breathtaking two roaches."

== Torture of United Nations staff ==
According to February 2024 UNRWA report, Israeli officials detained and tortured UN staff, coercing them into falsely stating that agency staff had participated in the 7 October attack. The allegations of torture came from staff who stated they were forced to make confessions under torture and ill-treatment, including "beatings, sleep deprivation, sexual abuse and threats of sexual violence against both men and women" in Israeli detention. Detainees reported being stripped down to their underwear and forced completely naked. The report found that UN staff were "pressured to make false statements against the Agency, including that the Agency has affiliations with Hamas and that UNRWA staff members took part in the 7 October 2023 atrocities" through beatings, waterboarding, and threats to their families.

In a statement, the UNRWA communications director stated, "When the war comes to an end there needs to be a series of inquiries to look into all violations of human rights". The Israel Defense Forces stated it was investigating "complaints of inappropriate behavior".

In response to the report, the World Organisation Against Torture condemned Israel, stating, "Both torture and the use of any such information violates the UN Convention Against Torture".

== Allegations of abuse and torture against flotilla activists ==
On 22 May 2026, organizers of the Global Sumud Flotilla alleged that activists that were detained by Israel who were trying to send aid to Gaza, were subjected to sexual abuse, with some were forced to be hospitalized due to injuries. According to the organizers, at least 15 cases of sexual abuse were reported, including rape, as well as "forcible penetration by a handgun". The organization also stated that activists were shot with rubber bullets at close range and several people's bones were broken during detention. According to Australian film maker and activist Julie Lamont, she stated to CNN that she was beaten and sexually assaulted by five men while being transported in a shipping container, to which she referred to it as an Israeli "prison boat." British activist Richard Johan Anderson told the BBC: "We've been beaten, tortured, systematically dehumanised, and... we have just had a little taste of what the Palestinians go through every day." Canadian human rights activist and IT manager of McGill University, Ehab Lotayef, stated that his hand was slashed by an Israeli soldier, forcing him to receive treatment after landing in Turkey. The Israeli human rights organization Adalah also reported that one of the detained activists was "forced to strip naked and run while guards were laughing".

The Israel Prison Service denied the accusations, stating that the allegations were false and without "factual basis" as well as said that the detainees are under professionally trained prison staff and held under accordance with the law. The agency also said that the prisoners were provided with medical care in accordance with guidelines of the Israeli Ministry of Health and "professional medical judgement".

On 5 June, French anti-terrorism prosecutors announced that a probe has opened by the National Counterterrorism Prosecutor's Office (PNAT) to investigate into suspected torture and war crimes over Israel's mistreatment of French flotilla activists during detention.

== Sde Teiman detention camp ==
Sde Teiman (Hebrew: שדה תימן) is an Israeli military base located in the Negev desert near the border with the Gaza Strip. During the Gaza war, it gained international attention for systemic human rights violations against its Palestinian detainees from the strip.

Multiple released Palestinian detainees have testified they and others, including children, were subjected to rape, gang-rape, other forms of sexual violence as well as psychological and physical torture by both male and female Israeli soldiers and medical staff. Multiple reports also speak of prisoners who suffered from medical neglect for injuries sustained, which led to cases of arm and leg amputations. Their testimonies have been corroborated by whistleblowing Israeli staff and a CNN investigation. The mistreated detainees also included Palestinian healthcare workers who had been captured during Israeli raids on Gaza's hospitals.

== Torture of alleged militants during interrogation ==
Numerous Palestinian detainees have reported torture during interrogations by Israeli forces, which has raised significant alarm among international human rights groups such as Amnesty International. One detainee told Amnesty that Israeli interrogators beat him severely, resulting in three broken ribs, and ordered Palestinian detainees to "praise Israel and curse Hamas". Dr. Shai Gortler, who studies incarceration and torture, stated that Shin Bet allows media exposure "to put forward its own narrative about its actions, torture included", among other reasons.

The Associated Press analyzed six interrogation videos released by Israel and said the militants may have been speaking under duress. In the videos, the militants appear to be bloodied and wincing in pain. Likewise, on 29 October, an article in Global News said some of the confession videos of Hamas militants could have been produced under duress. AP additionally found that a confession video Israel released showed the captured militant was speaking "clearly under duress".

Public Committee Against Torture in Israel stated Shin Bet uses extreme heat and cold, sleep deprivation and stress positions during interrogations. In an analysis, NBC News stated that in one of the confession videos, the militant had blood on his shirt and bruises on his face, which Israel stated came from capture in combat. In November 2023, a Palestinian man (accused by Israel to be a militant) was released as part of the prisoner exchange and said he was repeatedly asked by Israeli soldiers to make confessions with "a gun to his face".

== War crimes ==
Video evidence surfaced of what was described as a "flagrant violation of international laws related to the protection of civilians" by Euro-Mediterranean Human Rights Monitor. Israeli soldiers were shown surrounding detainees in Yatta, Hebron who were being dragged and assaulted by the Israeli soldiers. Many of the detainees had been stripped naked, having both their arms and feet bound, and beaten with the butts of rifles and trampled. Video evidence depicting degradation towards detainees shows Israeli soldiers transporting Palestinians from Ofer prison, all of whom are blindfolded and stripped completely naked. In another video uploaded by an Israeli soldier, a blindfolded and bound Palestinian is shown kneeling on the ground. The soldier taunts him in Arabic, telling him "صباح الخير يا قحبة" (Good morning, whore) before repeatedly kicking and spitting on him. In December 2023, Human Rights Watch director Omar Shakir stated the blindfolding and stripping of Palestinian detainees represented a war crime.

In December 2023, Amnesty International called for an investigation into mass detentions, disappearances, inhumane treatment, and detainee deaths. In February 2024, the BBC published a report detailing documented instances of Israeli soldiers abusing and humiliating Palestinian detainees, which Mark Ellis, an expert on international criminal tribunals, said showed possible violations of laws regarding prisoners of war. After the IDF dismissed one of the reservists shown in the video, Sir Geoffrey Nice, an expert on war crimes, stated a wider investigation was needed beyond the dismissal. In March 2024, the United Nations stated that Israel had detained and tortured its employees in Gaza, extracting forced confessions. A Bellingcat analysis found instances of a collection of images and videos showing the IDF degrading Palestinian detainees, which Queen's University Belfast war crimes professor Luke Moffett stated showed potential war crimes.

In August 2024, a group of United National special rapporteurs stated they had received substantiated reports of widespread abuse, torture, and rape, possibly amounting to crimes against humanity. In October 2024, human rights activist Aryeh Neier wrote that Israel's torture of detainees had violated "many norms and provisions of international law that the country has signed and ratified or that are so accepted worldwide that they have the status of customary international law and bind all governments".

In February 2026, Al Jazeera reported on the handover of 54 bodies and human remains of Palestinians in Gaza without identifying information. The bodies were handed over to Palestinian families by Israel through the Red Cross. According to the report, several of the 54 bodies were mutilated and showed many signs of torture.

== Israeli explanations ==
In November 2023, Shin Bet said they have conducted interrogations under strict legal frameworks, aiming to gather confessions and intelligence for immediate and future use. The interrogation settings, as reported, were intense, with the suspects often bound and held in improvised facilities. They cited a 1999 Israeli Supreme Court ruling that prohibited torture except for a "ticking bomb" scenario.

== Reactions ==
Following the death of Adnan al-Bursh, the Palestinian Centre for Human Rights, Addameer, Al Mezan, and Al-Haq released a joint statement calling for "immediate and concrete action" by the international community to ensure investigative access into Israeli prisons. In May 2024, Addameer called on the International Criminal Court to investigate Israel's "systematic torture" of Palestinians as a war crime. Basil Farraj, a professor at Birzeit University, stated, "We are now talking about an intensification of the torture practices, including systematic medical negligence and systematic starvation." Alice Jill Edwards, the UN special rapporteur on torture, called on Israel to allow "access to international human rights and humanitarian observers". Former Guantanamo Bay detainees compared images they were seeing from Israel to their experiences in Guantanamo. An attorney who visited the Sde Teiman detention center in June 2024 stated, "The situation there is more horrific than anything we've heard about Abu Ghraib and Guantanamo." In July 2024, the UN human rights office stated the abuse and torture of Palestinian detainees in Israeli prisons was "unacceptable" and called for an independent investigation.

== See also ==
- Mass detentions in the Gaza war
- Sexual and gender-based violence against Palestinians during the Gaza war
- Torture during the Algerian War
