= Sexual and gender-based violence against Palestinians during the Gaza war =

During the ongoing Gaza war, Israeli male and female soldiers, guards and medical staff have reportedly committed wartime sexual violence against Palestinian women, children and men including rape, gang-rape and sexualized torture and genital mutilation. In February 2024, UN experts reported at least two cases of Palestinian women being raped by male Israeli soldiers. Palestinian boys and men have also been reportedly raped and subjected to torture, and in some cases, the impact of rape and torture has led to death of the victim.

In its June 2024 investigative report, the UN's Independent International Commission of Inquiry on the Occupied Palestinian Territory (CoI) concluded,

The frequency, prevalence and severity of sexual and gender-based crimes perpetrated against Palestinians since 7 October across the Occupied Palestinian Territories (OPT) indicate that specific forms of Sexual and gender-based violence (SGBV) are part of Israeli Security Forces (ISF) operating procedures.

In August 2024, Israeli human rights organization, B'Tselem, released a report on systematic Israeli abuse, torture, sexual violence and rape of Palestinian detainees, calling the Israeli prison system a "network of torture camps". The report includes extensive testimonies from Palestinians. The Guardian also interviewed Palestinian detainees, and reported they "back up [the] report by rights group B'Tselem, which says jails should now be labelled 'torture camps'."

In March 2025, the UN’s Independent International Commission of Inquiry on the Occupied Palestinian Territory published a report on sexual and gender-based abuses perpetrated by Israel against the Palestinian people, which concluded that sexual abuse of Palestinians is "committed either under explicit orders or with implicit encouragement by Israel's top civilian and military leadership." Acts of sexual violence such as compulsory nudity, rape threats and sexual assault "comprise part of the Israeli Security Forces' standard operating procedures toward Palestinians", says the report, with Commission member Chris Sidoti adding that, "Sexual violence is now so widespread that it can only be considered systematic. It's got beyond the level of random acts by rogue individuals." In addition to concluding that Israel uses sexual violence to "dominate and destroy the Palestinian people", the report also lists several measures taken by Israel during the Gaza War, such as the bombing of Gaza's reproductive clinics and restrictions on the arrival of medical supplies, as genocidal acts aimed at destroying the reproductive rights of Palestinian women and preventing the birth of Palestinian babies.

In May 2026, Israel was added to the United Nations blacklist of countries committing wartime sexual violence. The UN states that a thorough investigation into the sexual abuse of Palestinians by Israelis is being hindered by Israeli bans on visits by UN experts and Israeli threats of retaliation against Palestinian detainees if they report abuse after their release.

== Sexual abuse prior to the October 7 attacks ==
Documented cases of torture, ill-treatment, and sexual violence against detained Palestinians by Israel predate the 7 October attacks and invasion of Gaza, with records compiled by the Public Committee Against Torture in Israel (PCATI) and Amnesty International. There have been extensive reports of sexual violence against both male and female detainees, including imprisoned Lebanese Amal leader Mustafa Dirani who sued Israel. Josh Paul, a former official of the US State Department stated that his office had verified a report of Palestinian child who had been raped in an Israeli detention center. In a 2012 article entitled "The Blot of a Light Cloud: Israeli Soldiers, Army, and Society in the Intifada", Israeli academics (and former IDF soldiers) Nuphar Ishay-Krien and Yoel Elizur quoted another, anonymous soldier as saying that "I have no problem with women. One threw a slipper at me, so I gave her a kick here (pointing to the groin), broke all this here. She can't have children today." In a 2024 Haaretz article, Yoel Elizur goes on to add that "These soldiers were remorseless and did not report moral injury. Some of them were convicted by military courts. They felt bitter and betrayed."

The UN's Commission of Inquiry concludes in its June 2024 report that Israeli sexual and gender-based violence against Palestinians precedes October 7 and arises out of the context of the occupation: "SGBV constitutes a major element in the ill-treatment of Palestinians, intended to humiliate the community at large. This violence is intrinsically linked to the wider context of inequality and prolonged occupation, which have provided the conditions and the rationale for gender-based crimes, to further accentuate the subordination of the occupied people. The Commission notes that these crimes must be addressed by tackling their root."

== Rape and sexual assault of women and girls ==
On 19 February 2024, a group of United Nations special rapporteurs released a report stating "rights experts call for probe into violations against Palestinian women and girls." According to the report, there is evidence that during the Gaza war, Palestinian women and girls were subjected to wartime sexual violence. According to these reports, Palestinian women and girls were also subjected to inhuman and degrading treatment by the IDF, such as they were denied menstruation pads, food and medicine, and were severely beaten, raped, assaulted, threatened with rape and sexual violence, and subjected to multiple forms of sexual assaults. Palestinian women and girls were also stripped naked and searched by male Israeli army officers. OHCHR denounced that Israeli troops had photographed female detainees in “degrading circumstances” and that the photos had been uploaded online.

The UN report states, "Palestinian women and girls in detention have also been subjected to multiple forms of sexual assault, such as being stripped naked and searched by male Israeli army officers. At least two female Palestinian detainees were reportedly raped". One of the special rapporteurs; Reem Alsalem, cautioned that the reservation in reporting sexual violence was common due to reprisal concerns. Alsalem stated that since the 7 October attacks, women and girls in Israeli detention had faced an increasingly permissive attitude by Israeli officials towards sexual assault. According to Middle East Eye, the phrase "at least" highlighted the fact that many occurrences remain unrecorded, as victims dread the stigma and repercussions associated with speaking out about sexual abuse in "a patriarchal society reluctant to address such atrocities".

The special rapporteurs have also raised concerns over a number of Palestinian women and children going missing, with reports of children being separated from their parents. In one instance a female infant was reportedly forcibly moved to Israel by the IDF. In response to the report, a spokesman for the U.S. Department of State said, "Civilians and detainees must be treated humanely, and in accordance with international humanitarian law." Physicians for Human Rights–Israel also described the sexual humiliation of detainees, including sexual insults and urination on prisoners.

The Associated Press in March 2024 reported on Palestinian women giving testimony about having been abused during their detention by Israel, one woman said that Israeli soldiers conducted strip searches, and during the detention, if "we raised our heads or uttered any words, they beat us on the head [...] Loud music, shouting and intimidation — they wanted to humiliate us. We were handcuffed, blindfolded, and our feet were tied in chains"; another woman alleged that an Israeli soldier smashed her face into a wall when she would not kiss the flag of Israel.

A detailed and legally mandated June 2024 investigative report by the Independent International Commission of Inquiry on the Occupied Palestinian Territory stated both Israel and Hamas had committed sexual violence and torture, along with intentional attacks on civilians. Regarding Israeli actions against Palestinians, the report concludes that sexual and gender-based violence (SGBV) is deployed by Israeli forces and civilians against Palestinian women and men, throughout the occupied Palestinian territories. The report concludes that: "The frequency, prevalence and severity of sexual and gender-based crimes perpetrated against Palestinians since 7 October across the Occupied Palestinian Territories (OPT) indicate that specific forms of Sexual and gender-based violence (SGBV) are part of Israeli Security Forces (ISF) operating procedures."

The Commission's report was completed through the use of interviewing victims and witnesses along with a variety of other means, and Israel had previously announced its refusal to cooperate. The report indicates that sexual violence was used by the IDF to push the idea of "the subordination of an occupied people" in both Gaza and the Israeli-occupied West Bank.

In December 2024, dozens of Palestinian women and girls reported that sexual abuse were committed against them by Israeli forces during the storming of the Kamal Adwan hospital. They described being forced to undress, strip-searched and sexually harassed. Those who attempted to resist were "brutally beaten". One witness stated "They told us they would film us to show [the world] that Hamas was using us as human shields. When we arrived, they dragged us by our hair across the schoolyard, forced us into toilets, and ordered us to undress".

In March 2025, a report by the Independent International Commission of Inquiry on the Occupied Palestinian Territory, including East Jerusalem, and Israel, submitted to the Human Rights Council, detailed the systematic use of sexual and gender-based violence by Israeli Security Forces since October 2023. The report documented multiple instances of Israeli soldiers attempting to humiliate Palestinian women by wearing or posing with their underwear and sharing the images online, while referring to them as "prostitutes" and "sluts." The Commission also detailed instances of sexual violence directed against Palestinian girls. Female prisoners were forced to pose in degrading circumstances, including in their underwear and in front of an Israeli flag, with the photos also circulated online. They were subjected to sexual assault, harassment, forced nudity, and threats of rape.

== Sexual abuse, rape, and sexualized torture of boys and men ==
Reports by the Independent International Commission of Inquiry, B’Tselem, and international media document testimonies from Palestinian detainees describing sexual and gender-based violence against men and boys in Israeli detention facilities during the Gaza war. These accounts describe abuse during arrest and interrogation, including forced nudity, sexual humiliation, beatings to the genital area, and the use of dogs against naked detainees. Some testimonies also report rape, sexual assault with objects, and other degrading acts during interrogations.

Medical and institutional accounts document severe clinical trauma resulting from detention abuses, including penile and rectal bleeding, haematuria, cases of rectal rupture requiring emergency surgery and stoma formation, and the loss of one or both testicles following severe genital beatings. In February 2026, the Committee to Protect Journalists reported that among 59 Palestinian journalists interviewed after release from Israeli detention, 17 (29%) described experiencing sexual violence, including two accounts of rape.

Former detainees also reported witnessing similar treatment of others in custody, alongside severe physical violence, starvation, and psychological abuse. The testimonies describe detention conditions characterised by coercion and humiliation, within a broader pattern of alleged mistreatment.

In March 2024, an investigation by The Independent based on indictments, autopsy reports and testimonies from detainees described abuses and torture of Palestinians in Israeli facilities, including torture, sexual violence, and rape with sharp objects.

In April 2024, a Palestinian prisoner released from the Sde Teiman torture camp described how guards used carrots and iron batons to rape prisoners.

The UN CoI report from June 2024 notes that "Men and boys experienced specific persecutory acts, including sexual and gender-based violence amounting to torture and inhuman and cruel treatment." The report documented a "significant increase" in the frequency and severity of the sexual violence perpetrated by Israeli Security Forces, and linked this to an intent to humiliate and punish Palestinians.

Many detained victims by IDF forces were allegedly interrogated or abused while either naked or partially dressed, while blindfolded and made to kneel or had their hands tied behind their backs. Others were forced to strip in public and walk while being sexually harassed, at times in front of their family members who were forced to watch. While both genders were forced to do this, men and boys were reportedly targeted specifically. In June 2024, men detained at the Sde Teiman torture camp stated Israeli forces had inserted "hot metal sticks" and "electric sticks" into their rectums, resulting in the death of at least one man. Sexual abuse and torture leading to death is also suspected in the case of Adnan al-Bursh, a Palestinian surgeon from Gaza who was arrested and killed in Israeli custody in the context of the war.

In June 2024, a Palestinian prisoner released from the Sde Teiman torture camp gave testimony that prisoners were raped by dogs.

In July 2024, Mohammed Arab, a journalist who was arrested in March while covering the Israeli siege of Al-Shifa Hospital, testified to his lawyer Khaled Mahajneh that he had witnessed systematic use of rape, sexual violence, torture and killing in the detention camp. One detainee "was completely stripped and electrocuted, his genitals were yanked". Arab also testified that Israeli guards sexually assaulted six prisoners with a stick in front of other detainees. As Mahajneh recounted: "When he talked about rapes, I asked him, 'Muhammad, you're a journalist, are you sure about this?'"..."But he said he saw it with his own eyes, and that what he was telling me was only a small part of what was happening there."

In early August, Ibrahim Salem, who appeared in one of the first leaked photos from Sde Teiman, was released after being held there for 52 days without charge. He reported widespread torture, including by medical staff, as well as electrocution during interrogations, sexual abuse, constant beatings, forced stripping, genital grabbing, and frequent occurrences of rape committed by both male and female soldiers. Children were also subjected to rape. In one instance, a prisoner in his 40s was handcuffed and forced to bend over a desk while a female soldier inserted her fingers and other objects into his rectum. If the prisoner moved, a male soldier positioned in front of him would beat him and compel him to remain in that position. According to Salem, "Most of the prisoners will come out with rectal injuries [caused by the sexual assault]." In an interview with CNN, Salem stated that Palestinians were transported "like animals" to Israeli prisons on trucks, and described being hit in the genitals with metal detectors, as well as raped with a baton. Salem stated, "You’re exposing your body to male and female soldiers who harass you and touch you with objects on your sensitive parts. They hit you on your butt, pull you by the hair, call you obscenities".

On 5 August 2024, B'Tselem released a report on systematic Israeli abuse, torture, sexual violence and rape of Palestinian detainees: "Welcome to Hell: The Israeli Prison System as a Network of Torture Camps". The report includes extensive testimonies from Palestinians. The Guardian also interviewed Palestinian detainees, and reported they "back up [the] report by rights group B’Tselem, which says jails should now be labelled ‘torture camps’." The report includes a testimony of a Palestinian former detainee from Hebron, in the occupied West Bank, identified as "A. H.", who describes an attempt by Israeli guards to rape him with a carrot. B'Tselemen introduces the testimony by noting that similar incidents were reported by other Palestinian detainees.

Testimony from released Palestinian detainees collected by Channel 4 found "shocking allegations of physical, psychological and sexual abuse" committed by Israeli forces. In one testimony, a Palestinian victim of sexual violence recounts: "When the female soldier grabbed me by the balls and penis, she wounded me with her nails, digging them into my penis. I started screaming and biting the wire."

Walid Khalili, a paramedic and ambulance driver with the Palestinian Medical Relief Society who was detained in Sde Teiman, described severe mistreatment by Israeli soldiers. Detainees were forced to wear diapers, suspended from chains attached to metal handcuffs, and subjected to beatings. Khalili reported enduring electric shocks every other day, stress positions, cold water dousing, and torture during interrogations. He also received no medical care despite having broken ribs, witnessed a detainee's leg being amputated due to shackling, and saw another detainee die from what appeared to be cardiac arrest. After 20 days, Israeli forces transferred Khalili to a detention facility he identified as "al-Naqab" prison. During the transfer, he was cuffed, blindfolded, and said that soldiers threatened him with rape. At al-Naqab, Khalili encountered other sick and wounded detainees, including a man who was visibly "bleeding from his bottom". The man confided in Khalili, stating that before his detention, "three soldiers took turns raping him with an M16 [assault rifle]. No one else knew, but he told me as a paramedic. He was terrified. His mental health was awful, he started talking to himself."

In October 2024, a UN commission stated that it had found thousands of adults and children detained in Gaza had been subjected to "widespread and systematic abuse, physical and psychological violence, and sexual and gender-based violence." It described instances of rape and abuse of male prisoners by Israeli Security Forces, and asserted that such violence was institutionalized by Israel's National Security Minister Itamar Ben Gvir.

Middle East Research and Information Project, in its October 2024 article "Israel Is Waging War on Palestinian Prisoners," published that torture and sexual violence in Israeli prisons are "systematic" and that there is "plentiful accounts and abundant material evidence of systematic rape, torture and murder of Palestinian prisoners".

In November 2024, Mohammed Arab, an Al-Araby TV correspondent detained in Ofer Prison after being transferred from Sde Teiman, detailed instances of sexual torture committed by Israeli guards, including prisoners being raped by dogs and hit on their genitals with electrical batons. In another instance, a prisoner was raped with the fire nozzle of a fire extinguisher, with guards emptying it inside him until he lost consciousness.

In January 2025, Israel refused a UN request from Pramila Patten, the UN's Special Representative of the Secretary-General on Sexual Violence in Conflict, to investigate reports of sexual violence by Israeli soldiers towards Palestinians in detention. Patten's office stated that they were told this refusal could lead to Israel being included in the UN's list of entities responsible for sexual violence in conflicts. Israeli women's rights groups shared the same concern.

In March 2025, a nurse who used to work at Al-Shifa hospital and was detained by Israeli forces in November 2023 testified at a UN public hearing about the treatment he suffered for months at the hands of Israeli officers. During his detention, he said he was forced to strip naked and was subjected to beatings and threats of rape. During an interrogation in January 2024, he was struck all over his body, including his genitals, and as a result, "I was bleeding everywhere, I was bleeding from my penis, I was bleeding from my anus."

Also in March 2025, a UN report from the Commission of Inquiry on the Occupied Palestinian Territory accused the IDF of using sexual violence as a "method of war", stating that “Sexual and gender-based violence, including rape and violence to the genitals, were committed either under explicit orders or with implicit encouragement by Israel’s top civilian and military leadership”. The Commission stated that sexual assault, sexual harassment and forced public stripping and nudity were “standard operating procedure” of the Israeli Security Forces toward Palestinians.

The report also noted that Israeli soldiers photograph and disseminate online the abuses they commit against Palestinian men and boys "to punish, humiliate and intimidate [them] into subjugation."

Reports from Save the Children spanning 2020, 2023, and 2025 documented recurring patterns of abuse in Israeli military detention, including solitary confinement, denial of family contact and healthcare, beatings, strip searches, and genital violence. A 2025 assessment documented extensive exposure to abuse among child detainees, indicating that more than half of 165 children aged 12-17 at the time of detention reported witnessing or experiencing sexual violence, including forced stripping, genital assault, and rape threats. Documented long-term impacts among released children include severe psychological distress, panic attacks, emotional numbness, intentional self-harm (reported by 20%), and severe educational disruption, with 45% failing to return to school.

In October 2025, five Israeli human rights groups (the Public Committee Against Torture in Israel, Parents Against Child Detention, HaMoked, Adalah, and Physicians for Human Rights–Israel) submitted a report to the United Nations Committee against Torture with evidence that Israel had "dismantled existing safeguards and now employs torture throughout the entire detention process" with the knowledge or acquiescence of senior officials. An opinion poll conducted by the Israel Democracy Institute found that a majority of the Israeli public opposed criminal investigations into soldiers accused of abusing Palestinian detainees from Gaza.

In December 2025, two former Palestinian prisoners detailed testimonies of torture and sexual abuse. Sami al-Saei, a journalist detained without charge under Israel's administrative detention system for 16 months, told the BBC that he was sexually assaulted by prison guards while held in Megiddo prison in March 2024. He stated that guards partially stripped him, raped him with multiple objects, and physically assaulted him while mocking and threatening him, including making references to sexually abusing his family members. Al-Saei said the assault lasted more than 20 minutes, that guards laughed during the attack, and that one appeared to be filming before being told to stop. After the assault, he was transferred to an overcrowded cell where he received no medical treatment, using toilet paper to stop the bleeding. He reported bleeding from his rectum for more than three weeks afterwards. Al-Saei stated that other detainees told him such assaults were common and referred to by prisoners as a "reception party" inflicted upon arrival; he later observed evidence that many other prisoners had been sexually assaulted. Another former detainee described being stripped naked, beaten, and sexually humiliated by guards during his detention in early 2024, who used a military dog to rape him days before his release.

In January 2026, B'Tselem detailed the case of Tamer Qarmut, a 41-year-old man detained by Israeli soldiers during a raid on the Kamal Adwan hospital in November 2023, where his family had been sheltering. Qarmut said that during his first 24 hours in detention he was accused of being a militant despite being disabled, beating severely resulting in permanent hearing damage, attacked by a dog, and raped by a soldier. He stated that a soldier forcibly inserted a wooden stick into his anus multiple times, forcing him to lick it after removing it. Qarmut was held for almost two years without charge or trial, before being released in October 2025.

On 13 March 2026, a 29-year-old man named Suhaib Abu Kbash told to Reuters that he was sexually assaulted during a raid in Humsah in the West Bank by dozens of armed Israeli settlers. According to Kbash, the settlers tied his genitalia with zip ties, stripped him naked and forced him to parade in front of his family.

=== Allegations of sexual violence as Israeli policy ===
Euro-Mediterranean Human Rights Monitor has characterised the systematic pattern of sexual violence, with IDF soldiers openly filming these violations, as "organised state policy".

In May 2026, New York Times journalist Nicholas Kristof reported a "pattern of widespread Israeli sexual violence against men, women and even children", writing that while there is no evidence of explicit orders of rape from top Israeli leadership, they constructed a security apparatus where sexual violence has become "standard operating procedures". In the same piece, Sari Bashi, executive director of the Public Committee Against Torture in Israel, is cited saying “I don't see evidence that it has been ordered. But there's persistent evidence that the authorities know it's happening and are not stopping it.”

Abdul Fattah Elwi, a Palestinian psychiatrist who had treated four patients who had been raped in Israeli prison said that that Israel had used these horrific tactics to inflict psychological terror not only on prisoners but on the wider Palestinian population.

=== Use of dogs ===
Allegations of canine rape of Palestinians in Israeli custody have been recorded. An 89-minute documentary published by Al-Jazeera Investigations in October 2024 reported that a Palestinian detainee said he "saw guards using a dog to rape a young male inmate" at Sde Teiman. A November 2025 report from the Palestinian Centre for Human Rights included testimonies from Palestinians from Gaza who said they had been subject to canine rape in Israeli custody. In December 2025, Middle East Eye also reported an account of canine rape from a former Palestinian detainee speaking on the condition of anonymity.

In May 2026, Nicholas Kristof reported in his column "The Silence That Meets the Rape of Palestinians" in The New York Times that a journalist detained by Israel in Gaza in 2024 said that, while stripped naked, handcuffed, and blindfolded, he had been raped by a dog "with encouragement from a handler in Hebrew". Kristof wrote that there had been other reports from Palestinian prisoners and human rights groups that police dogs have been trained to rape prisoners.

=== Leaked video of gang rape ===
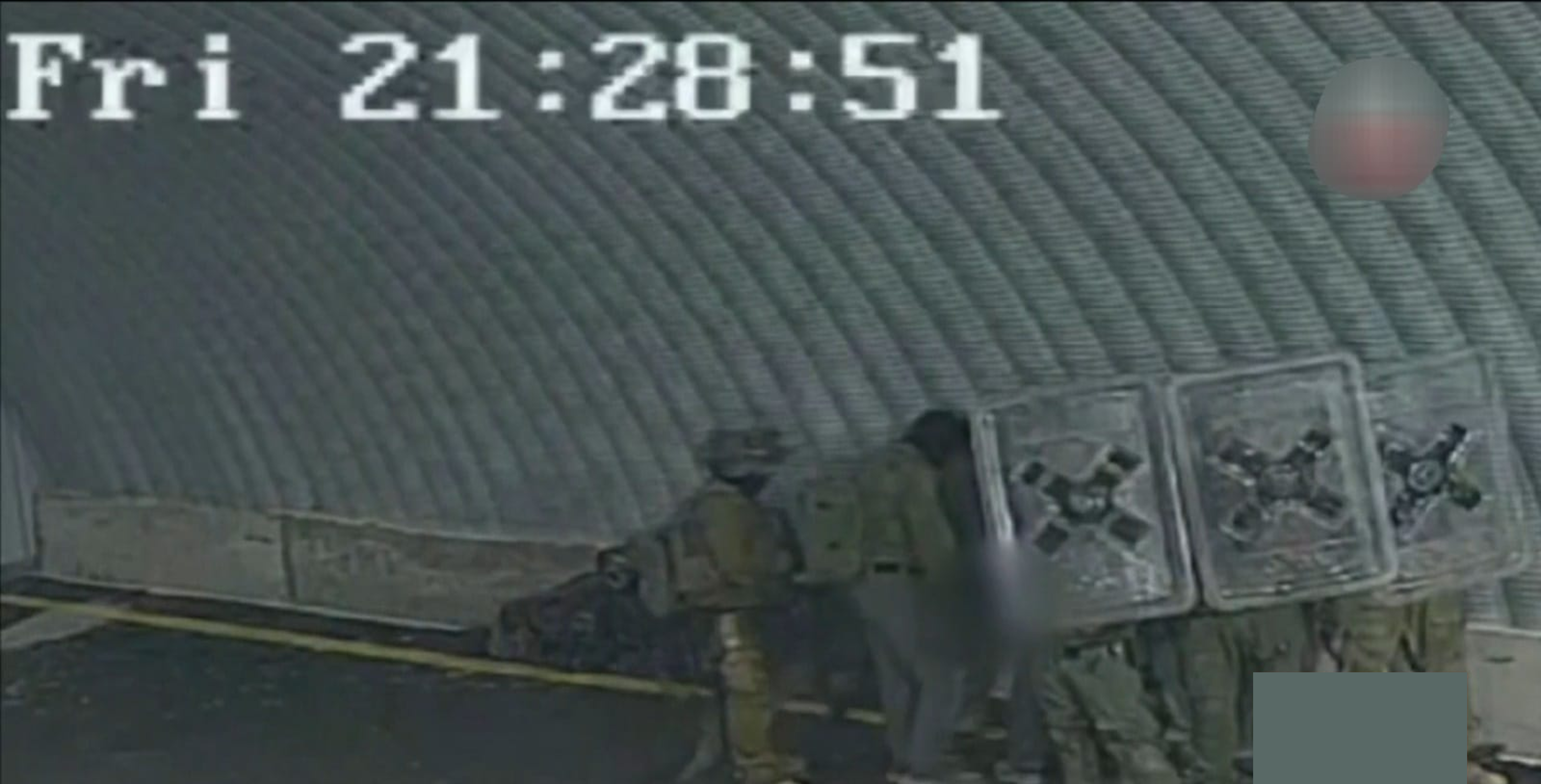
Image taken from CCTV footage of alleged Sde Teiman gang rape investigation sexual assault against a Palestinian prisoner at Sde Teiman detention camp

In late July 2024, a Palestinian prisoner in the Sde Teiman detention camp operated by Israeli military forces in the Negev desert near the border with the Gaza Strip was hospitalised with a ruptured bowel and a severe injury to his anus. He had also suffered from lung damage and broken ribs. Yoel Donchin, a doctor at Sde Teiman who treated the raped detainee, reported that the prisoner sustained "a ruptured bowel, severe injuries to his anus, lung damage, and broken ribs".

Subsequently, nine Israeli reservists, including a major, were arrested on suspicion they had sodomized him and suspicion of mistreating the detainee. Protestors, including Knesset members and government ministers, broke into the base where the reservists were being detained, demanding their release.

=== Sniping of teenage boys in the genitals ===
In July 2025, British surgeon Nick Maynard, who served in Gaza for many years before and during the 2023–2025 Israeli attacks, accused Israeli snipers of using Palestinian civilians as target practice, noting that the areas of the body targeted by the snipers varied from day to day, as if there were a game behind the conduct. On one particular day, Maynard said, "four young teenage boys came in, all of whom had been shot in the testicles and deliberately so. This is not coincidental. The clustering was far too obvious to be coincidental, and it seemed to us like this was almost like a game of target practice."

In August 2025, ABC News reported that in June 2025, two Palestinian teenage boys were taken by Israeli forces while walking to an aid distribution site in southern Gaza. According to the boys, they were sexually abused inside an unknown Israeli prison. One of them, a 17-year-old, stated that:

The Israeli women soldiers beat us. They stripped us and 'played' here and here and there (his genitals). They beat us with sticks. Got on us while we were lying on the ground. We were handcuffed like that and naked.

== Execution of women in Gaza ==
In January 2024, a United Nations Women report stated that two mothers were killed every hour by Israeli forces in Gaza. On 19 February 2024, a group of United Nations special rapporteurs issued a report regarding accounts that Palestinian women and children were "arbitrarily" targeted and killed in Gaza. Some were killed while holding white pieces of cloth, seeking refuge or fleeing.

== Sexual abuse in the Gaza Strip ==
In May 2024, a group of UN special rapporteurs condemned "unacceptable" sexual violence and enforced disappearances of women and children in Gaza, stating, "We are appalled that women are being targeted by Israel with such vicious, indiscriminate and disproportionate attacks".

=== Threats of rape and sexual violence ===
Palestinian women in Gaza have alleged threats of rape and sexual violence by invading Israeli soldiers. Speaking to Euro-Mediterranean Human Rights Monitor, one Palestinian woman, who was pregnant, described being forced to undress by an Israeli soldier, who threatened to rape her.

Multiple Palestinian prisoners reported threats of rape following the outbreak of the war. One such woman, the journalist Lama Khater, reported threats of rape against female prisoners including herself: "They threatened to rape me... It was clear the goal was to intimidate me." Israel denied the allegations and threatened to prosecute her lawyer for incitement. Another released Palestinian female prisoner made similar allegations.

In June 2025, several photos circulated in social media of allegedly showing coffee bags that were sent to IDF soldiers containing a message in Hebrew telling them to rape Palestinians 'with a rusty iron bar until there is blood coming.' The photos garnered support from Israelis online.

== Settler violence and displacement in the West Bank ==
In the occupied West Bank, acts perpetrated by Israeli settlers, including rape threats, genital exposure, attempts to touch women's bodies, and stalking women on their way to latrines, have been documented as part of wider intimidation campaigns driving displacement. Fear of sexual and gender-based violence has restricted women and girls from public life, with some families resorting to early marriage out of safety concerns. A survey of 39 displaced households in Area C of the West Bank found that over 70% identified threats of sexualized violence against women and children as a decisive factor forcing their displacement, contributing to a coercive environment amounting to forcible transfer under international humanitarian law.

== Destruction of reproductive rights ==
In its March 2025 report on sexual and gender-based violence against the Palestinian people, the UN Human Rights Commission also examined Israeli attacks on medical facilities in the Gaza Strip, focusing in particular on an Israeli bombing in Gaza City in December 2023 against Al-Basma IVF Centre, the territory’s main in vitro fertilisation clinic. The commission concluded from a visual analysis of photos of the damage that the attack was consistent with Israeli artillery fire and that it was carried out intentionally. More than 4,000 embryos were destroyed in the bombing, as well as 1,000 sperm and egg samples. The report found that the attack amounted to "two categories of genocidal acts in the Rome Statute and the Genocide Convention, including deliberately inflicting conditions of life calculated to bring about the physical destruction of Palestinians and imposing measures intended to prevent births." Another form of attack on reproductive rights, listed by the Commission among the genocidal acts committed by Israel against the Palestinian people, is the blocking of medication for pregnancy, deliveries and neonatal care from the Gaza Strip.

== Coverage in media ==
=== Social media posts by IDF members ===
Videos and pictures of Israeli soldiers going through Palestinian women's underwear in Gaza went viral, leading MIFTAH, a Palestinian women's advocacy organization, to state they showed "depravity". In one video, an IDF soldier records himself going through a Palestinian woman's wardrobe, including her underwear while making derogatory and sexist remarks about Arab women. Another image shows two male IDF troops, one wearing a Palestinian woman's bra while the other stands next to him groping the empty bra and sticking his tongue out, while another male IDF soldier is recorded detailing how he intends to bring back Palestinian women's belongings back to his girlfriend in Israel. A video was posted by an IDF soldier showing him sitting on top of a tank holding a female mannequin dressed in a black bra and helmet, stating "I found a beautiful wife, serious relationship in Gaza, great woman."

A UN Human Rights Office spokesperson, Ravina Shamdasani, called the postings "...demeaning to Palestinian women, and all women." An assistant professor of law at Queen's University in Canada stated the posts violated article 27 of the Fourth Geneva Convention which states all civilians are entitled to respect with women being especially protected against any attack on their honour.

=== False report allegation ===
On 24 March 2024, Al Jazeera reported in its live blog on an allegation against the IDF of committing rape at Al-Shifa Hospital. The story was based on a testimony from Jamila al-Hissi (also transliterated as Jamila Al-Hessi), a Gazan woman, who said she had seen IDF soldiers "raping women then killing them and burning entire families alive." These reports quickly gained international attention and provoked widespread condemnation. However, it was subsequently reported that an investigation by Hamas determined that her allegations were false. Yasser Abuhilalah, a columnist and former director at Al Jazeera, said on social media that Hamas had found her allegation to be baseless. He added that "the woman who spoke about rape justified her exaggeration and incorrect talk by saying that the goal was to arouse the nation’s fervor and brotherhood." In response the next day Al Jazeera first removed its video and later the content on its live blog.

== International reactions ==
In response to the UN report, a spokesman for the U.S. Department of State said, "Civilians and detainees must be treated humanely, and in accordance with international humanitarian law." The Palestinian Prisoner's Society has repeatedly stated that Palestinian men and women have been subjected to severe sexual assault, including attempted rape and violating strip searches. It cited video and dozens of testimonies documented by rights groups such as B'Tselem.

On 8 August 2024, the US and European Union denounced alleged sexual abuse and torture of Palestinian prisoners by Israeli troops. “The EU is gravely concerned by the allegations of human rights violations and abuses, including torture and sexual abuse of Palestinian detainees at the Sde Teiman military facility in Israel and elsewhere,” said Peter Stano, a spokesperson for the bloc’s diplomatic service. He also called on Israel to allow Red Cross humanitarian workers to visit prisons where Palestinians are held.

Regarding domestic enforcement, historical data from the Israeli military law enforcement system indicates that between 2017 and 2021, only 11 out of 1,260 complaints (0.87%) filed regarding alleged offenses against Palestinians resulted in indictments. While the International Committee of the Red Cross was barred from visiting Palestinian prisoners following October 2023, Israel's Supreme Court ruled in June 2026 that the prohibition must be revoked, though visits faced continued delays in resuming.

U.S. State Department spokesman Matthew Miller said on August 7: "We have seen the video, and reports of sexual abuse of detainees are horrific. There ought to be zero tolerance for sexual abuse, rape of any detainee, period." Miller further called on Israel to conduct a "swift" and "full" investigation of itself. Philip H. Gordon, the National Security Adviser to the U.S. vice president, called for an investigation of abuse in Israeli prisons, stating, "Perpetrators of sexual violence everywhere must be held to account".

The US said it could not independently confirm earlier reports of sexual abuse in the UN report from February, and Israel criticized the report as biased. Israel alleged that one of the report’s authors had rhetorically legitimized Hamas’s 7 October attack a few days prior to the UN panel, and that another had "publicly doubted the testimonies of Israeli victims of gender-based and sexual violence." The Israeli mission to the United Nations in Geneva, Switzerland stated that "Israel forcefully rejects the despicable and unfounded claims published today by a group of so-called U.N. experts".

In May 2026, the United Nations added Israel to its blacklist of parties suspected of committing conflict-related sexual violence. A UN report documented cases involving Palestinian detainees including women and children from Gaza and the West Bank between 2023 and 2025, including rape, gang rape, sexual torture, genital abuse, forced nudity, and degrading strip searches allegedly committed by Israeli armed and security forces during detention and interrogation. The report said investigators faced access restrictions that prevented the UN from fully assessing the scale of the alleged abuses. Following the decision, Israel condemned the report as politically motivated and announced it would sever ties with UN Secretary-General António Guterres’ office.

In an opinion piece in The New Arab, Maryam Aldossari criticized Western feminists' ignoring of Israel's sexual violence against Palestinians, stating, "Remaining silent on one of the worst atrocities against women and children in our lifetime is indefensible." Alice Jill Edwards, the U.N. special rapporteur on torture, condemned the alleged sexual abuse of detainees at Sde Teiman detention camp, stating, "There are no circumstances in which sexual torture or sexualised inhuman and degrading treatment can be justified".

== See also ==
- Human rights violations against Palestinians by Israel
- Mass detentions in the Gaza war
- Sexual and gender-based violence in the October 7 attacks
- Summary executions during the Gaza war
- Torture during the Gaza war
- War crimes in the Gaza war
- Women in the Gaza war
- Zionist political violence
