= Sde Teiman =

Israeli military base detaining Palestinians

- Blindfolded Palestinian detainees inside the camp in May 2024

- Location within Israel
- Location: Negev desert, Israel; 31°16′24″N 34°42′28″E
- Status: Operational
- Opened: 1 December 2023; 2 years ago
- Managed by: Israeli military

Sde Teiman (Hebrew: שדה תימן) is an Israeli military base located in the Negev desert near the border with the Gaza Strip. During the Gaza war, it gained international attention for systemic human rights violations against its Palestinian detainees from the strip.

Multiple released Palestinian detainees have testified they and others, including children, were subjected to rape, gang-rape, other forms of sexual violence as well as psychological and physical torture by both male and female Israeli soldiers and medical staff. Multiple reports also speak of prisoners who suffered from medical neglect for injuries sustained, which led to cases of arm and leg amputations. Their testimonies have been corroborated by whistleblowing Israeli staff and a CNN investigation. The mistreated detainees also included Palestinian healthcare workers who had been captured during Israeli raids on Gaza's hospitals.

In one highly publicized incident, leaked CCTV footage showed Israeli soldiers gang raping a Palestinian detainee with a metal rod that caused him serious injuries to his anus and lungs. The leak occurred a few weeks after several soldiers suspected of the abuse of a prisoner were detained for questioning, leading to "right to rape" protests by Israeli right-wing activists and parliamentarians breaking into the camp in late July 2024. One of the soldiers received a prison sentence and five more were indicted for abuse in February 2025. On 12 March 2026, the IDF dropped sexual assault charges against the five Israeli soldiers accused of raping a Palestinian detainee on the grounds that the defendants' right to a fair trial had been breached.

== Background ==
The military base was partially converted into a detention camp in the wake of the passing of the Unlawful Combatants Law by the Knesset in December 2023. It is divided into an enclosure where up to 200 detainees are kept blindfolded and handcuffed in cages, and a field hospital of tents where dozens of handcuffed prisoners are kept. The law allows the Israel Defense Forces to detain people without an arrest warrant for 45 days, after which the detainees must be transferred to the Israel Prison Service. As of 10 May 2024, the IDF has acknowledged two similar camps: Ofer Prison and a prison in Anatot, both in the West Bank. Sde Teiman is divided into two sections: enclosures and a field hospital. An additional structure exists where interrogations take place. Since its establishment, thousands of Israeli soldiers, both regulars and reservists, have served as guards there.

All Gazans detained by Israel since the 2023 Hamas-led attack on Israel are classified as unlawful combatants rather than prisoners of war, which excludes them from rights like access to a lawyer. Most detainees, in lieu of evidence that they are members of Hamas, are kept as suspects, without charges laid. This classification is applied to all Gazans detained by Israel since October 2023, which The Guardian reported to be 849 people as of April 2024. A doctor working at Sde Teiman stated that he didn't know why many of the prisoners he encountered had been detained by Israel; among those he treated were a paraplegic, a man weighing 300 pounds (140 kg), and another who, since childhood, has had to breathe with the assistance of a tube in his neck.

In December 2023, Haaretz reported that hundreds of Palestinians from Gaza were being detained in Sde Teiman and that some of them had died for unknown reasons. The detainees were interrogated, blindfolded, and handcuffed, while the lights were kept on at all times.

On 7 March 2024, Haaretz reported that 27 prisoners from Gaza had died in Israeli custody since the beginning of the Gaza war, including some from Sde Teiman. In May, prison officials told The New York Times that some 4,000 Gazans have been detained at Sde Teiman since October 2023. Of these, 70% had been detained for further investigation, 1200 had been repatriated to Gaza, and 35 had died.

In October 2024, The Guardian reported that officials from the US' main humanitarian agency, USAID, attend regular meetings at Sde Teiman. Starting in July 2024, Israel created a "Joint Coordination Board" for approving aid operations into Gaza, a body that meets at Sde Teiman and coordinates with US officials there. In an internal USAID document viewed by The Guardian, the "base's name links to its Wikipedia entry, which features photos of blindfolded Palestinian prisoners and details their mistreatment."

== Abuse of detainees ==
=== Torture ===
An Amnesty International report released in July 2024 included accounts of abuse from Sde Teiman detainees that were consistent with earlier reports. Amnesty interviewed a 14-year-old child who stated that interrogators had beaten him, burned him with cigarettes, and kept him blindfolded and handcuffed.

In May 2024, three anonymous Israeli employees of the camp spoke to CNN as whistleblowers, during which they corroborated and expanded upon reports of abuse and poor conditions revealed by multiple detainees who were later released. The whistleblowers detailed enclosures where detainees are blindfolded and not allowed to speak or move. Images leaked to CNN show rows of men wearing gray tracksuits with blindfolds, each sitting on an exceptionally thin mattress, surrounded by a barbed-wire fence.

Punishments include beatings and for prisoners to raise their hands in a stress position, sometimes zip-tied to a fence, for upwards of an hour. In what one released detainee called "the nightly torture," guards would conduct routine searches with dogs and sound grenades while prisoners were sleeping. The detainees are reportedly kept on a diet of one cucumber, some slices of bread and a cup of cheese a day.

As part of the October 2025 Gaza war ceasefire, Israel returned 135 bodies of Palestinians from Sde Teiman to Gaza. According to doctors in Khan Yunis, forensic examinations "indicate that Israel carried out acts of murder, summary executions and systematic torture against many of the Palestinians", and showed "signs of direct gunfire at point-blank range and bodies crushed beneath Israeli tank tracks." Some of the dead were blindfolded, their hands tied behind their backs, photos showed. In one, a rope was tied around a man’s neck.

The body of Mahmoud Ismail Shabat, 34, showed marks on his neck of hanging, with indications he was injured or killed in Gaza and later taken to Sde Teiman. A detainee’s hand had been amputated "because the wrists had become gangrenous due to handcuffing wounds," a whistleblower said.

Shadi Abu Seido, a Palestinian journalist from Gaza, told TRT: "They stripped me completely naked for 10 hours in the cold. I was then transferred to Sde Teiman and held there for 100 days, during which I remained handcuffed and blindfolded. Many died in detention, others lost their minds. Some had limbs amputated. They suffered sexual and physical abuse. They brought dogs that urinated on us. When I asked why I had been arrested, they answered: 'We have killed all the journalists. They died once. But we brought you here and you will die hundreds of times.'"

=== Sexual abuse and rape ===
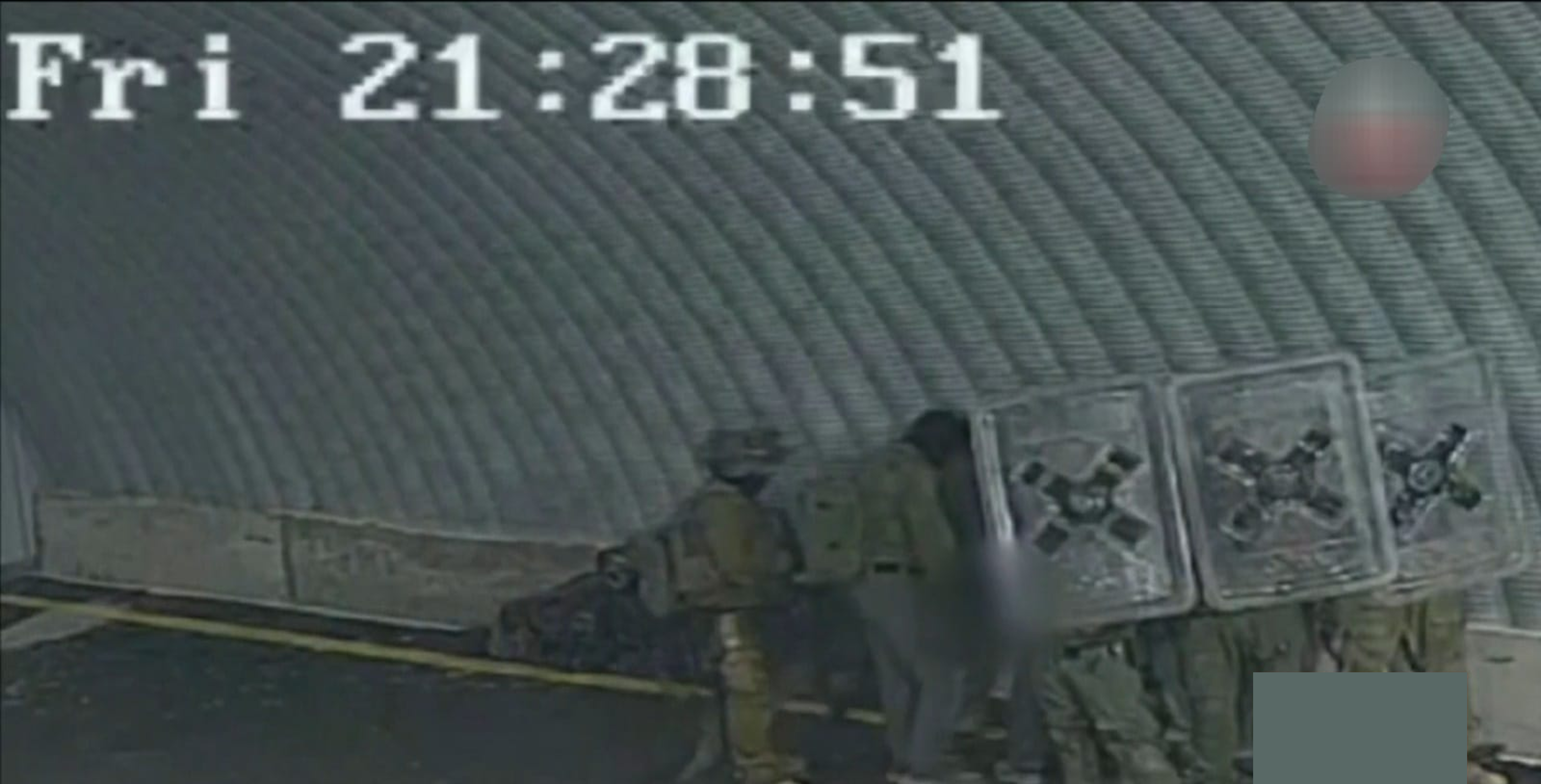
Image taken from CCTV footage of alleged sexual assault against a Palestinian prisoner at Sde Teiman leaked by Yifat Tomer-Yerushalmi and broadcast on Channel 12, an Israeli television station.

Several Palestinian prisoners since returned to Gaza reported to UNWRA and the New York Times that a metal stick was used to inflict injury by penetrating the anus of detainees under interrogation and multiple prisoners reported the use of electric shocks, sometimes being forced to "sit in a chair wired with electricity".

On 29 July 2024, the Israeli military police detained nine Israeli soldiers for questioning as part of an investigation of a suspected abuse of a Palestinian prisoner, whom The Times of Israel reported "signs of serious abuse, including to his anus". In response, far-right politicians, including Heritage Minister Amichay Eliyahu and Knesset Member Zvi Sukkot urged their supporters to protest at Sde Teiman against the nine soldiers' detention. Sukkot, Eliyahu, and Knesset Member Nissim Vaturi joined other right-wingers in illegally breaking into Sde Teiman, while hours later the Israeli military's Beit Lid base was also broken into by far-right activists as the nine soldiers were being detained there.

Various right-wing politicians have condemned the Israeli soldiers' detention: Justice Minister Yariv Levin said that "harsh pictures of soldiers being arrested" were "impossible to accept"; National Security Minister Itamar Ben-Gvir said that the soldiers' detention was "shameful" and asked for "the military authorities to back the fighters ... Soldiers need to have our full support"; Economy Minister Nir Barkat declared: "I support our fighters", while criticizing the events as a "show trial"; Transportation Minister Miri Regev commented that the arrests of Israeli soldiers were "dangerous" during war, and warned against military prosecutions that were "appeasing our enemies". Separately, Knesset Member Hanoch Milwidsky argued in the Knesset that it is permissible to sexually abuse Hamas commandos of the Nukhba: "...everything is legitimate to do. Everything."

Ibrahim Salem, featured in one of the first photos leaked from the detention camp, was held there for 52 days without charge and released in early August 2024. He reported widespread torture, including by medical staff, as well as electrocution during interrogations, sexual abuse, constant beatings, forced stripping, genital grabbing, and frequent occurrences of rape and gang-rape committed by both male and female soldiers. Children were also subjected to rape. In one instance, a prisoner in his 40s was handcuffed and forced to bend over a desk while a female soldier inserted her fingers and other objects into his rectum. If the prisoner moved, a male soldier positioned in front of him would beat him and compel him to remain in that position. According to Salem, "Most of the prisoners will come out with rectal injuries [caused by the gang-rape]." A doctor at Sde Teiman who examined a detainee who suffered sexual abuse stated, "I couldn't believe an Israeli prison guard could do such a thing". A surveillance video leaked in August 2024 apparently showed Israeli soldiers sexually assaulting a detainee.

Walid Khalili, a Palestinian Medical Relief Society paramedic and ambulance driver detained in Sde Teiman for 20 days without charge, described severe mistreatment by Israeli soldiers. Transferred from Tel al-Hawa to the detention camp, he was forced to wear a diaper and placed in a large warehouse-like building with chains hanging from the ceiling. Detainees, also in diapers, were suspended from chains attached to metal handcuffs. Khalili described being chained, electrocuted while wearing a garment and headband connected to wires, and subjected to beatings. He recounted, "The world was spinning around, and I fainted. They hit me with batons... With every question I was electro-shocked to wake me up. He told me confess and we will stop torturing you." He endured electric shocks every other day, stress positions, and cold water dousing. Before interrogations, he was given an unknown drug that caused hallucinations and disorientation. He reported that an interrogator fluent in Arabic questioned him about hostages, threatened harm to his family if he did not confess, and "told me how many children I have, all their names, my address." He received no medical care despite having broken ribs, witnessed a detainee's leg being amputated due to shackling, and saw another detainee die from what appeared to be cardiac arrest.

=== Use of dogs ===
The PCHR has documented the use of dogs by the Israelis to rape prisoners, what it calls "one of the most heinous crimes that can be committed against human beings and their dignity". One prisoner at the Sde Teiman torture camp told the PHCR that “We were stripped completely. Soldiers brought dogs that climbed on us and urinated on me. Then one of the dogs raped me – the dog... inserted its penis into my anus".

In June 2024, a Palestinian prisoner released from Sde Teiman gave testimony that prisoners were raped by dogs.

=== Healthcare workers ===
Palestinian healthcare workers in the Gaza Strip had been arbitrarily detained by the Israeli military during their raids on hospitals during the war, and transferred to detention centers in Israel's south, including Sde Teiman. Human Rights Watch has documented several of these cases, in which detained health workers were beaten, stripped, handcuffed weeks on end, and subject to torture and sexual violence, as well as threats of rape and killing of their Gaza family members.

=== Lawyer visits ===
Khaled Mahajneh, a lawyer who visited the detention center, stated that the conditions were "more horrific than anything we've heard about Abu Ghraib and Guantanamo." He stated that he went to the detention center seeking information on a reporter named Muhammad Arab from Al Araby TV who had been detained while covering the Al-Shifa Hospital siege. Khaled described the reporter as being "unrecongnizable", and said that he had testified of prisoners being routinely abused, of guards openly sexually assaulting prisoners, and of multiple prisoners having died from torture.

=== Field hospitals ===
In April 2024, Haaretz obtained a letter written by a doctor at a field hospital at Sde Teiman to Israel's attorney general, defense minister, and health minister. The doctor wrote that "inmates are fed through straws, defecate in diapers and are held [in] constant restraints, which violate medical ethics and the law." The doctor alleged that understaffing and inadequate care led to complications and deaths, describing amputations due to handcuff injuries as "routine." A separate medical source who visited Sde Teiman corroborated the letter to CNN. The source also characterized systemic dehumanizing of detainees, alleging that officials are told not to use prisoners' names but rather their serial numbers.

Whistleblowers to CNN echoed previous accounts of wounded detainees physically restrained to beds, wearing diapers, fed through straws, and blindfolded. They further alleged that medical procedures are frequently performed by underqualified employees, operations are often done without anesthesia, and patients are refused pain relievers. Some of the detainees were reportedly arrested in hospitals in Gaza while undergoing treatment. According to the whistleblowers, the medical team were told to not document treatments or sign papers, corroborating April 2024 reporting by Physicians for Human Rights in Israel that anonymity is employed to hinder potential investigation; during the 2024 New York Times visit, the newspaper noted that three doctors attributed their use of anonymity to fear of retribution from "Hamas and their allies". Whistleblowers further stated that patients were shackled to their beds and surgeries were performed without adequate painkillers.

=== Release of bodies ===
The October 2025 truce agreement between Israel and Hamas included the exchange of dead bodies.

Around 135 mutilated bodies of Palestinians returned by Israel to Gaza came from Sde Teiman. Some bodies were blindfolded, others had hands tied behind their backs, in one case a rope was tied around a man’s neck. There was evidence that many had been tortured before their deaths, many seem to have been executed.

Doctors reported that official examinations clearly showed that torture and summary executions take place against Palestinians in Israeli jails.

== Responses ==
=== Israel ===
In response to allegations made by the whistleblowers, the Israeli military stated that they treat detainees "appropriately and carefully," and that "incidents of unlawful handcuffing are not known to the authorities." Maj. Gen. Yifat Tomer-Yerushalmi, the military advocate-general, stated that military police investigations have been opened into allegations of misconduct at Sde Teiman.

On 23 May 2024, Israeli human rights groups petitioned the High Court of Justice to close the detention center at Sde Teiman. On 5 June, the Israeli government told the court that they were planning to transfer most prisoners out of Sde Teiman; Amnesty International noted in July that "little appears to have changed". In September 2024, the High Court declined to order the shutting of the detention center.

According to the Times of Israel, following the reports of abuse of detainees, on 25 May 2024, an unnamed female IDF soldier claimed women guards in Sde Teiman have been subjected to "some form of sexual harassment" from detainees, from allegedly blowing kisses their way and making suggestive remarks to spitting on the floor when they speak. According to Haaretz, citing testimony from Israeli guards at Sde Teiman, female guards made unfounded claims of sexual harassment resulting in torture, beatings and rape of detainees as punishment. Testimonies from Palestinian victims of sexual violence, rape, torture and genital mutilation also relate to female Israeli guards and soldiers engaging in such acts.

On 7 February 2025, an Israeli military court sentenced a male IDF reservist to seven months in prison after he pleaded guilty to three counts of aggravated abuse against Gazan prisoners and one of conduct unbecoming during a plea deal with prosecutors. These related to four incidents between January and June 2024 of punching detainees, using his weapon on restrained prisoners and forcing prisoners to say demeaning phrases and howl like dogs. The convicted soldier was also given a suspended sentence and demoted to the rank of private. On 19 February, Israeli prosecutors charged five IDF reservists with the severe abuse and alleged gang rape of a Palestinian prisoner on 5 July 2024. These defendants included a major, captain, sergeant major, sergeant first class and a corporal.

On 29 July 2024, demonstrators opposed to the charges stormed the Beit Lid army base in central Israel and demonstrated outside Tomer-Yerushalmi's house, calling her a "traitor." On 31 October 2025 she admitted leaking a video of the abuse in 2024 and resigned. On the night of 2 November she was reported missing, and, when found at a Tel Aviv beach, was arrested in suspicion of leaking the video.

On 12 March 2026, the IDF's Military Advocate General Maj. Gen. Itay Offir dropped the sexual assault charges against the five Israeli soldiers accused of raping a Palestinian detainee in 2024 on the grounds that their rights to a fair trial had been breached when his predecessor Tomer-Yerushalmi leaked footage of the alleged assault to the media. This announcement was welcomed by several right-wing Israeli figures including Prime Minister Benjamin Netanyahu, Defence Minister Israel Katz and Finance Minister Bezalel Smotrich as a vindication of the defendants and the IDF. By contrast, the dropping of the charges was condemned by the non-governmental organisation the Public Committee Against Torture in Israel and Hadash Ta'al Member of Knesset Aida Touma-Suleiman as a whitewash and a cover-up.

=== United States ===
US State Department spokesperson Matthew Miller called reports of sexual abuse of Palestinian detainees at Sde Teiman by Israeli soldiers to be "horrific" and called for a swift investigation and to hold those involved accountable. His 8 August 2024 statement added that "There ought to be zero tolerance of any sexual abuse, rape, of any detainees, period."

In October 2024, The Guardian revealed that the American aid agency USAID meets with its Israeli counterparts at Sde Teiman, starting at least in July 2024 with the creation of an Israeli "Joint Coordination Board" at the prison, tasked with overseeing all aid into Gaza.

=== United Nations ===
Alice Jill Edwards, United Nations Special Rapporteur on Torture and Unlawful Combatants, called for an investigation and later condemned the alleged sexual abuse as "particularly gruesome."

=== Other ===
The camp has been dubbed "Israel's Guantánamo Bay."

== See also ==
- Sde Teiman gang rape
- Camp 1391
- Human rights violations against Palestinians by Israel
- Mass detentions in the Gaza war
- Palestinian prisoners in Israel
- Torture during the Gaza war
- Abu Ghraib prison (2003–2006)
- Sednaya Prison in Syria, nicknamed the "Human Slaughterhouse"
- List of concentration and internment camps
