= Public Committee Against Torture in Israel =

Independent human rights organization

- Founded: 1990; 36 years ago
- Type: Non-governmental organisation
- Website: stoptorture.org.il/en/

The Public Committee Against Torture in Israel (PCATI; Hebrew: הוועד הציבורי נגד עינויים בישראל) is an Israeli non-governmental organisation that monitors the use of torture and ill-treatment by Israeli security services against those under detention. PCATI was founded in 1990 in reaction to what it described as "the ongoing policy of the Israeli government, which permitted the systematic use of torture and ill treatment in Shin Bet interrogations".

== Overview ==
PCATI monitors detention centers and advocates against the use of torture in interrogation in Israel using legal means, supporting relevant legislation and an information campaign aimed at raising public awareness of the subject. PCATI cooperates with other human rights organizations, Israeli, Palestinian and international, in its struggle against the use of torture in Israel and for the implementation of international law and international humanitarian law in Israeli law and practice.

PCATI is also engaged in outreach and education programs aimed at raising and engaging public discourse and consciousness regarding torture, impunity and related violations of human rights.

In December 1996, PCATI, together with the Palestinian Centre for Human Rights (PCHR), Gaza, received the 1996 French Republic Award on Human Rights from the President of France.

== Work ==
PCATI acts on behalf of all people—Israelis, Palestinians, labor immigrants and other foreigners residing in Israel and the Occupied Palestinian Territories—with the aim of protecting them from torture and ill-treatment by the Israeli security authorities.

=== Public Committee Against Torture in Israel v. Government of Israel (1999) ===
PCATI won a historic victory when, on 6 September 1999, the Israeli Supreme Court prohibited the use of various means of torture that were systematically employed by the Shin Bet until then. The action came in response to petitions of principle that PCATI began submitting to the court in 1991. The petitions were filed together with the Association for Civil Rights in Israel, Hamoked–Center for the Defense of the Individual and others. Following the decision, there was a significant decrease in the number of complaints regarding torture or the use of the harsh methods previously used.

However, following the onset of the Second Intifada in September 2000, there was, again, a sharp increase in the number of complaints of torture and ill treatment indicating a reversion to the methods prohibited by the Supreme Court. This resulted from the exploitation of "necessity defense" opening allowed by the Court in its ruling, or by altogether denying the fact that physical force was used in interrogation, which victims would find difficult to challenge. There was also a widening of the phenomenon of the ill treatment of Palestinian detainees by soldiers and other members of the security forces.

In light of this, PCATI expanded its activities and began employing field workers and external attorneys to assist the in-house staff in the investigation and treatment of cases of torture or cruel, inhuman or degrading treatment (CIDT). PCATI has, in addition continued to search for additional ways to combat torture, CIDT and related violations of human rights and particularly the issue of impunity, and to develop its legal and public advocacy methodology.

=== Public Committee Against Torture in Israel v. Government of Israel (2006) ===
In 2002, PCATI, together with the Palestinian Society for the Protection of Human Rights, brought the Israeli practice of "preventative targeted killings" to the Supreme Court of Israel. In the important case against the Israeli government, often cited in legal literature, the Supreme Court did not condemn the practice of "targeted killings" as illegal under International law, but concluded that the lawfulness should be examined after each case given the particular circumstances. The interpretation of the Court on "civilians who take direct part in hostilities" has been criticized in academic publications. Orna Ben-Naftali and Keren Michaeli conclude that "the court has, in effect, created a broad category of 'unlawful combatants' who are not entitled either to the privileges of combatants or to the immunities of civilians". They add that this decision by the Supreme Court would have contributed more to the international legal discourse if human rights law and the context of long-term occupation would have been applied.

=== Referral to the International Criminal Court (2022) ===
On 10 June 2022, PCATI said it was referring 17 cases to the International Criminal Court, having concluded that obtaining justice within the Israeli system was impossible.

=== Reports ===
In 2009, PCATI released a report titled "Shackling as a Form of Torture and Abuse" that accused Israel of torturing hundreds of Palestinian prisoners by shackling them in violation of international standards. The report also called into question Israel's refusal to allow the Red Cross to inspect Facility 1391, a secret prison which has been called Israel's "Guantanamo Bay".

The Public Committee against Torture in Israel conducts annual reports on the situation in Israel. In 2022, the report stated that since 2001, over 1400 complaints have been submitted to the Ministry of Justice, whereas supposedly only three investigations were opened. The reports are published in English, Hebrew and Arabic language.

=== Media coverage ===
PCATI is repeatedly referred to in various media. These include articles, about PCATI or with PCATI as a source, in the Israeli newspapers Haaretz, Times of Israel, the Jerusalem Post, +972 Magazine and the British BBC as well as The Guardian. On 20 September 2016, the pro-Israel organisation NGO Monitor called some of PCATI's allegations baseless, such as the 2013 claim that Israel placed Palestinian children (and adults) in iron cages. Since then, several news networks circulated this claim, including The Independent and Mondoweiss.

== See also ==
- Al-Haq
