= The Silence That Meets the Rape of Palestinians =

2026 opinion piece by Nicholas Kristof

"The Silence That Meets the Rape of Palestinians" is an opinion piece published in The New York Times on May 11, 2026, in which journalist Nicholas Kristof recounts interviews detailing widespread sexual abuse committed by Israeli prison guards, soldiers, settlers, and interrogators against Palestinians, especially those in Israeli custody. The premise of the article, which cites reports on sexual and gender-based violence against Palestinians during the Gaza war by the United Nations Commission on Human Rights, the Euro-Mediterranean Human Rights Monitor, the Committee to Protect Journalists, and B'Tselem, is that there is a disparity in how allegations of sexual violence are treated when the victims are Palestinian as opposed to when the victims are Israeli. Kristof relied on direct interviews with 14 Palestinians, including nonviolence activist Issa Amro and journalist Sami al-Sai, who reported having been sexually assaulted by Israeli settlers or members of Israeli forces.

The Israeli Ministry of Foreign Affairs called the article "Hamas propaganda" and "one of the worst blood libels ever to appear in the modern press" and Israeli Prime Minister Benjamin Netanyahu and Minister of Foreign Affairs Gideon Sa'ar announced legal action against The New York Times for libel. The Times said such legal action would be "without merit".

The piece elicited strong reactions from supporters of Israel. In response to critics of his piece, Kristof called on Israel to permit the Red Cross and lawyers to visit Palestinian detainees. Critics on the opposite side of the aisle also questioned why the story was published in the opinion section, arguing this constitutes a double standard with regard to coverage of the Israeli–Palestinian conflict in The New York Times, as articles alleging sexual abuse against Israelis haven been published in the news section. Others, including an executive director at Breaking the Silence, remark that the aggressive Israeli reaction is calculated as to deter further coverage of Israeli abuses.

On May 21, Kristof and NYT Opinion head Kathleen Kingsbury responded to questions regarding the article. The same day, the New York Times Opinion and The New York Times accounts on video-sharing networks posted a video with Kristof presenting material from his May 11 column, recordings of interviews with Palestinian survivors of sexual assault by Israelis, and videos and photos of Palestinians being subjected to sexual assault, one of which settlers posted to social media.

== Background ==
=== Sexual and gender-based violence against Palestinians during the Gaza war ===
Yuli Novak, Israeli human rights activist and executive director of B’Tselem, writes that "abuses in Israeli custody have long been reported by former detainees, lawyers, doctors and journalists, and documented by human rights organizations." In 2025, the United Nations Human Rights Council published "More than a human can bear": Israel's systematic use of sexual, reproductive and other forms of gender-based violence since 7 October 2023, which described sexual violence against Palestinians as "standard operating procedures" and "a major element in the ill treatment of Palestinians." In 2025, too, there was media coverage of Yifat Tomer-Yerushalmi's resignation and arrest after leaking CCTV footage of sexual assault against a Palestinian prisoner at Sde Teiman detention camp, which was shown on Israeli television on Channel 12. In April 2026, Euro-Mediterranean Human Rights Monitor published a report entitled Another genocide behind walls: Sexual violence in Israeli prisons and detention centres and engineered impunity documenting sexual and gender-based violence against Palestinians during the Gaza war. The January 2026 report Living Hell: The Israeli Prison System as a Network of Torture Camps from B'Tselem also documented sexual violence as a torture method used against Palestinians in Israeli custody.

== Content ==
External videos
- May 21 video shared by NYT and NYT Opinion based on Kristof's May 11 column
- The Horror of Sexual Assault in Israeli Prisons on YouTube

Kristof writes that there is a disparity in how allegations of sexual violence are treated when the victims are Palestinian as opposed to when the victims are Israeli, and that there shouldn't be. He opens the piece with: "It’s a simple proposition: Whatever our views of the Middle East conflict, we should be able to unite in condemning rape."

=== Sourcing ===
In his opinion piece, Kristof cited previous reports of sexual and gender-based violence against Palestinians during the Gaza war, including the 2025 report from the United Nations Human Rights Council, the April 2026 report from Euro-Mediterranean Human Rights Monitor, the January 2026 B'Tselem report, and the February 2026 Committee to Protect Journalists report.

Kristof wrote that, "this article is based on conversations with 14 men and women who said they had been sexually assaulted by Israeli settlers or members of the security forces", and that he had also spoken to family members, investigators, officials and others." Among the witnesses who agreed to be named were Sami al-Sai, a freelance journalist; Issa Amro, a Palestinian nonviolent activist; Suhaib Abualkebash, a farmer in the Jordan Valley; and Mohammad Matar, a Palestinian official.

Kristof wrote that Issa Amro told him "he had been sexually assaulted by Israeli soldiers and that he believed this was common but underreported because of shame." He also shared the testimony of Sami al-Sai, a Palestinian reporter who described experiencing sexual assault from a group of Israeli prison guards.

Kristof also cited Israeli American human rights lawyer Sari Bashi, Israeli lawyer Ben Marmarelli, and Ehud Olmert, Prime Minister of Israel (2006–2009).

=== Content ===
Kristof wrote too that Save the Children "commissioned a survey last year of children ages 12 to 17 who had been in Israeli detention; more than half reported witnessing or experiencing sexual violence."

He also wrote that a survey from the Committee to Protect Journalists found that, of 59 Palestinian journalists who had been released by Israeli authorities since the October 7 attacks, "three percent said they had been raped, and 29 percent said they had endured other forms of sexual violence."

Kristof also wrote that Israel welcomed the UN report documenting sexual assaults against Israeli women by Palestinians, but rejected a call in the same report for an investigation into Israeli sexual assaults against Palestinians.

On US support for Israel, Kristof wrote that "American tax dollars subsidize the Israeli security establishment, so this is sexual violence in which the United States is complicit."

Kristof reported that a journalist detained by Israel in Gaza in 2024 said that, while stripped naked, handcuffed, and blindfolded, he had been raped by a dog "with encouragement from a handler in Hebrew". Kristof wrote that there had been other reports from Palestinian prisoners and human rights groups that police dogs have been trained to rape prisoners.

== Reception ==
=== Israeli government responses ===
In a May 12 post on X, formerly Twitter, the Israeli Ministry of Foreign Affairs called the article "Hamas propaganda" and "one of the worst blood libels ever to appear in the modern press". The Israeli Ministry of Foreign Affairs has alleged that Kristof was a "propagandist" who was "part of a false and well-orchestrated anti-Israel campaign aimed at placing Israel on the UN Secretary-General's blacklist." Israeli ambassador Yechiel Leiter said "the only clear crime on display here is the violation of journalistic standards by Mr Kristof and his paper."

On May 12, Kristof responded to the reaction to his piece, calling on Israel to permit Red Cross and lawyer visits to Palestinian security detainees: "If you think these abuse allegations are false, such monitoring visits would be protective. So why not?"

On May 14, Israeli Prime Minister Benjamin Netanyahu and his foreign minister Gideon Sa'ar published a statement saying The New York Times had published "one of the most hideous and distorted lies ever published against the State of Israel in the modern press" and that they had ordered the "initiation of a defamation lawsuit". Israeli Prime Minister Benjamin Netanyahu had previously threatened to sue The New York Times in August 2025 over an article about starvation in Gaza, but did not follow through. According to The Times of Israel, there is no indication that Israel has taken concrete steps to file a lawsuit as of June 2026. Such a lawsuit is unlikely to be successful given the high bar for defamation under US law. Additionally, a lawsuit would potentially draw attention to evidence of abuse of Palestinian prisoners by Israel. A December 2025 report by Israel's Office of the Public Defender found systematic abuse of Palestinian prisoners, while a January 2026 report by B'TSelem found multiple testimonies of sexual and physical violence against Palestinian prisoners.

A spokesperson for The New York Times published a statement in support of Kristof, commending his reporting and source verification process, saying the threatened legal action would be "without merit". Additionally, the statement said that the threat: "is part of a well-worn political playbook that aims to... stifle journalism that does not fit a specific narrative."

According to Yuli Novak, the Israeli government backlash against Kristof's article addressing the sexual torture of Palestinian prisoners is meant to "raise the cost of speaking out" about such abuses.

On 15 May, the Israeli government issued a report attempting to discredit Euro-Med Human Rights Monitor, a Palestinian NGO that was among the sources cited in the article.

=== Media and popular responses ===
==== Statements that sexual violence against Palestinians in Israeli custody had been known ====
Historian Omer Bartov told Democracy Now that, though he was glad to see it published in The New York Times, this has been well known in Israel and that it had "become the policy of the country: to abuse, to humiliate, to rape—systematically" which Bartov said was "part of what happens when a society becomes a genocidal society." Al Jazeera Arabic said Kristof had broken the barrier of silence regarding sexual assault in occupation jails. Yuli Novak, Israeli human rights activist and director of B'Tselem, also noted that abuses of Palestinians in Israeli custody had been documented for a long time.

==== Accusations of blood libel ====
The article has drawn furious reaction from Israeli politicians and media. The American Jewish Committee and columnists Ashley Rindsberg and Dominic Green called the allegation that Israel trains dogs to rape prisoners a blood libel. Yuli Novak has called such accusations a "familiar charge" and argued that the pro-Israeli backlash was manufactured to deter further coverage, "controlling what can be seen, who can be heard, and whose pain is allowed to enter the public realm."

==== Criticism of article sources ====
Criticism based on sourcing focused on a report published by Euro-Mediterranean Human Rights Monitor (EMHRM), one of multiple reports cited in the piece. The report quotes testimony describing dogs with "surveillance cameras" strapped to their backs "let loose" on the prisoners.

O’Donoghue and other critics alleged inconsistencies between the two named witnesses' testimony and previous testimony they had given to B'Tselem and the Washington Post.

==== Criticisms of the timing of publication ====
Some critics, including the American Jewish Committee and Deborah Lipstadt, complained about the timing of publication, which came a day before the widely anticipated release of The Civil Commission’s Silenced No More report into Hamas sexual violence on 7 October, which, after a two year investigation, concluded that such violence was “organised and patterned”. Israel said the newspaper had been offered a preview of the latter report, but the Times denied this and denied knowing about the timing of the report, and covered it once it was released. Isabel Kershner’s in-depth article, "Israeli Report Examines Sexual Violence During and After Hamas-Led Attack", about the Civil Commission report was published in the Times on May 12.

In response to claims that "the piece only ran to overshadow the release of a new report on Hamas’s sexual violence", Emily Tamkin wrote in The Forward that to make such a claim "is to look at coverage of sexual violence through a cynical lens, one in which the question is not 'who was hurt and how can these grievous wrongs be righted?' but rather 'who benefits?'"

==== Responses to the canine rape allegations ====
The claim that Israeli forces trained dogs to rape Palestinian prisoners was particularly controversial and widely-circulated. Deborah Lipstadt said to The Times: "You can train dogs to do that? If that were indeed true, I would expect that every major newspaper including your own would be reporting on this." The Jewish Telegraphic Agency (JTA) and others also questioned the possibility of this element of the story. The JTA interviewed James Crosby, a former police dog trainer and canine aggression expert affiliated with Harvard University's Canine Brain Project, who expressed skepticism of Kristof's claims and said it was "highly unlikely that anybody is going to be able to train a dog to successfully commit a sexual assault.”

India Today wrote that medical and forensic reports state that sexual penetration of humans by dogs is anatomically possible and extremely dangerous. It said peer-review medical case reports have documented severe anal and rectal injuries linked to dog-human sexual contact. Kristof said that "at least three different medical journal articles discuss rectal injuries in humans from anal penetration by dogs". Kristof and The Intercept pointed to reports of others using dogs to rape prisoners, including the Chilean government under Augusto Pinochet and the Nazi SS officer Klaus Barbie. Defenders of Kristof’s article, such as journalist Zaid Jilani, noted that the pro-Israel attacks could lead to testimonies from Holocaust survivors being called into question and strengthen Holocaust denial.

Israeli politician Ehud Olmert, cited in Kristof’s article, stated to The New York Times that his views were misrepresented in the article, and that he did not validate the claims about the state-sanctioned use of dogs, the sexual abuse of children, or that systematic sexual torture is state policy.

According to Emily Tamkin in The Forward, the Israeli Foreign Ministry's "blood libel" accusation "largely responded to the canine rape allegation" but has been "employed to attempt to broadly discredit the range of Kristof’s reporting." Tamkin added that "To attempt to discount all the allegations the piece uncovers with this term is, effectively, to refuse to take seriously any charges of sexual violence so long as the reported perpetrator is Jewish."

Lizzy Savetsky, a pro-Israel influencer, and Elon Gold, an American comedian, joked about canine rape on the red carpet of the Tribeca Festival, which said it "unequivocally condemns the offensive and unacceptable remarks made by Elon Gold and Lizzy Savetsky." Savetsky said she had "no regrets".

==== Accusations of double standards in coverage of Israel and Palestine in The New York Times ====
The NYT also received opposing criticism of giving more credence to allegations of sexual abuse by Palestinian groups than to allegations made by Palestinians. For example, Prem Thakker and Minnah Arshad in Zeteo accused it of double standard with regard to coverage of the Israeli–Palestinian conflict. Middle East Eye noted that Kristof's article was published in the paper’s opinion section, and Al Jazeera English reported “critics” questioning why this was so when the controversial article "Screams Without Words" about sexual and gender-based violence in the October 7 attacks was published as news.

Kathleen Kingsbury, head of Opinion at The New York Times, responded saying:

The distinction between Times newsroom articles and Opinion pieces is not a distinction of reporting or rigor. It is a distinction of form and purpose. An Opinion column offers a proposition that the writer is asking readers to consider. Newsroom articles and investigations, by contrast, unearth and confirm newsworthy facts and information to share with readers, not to make an argument.

Ha’aretz columnists Dahlia Scheindlin and Noa Epstein both criticised the double standards of those who dismissed the findings of either the NYT investigation or the Civil Commission in order to weaponize sexual violence allegations against the other “side”, arguing that both reports need to be taken seriously.

==== Other responses ====
After Times spokespersons Danielle Rhoades Ha and Charlie Stadtlander defended the reporting, Ynet reported that "despite the official backing ... many newsroom journalists have expressed significant distrust with the facts presented" and cited an anonymous reporter who said, "We feel the opinion section is hurting the credibility of the entire brand and repeatedly lowering the professional standard for all of us."

A protest organized by pro-Israel groups #EndJewHatred, Stop Antizionism, Hineni, and Movement Against Antizionism outside The New York Times Building on May 14 drew over 200 demonstrators calling for the retraction of the article and for Kristof to be fired. The protest featured pro-Israel influencers including Dov Hikind, Zach Sage Fox, and Aliza Licht.

The Jewish News Syndicate reported that the National Center for Public Policy Research, a conservative US think tank and a shareholder in The New York Times Company, is demanding that The New York Times release its documents relating to "The Silence That Meets the Rape of Palestinians" to determine if the publication "bypassed its corporate governance and risk oversight policies" in its publication of the May 11 column and of Kristof and Kingsbury's May 21 follow-up responding to questions about the column.

== See also ==
- Use of animals for sexual assault of humans
- Wartime sexual violence
- Zionist political violence
