= Kamoha =

Israeli organization for Orthodox Jewish homosexuals

Kamoha.org.il (Hebrew: כמוך, English: 'like you') is an Israeli organization for Orthodox Jewish homosexuals. It is aimed primarily at the Religious Zionist community, but is also open to those from the Hareidi sector. The organization has split from the organization Havruta, and chose a much more conservative approach, promoting conversion therapy and marriage of gay men to lesbians.

== Positions ==
=== Promoting conversion therapy ===
Kamoha.org.il promotes conversion therapy, and offers subsidies to finance it, declaring that some gay men might yet be able to develop opposite sex attraction and live a fulfilling normative heterosexual lifestyle. Yet it states that success is not guaranteed and that these treatments cannot be a sufficient solution for all gay men.

=== Pairing gay men with lesbians ===
The organization supports the project Anachnu (Hebrew: אנחנו, English: 'us'). Anachnu is a matchmaking service which pairs gay and lesbian Orthodox Jews. This has been criticized by Orthodox lesbian organization Bat-Kol, and by Orthodox gay men's organization Havruta, which claims that this will create "unhealthy relationships" and is an attempt to "hide [the] existence" of LGBT people, a view supported by Rabbi Aviner.

=== Opposing pride ===
The organization formally opposes participation in pride parades, and does not see having an orientation it regards as posing a variety of halachic questions as being something specifically to be proud of. Kamoha, along with Hod, criticized the participation of Havruta in the Tel-Aviv pride and Jerusalem pride.

== Rabbinical support ==
The organization is backed by Rabbi Areleh Harel, former Rosh Yeshiva of Yeshivat Hesder Shilo, who promotes his match making initiative together with the organization under the brand name Anachnu (English: 'us'). The organization declares that it is in contact with Orthodox Rabbis. Among those Rabbis who publicly support the organization are: Rabbi Menachem Borshtin, the head of the Puah Institute; Rabbi Yuval Sherlo, the Rosh Yeshiva of Yeshivat Hesder Petah Tikva; and Rabbi Yechiel Paust, former Rosh Yeshiva of Yeshivat Moreshet Yaakov.

== See also ==
- Lesbian and gay topics and Judaism
- Havruta religious gays
- Bat Kol religious lesbian community in Israel
- Hod Gay men Led by Rabbi Ron Yosef
- Lavender marriage
