= Bat Kol (disambiguation) =

Bath ḳōl is a divine voice in Judaism.

Bat Kol may also refer to:

- Bat Kol (organization), an Israeli organization for lesbians who are Orthodox Jews
- Bat Kol Institute, a Christian-Jewish studies organization; see Catholic Church in Israel § Universities and educational institutes
