= Elon Gold =

American comedian, television actor, writer and producer

- Born: The Bronx, New York City, U.S.
- Spouse: Sacha Gold (m. 1994)
- Children: 4

Comedy career
- Medium: Stand-up; television; film; books
- Genres: Jewish comedy; sarcasm
- Subjects: Jewish culture; American culture; everyday life; pop culture; current events; sex; gender differences; human behavior; human sexuality
- Website: www.elongold.com

Elon Gold is an American stand-up comedian, actor, writer, producer and podcaster.

== Early life and education ==
Elon Gold was born to Lynn and Sidney Gold. He was raised in the Pelham Parkway section of The Bronx in New York. His older brother Steven is involved in the music production industry. He had a younger brother Ari, a rhythm and blues singer. Ari died of leukemia in 2021, at the age of 47. He attended the Westchester Day School in Mamaroneck, New York and the Marsha Stern Talmudical Academy in Manhattan.

== Career ==
Gold first starred in the television series Stacked. He also starred in the short-lived sitcom In-Laws. Best known for his impressions, including those of Al Gore, Jeff Goldblum, Howard Stern and Jay Leno, Gold was a judge on The Next Best Thing, a celebrity impersonation competition series on ABC. He appeared in the movie Cheaper by the Dozen (2003) as a cameraman from The Oprah Winfrey Show and had a recurring role in the short-lived ABC prime-time show, The Dana Carvey Show in 1996.

Gold often writes with his long-time friend and writing partner Ari Schiffer. The two have written multiple pilots together, including one that sold to Touchstone Television. Touchstone purchased the script, Wifeless, about two straight best friends who get married. He has appeared in several television shows, such as The Mentalist (2009) and Frasier (2004). He also had a recurring role as the head of Hulu in Curb Your Enthusiasm in 2021.

His 2014 comedy special, Chosen and Taken, appeared on Netflix. Gold appeared as himself in Season 3 of the Home Box Office series Crashing, first broadcast in 2019.

In 2024 he began filming the Israeli film, The Badchan alongside Shuli Rand. Gold plays a Yiddish-speaking badchan who is hired by Rand's character. He also plays journalist Harvey Levin, alongside Abbie Cornish in the upcoming film, Trust Me, I'm a Doctor, based on the former doctor of late reality star, Anna Nicole Smith.

In June 2026, Gold appeared at the Tribeca Film Festival to promote the Israeli film in which he stars, The Wedding Entertainer. During the appearance, Gold made jokes involving canine rape in Israel following Nicholas Kristof's opinion piece "The Silence That Meets the Rape of Palestinians". The pro-Israel influencer Lizzy Savetsky then specifically referenced the sexual abuse of Palestinian prisoners in Israeli detention facilities. Video of the exchange circulated widely on social media. The Tribeca Film Festival subsequently condemned both Gold and Savetsky.

== Filmography ==
=== Film ===
Year	Title	Role	Notes
1993	Basic Values: Sex, Shock & Censorship in the 90s	Howard Stern / Richard Simmons (voice)	television movie
1998	Restaurant	Kurt	
1998	Origin of the Species	Paul	
1999	Dirt Merchant	Blood Banker	
2000	Mary and Rhoda	Jonah Seimeier	television movie
2000	Good as Gold	Michael's Brother	television movie
2003	Cheaper by the Dozen	Camera Crew Member #2	
2007	Chabad Telethon	Host	television movie
2008	Turbocharge: The Unauthorized Story of the Cars	Howard Stern	
2008	Soccer Mom	Tony da Silva	
2011	Pro-Semitism: Psychotherapy	Himself	Short
2011	Pro-Semitism: Law	Himself	Short
2012	Little Women, Big Cars	Richard	
2012	Little Women, Big Cars 2	Richard	
2014	Premature	Mr. Hughes	
2014	Twinkies & Donuts	Allen	Short
2020	The Binge	Chester Friedlander	
2020	The Broken Hearts Gallery	Schmuli	
2025	Trust Me, I'm a Doctor	Harvey Levin	Post-production
2025	The Badchan	Meshulam	Post-production

=== Television ===
Year	Title	Role	Notes
1994	She TV	Various	one episode
1996	Ned and Stacey	Nick	one episode
1996	The Dana Carvey Show	Various	three episodes
1996	Aliens in the Family	Yukkles (voice)	one episode
1998	You're the One	Mark Weitz	three episodes
1998	Celebrity Deathmatch	Howard Stern (voice)	two episodes
1998	Cartoon Sushi	voice	one episode
2000	TV Funhouse	Voice	one episode
2000-2001	Clerks	Voice	three episodes
2002-2003	In-Laws	Matt Landis	
2003	Las Vegas	Ben Pearce	one episode
2003–2004	Saturday Night Live	Various Voices	
2003–2006	Chappelle's Show	Various	
2004	Frasier	Brad	one episode
2004	The Wrong Coast	Various Voices	
2005	Tripping the Rift	Jay Leno (voice)	one episode
2005–2006	Stacked	Gavin P. Miller	
2009	The Mentalist	Paul Fricke	one episode
2010	Glenn Martin, DDS	Jeff Goldblum (voice)	one episode
2010–2011	Bones	Dr. Paul Lidner	three episodes
2012	American Dad!	Various Voices	two episodes
2018	The Bar Mitzvah	Jozen	
2019	Crashing	Self	one episode
2021	Curb Your Enthusiasm	Jake Blum: Head of Hulu	three episodes
2024	Zehu Ze!	Donald Trump	guest star

== Personal life ==
He is an observant Jew. On Friday, August 22, 2014, he was a victim of an antisemitic incident whilst walking home from one Shabbat dinner in Los Angeles, California. He wrote an op ed about it in The Jewish Journal of Greater Los Angeles a few days later.

He married his wife Sacha Gold in 1994, and they have four children together.
