= Israel Gay Youth =

Organization

Israel Gay Youth (IGY NGO)
- איגי - ארגון נוער גאה
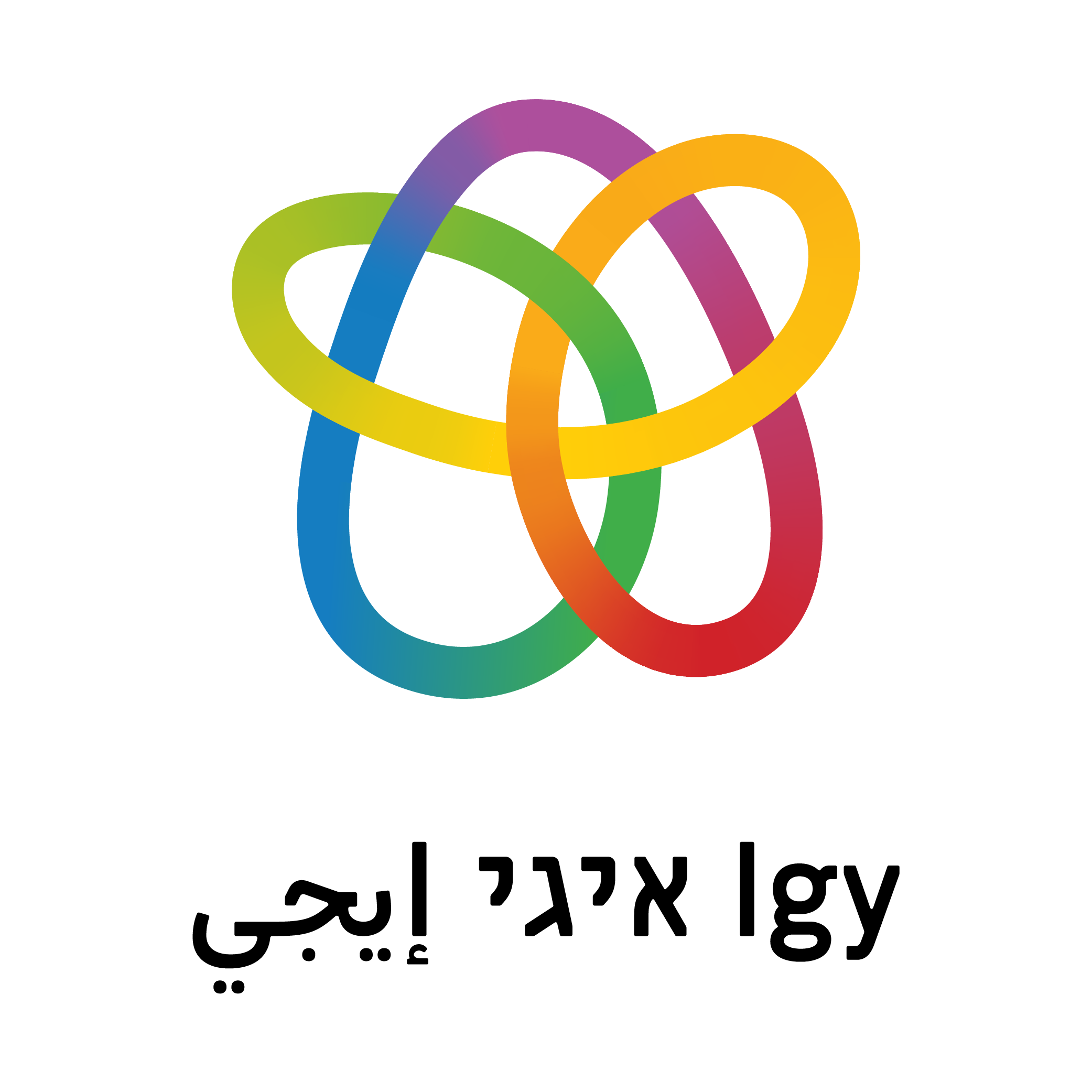
- Founded: 2001 (The NGO registered in 2004)
- Founder: Yaniv Waizmann, Gal Uchovsky
- Type: LGBTQ Organization
- Purpose: Social programs for LGBTQ Youth
- Location: The Gay Center in Tel Aviv
- Region served: 22 cities all over Israel
- CEO: Rom Ohayon, Yoni Avitan
- Key people: 4,000
- Volunteers: 350
- Website: https://igy.org.il
- Formerly called: Kamoni Kamocha

Israel Gay Youth (IGY) (Hebrew: ארגון נוער גאה, Irgun Noar Ge'eh, lit. "Proud Youth Organization"; Hebrew: איגי, Igy, "IGY") was founded in 2001 in Israel as a non-profit NGO, branching off from the Israeli Gay, Lesbian, Bisexual and Transgender Association.

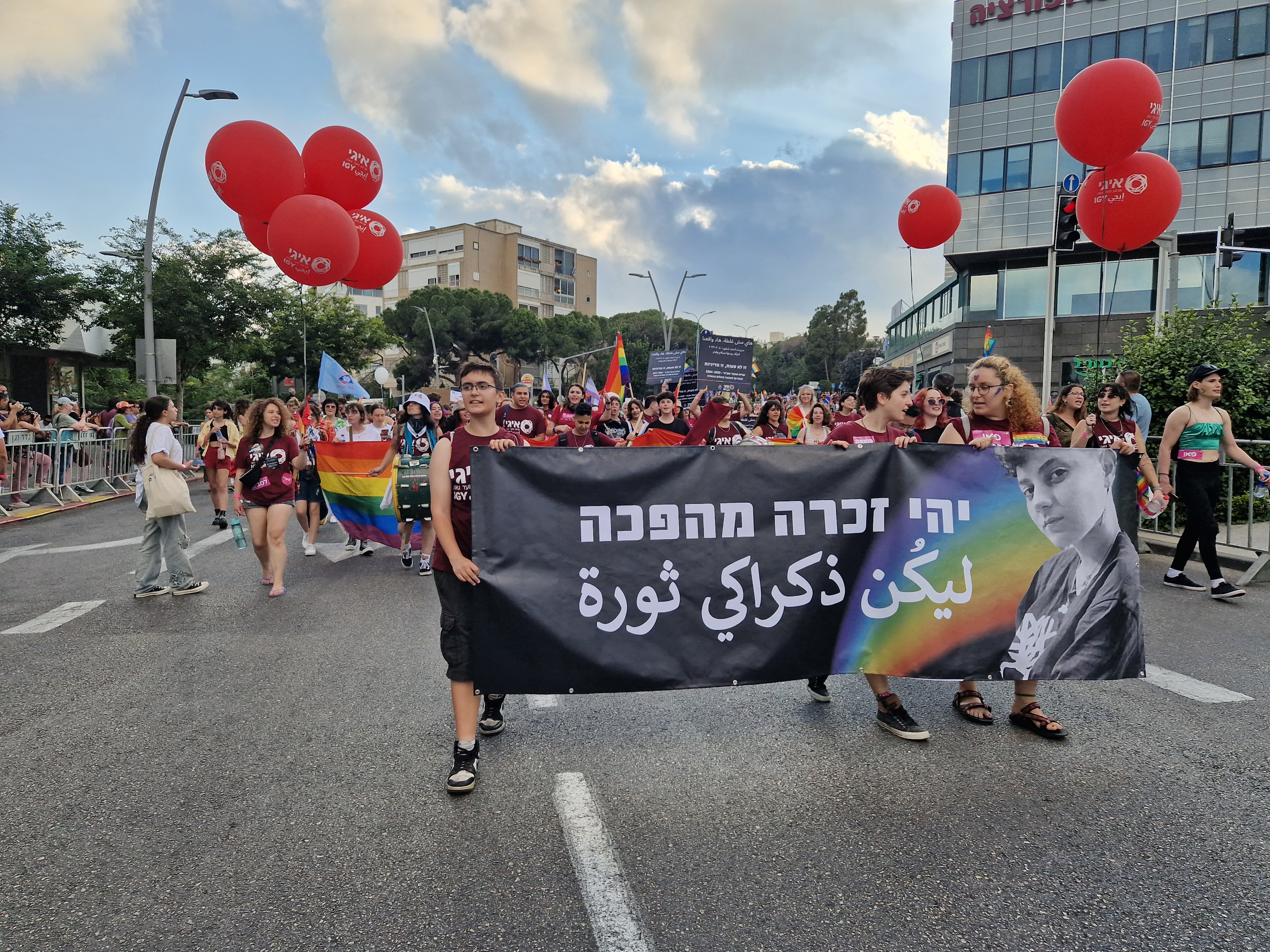
IGY members march in the Pride Parade in Haifa June 2023

== Overview ==
Israel Gay Youth (IGY) is a voluntary Israeli NGO for lesbian, gay, bisexual, asexual, pansexual, queer, and transgender youth, as well as young people questioning their sexual orientation and their gender identity. IGY provides a social framework for youth to meet and advocates for LGBT youth in Israel. The organization operates in 22 cities and towns in Israel for over 1,500 youth annually. Additional programs include a youth club in Tel Aviv, leadership programs, topic groups (such as groups for HIV positive youth) and Nir Program, named after Nir Katz, a victim of the shooting at the Bar Noar LGBT youth club in 2009. The organization is recognized and supported by the local Ministry of Education.

== History ==
Social activities for youth were held by the National Association of GLBT in Israel ("The Aguda") during the 1990s. In 2001, IGY was established within the Aguda by Yaniv Waizmann, operating at first mostly in Tel Aviv and nearby cities. The organization became independent in 2004 by Yaniv Waizmann and Gal Uchovsky. In the coming years, IGY increased activity and expanded its geographical range, including to peripheral cities and towns in the south and north of the country. In 2010, the Ministry of Education recognized volunteer work in the organization as part of the mandatory volunteer hours in Israeli high schools.

Today, Waizmann functions as IGY's chairperson. Additional leaders include Gal Uchovsky, and Avner Dafni who serves as executive director. Offices are located in the Gay Community Center in Tel Aviv. The organization is one of the largest in the local LGBT community, collaborating extensively with Tehila, and organization of parents and friends of LGBT, and Hoshen (Israeli GLSEN), the community's education center.

== List of cities and towns ==
The organization is active in Kiryat Shmona, Karmiel, Haifa, HaKrayot, Jezreel Valley, Afula, Hadera, Kfar Saba, Netanya, Herzliya, Hod HaSharon, Petah Tikva, Rosh HaAyin, Tel Aviv, Ramat Gan, Kiryat Ono, Holon, Bat Yam, Rishon LeZion, Rehovot, Ramla-Lod, Modi'in, Ashdod, Ashkelon, Kiryat Gat, Be'er Sheva and Eilat.

Additional groups include "IGY stars" a drama class (now inactive), Religious groups in collaboration with Hevruta and Bat-Kol; "IGY Ambassadors", an educational group in collaboration with Hoshen; HIV-positive group and a youth club which operates in the Israeli Gay Community Center. Additional collaborations include the youth groups of Jerusalem House for Pride and Tolerance.

== See also ==
- 2009 Tel Aviv gay centre shooting
- Tehila
