= Lizzy Savetsky =

American influencer (born 1985)

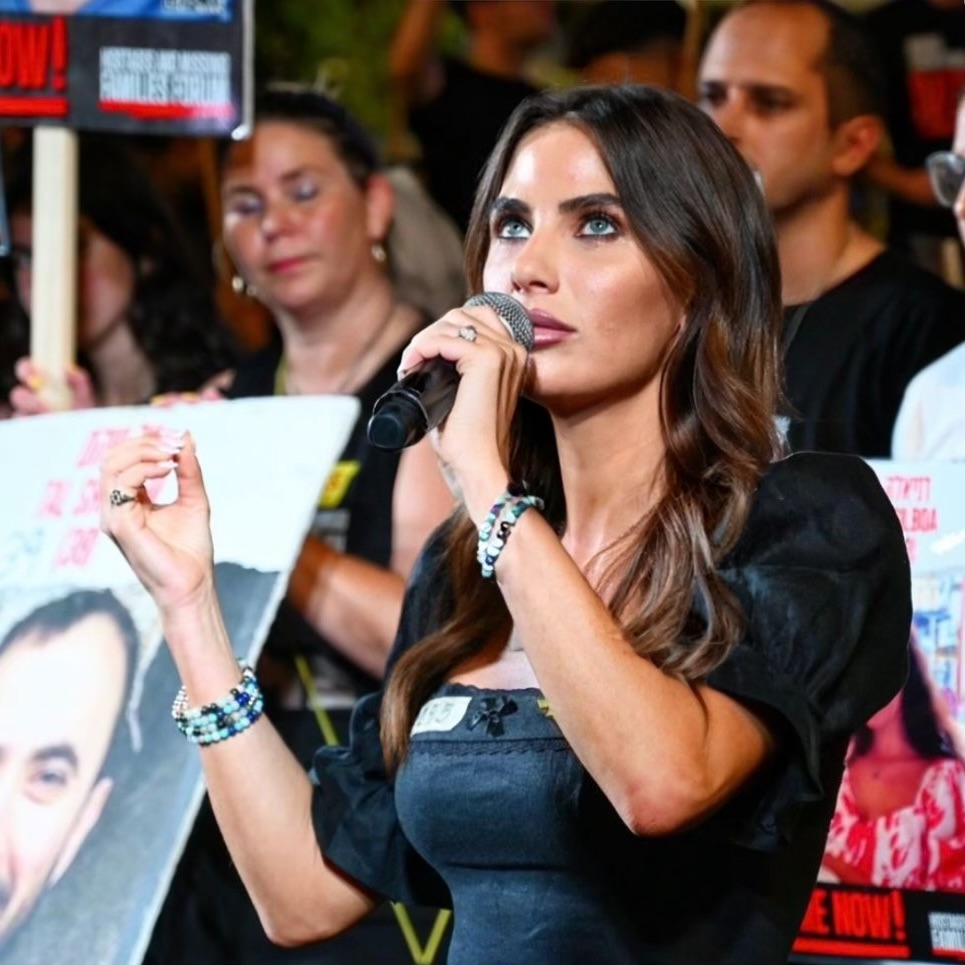
- Savetsky in 2024
- Born: Elizabeth Blum; October 1985 (age 41); Fort Worth, Texas, U.S.
- Education: New York University (BA); University of Pennsylvania (MA)
- Spouse: Ira Savetsky (m. 2009)
- Children: 3

Instagram information
- Page: lizzysavetsky
- Followers: 498,000 (21 June 2026)

TikTok information
- Page: lizzysavetsky
- Followers: 84,500 (21 June 2026)
- Website: Official website

Elizabeth Savetsky (née Blum; born October 1985) is an American social media influencer and pro-Israel activist.

== Early life and education ==
Savetsky was born in October 1985 and grew up in Fort Worth, Texas. She sang country music, won the Miss Teen Duncanville title and was a runner-up in the 2002 Miss Teen Texas pageant. She first visited Israel at age 18 on a Birthright Israel trip. She earned her undergraduate degree from New York University and her master's degree in education from the University of Pennsylvania.

== Career ==
After graduating, Savetsky worked in fashion PR and maintained a moderately successful blog in the mid-2000s. As readership declined, she shifted to emerging social media platforms like Instagram and Facebook. In 2013, she began her Instagram account focusing on accessories, calling herself “excessoriesexpert". She became the social media director for Seventh House Public Relations and the host of an IGTV series for Jewish matchmaking called “Bashert By Lizzy”.

In 2022, Savetsky was cast on the Real Housewives of New York Season 14. In November, she stated that she was withdrawing from the show because of online antisemitic attacks against her. Page Six later reported that she left due to a conflict with another cast member.

=== Pro-Israel activism ===
According to Savetsky, an Israeli friend asked her to respond to growing anti-semitism during the May 2021 Israel–Palestine crisis. In response, she started posting pro-Israel content as well as content about Judaism on her social media accounts. Savetsky has stated that she lost social media followers and her manager as a result.

After the October 7 attacks, Savetsky posted in support of the Gaza war. To advocate for the Israeli hostages taken by Palestinian armed groups from Israel, she walked through New York City in blood-stained clothing and interviewed their families. She also posted about the pro-Palestine college protests and antisemitism on college campuses. By February 2024, she had 350,000 followers on Instagram.

In March 2024, Savetsky told The Times of Israel that her primary goal is to increase Jewish pride rather than attempt to change the minds of antisemitic people, saying: "The best reaction to antisemitism is to be unapologetically Jewish". Later that year, Savetsky received a citation from New York City Mayor Eric Adams for her efforts in combating antisemitism. The honor was presented at the annual Hanukkah celebration hosted at Gracie Mansion. In January 2025, she was named as a contender for the role of U.S. Special Envoy to Monitor and Combat Antisemitism in the Second cabinet of Donald Trump by the New York Post. She also received the "Voice of Iron" award at a ceremony held at the Knesset in Jerusalem, Israel. The Knesset, Israel's national legislature, presented the award to honor her efforts in defending Israel and amplifying its voice during the Israel-Hamas War.

In February 2025, Savetsky posted to her Instagram account a video clip of the far-right politician Meir Kahane, who was convicted of multiple acts of terrorism in the United States and in Israel. Savetsky wrote that "Rabbi Meir Kahane, of blessed memory, was labeled as a violent extremist, but he was right. This is the truth right here. The only language the Arabs understand is force and fear." The post triggered an immediate and mostly negative reaction. In a follow-up video and interview, she stated that she endorsed only the specific message she shared, not all of Kahane's views. She also elaborated that she supports the use of force to combat Palestinian "terror", which motivated her to post the initial video. Savetsky also endorsed Trump's proposed plan to remove Palestinians from the Gaza Strip.

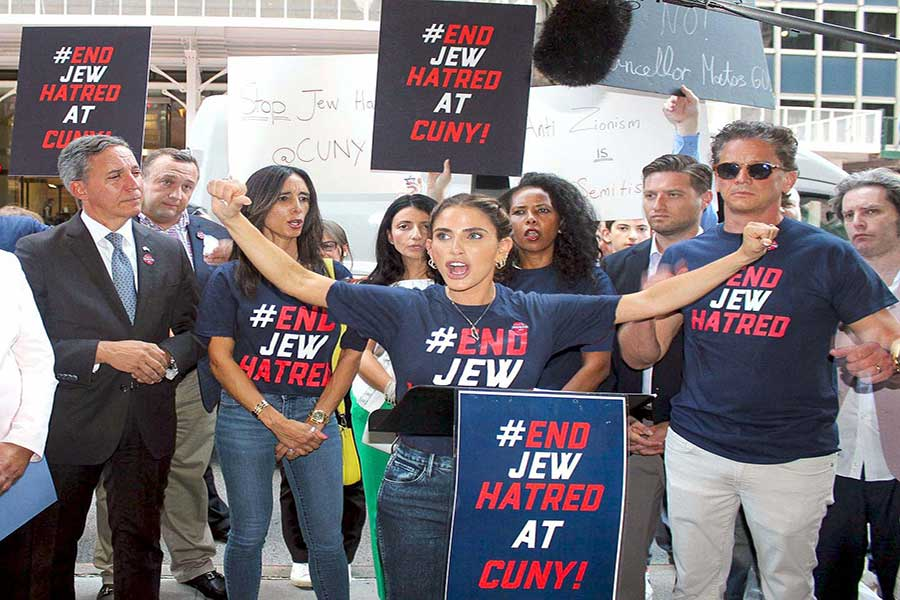
Savetsky at a rally

In June 2026, a video of Savetsky and comedian Elon Gold at the premier for The Wedding Entertainer at the Tribeca Festival was posted on social media. Gold said the movie was filmed in Israel, saying, "I was only raped by two Israeli dogs," to which Savetsky replies, "I thought they only raped Palestinians." The comments were denounced in a statement by the Festival as “offensive and unacceptable.” The jokes were in reference to "The Silence That Meets the Rape of Palestinians", Nicholas Kristof's New York Times column that included allegations by Palestinians that dogs were used to commit sexual abuse in Israeli prisons. Supporters of Israel called the column a "blood libel". Savetsky said that she did not regret the jokes: "the issue here should not be dog rape, which is biologically impossible, it should be the blood libel spread by the NYT."

== Personal life ==
Savetsky is married to plastic surgeon Ira Savetsky. Her content frequently features their three children. According to Savetsky, she and her family have received death threats because of antisemitism and her pro-Israel activism. Savetsky follows Orthodox Judaism.
