= Ari Gold (musician) =

American singer-songwriter (1974–2021)

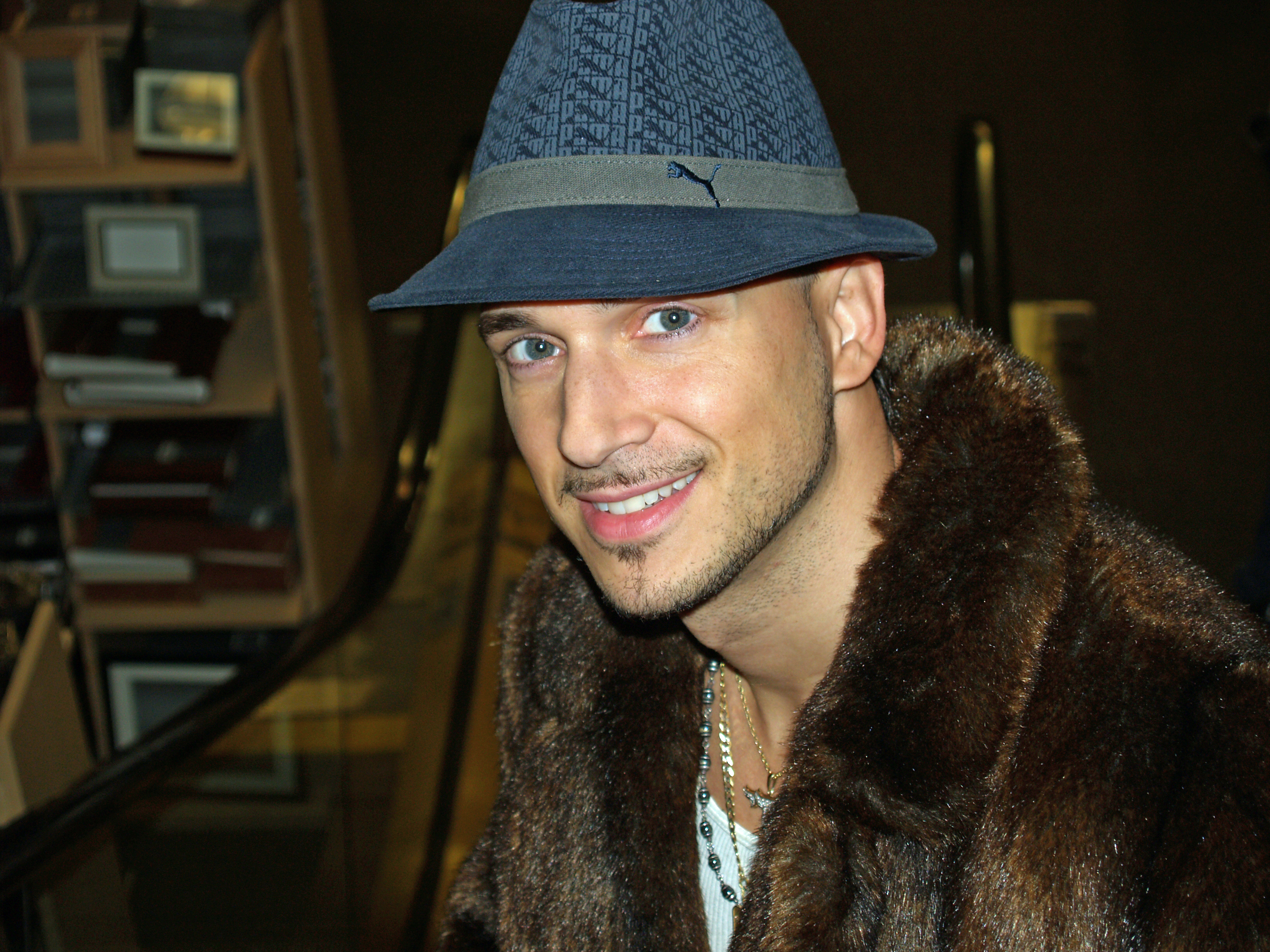
- Ari Gold in 2007

Background information
- Also known as: GoldNation, Sir Ari
- Born: February 11, 1974
- Origin: The Bronx, New York City, U.S.
- Died: February 14, 2021 (aged 47)
- Genres: R&B, soul, dance, pop, adult contemporary
- Occupations: Singer-songwriter, music producer, actor, model
- Instruments: Vocals
- Years active: 1996–2021
- Labels: Gold 18 Records, JRED Music
- Website: AriGold.com

Ari Gold (February 11, 1974 – February 14, 2021) was an American pop singer and songwriter. He was openly gay, and regularly addressed being both Jewish and gay. He starred in an autobiographical theater production Ari Gold– Untitled: The Making of a Gay Pop Star.

== Early life ==
Gold was born and raised in the Bronx, New York City, in an Orthodox Jewish family. He was discovered while singing at his brother Steven's bar mitzvah at the age of five.

He was awarded top prize alongside Steven and his other brother, future comedian Elon, at the First Annual Jewish Children's Song Festival. Gold landed his first job as a professional singer and actor by performing the lead role on the CBS Children's recording Pot Belly Bear: Song and Stories. The album went platinum, and led to his successful career as a child vocalist. He sang over 400 jingles, and provided various voices for Cabbage Patch Kids and cult favorite Jem. He also provided vocals for the song "A Father Should Be..." by Starlight Girl Ba Nee, which appeared in the episodes The Jem Jam Part 1, and the final episode A Father Should Be.... He also performed back-up vocals for Diana Ross and Cyndi Lauper.

After graduating from the Ramaz School in Manhattan, Gold studied at Yale University. He then transferred to New York University, where he would receive his Bachelor of Arts.

== Musical career ==
=== 1996–2002 ===
Gold began performing original music at Joe's Pub, Fez, China Club, Barracuda, Metronome, Avalon, Pyramid Club, Splash, Bar d'O, Starlight, and CBGB's. He recorded the material for his self-titled 2001 debut album, Ari Gold, in which Gold uses male pronouns, and shows men being affectionate with one another in his music videos. The album won gold at the 2002 Outmusic Award for Outstanding Debut Recording. Later that year, Gold was named one of Genre Magazine's "Men We Love".

His debut also caught the attention of songwriter Desmond Child. Their first collaboration "I'm All About You" (Island Universal) was on the Top 20 UK singles charts, and a Top 10 dance hit. The song was co-written and produced with UK garage musicians DJ Luck & MC Neat.

=== 2003–2005: Space Under Sun ===
In 2003, Grammy award-winning producer David Morales remixed "I'll Be Here", which Ari co-wrote with Automagic for Nashom of The Ones' ("Flawless") solo project. The song became a Top-10 Billboard dance hit and was featured on Queer As Folk. In 2003, Gold began recording his second album. In January 2004, Gold's second album Space Under Sun was released on his label GOLD18 Records. It debuted at No. 1 on the Out-voice Charts. The Advocate wrote that his "equal parts of sly, finger-snappin' sass and earthy R&B finesse," created the "crisp...sound of a platinum-selling recording."

The video single "Wave of You" debuted as a DVD extra and became a mainstay during the launch of Logo TV, included in its list for the best videos of 2005. MetroSource magazine also named Ari "One of the 25 People That Make Us Proud". Gold's appearance in the VH1 special My Coolest Years: In the Closet solidified Gold's status as an emerging gay icon. In 2005, Space Under Sun took home the Out Music Award for Outstanding New Recording.

On the Space Under Sun World Tour, Gold opened for RuPaul and Chaka Khan, and headlined clubs and festivals in Europe (France, Italy, Switzerland, Belgium, and the Czech Republic). He also toured Canada, and in over 25 cities across the US, including the world's largest stage at the Reno Hilton.

=== 2005: The Remixes ===
In September 2005, Gold released his first remix album, The Remixes. The album was named the No. 2 Best Independent Release of 2005, according to national magazine The Advocate. The first single, "Love Will Take Over," became a Billboard Dance Chart hit. The "Love Will Take Over" video has been played on HBO Zone, Rock America, and For Promo Only, and claimed the top spot for two weeks in a row on MTV's Logo. In December 2005, Gold released Ari Gold: The Photo-book.

=== 2006–2008: Transport Systems ===
In 2006, Gold began recording his album in Los Angeles and New York City, where he began working with Steve Skinner and Grammy Award-winning producer Joe Hogue on the album. In 2007, Gold released his third studio album, Transport Systems. Gold debuted on the Billboard Top 10 charts for the first time, six months after winning the prestigious 13th Annual USA Songwriting Competition for "Where The Music Takes You", where he won the Overall Grand Prize. The album features special guests Adam Joseph, Mr. Man, Sasha Allen and Dave Koz. LGBT-focused magazine Pink wrote his lyrics lingered on "gender, sexuality, addiction and race." In early 2008, the song "Love Wasn't Built in a Day" won in the 7th Annual Independent Music Awards for Best R&B Song.

=== 2010–2013: Between the Spirit and the Flesh ===
In 2010, Gold returned to the studio to begin the recording sessions for his fourth studio album. In October 2010, Gold released the lead single "Make My Body Rock". In May 2011, Gold released his fourth album, Between the Spirit & the Flesh, under the name Sir Ari. In mid-2011, Gold released the second single "Sparkle". In February 2012, Gold released "My Favorite Religion" as the third single.

In 2013, Gold released his second remix album, Play My F**kin' Remix.

=== 2015–2021: Soundtrack to Freedom ===
In July 2015, Gold released his single "Sex Like a Pornstar". In August 2015, Gold released his fifth studio album, Soundtrack to Freedom, under the name GoldNation.

== Other ventures ==
=== Songwriting ===
Gold has written songs for #1 Billboard dance recording artist Kevin Aviance on both his debut Box of Chocolates and the Tony Moran-produced Entity. He also worked with Diane Warren and Stephen Bray on the 1980s teen scream Tommy Page's last album, Ten till Midnight, in which Page covered Gold's first written song, Dance To the Beat of My Heart. Gold's music has been licensed to numerous independent films, including Boy Culture, Shortbus, and Latin Boys Go to Hell, for which he served as the music supervisor, and appeared in the film performing his song "See Through Me". He also served as music supervisor on the documentary Fabulous! The Story of Queer Cinema.

=== Modeling career ===
Gold appeared in fashion magazines such as W and VIBE, for which he was photographed by Walter Chin, and chosen as one of the Stylistics in the January 2002 issue. He was named one of "The 9 Hottest Men in NYC" by H/X magazine, and one of the Hottest Men in the World by DNA magazine. After interviewing and photographing Gold for AXM magazine, Boy George chose him to be the spokesperson for his clothing line RUDE.

== Illness and death ==
Gold died from leukemia on February 14, 2021, three days after his 47th birthday. RuPaul, whom Gold had described as a mentor, was among those to express condolences on social media.

== Discography ==
Albums

- 2001: Ari Gold
- 2004: Space Under Sun
- 2005: The Remixes
- 2007: Transport Systems
- 2011: Between the Spirit & the Flesh
- 2013: Play My F**kn Remix
- 2015: Soundtrack to Freedom

Singles

- 2001: See Through Me
- 2004: Wave of You
- 2004: He's on My Team (featuring Kendra Ross)
- 2005: Love Will Take Over (JKriv's Love Lounge Radio Mix)
- 2007: Where the Music Takes You (featuring Sasha Allen)
- 2007: Love Wasn't Built in a Day (featuring Dave Koz)
- 2008: Human (featuring Mr. Man)
- 2009: I Can Forgive You
- 2010: Mr. Mistress
- 2010: Make My Body Rock
- 2011: Sparkle (featuring Sarah Dash)
- 2012: My Favourite Religion
- 2013: Play My F**Z Record
- 2013: Love Goddess (Remix)
- 2015: Sex Like a Pornstar
- 2016: Turn Out the Night
- 2017: Make Music

== Filmography ==
Film/T.V.
Year	Title	Role	Notes
1985	The Life & Adventures of Santa Claus	Child (voice)	
1986–88	Jem	Ba Nee (singing voice)	
1997	Latin Boys Go to Hell	Trash Pop Star	cameo / composer: song "See Through Me", music supervisor
1999	The Olive Tree	Ari	supporting role
2006	Paws for Style	Himself	cameo
2007	Starrbooty	Tyrone Cohen	supporting role
2021	Mister Sister	Jackson	supporting role
TV documentary
Year	Title	Role	Notes
2004	Sex 'n' Pop	Himself	episode: "It Ain't Necessarily So"
2006	NewNowNext Music	Himself	
2006	Phone Sex	Caller	
2006	Fabulous! The Story of Queer Cinema	Himself	also music supervisor
2007	Indie Sex: Teens	Himself	
2007	Indie Sex: Extremes	Himself	

== Awards and nominations ==
Year	Category	Nominated work	Result
Outmusic Awards
2002	Outstanding Debut Recording	"Ari Gold"	won
2004	Out Song of the Year	"He's on My Team"	nominated
2005	Outstanding New Recording	"Space Under Sun"	won
USA Songwriting Competition
2007		"Where the Music Takes You"	won
Independent Music Awards
2008	Best R&B Song	"Love Wasn't Built In A Day"	won
