= Hagai El-Ad =

Israeli LGBT and human rights activist (born 1969)

- חגי אלעד
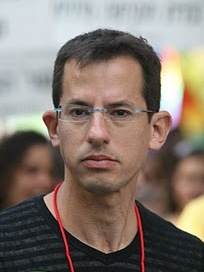
- El-Ad in December of 2009
- Born: October 1, 1969 (age 57); Haifa, Israel
- Citizenship: Israel
- Education: Physics, Hebrew University of Jerusalem, Harvard University
- Years active: 2014 - Present
- Known for: LGBT and Human Rights Activism

Hagai El-Ad (Hebrew: חגי אלעד; born October 1, 1969), is an Israeli LGBT and human rights activist who served as the director general of B'Tselem from May 2014 to June 2023. Previously, he was director of the Association for Civil Rights in Israel and the Jerusalem Open House.

== Early life, military service, and education ==
Hagai El-Ad was born on October 1, 1969, in Haifa to Israeli parents of Ashkenazi Jewish origin. He was drafted into the IDF and served in Unit 504. After his time in the IDF, he enrolled in the Hebrew University of Jerusalem, from 1997 to 2000, and obtained a degree in physics. He was a pre-doctoral researcher in the Astrophysics Center of Harvard University.

== Activism ==
In 2000, El-Ad returned to Israel after concluding his studies at Harvard, and was appointed the first CEO of the Jerusalem Open House, which opened its headquarters in the Ben Yehuda Street of Jerusalem. In June 2002, he led Jerusalem's first Pride parade, "Love without Limits", which caused significant controversy within the city. In 2006, El-Ad stepped down as CEO of the Open House and was replaced by Noah Satet.

On July 1, 2008, El-Ad became the director of the Association for Civil Rights in Israel. In December 2009, the Association conducted its first-ever Human Rights Day Parade, in which over 100 additional organizations participated, along with thousands of individuals. El-Ad participated in protests in Sheikh Jarrah, and was arrested by Israeli authorities.

== As CEO of B'Tselem ==
El-Ad became the CEO of B'Tselem in May 2014.

In October 2016, the United Nations Security Council held a session on "Settlements as an obstacle to peace and a two-state solution". Also participating in the discussion was El-Ad, who called for an end to the occupation in the West Bank and East Jerusalem.

On October 18, 2018, El-Ad appeared again before the Security Council, this time in an official session, and devoted his remarks mainly to the expected evacuation of Khan al-Ahmar and Israel's behavior in the conflicts on the Israel-Gaza border. He attacked the Israeli legal apparatus that allows construction in al-Ahmar to be called "illegal" and authorizes remote sniper fire at protesters in the Gaza Strip, including the Supreme Court, which he called an accomplice in war crimes.

In addition, El-Ad likened the status of Palestinians in the West Bank to that of African-Americans in the United States during the Jim Crow laws, and to the apartheid system that existed in South Africa. In his remarks, he called on the Security Council and the international community to take immediate action against the Israeli occupation of the West Bank, and in particular to stop the evacuation of Khan al-Ahmar.

El-Ad was condemned for his remarks at the hearing by Israeli Prime Minister Benjamin Netanyahu, the Permanent Representative of Israel to the United Nations, Danny Danon, who said that El-Ad should be "ashamed", and by the Ambassador of the United States to the United Nations at the time, Nikki Haley.

El-Ad has elaborated on his characterization of Israel as an apartheid state, writing that it was "apartheid 2.0". International organizations like Human Rights Watch and Amnesty International have arrived at the same conclusion, calling Israel an apartheid state in reports.

== Writing ==
- El-Ad, Hagai (1 April 2026). "The Strategy Behind the West Bank Pogroms: Deir Yassin: From 1948 to today, a brutal truth underlies the pursuit of Israeli supremacy". Haaretz. Israel.
