= Shoval (organization) =

Jewish Orthodox LGBT initiative in Israel

Shoval - All is created for your glory
- שׁב"ל - שהכל ברא לכבודו
- Purpose: Promoting tolerance and understanding of LGBT people within religious communities in Israel
- Official language: Hebrew
- Parent organization: Havruta, Bat Kol

Shoval - All is created for your glory (Hebrew: שׁב"ל - שהכל ברא לכבודו) is an initiative of Jewish orthodox lesbian, gay, bisexual and transgender people in Israel that actively promotes tolerance and understanding of LGBT people within religious communities in Israel through meeting with educators. It is a cooperation of gay men from Havruta, and lesbian women from Bat Kol, and is supported and promoted by these organizations. The organisation's name derives from the second of the Sheva Brachot.

== Mission statement ==
Shoval promotes tolerance and understanding of LGBT people within the religious communities in Israel. Shoval's main focus is to create a safe place within the religious communities in Israel for LGBT adolescents. It provides educational programs that are directed at educators, social workers, and people that affect LGBT adolescents directly, in order to raise awareness about LGBT issues.

== Core values ==
Shoval members hold to the following core values:

- Sexual orientation and gender identity are significant and central parts of a person’s life.
- Acceptance and being at peace with one’s sexual orientation is the way to an ethical life of health and fulfillment.
- There should be a place within religious society for LGBT people, without contradiction or denial.
- The religious society has a responsibility for the physical and mental well being for all youth with alternative sexual orientation and alternative gender identities.

== See also ==
- Lesbian and gay topics and Judaism
- Havruta Religious gay community in Israel
- Bat Kol religious lesbian community in Israel
