= Between the Spirit & the Flesh =

Studio album by Sir Ari
- Released: May 11, 2011
- Recorded: 2009–2010
- Genre: R&B
- Length: 35:48
- Label: Gold 18 Records
- Producer: Ari Gold, Yaron Fuchs, Sarah Dash, Michael Colin, Steven Gold, Kazuhiko Gomi, Brandin Pope, Steve Skinner, Ido Zmishlany

Sir Ari chronology
Transport Systems (2007)	Between the Spirit & the Flesh (2011)

Between the Spirit & the Flesh is the fourth studio album of American singer, Ari Gold. This is the first album released under the moniker "Sir Ari".

== Track listing ==
1. Flesh & Blood
2. Make My Body Rock
3. Play My F**kn Record
4. My Favorite Religion
5. Over The Internet
6. Out Dancing (featuring Adam Joseph)
7. Stay in This
8. Sparkle (featuring Sarah Dash)
9. If I Steal Your Boyfriend (featuring Mila Jam and Peppermint)
10. New York Attitude
11. Epilogue: Spirit Technology

== Personnel ==
- Producer: Ari Gold, Sarah Dash, Michael Colin, Steven Gold, Kazuhiko Gomi, Yaron Fuchs, Brandin Pope, Ido Zmishlany
- Video Director: Colly Carver, Aaron Cobbett, Duane Cramer, Karl Giant, Christopher Ciccone, Amir Jaffer, Joe Phillips, Lex Wolfcraft
- Remixing: Scott Anderson, Daniel Bagley, Massimo Esposito, Dr. Brooks, Jared Jones, Tim Letteer, Jonathan Mendelsohn, Matt Moss, Rasjek
- Mastering: Yaron Fuchs
- Mixing: Yaron Fuchs
- Vocals: Ari Gold, Sarah Dash, Mila Jam, Adam Joseph, Kelly King, Peppermint, Ido Zmishlany
- Make-Up: Josh Galarza
- Hair Stylist: Roberto Novo
- Photography: Jason Duran, André Robert Lee, Gustavo Monroy, Edwin Pabon
- Art Direction: Christopher Kornmann
- Design: Christopher Kornmann
- Web Design: Allison Borowick, Bob Paterson
- Programming: Steve Skinner
- Engineer: Ido Zmishlany
- Choreographer: Janelle Dote, Caitlin Grey, Nick Kenkel
- Instruments: Kazuhiko Gomi (String Arrangements), T.M. Stevens (Bass), Steve Skinner (Keyboard, Keyboard Arrangements)
