= Yuli Novak =

Israeli human rights activist

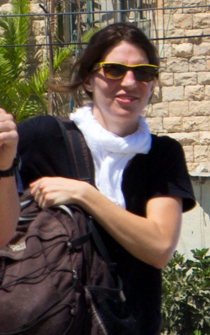
Novak in 2015

Yuli Novak (Hebrew: יולי נובק; born 1981 or 1982) is an Israeli human rights activist. From 2012 to 2017, she was executive director of Israeli non-governmental organization Breaking the Silence. In 2022, she fled Israel after receiving death threats and being called a traitor by Israeli politicians. She published a memoir titled Who Do You Think You Are in 2022. In 2023, after returning to Israel, she replaced Hagai El-Ad as executive director of Israeli human rights organization B'Tselem.

== Selected publications ==
- Novak, Yuli (30 July 2025). "I lead a top Israeli human rights group. Our country is committing genocide". The Guardian.
- Novak, Yuli (1 August 2025). "Once Victims, Now Israelis Are the Silent Bystanders Who Are Letting Genocide Happen". Haaretz.
- Novak, Yuli (18 November 2025). "Israel needs to face accountability for our genocide. And so does the US". The Guardian.
