= Screams Without Words =

2023 New York Times article

On December 28, 2023, The New York Times published an exposé entitled "'Screams Without Words': How Hamas Weaponized Sexual Violence on Oct. 7" on rape and sexual violence during the October 7 attacks and Gaza war, describing such violence as having been "weaponized" by Hamas. The investigative team, led by Times journalist Jeffrey Gettleman and including journalist Adam Sella and filmmaker Anat Schwartz, both Israeli freelancers, spent October to December 2023 collecting video footage, photographs, GPS data from mobile phones and interviews from more than 150 people, and concluded that sexual assaults and mutilations of Israeli women and girls were carried out in least seven locations on 7 October.

Critics of the piece have described it as atrocity propaganda. In February 2024, Jeremy Scahill, Ryan Grim, and Daniel Boguslaw published "Between the Hammer and the Anvil" in The Intercept, which called into question the journalistic practices that went into the making the piece as well as the qualifications and motivations of Schwartz. The editorial process behind the article was criticized, with concerns raised including the use of inexperienced reporters, an overreliance on witness testimony, weak corroboration, and a lack of supporting forensic evidence.

The Times stood by its story, saying that it was "rigorously reported, sourced and edited".

== Investigation and conclusions ==
The investigation was led by Times staffer Jeffrey Gettleman, who had won a Pulitzer Prize in 2012, specializes in reporting conflicts and human rights issues, and has covered Iraq, Sudan, Somalia and Ukraine. Gettleman recruited freelancer Adam Sella shortly after arriving in Israel in October 2023. Sella is a Jewish-American journalist who speaks Hebrew, Arabic and German, and has written for Al Jazeera English and Haaretz. He co-wrote several Times articles, including one with Gettleman on settler violence. Gettleman later recruited left-wing Israeli filmmaker and television director Anat Schwartz, whose partner was Sella's nephew. Schwartz had previously worked on complex documentaries, but according to The Intercept did not have prior reporting experience.

They spent two months collecting video footage, photographs, GPS data from mobile phones and interviews from more than 150 people, and drew the conclusion that there were at least seven locations where sexual assaults and mutilations of Israeli women and girls were carried out. The resulting article titled "'Screams Without Words': How Hamas Weaponized Sexual Violence on Oct. 7", was published on December 28, 2023.

Evidence cited in the article includes accounts of 8 individuals or groups and a video circulated on social media. The beginning of the article describes a video as showing a murdered victim "lying on her back, dress torn, legs spread, vagina exposed"'; she is identified as Gal Abdush. The article reported that the Times viewed photographs of a dead woman "with dozens of nails driven into her thighs and groin", and an Israeli military video of two dead female Israeli soldiers "who appeared to have been shot directly in their vaginas".

Schwartz said in her podcast that she contacted Israeli hospitals, rape crisis centers, trauma recovery facilities, sex assault hotlines, and kibbutzim, and visited the alleged rape sites, but found no witnesses to corroborate reports of sexual assault on October 7. In visits to the Merhav Marpe center, Schwartz didn't find direct evidence of sexual violence. However, statements of witnesses, including from Shari Mendes, Raz Cohen, and a rave attendee called Sapir, convinced Schwartz that the pattern of sexual violence was systematic.

The NYT investigation concluded that there were "mass rapes" and that these were part of a broader pattern in which Hamas "weaponized sexual violence". The article states that Israeli officials told them that "everywhere Hamas terrorists struck... they brutalized women".

The article states that Israeli police organization Lahav 433 has "been steadily gathering evidence but they have not put a number on how many women were raped, saying that most are dead—and buried—and that they will never know. No survivors have spoken publicly." The article notes Israeli police's admission that "zero autopsies" were conducted, as during the "shock and confusion" of the day of the attack, they were "not focused on collecting semen samples from women's bodies, requesting autopsies or closely examining crime scenes", and "many bodies were buried as quickly as possible" in accordance with Jewish funeral customs. The article goes on to state that "most were never examined". The article cites experts as asserting that "it is not unusual to have limited forensic evidence" during wartime, quoting law professor Adil Haque stating that prosecution of sexual crimes may be able to move forward years later just based on victim and witness testimony. Volunteers of the Israeli community emergency response alliance ZAKA serving as witnesses did not take photographs per organizational policy and respect for the dead. Yossi Landau, head of ZAKA operations, later told the New York Times that he regrets having not collected photographic evidence.

The article cites one Israeli official as stating that at least three women and one man survived sexual assaults during the attack but were not "willing to come physically for treatment", and further cites two therapists saying that were assisting a woman who was gang raped, but she was "in no condition to talk to investigators or reporters". It then quotes Orit Sulitzeanu, executive director of the Association of Rape Crisis Centers in Israel (ARCCI), who says: "don't put this pressure on this woman. The corpses tell the story." The article also cited rape counsellors as saying that rape survivors do not discuss sexual assault for years due to trauma.

Keys
†	Inconsistent reports and/or witnesses accused of fabrication

Accounts of sexual violence by witnesses quoted in "Screams Without Words"
Witness	Role	Account in "Screams ..."	Other account / Notes
Re'im music festival massacre
Eden Wessely †	"searching for a missing friend at the site of the rave"	Took a video showing Gal Abdush, "a woman in a black dress lying on her back, dress torn, legs spread, vagina exposed" with her face completely charred, whom Israeli police officials believed to have been raped.	Other accounts: Eti Bracha, Gal's mother; Rami Bracha, Gal's brother; and Gal's mother-in-law all believe that Abdush was raped. Eti stated that "there are witnesses who saw the sexual assault of my daughter" and emphasized the importance that the world knows about "the sexual assaults committed by these monsters, that they don't close their eyes and say they don't believe it really happened." Nagi's mother lamented how her son saw his wife sexually assaulted before being shot. Rami stated that "the feeling was difficult" learning his sister was raped and "knowing what she went through before she was shot and murdered". Eti stated she "didn't know about the rape at first, only when the New York Times reporter contacted us did we know. They said they cross-checked the testimonies and said Gal had been sexually assaulted. We still don't know exactly what happened." Gal's sisters, Tali Brakha and Miral Altar, and one brother-in-law, Nissim Abdush, contested claims that she had been raped, stating it didn't make sense given the timing of events. MondoWeiss said that Miral had posted on Instagram: "At 6:51, Gal sent us a message on WhatsApp saying 'we are at the border, and you can't imagine sounds of explosions around us.' At 7 o'clock, my brother-in-law called his brother and said they shot Gal and she's dying. It doesn't make any sense that in four minutes, they raped her, slaughtered her, and burned her?" Miral later clarified that she was trying to "protect her sister", adding: "Did she suffer? Did she die right away?"..."I want to hope she didn't suffer, but we will never know." After publication, Wessely told media that Abdush had been raped, burned, and murdered. Wessely told Ynet in January 2024 that New York Times co-authors Schwartz and Sella had "called me again and again and explained how important it is to Israeli hasbara." She commended them for understanding the importance to verify every detail. Wessely also noted that she understood that "there were disagreements within the family about the publication that she had been raped", but that Gal's mother Eti Bracha, who believes Gal was raped, "had already been interviewed about this". Wessely stated that Gal's "voice should be heard, because whole appearance screamed: 'Look at me, hear me, I was raped, I was murdered.'"
Sapir †	Rave attendee	Said she saw groups of heavily armed men ("about 100") rape and kill at least 5 women, slice off one woman's breast then throw it back and forth, and carry the severed heads of three more women.	Journalist Arun Gupta reported in Yes! magazine that the same testimony by Sapir of one woman being raped was contained in released video interview footage by Israeli police, which contradicts her testimony provided to the New York Times: "Sapir's story and how it changes between the police video and Times report raises many questions [...] How does one victim of rape become five? Why did one woman who was raped and had her breast cut off in the police video become two women in the Times story?" Gupta further reports that Israeli police failed to provide any forensic evidence to back up her testimony. The Intercept also reported the lack of forensic evidence by Israeli police to corroborate Sapir's testimony. Gupta also notes that detailed reporting in various media outlets reconstructing the massacre at the Nova Festival with extensive videos, photos and interviews with dozens of festival goers does not mention sexual violence or rape, "further undermining" Sapir's testimony.
Yura Karol	Rave attendee	Said he hid behind Sapir and saw a woman raped and killed.	Possible other account: In November 2023, Haaretz had reported that a man had been hiding behind Sapir. He told Haaretz that he hadn't seen the rape but that Sapir had told him what she had seen at the time. Journalist John Ware noted this witness cited in the Haaretz piece was probably Karol, but he disagreed with those arguing that the two testimonies are necessarily contradictory, stating that the Haaretz reporter might have been paraphrasing a police headline summary of Karol's testimony to them, leading to the apparent conflicting accounts in Haaretz and his testimony in the New York Times. Ware adds: "When the Times put the apparent contradiction to Karol, he stood by the account he had given them on 28 December." Journalist Arun Gupta stated in a Yes! magazine investigative report: "Since both Sapir and Cohen's accounts surfaced, a different companion who hid with each one has since come forward. The Times interviewed both, and their accounts don't back up those of Sapir or Cohen."
Raz Cohen, Shoam Gueta	Rave attendees	Table legend: Witness reported seeing: R – rape; M – murder; K – knifing; B – "butchering"; GD – people gunned down; Channel / Witness / Date / Description / R / M / K / B / GD / Link; "Screams Without Words" / Cohen, Gueta / Dec. 28 / Hid in a streambed and saw a white van from which 4 to 5 men emerged who then dragged a naked young woman across the ground, raped her, "butchered"/"slaughtered" her then killed her with a knife. / ✓ / ✓ / ✓ / ✓ / ✓	
4 ZAKA emergency responders †		Reported discovering corpses of women at the festival with their legs spread and underwear missing, some with hands tied by rope and zipties. Jamal Waraki of ZAKA said he saw a dead woman bent over half naked with her underwear rolled down between her knees.	Note: The Intercept reported that Anat Schwartz had "extensive conversations" with ZAKA members such as Yossi Landau, whom it said she relied on for accounts of some of the bodies of women claimed to have been found with signs of sexual violence. The Intercept adds that ZAKA and Landau have been documented to have mishandled evidence and spread multiple false stories about the events of October 7, including debunked allegations of Hamas operatives beheading babies and cutting the fetus from a pregnant woman's body, and that its workers are not trained forensic scientists or crime scene experts, but that these shortcomings are not mentioned by the NYT article.
Yinon Rivlin	Rave producer	Reported finding the body of a young woman on her stomach with no pants or underwear, legs spread apart with her vagina sliced open	
Be'eri massacre
8 ZAKA volunteer medics, 2 soldiers		Reported seeing at least 24 bodies of females naked or half naked, some mutilated, others tied up, in Be'eri and Kfar Aza	Also in ARCCI report, February 2024.
Unnamed Unit 669 paramedic ("Sgt. G") †		Reported finding the bodies of girls, 13 and 16, one with boxer shorts ripped, bruises by her groin, one with pajama pants pulled to her knees, bottom exposed, semen smeared on her back. No photos or forensic evidence were taken at the scene, as he was searching for survivors.	Other account: A November 18, 2023, CNN report quoted witness "G", a Unit 669 paramedic, stating that he had found 2 dead teenage girls together in a Be'eri house, one with pants pulled down and semen on her back. Notes: The Intercept examined the Israeli government's list of the victims who died at Kibbutz Be'eri as well as the community's memorial page. They found the victims in Be'eri matching the description of the New York Times reporting to be sisters Y. and N. Sharabi, aged 13 and 16. When asked about claims of rape made by the New York Times, spokesperson for Kibbutz Be'eri Michal Paikin said: "You're talking about the Sharabi girls? [...] No, they just — they were shot. I'm saying 'just,' but they were shot and were not subjected to sexual abuse." Paikin also contested graphic claims of rape and sexual violence provided by the paramedic, who served as the source for the allegation and was also published in the Washington Post, CNN, and other outlets. "It's not true," she told The Intercept, referring to the paramedic's claims about the girls. "They were not sexually abused."
IDF bases
Shari Mendes †	Shura base, reservist	Reported seeing four bodies with signs of sexual violence including blood in their pelvic areas as she prepared bodies for burial.	Note: The Intercept reported that Mendes became a prominent figure in Israeli government and media narratives on October 7 sexual violence "despite the fact that she has no medical or forensic credentials to legally determine rape". The Intercept also questioned Mendes' credibility based on a testimony she gave to the Daily Mail in October 2023 of what she had seen, including: "A baby was cut out of a pregnant woman and beheaded and then the mother was beheaded." The official Israeli list of those killed in the attacks did not list a pregnant woman.
Captain Maayan	Shura base, medical forensic team member	Reported seeing at least 10 bodies of female soldiers with signs of sexual violence, including cuts in their vagina, underwear soaked in blood, and in one case, missing fingernails.	

== Aftermath and criticism ==
According to Haaretz, "The report reverberated around the world and was viewed in Israel as a highly significant step in recognizing the atrocities, pushing back against the international community's alleged silence and hypocrisy on the subject."

On January 3, Mondoweiss published an article by an "anonymous group of Palestinian journalists in Israel" containing a critical review of statements in "Screams Without Words" about Gal Abdush. As described by Mondoweiss, some of Abdush's relatives, including her sisters and brother-in-law, stated that she had not been raped. Her brother-in-law, Nissim Abdush, stated that no official party had informed them of sexual assault, saying that "the media invented it". Her sisters Tali Barakha and Miral Altar pointed out perceived inconsistencies in the timing of events, with Altar writing that "[i]t doesn't make any sense that in four minutes, they raped her, slaughtered her, and burned her". The Mondoweiss article also pointed to a Ynet interview of Gal's mother, Eti Bracha, where she stated that she had only learned about the rape from "the New York Times reporter". However, Bracha, like Gal Abdush's brother and mother-in-law, said they believed Abdush was raped. Bracha stated that "there are witnesses who saw the sexual assault of my daughter".

In an article published in CounterPunch in early February, media scholar and Fordham University professor Robin Andersen criticized the strength of the investigation, noting major discrepancies between families' testimonies and the article's text.

In February 2024, Schwartz was found to have liked incendiary posts on social media, including one calling to "turn the strip into a slaughterhouse", "violate any norm, on the way to victory", and that "Those in front of us are human animals who do not hesitate to violate minimal rules." The Times launched an investigation; it reviewed Schwartz's social media posts, and made a preliminary statement that such activity breaches company policy. Schwartz subsequently locked and deleted her social media posts.

On February 28, The Intercept published an exposé building on claims by Mondoweiss, Electronic Intifada and The Grayzone that there were inconsistencies in the story and that it relied on witnesses despite questions about their credibility. The Intercept commented that Schwartz "may harbor animosity" toward Palestinians and felt "conflicting pressures between being a supporter of Israel's war effort and a Times reporter". Schwartz had told Keshet 12 in January 2024, "I'm also an Israeli, but I also work for New York Times. So all the time I'm like in this place between the hammer and the anvil."

Eden Wessely, who filmed Gal Abdush's body, told Ynet in January 2024 that New York Times co-authors Schwartz and Sella had "called me again and again and explained how important [her footage and testimony were] to Israeli hasbara." Wessely noted that Schwartz and Sella wanted "to know every detail". She said she understood that "there were disagreements within the [Abdush] family about the publication that she had been raped", but stated her belief that Gal's "voice should be heard, because her whole appearance screamed: 'Look at me, hear me, I was raped, I was murdered.'" The Intercept concluded that "the bigger scandal may be ... the process that allowed [the reporting] into print, and the life-altering impact the reporting had for thousands of Palestinians whose deaths were justified by the alleged systematic sexual violence orchestrated by Hamas the paper claimed to have exposed" and that the "Times's mission was to bolster a predetermined narrative".

On February 29, the New York Times re-affirmed its support of the investigation, calling it "rigorously reported, sourced and edited", and sent an email to The Intercept disputing a number of their assertions and seeking corrections.

In his critique of the controversy, former media columnist at The New York Times Ben Smith wrote in Semafor in early March that he found it "mind-boggling" that the Times "turned over crucial elements of its reporting on one of the most difficult and sensitive stories it has ever published to amateurs, one of whose social media posts would make reasonable people question her ability to be fair". The paper responded by denying this description, stating that Gettleman acted as a supervisor of the other two authors and that he "conducted dozens of interviews alongside them". Smith contrasted the Times article with a similar one in the Wall Street Journal, saying that the latter is "pedantically careful to be silent on two crucially important points: The Journal reaches no conclusion on whether sexual violence was a deliberate strategy of war. And it does not say who committed specific acts of sexual violence — Hamas fighters or other Gazans who may have crossed the open border. A gruesome photograph won't answer that question."

Per Smith, "Screams Without Words" "played a central role in an Israeli campaign to criticize American feminist organizations and the U.N. for not siding with Israel" in the war in Gaza. He was critical of aspects of the Intercept article, saying that it began with "implication of a government conspiracy but no indication of one". Commenting on the Intercept's assertion "that the departure of the Times' longtime Standards chief, Phil Corbett, was 'tied to the pressure he was under to soften coverage in Israel's favor'", he wrote that Corbett denied this as "completely wrong".

He further wrote that "the arguments over the Times coverage of both Israel and Gaza can seem hair-splitting and cruel. Few deny women were horribly assaulted amid the slaughter on October 7"; he quoted a veteran foreign correspondent as saying that "the rushed story — and attempt to mechanically take it apart — is a disservice to the actual humans at the center of it." He further wrote that it is "not entirely clear what [the story's claim of 'weaponized sexual violence'] means in a literal sense", and that "[the article] doesn't show that Hamas leaders or field commanders planned or ordered sexual attacks ... though it doesn't rule that out. The story's most conclusive details, taken from photographs of sexually mutilated bodies, can't answer that question."

The Intercept reported that in March, Schwartz was removed from a WhatsApp group used by Times' reporters on Gaza, and that on 4 April the New York Times international editor informed his staff that the paper had cut ties with Schwartz due to her social media activity.

=== Newsroom leak investigation ===
According to The Intercept, publication of the article was followed by internal worries about the strength of its reporting. The producers of the Times' podcast The Daily had misgivings about the output of the investigation, causing an episode about the story to be set aside. The Times denied that any defects in the reporting were the cause of this, but treated the tabling becoming publicly known as a newsroom leak and started an internal investigation. Going on for weeks, the leak investigation led to tensions with the New York Times Guild (the paper's union, which is represented by NewsGuild-CWA) and dissent within the organization. The union alleged that the investigators had been especially interested in employees of Middle Eastern or North African ethnic origin—and that they had been poring over the membership and communications of an affinity group of these employees—characterizing this as "racially motivated" activity; the Times denied this. The union further said that employees who had expressed doubts about the report, consistent with the policy of providing feedback within the organization, were required to disclose their private conversations.

In April 2024, the Wall Street Journal reported that the internal investigation was intended to signal "enough" after "years of fights with its workforce over a variety of issues involving journalistic integrity". It quoted Executive Editor Joseph Kahn as saying that "The idea that someone dips into that process in the middle, and finds something that they considered might be interesting or damaging to the story under way, and then provides that to people outside, felt to me and my colleagues like a breakdown in the sort of trust and collaboration that's necessary in the editorial process." On 15 April 2024, the Wall Street Journal reported that the New York Times had ended the investigation without conclusive findings.

=== Follow-up article ===
On 26 March 2024, the New York Times published an article by NYT journalists not involved in the "Screams Without Words" investigation about a video of Kibbutz Be’eri which it said undercut the testimony of an Israeli military paramedic whose claims of seeing signs of sexual violence against two girls had been included in the previous article, as well as in similar reporting by CNN, AP, and the Washington Post. The footage showed the girls assumed to have been described in his account as bloodied but dressed.

=== Call for external investigation ===
On 29 April 2024, more than 50 tenured journalism professors signed a letter calling on the New York Times to "immediately commission a group of journalism experts to conduct a thorough and full independent review of the reporting, editing and publishing processes for 'Screams Without Words' and release a report of the findings." Shahan Mufti, a professor at the University of Richmond, told The National that the statement's aim was to prompt the NYT to "eventually concede that there are problems with the story and retract it or at least correct it" after the publication had so far been "digging its heels deeper and deeper". Mufti said that it was all the more important given the high stakes of the piece in light of the ICJ discussion of plausible genocide and UN agency warnings of man-made famine. In response, the Times reiterated confidence in the article's quality.

=== Contributor boycott ===
In October 2025, over 300 contributors to The New York Times announced a boycott of the newspaper's opinion section, citing concerns over its coverage of the Gaza war and specifically calling for the retraction of the 2024 investigative report 'Screams Without Words.' The open letter signed by the contributors stated that the report had been "debunked," arguing that it relied heavily on unnamed sources, contained unverifiable stories, and included contradictory statements from some of the family members of alleged victims. The signatories likened the controversy surrounding the report to the Times' 2004 misreporting on Iraq's alleged weapons of mass destruction, suggesting a pattern of publishing unverified claims that support U.S. and Israeli government narratives. The boycott letter accompanying these demands also urged The New York Times editorial board to adopt new standards for covering Israel and Palestine and to use its influence to call for an American arms embargo on Israel, asserting that such action was necessary to bring about a lasting ceasefire.

=== Allegations of double standards ===
Nicholas Kristof's May 2026 op-ed "The Silence That Meets the Rape of Palestinians" questioned the disparity in responses to allegations of sexual violence in the Gaza war, writing that sexual and gender-based violence against Palestinians has not received the same concern as sexual and gender-based violence in the October 7 attacks. Al Jazeera English also reported on allegations of a double standard with regard to coverage of the Israeli–Palestinian conflict in The New York Times that gives "more credence to allegations of sexual abuse by Palestinian groups than to allegations made by Palestinians", citing critics questioning why Kristof's article was published in the opinion section when "Screams Without Words" was published as news.

== See also ==
- List of The New York Times controversies
- Screams Before Silence – Documentary about Hamas use of sexual violence against Israel
- Silenced No More report – 2026 Israeli investigative report on sexual violence during October 7 attacks
- The Silence That Meets the Rape of Palestinians – 2026 opinion piece by Nicholas Kristof
- The Dinah Project
- Silent Cry, the Association of Rape Crisis Centers in Israel
