= Transport Systems =

Studio album by Ari Gold
- Released: September 4, 2007
- Recorded: 2006–2007
- Genre: R&B
- Length: 58:20
- Label: Gold 18 Records
- Producer: Ari Gold, Adam Joseph, Steve Skinner, Joe Hogue

Ari Gold chronology
| The Remixes (2005) | Transport Systems (2007) | Between the Spirit & the Flesh (2011) |

Professional ratings
Review scores
| Source | Rating |
|---|---|
| AllMusic | 3.5/5 stars |

Transport Systems is the third studio album of American singer, Ari Gold.

== Overview ==
Gold's third studio album, Transport Systems is marketed as being about movement and progression, transportation, and transformation. "Go where the music takes you...and transport yourself. Ari is releasing a new album of his unique brand of soulful pop." Ari hit the Billboard Top 10 charts for the first time, 6 months after winning the prestigious 13th Annual USA Songwriting Competition with "Where The Music Takes You", where he won the Overall Grand Prize. Working with Steve Skinner and Grammy Award Winning producer Joe Hogue. The album also features special guests Sasha Allen and Dave Koz. LGBT-focussed magazine Pink said his lyrics lingered on "gender, sexuality, addiction and race." In early 2008, the song "Love Wasn't Built in a Day" won in The 7th Annual Independent Music Awards for Best R&B Song.

== Track listing ==
1. Overture (Feels Like Gold) (featuring Adam Joseph)
2. Transport Me
3. Ride to Heaven
4. Where the Music Takes You (featuring Sasha Allen)
5. Play It Back
6. Mr. Mistress
7. Love Movement I
8. Human (featuring Mr. Man)
9. Good Relationship (That's What It Is)
10. Feeding the Fire
11. Love Movement II (You Better Preach!)
12. Soul Killer
13. I Can Forgive You
14. Love Wasn't Built in a Day (featuring Dave Koz)
15. Love Reprise (Bonus Hidden Track) (featuring Dave Koz)
