= In-Laws =

- Genre: Sitcom
- Created by: Mark Reisman
- Starring: Bonnie Somerville; Jean Smart; Elon Gold; Dennis Farina
- Opening theme: "Make Yourself at Home" performed by Michael Bublé
- Composer: Bruce Miller
- Country of origin: United States
- Original language: English
- No. of seasons: 1
- No. of episodes: 15 (1 unaired)

Production
- Executive producers: Mark Reisman; Kelsey Grammer
- Producers: Elon Gold; Maggie Blanc
- Camera setup: Multi-camera
- Running time: 30 minutes
- Production companies: Grammnet Productions; NBC Studios; Paramount Network Television

Original release
- Network: NBC
- Release: September 24, 2002 – January 14, 2003

In-Laws is an American sitcom television series created by Mark Reisman, that aired on NBC from September 24, 2002, to January 14, 2003. The series starred Bonnie Somerville, Jean Smart, Elon Gold, and Dennis Farina. The series is based on the stand-up comedy of Gold.

== Plot ==
Newlyweds move in with the bride's parents. The protagonist has trouble with his fiancé's in-laws. Hijinks ensue.

== Cast ==
- Dennis Farina as Victor Pellet
- Elon Gold as Matt Landis
- Bonnie Somerville as Alex Pellet Landis
- Jean Smart as Marlene Pellet

== Episodes ==
No.	Title	Directed by	Written by	Original release date	Prod. code
1	"Pilot"	Pamela Fryman	Mark Reisman	September 24, 2002	40376-001
2	"Fleetwood Matt"	Steve Zuckerman	Christopher Vane	September 24, 2002	40376-003
3	"The Mattress Kings"	Pamela Fryman	Mark Reisman	October 1, 2002	40376-002
4	"Love is the Key"	Steve Zuckerman	Story by : Mark Reisman and Matthew Weiner; Teleplay by : Matthew Weiner	October 1, 2002	40376-004
5	"Monopoly Report"	Sheldon Epps	Jeff Astrof & Mike Sikowitz	October 8, 2002	40376-005
6	"Crown Vic"	Sheldon Epps	Alex Barnow & Marc Firek	October 15, 2002	40376-007
7	"Love thy Neighbor"	Sheldon Epps	Michelle Nader	October 22, 2002	40376-006
8	"Halloween: Resurrection"	Steve Zuckerman	Michael Markowitz	October 29, 2002	40376-009
9	"Games People Play"	Steve Zuckerman	Katy Ballard	November 12, 2002	40376-010
10	"Lucky Charms"	Sheldon Epps	Danielle Sanchez	November 19, 2002	40376-008
11	"If You Can't Stand the Heat"	Steve Zuckerman	Jeff Astrof & Mike Sikowitz	December 3, 2002	40376-011
12	"Married Christmas"	Gail Mancuso	Alex Barnow & Marc Firek	December 3, 2002	40376-012
13	"Matt Goes Into Labor"	Steve Zuckerman	Christopher Vane	January 7, 2003	40376-013
14	"Two Rooms"	Michael Zinberg	Michelle Nader and Danielle Sanchez	January 14, 2003	40376-014
15	"Mother's Nature"	Michael Zinberg	Katy Ballard and Michael Markowitz	Unaired	40376-015
