= Anat Biletzki =

Israeli activist

Anat Biletzki (Hebrew: ענת בילצקי; born 1952) is a professor of philosophy at Tel Aviv University and Quinnipiac University in Hamden, CT. She has written (Over)Interpreting Wittgenstein (Springer Netherlands, 2012) and Talking Wolves: Thomas Hobbes on the Language of Politics and the Politics of Language (Springer Netherlands, 2013).

Biletzki was born in Jerusalem. She was a member of B'tselem, an Israeli human rights NGO, acting as chairperson from 2001 to 2006, and has served as a B'tselem Board member since 1995.

Biletzki is a member of the executive board of FFIPP-I (Faculty for Israeli-Palestinian Peace International), which describes itself as "a network of Palestinian, Israeli, and International faculty, and students, working in solidarity for a complete end of the occupation and just peace."

Biletzki distinguishes between "Jewish Israel" and Israel as a nation. In a New York Times opinion piece she writes that "[the 2015 minority government bloc] holds a Jewish, nationalistic agenda," and "norms of exclusive Jewish rights and exclusion of Arab citizens" are inherent to Zionism. She says the same for Prime Minister Benjamin Netanyahu's assertion that a two-state solution would never be implemented during his tenure and his concern over large numbers of Israeli Arabs going to the voting booths.
