= Jeffrey Gettleman =

American journalist (born 1971)

- Born: July 22, 1971 (age 55); Chicago, Illinois, U.S.
- Education: Cornell University (AB); University of Oxford (MA)
- Occupation: Journalist
- Notable credit(s): The New York Times, Los Angeles Times, St. Petersburg Times, Cherwell
- Spouse: Courtenay Morris (m. 2005)

Jeffrey A. Gettleman (born July 22, 1971) is an American Pulitzer Prize-winning journalist who works for The New York Times. From 2021 he has been a New York Times global correspondent based in London. From 2018 to 2021, he was The New York Times South Asia bureau chief based in New Delhi. From 2006 to July 2017, he was their East Africa bureau chief.

== Early life and education ==
Jeffrey was born in 1971 in a Jewish family in Chicago. His father Robert William Gettleman (b. 1943), was a judge of the United States District Court for the Northern District of Illinois, and his mother, Joyce R. Gettleman, was a psychotherapist with a private practice in Evanston. Gettleman's sister Lynn Gettleman Chehab is a physician.

Gettleman graduated from Evanston Township High School in 1989, and Cornell University in 1994 with a B.A. in Philosophy. Initially, he did not know what he wanted to do after graduation, so he took a leave of absence to backpack around the world, which he says helped set his life trajectory. However, when a professor suggested journalism as a profession, he scoffed at the notion, saying "That was the dumbest idea I had heard... who wants to work for a boring newspaper?". Beginning in 1994, he was a communications officer for the Save the Children organization in Addis Ababa.

After his graduation from Cornell, Gettleman received a Marshall Scholarship to attend Oxford University, where he received a master's degree in Philosophy in June 1996. While at Oxford, he was the first American editor of Cherwell, the university's student newspaper.

== Career ==
Gettleman began his journalism career as a city hall and police reporter for the St. Petersburg Times from 1997 to 1998. In 1999, he transferred to the Los Angeles Times as a general assignment reporter. He became bureau chief in Atlanta two years later, and was also a war correspondent for the broadsheet in Afghanistan and the Middle East.

In 2002, Gettleman joined The New York Times as a domestic correspondent in Atlanta, where he later became bureau chief. In 2003, he began reporting from Iraq, and did a total of five tours. After a stint as a reporter for the paper's Metro desk in 2004, he became a foreign correspondent in July 2006 for the Nairobi-based East Africa bureau of The New York Times. In August 2006, he was named bureau chief.

Gettleman has covered over ten countries, often under difficult circumstances. He has focused the majority of his work on events in Congo, Kenya and Tanzania in East-Central Africa, where he has reported on atrocities involving rape and mutilation, and ritualized murders of albinos, among other issues. Jack Shafer has dubbed his approach toward such difficult stories as straightforward and non-cynical, colloquially naming it the "Gettleman method".

He has also covered conflicts in Sudan, Ethiopia, Somalia, Egypt, and Yemen. In early 2004, Gettleman, along with photographer Lynsey Addario, was abducted for several hours by militants in Fallujah. According to Gettleman, the pair were eventually released because he had successfully posed as Greek and concealed his passport in Addario's trousers, where he had guessed his captors would not search.

Gettleman also has served as a commentator on CNN, BBC, PBS, NPR and ABC.

In 2017, Gettleman published a memoir, titled Love, Africa: A Memoir of Romance, War, and Survival.

In 2024, Gettleman co-wrote a series of articles with Anat Schwartz and Adam Sella describing sexual violence during the October 7 attacks. Following internal discussion at The New York Times, an episode of The Daily podcast featuring Gettleman's reporting was pulled and a new episode was drafted.

The Times responded to criticism of the investigative project, "Screams Without Words," by issuing a statement saying “We remain confident in the accuracy of our reporting and stand by the team’s investigation which was rigorously reported, sourced and edited." Subsequent investigations by United Nations officials found similar evidence of sexual violence and Hamas leaders were charged by the International Criminal Court for rape.

== View on journalism ==
In a panel at Columbia University discussing sexual violence in conflict, Gettleman argued that journalism’s role is not simply to prove allegations, but to document what happened and give those affected a voice. He said:

"We interviewed almost 200 people over the course of two months. And what we found — I don’t want to even use the word ‘evidence,’ because evidence is almost like a legal term that suggests you’re trying to prove an allegation or prove a case in court. That's not my role. We all have our roles, and my role is to is to document, is to present information, is to give people a voice – and we found information along the entire chain of violence, of sexual violence…. We're piecing together what may have happened from the physical evidence left behind of this massacre".

== Personal life ==
Gettleman is married to Courtenay Morris, a former assistant public defender who is now a web producer for The New York Times. The couple first met while attending Cornell University. The wedding was held on October 29, 2005 at their home in Hoboken, New Jersey, with Gettleman's father officiating at the ceremony.

== Awards ==
- First place for general reporting by Florida Press Club (1997)
- First place for spot news by Tampa Bay Society of Professional Journalists (1997 and 1998)
- Los Angeles Times Editorial Award for Breaking News (2001)
- Overseas Press Club Award (2003)
- Overseas Press Club Award (2008)
- George Polk Award for International Reporting (2011)
- Pulitzer Prize for International Reporting (2012)
