= The Remixes (Ari Gold album) =

Remix album by Ari Gold
- Released: April 6, 2005
- Recorded: 2004
- Genre: electronica, pop
- Length: 48:26
- Label: Gold 18 Records
- Producer: Ari Gold, Solar City, JKriv, M@d Matt, Rhythm DB, Seven Sun

Ari Gold chronology
Space Under Sun (2004)	The Remixes (2005)	Transport Systems (2007)

The Remixes is first remix album of American singer, Ari Gold. It was released in 2005.

== Overview ==
Ari Gold's first full length remix album and was named the No. 2 Best Independent Release of 2005 according to national magazine The Advocate. The album includes selections from "Ari Gold" and "Space Under Sun". The first single, "Love Will Take Over" instantly became a Billboard Dance Chart hit, a pride anthem on iTunes Essentials and has been played on the nationally syndicated radio show, Radio With a Twist. The "Love Will Take Over" video has been played on HBO Zone, Rock America, For Promo Only and claimed the top spot for two weeks in a row on MTV's Logo.

The CD includes new dance mixes of the club and video hit "Wave Of You", the gay anthem "He's on My Team", "Funk That Ship", and the ballad "Bashert (Meant To Be)" as well as new mixes of "Love Will Take Over" by Solar City, JKriv, M@d Matt, Rhythm DB, and Seven Sun.

== Track listing ==
1. Love Will Take Over (JKriv's Love Lounge Radio Mix)
2. Wave Of You (Twisted Dee's Undertow Mix 05)
3. Bashert (Meant To Be) (Genny Random RMX)
4. Love Will Take Over (Solar City 12" Anthem)
5. He's on My Team (Scotty K.Funked Up House Mix) (featuring Kendra Ross)
6. Funk That Ship (2fabu Funky Mix)
7. Love Will Take Over (Seven Sun Trance Mix)
8. Love Will Take Over (Mad M@!& Rhythm DB Deep Club Remix)
