= Sexual abuse of animals =

Sexual abuse of animals occurs when an individual sexually exploits a non-human animal.

== Zoophilia ==
Zoophilia is a paraphilia involving sexual attraction to non-human animals. One such individual is Douglas Spink, who was convicted of allegedly owning a bestiality farm in which several animals such as dogs, horses and mice were found.

== Use of animals for sexual assault of humans ==
=== Dogs ===
During the Holocaust, German officer Klaus Barbie, who became known as the "Butcher of Lyon", was involved in torturing prisoners. This included training German shepherd dogs to bite and using them to rape naked women. Olga Lengyel, who was a prisoner at the Auschwitz-Birkenau concentration camp, reported that girls were raped by dogs trained by the Nazis if they collapsed from exhaustion laboring in the quarries. Bela Yaari Hazan, who was also imprisoned in Birkenau, reported that girls were dragged to the forest while they were laboring the field to be raped by dogs. Another Holocaust survivor, Rachel Hanan, who was imprisoned in the Duderstadt and Theresienstadt camps reported that girls were raped by trained dogs as punishment.

During the military dictatorship in Chile, Ingrid Olderock, an agent of the Dirección de Inteligencia Nacional (the Chilean Secret Police), was involved in torture at the detention center, Venda Sexy, which was known for sexual abuse. She used a German Shepherd named Volodia to sexually assault female inmates. Olderock became known as “the woman of the dogs”.

According to Lawrence Wright, Al-Qaeda member Ayman al-Zawahiri was tortured while imprisoned in Egypt in the 1980s and Egyptian intelligence officers trained dogs to rape prisoners.

In the Central African Republic Civil War, French peacekeepers were reported to have tied up four girls and forcing them to have sex with a dog among other sexual abuses. One was reported to have died and was labeled the 'Sangaris dog' by the community.

Allegations of canine rape of Palestinians in Israeli custody and allegations of dogs trained to sexually assault Palestinians have been recorded in a 2024 Al-Jazeera Investigations documentary, a 2025 Palestinian Centre for Human Rights report, a 2025 Middle East Eye investigation, and Nicholas Kristof's May 2026 opinion piece "The Silence That Meets the Rape of Palestinians" published in The New York Times.

Tourists engaging in child sex tourism in Kenya are reported to pay to film acts involving girls with dogs in hidden away locations.

=== Donkeys ===
The Israeli human rights group B'tselem reported of a Palestinian forced to have sex with a donkey by Israeli police.
