= Anat Schwartz =

Israeli film director and writer (born 1978)

- ענת שוורץ
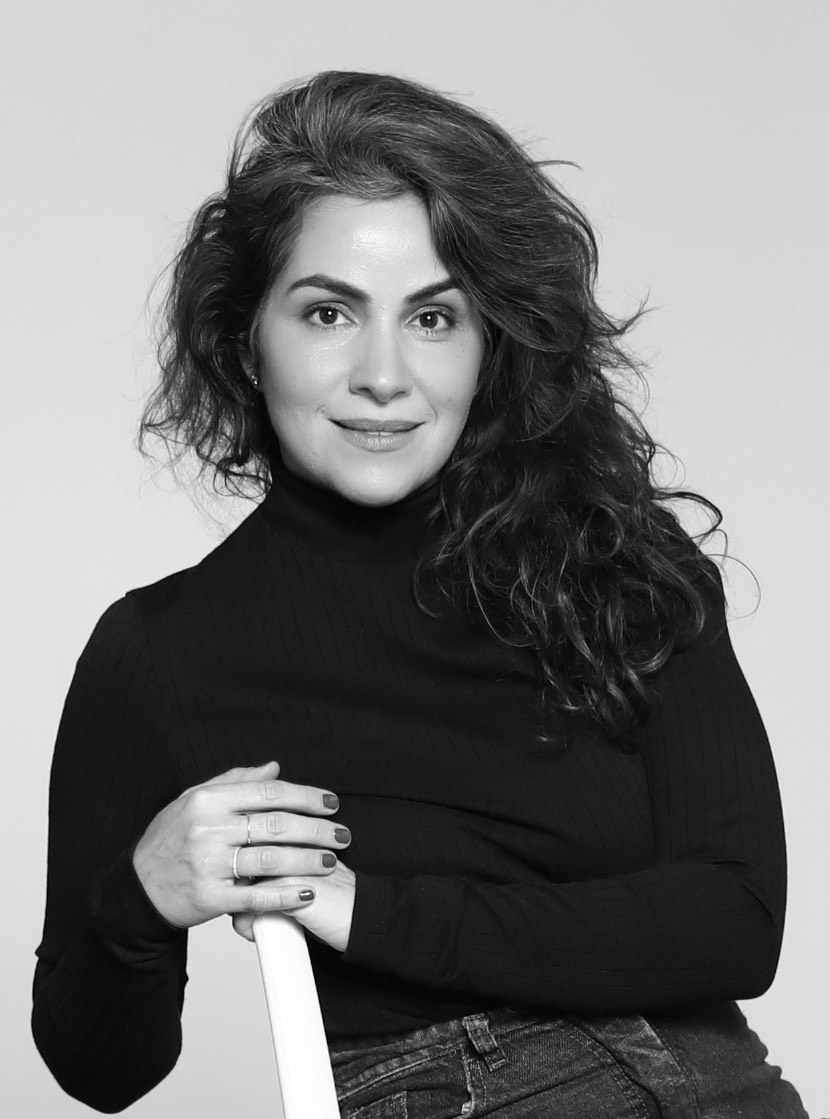
- Born: 1978 (age 47–48); Haifa, Israel
- Education: Tel Aviv University
- Occupations: Filmmaker, television director, data analyst, freelance writer

Anat Schwartz (Hebrew: עֲנָת שְׁוַרְץ; born 1978) is an Israeli filmmaker, television director, data analyst, and freelance writer. Her films and the films she worked on, comprising mostly short documentary and narrative films, have been screened at major festivals, including the Cannes Film Festival. She gained significant media attention outside of her film work in 2024, in the context of broader controversies around the Media coverage of the Gaza war, as one of the authors of "Screams Without Words" – a New York Times article about sexual and gender-based violence in the 7 October attack on Israel – which was heavily criticized for the quality of its reporting, which further led to a social media controversy and dissent within the paper.

== Early life and education ==
Schwartz was born in Haifa in 1978, and raised in Ramat Ef'al. She graduated from Sam Spiegel Film and Television School in Jerusalem and attended a summer university course at La Femis in Paris. She additionally received a BA cum laude in philosophy and literature at Tel Aviv University. She received various scholarships, including a scholarship from the International Documentary Film Festival Amsterdam. Schwartz holds an MFA from the Steve Tisch School of Film and Television, Tel Aviv University.

Schwartz has served in the Israeli Air Force intelligence division.

Haaretz describes her as "a left-wing Israeli whose Facebook profile picture declares in Arabic and Hebrew that 'Jews and Arabs refuse to be enemies'".

== Career ==
In 2005, she produced the film Ha'chavera shell Emile (Emile’s Girlfriend) by director Nadav Lapid, which was selected for the competition of Cinéfondation at the 2006 Cannes Film Festival. She was the assistant director of the critically acclaimed 2008 animated documentary film Waltz with Bashir.

In 2017, she directed and filmed a documentary series titled La Promise, which was broadcast on the YesDocu channel; it was since adapted into a documentary film.

Schwartz began working in the data industry in 2020, when she joined the Israeli company Vault AI as a Content Data Analyst. The same year, Schwartz directed and wrote the short film 39, which participated in the official competition at the Torino Film Festival. It was her first fiction film.

In 2022, she directed, wrote, and produced the film Soviet Life - Zoya Cherkassky about the artist Zoya Cherkassky-Nnadi. The film was broadcast on Kan 11 and received the 2022 Israeli Documentary Forum award, as well as the Short Film Award at the Master of Art Film Festival.

Since 2025 Schwarz is the head of the school of Film and Communication of Seminar Hakibuzim.

=== 2023 New York Times articles ===
In 2023, Schwartz was hired by the New York Times. She received credit for co-writing or assisting on seven Times articles, most on sexual violence.

In December 2023, Schwartz, her partner's nephew Adam Sella, and Jeffrey Gettleman co-wrote three articles for the Times about "mass rape" by Hamas militants on the October 7 attack in Israel. The quality of the reporting in one of the articles, entitled "Screams Without Words", has been criticized. According to Haaretz, Schwartz was "marked as a target by pro-Palestinian organizations and media outlets. Anything she did or said could be used to bring her down. Above all, this all happened so fast, efficiently and painfully."

According to The Intercept, an interview Schwartz did for an Israeli media podcast described the process by which she was persuaded by Gettleman to work on the assignment and mentored her in how to corroborate sources. A series of social media comments from relatives of a victim's family are summarised by The Intercept as indicating that there was no proof of rape and suggesting that Schwartz had interviewed them under "false pretenses". Photographer Eden Wesley, whose pictures were used as evidence in the Times article, stated that Schwartz had called her "again and again" for information for the article due to its importance for "Israeli advocacy". The Intercept stated that Schwartz was referring to Israeli propaganda efforts to influence international audiences. The New York Times later added a correction to a previous article by the same authors that there wasn't "forensic evidence".

In February 2024, analysis of Schwartz' social media activity found that in the immediate aftermath of the October 7 massacre she had liked posts calling Palestinians "human animals" and advocating to "turn the Gaza strip into a slaughterhouse", "violate any norm, on the way to victory", leading to allegations of bias and violations of editorial policies. The New York Times began an investigation into Schwartz, stating, "Those 'likes' are unacceptable violations of our company policy. We are currently reviewing the matter." Responding to the criticism, Schwartz said: "I understand why people who do not know me were offended by the inadvertent 'like' I pressed on 10/7 and I apologize for that."

In a Keshet 12 interview, Schwartz described the research she did for the story and said that "she found no direct evidence of rapes or sexual violence", that she also did not locate reports of sexual violence when calling the manager of the sexual assault hotline or the psychiatric hospitals, and that after visiting a therapy facility "established to address the trauma of October 7 victims" she came away with "only innuendo and general statements from the therapists". The Intercept wrote that Schwartz "said she then began a series of extensive conversations with Israeli officials from ZAKA", a private ultra-Orthodox rescue organization whose testimony has subsequently been scrutinized and found to be unreliable. The Times International editor Philip Pan has rejected accusations of bias in her work.

At an internal meeting on 4 April, The New York Times international editor Philip Pan told staff that the paper had ended its working relationship with Anat Schwartz. Pan said the decision followed the discovery of social media activity predating her work for the paper that was deemed unacceptable, including one calling for Gaza to be turned into a "slaughterhouse", another repeating a later-debunked claim about beheaded babies, and a post advocating the creation of a narrative to support Israel's war objectives.

== Filmography ==
Year	Title	Director	Writer	Producer	Notes	Ref.
2017	La Promise (Hebrew: לה פרומיז)	Yes	Yes	Yes	a 3-part documentary series about French Jews emigrating to Israel	
2022	39	Yes	Yes	Yes	A fiction film	
2022	Soviet Life - Zoya Cherkassky	Yes	Yes	Yes	A film about the artist Zoya Cherkassky-Nnadi	
