= Space Under Sun =

Studio album by Ari Gold
- Released: January 1, 2004
- Recorded: 2003
- Genre: R&B, pop, dance-pop
- Length: 54:21
- Label: Gold 18 Records
- Producer: Ari Gold, Marsha Malamet, James Harriss III, Terry Lewis, Major Accident, Aaron Whitby, Joe Quinde, Martha Redbone, Pete Amato, Kendra Ross, Mr. Khalil, Craig, Hay, Moss, O'Dowd, Daryl Hair, Noel Cohen, Yonatan Razel, Soong Lee, Bryan Wright

Ari Gold chronology
Ari Gold (2001)	Space Under Sun (2004)	The Remixes (2005)

Professional ratings
Review scores
Source	Rating
AllMusic	2/5 stars

Space Under Sun is the second album by American singer, Ari Gold.

== Overview ==
The album debuted at No. 1 on the Outvoice Charts and landed Ari on the cover of countless gay magazines around the world. Described as an intergalactic hybrid of contemporary and 1980s R&B, jazzy future soul and spacey pop, the album was recorded in NYC, Miami, LA, Atlanta, London, and Israel. The subject matter ranges from a guy and a girl fighting over the same man ("He's on My Team"—nominated for Out Song of the Year) to getting caught having sex in public with another man by the cops ("Caught), to diva worship ("Fan-tastic"), to seeking independence and self-actualization ("More Than Enough," "Back To Me") to romantic and sexual intimacy ("Funk That Ship," "Intimate.") There is also the ballad "Bashert (Meant To Be)" in which Gold incorporates his Jewish identity of having grown up as an orthodox Jew. The album also contains a bonus track "Wave Of You (Twisted Dee's Undertow Mix)" and the music video of "Wave Of You". "Bashert (Meant To Be)" also appears on ACLU's benefit album for gay marriage "Marry Me".

== Critical reception ==
Frontiers magazine called Space Under Sun "a near perfect exercise in pop music that transcends sexual boundaries and labels that offers a listening experience that can be appreciated by fans of all persuasions." Gay City News stated that "Gold pushes the envelope as much as a rapper like Eminem does." The Advocate said that "Gold performs with equal parts of sly, finger-snappin' sass and earthy R&B finesse," and remarked on how "Gold has assembled an impressive posse of collaborators...to frame his voice with the crisp yet fleshy sound of a platinum-selling recording" which includes Major Accident, Desmond Child, Kahlil, Kendra Ross, Peter Amato, Steve Skinner, and Marsha Malamet.

== Track listing ==
1. Space Under Sun [4:32]
2. Funk That Ship [4:02]
3. Fan-Tastic [3:54]
4. More Than Enough [3:41]
5. Intimate [3:17]
6. Caught [3:17]
7. Bashert (Meant To Be) [3:57]
8. He's on My Team [3:15] (featuring Kendra Ross)
9. Do You Really Want 2 Hurt Me [4:04]
10. Wave Of You [3:55]
11. Back To Me [3:50]
12. Re:Union [4:47]
13. Love Will Take Over [7:39]
14. Bonus Track: Wave Of You (Twisted Dee's Undertow Mix)
