= Sde Teiman gang rape =

2024 gang rape incident by Israeli reservists

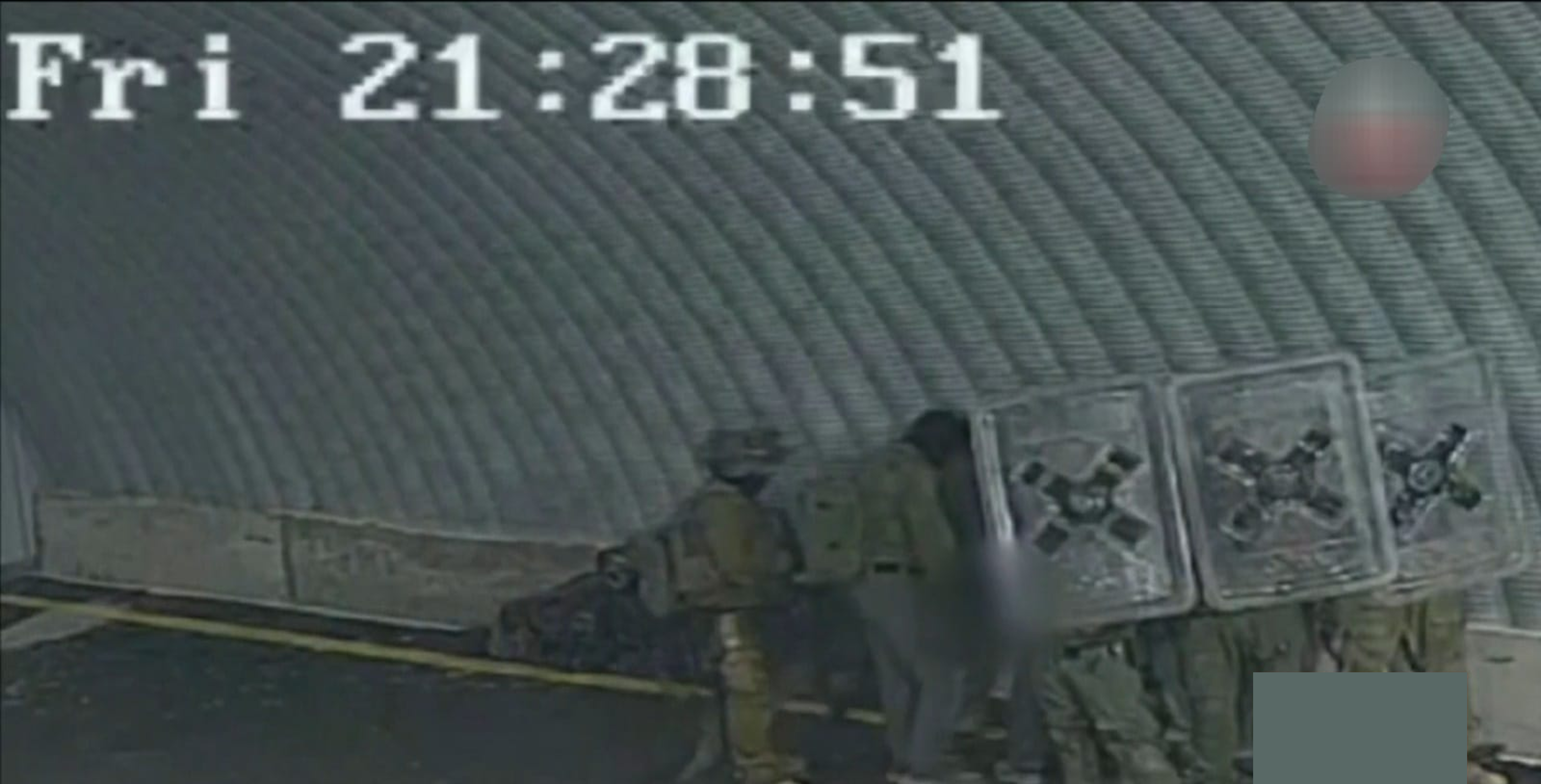
Image taken from CCTV footage of alleged Sde Teiman gang rape investigation sexual assault against a Palestinian prisoner at Sde Teiman detention camp

In late July 2024, a Palestinian prisoner in the Sde Teiman detention camp operated by Israeli military forces in the Negev desert near the border with the Gaza Strip was hospitalised with a ruptured bowel and a severe injury to his anus. He had also suffered from lung damage and broken ribs. Yoel Donchin, a doctor at Sde Teiman who treated the raped detainee, reported that the prisoner sustained "a ruptured bowel, severe injuries to his anus, lung damage, and broken ribs".

Subsequently, nine Israeli reservists, including a major, were arrested on suspicion they had sodomized him and suspicion of mistreating the detainee. Protestors, including Knesset members and government ministers, broke into the base where the reservists were being detained, demanding their release. Later in March 2026, all their charges were dropped and the decision was welcomed by the prime minister of Israel who described them as "Heroic worriers".

== Background ==
During the ongoing Gaza war, Israeli male and female soldiers, guards and medical staff have reportedly committed wartime sexual violence against Palestinian women, children and men including rape, gang-rape and sexualized torture and genital mutilation. Reports by the Independent International Commission of Inquiry, B’Tselem, and international media document testimonies from Palestinian detainees describing sexual and gender-based violence against men and boys in Israeli detention facilities during the Gaza war. These accounts describe abuse during arrest and interrogation, including forced nudity, sexual humiliation, beatings to the genital area, and the use of dogs against naked detainees. Some testimonies also report rape, sexual assault with objects, and other degrading acts during interrogations.

Sde Teiman is an Israeli military base located in the Negev desert near the border with the Gaza Strip. Multiple released Palestinian detainees have raised allegations of sexual violence, psychological and physical torture, following their time at the base after it was converted into a detention camp in December 2023. Additional reports from whistleblowing Israeli staff members and a CNN investigation back up these claims as well as reports of medical neglect leading to worsening of injuries and at times limb amputations.

== Alleged gang rape ==
On August 6, 2024, Israel's Channel 12 broadcast a leaked surveillance video from Sde Teiman, which depicted Israeli soldiers gang-raping a Palestinian prisoner. When asked directly about the video, US State Department spokesperson Matthew Miller, stated that the US government was aware and had seen the video and had called for a full investigation as there should be zero tolerance for sexual abuse or rape of any detainee.

== Investigation and legal ==
On 10 March 2026, the Israeli military court announced that the charges against the five soldiers accused of the incident has dropped, with Itay Offir, a military advocate general, stated that the prosecutors "lacked key evidence" after the victim returned to Gaza that the likelihood of a fair trial had been impacted by the actions of senior officials. Israeli Prime Minister Benjamin Netanyahu welcomed the decision, stating that "the state of Israel must pursue its enemies, not its heroic fighters."

Erika Guevara Rosas, the Senior Director for Advocacy and Policy for Amnesty International, stated that the decision "marks yet another unconscionable chapter in the Israeli legal system’s long-standing history of granting impunity to perpetrators of grave crimes against Palestinians". The executive director of the Public Committee Against Torture in Israel, Sari Bashi, accused the Israeli military of "whitewash" and stated that the military advocate general "gave his soldiers license to rape - so long as the victim is Palestinian".

== Response ==
Israeli lawmakers condemned the video leak, with Finance Minister Bezalel Smotrich calling for an "immediate criminal investigation" to uncover the source of the leak, and describing the video as having "hugely damaged Israel internationally". National Security Minister Itamar Ben-Gvir defended the brutality of Israeli soldiers, saying that any action in the name of the security of the state of Israel is permissible, and called it "shameful" to arrest "our best heroes". Smotrich, likewise, demanded respect for IDF soldiers and condemned treating them as criminals. Knesset member Hanoch Milwidsky, asked if it was legitimate to violate a prisoner with a stick into the rectum, answered "Yes! If he is Nukhba, everything is legitimate to do! Everything!" Yuli Edelstein, chairman of the Foreign Affairs and Defense Committee, announced a hearing on "this contemptible pursuit of our soldiers" while Justice Minister Yariv Levin both expressed shock at seeing the soldiers arrested like they were dangerous criminals, and called for following the law; Ynet quoted him as adding "We must not forget that these are soldiers who do difficult holy work for all of us by guarding the worst of the terrorists".

UN special rapporteur on torture, Alice Jill Edwards, condemned the video and the surrounding case calling it "particularly gruesome" and called for the perpetrators to be held accountable. A UN Human Rights Commission report published in March 2025 adduced the support provided by Israeli ministers to the incriminated soldiers as an example of how sexual abuse of Palestinians is encouraged by "top civilian and military leadership" in Israel. Al Jazeera quoted B’Tselem, authors of the "Welcome to Hell" report, as saying that Sde Teiman was only the tip of the iceberg and the abuse was systematic.

== See also ==
- Israeli war crimes in the Gaza war
- Sexual and gender-based violence against Palestinians during the Gaza war
- Wartime sexual violence
