= Havruta (organization) =

Israeli organization for religious Jewish LGBTQ people

- חַבְרוּתָא
- Official logo
- Formation: 2010; 16 years ago
- Founded at: Israel
- Official language: Hebrew
- Affiliations: Bat-Kol, Israeli Gay Youth (IGY)

Havruta (Hebrew: חַבְרוּתָא, from Talmudic Aramaic for "fellowship") is an organization of religiously inclined Jewish LGBTQ people in Israel which acts to promote tolerance and acceptance of gay, lesbian, and transgender people in the Orthodox community in Israel.

Havruta started as part of Jerusalem Open House and split off in 2010.

== Goals ==
Havruta aims to create a broad community of volunteers and participants who will offer social support and sense of communal belonging and empowerment for gays who have some religious connection in all aspects of their lives and life cycle events. In addition, Havruta aims to increase the recognition of religious gays, leading to them being accepted.

Havruta also aims to help gay people live a religious lifestyle, and support them through working together, as well as offering an opportunity for the greater gay community to share the experience of a Jewish religious life.

== Community activities ==
Havruta serves as a community for religiously inclined and formerly religious gays and helps bridge the wide gaps that exist between religious and gay life. Havruta provides monthly social meetings in Jerusalem, Tel Aviv and Haifa as well as annual hikes and weekend retreats that attract many members.

These meetings provide a space where religious gays can socialize in a loving and accepting environment.

== Advocacy ==
In February 2009, Havruta hosted an event that brought together a panel discussion of prominent Orthodox rabbis in Israel to discuss Orthodox Judaism and homosexuality. In December 2011, Havruta and Bat-Kol were awarded a special mention by the French Commission on Human Rights, for their joint effort to advocate for tolerance and acceptance among educators and religious authorities and to raise their awareness of homophobic discrimination and its impact on adolescents.

== Joint projects ==
- Advocacy project - Havruta has joined forces with Bat-Kol, a religiously inclined lesbian association, to create a joint project of speakers bureau called Shoval.
- LGBT youth - Men from Havruta have created a group for gay orthodox male adolescents in cooperation with the Israeli Gay Youth (IGY) organization. A parallel group for girls is supported by Bat-Kol.

== See also ==
- Atzat Nefesh
- Bat Kol religious lesbian community in Israel
- Lesbian and gay topics and Judaism
- Trembling Before G-d
- Jerusalem Open House
