= The Wedding Entertainer =

- Directed by: Gidi Dar
- Starring: Shuli Rand; Elon Gold; Alon Neuman
- Release date: 4 June 2026
- Country: Israel

The Wedding Entertainer (The Tale of Moishe Badhan) is a 2026 Israeli comedy-drama film directed by Gidi Dar and written by Dar and Shuli Rand. The film centers around a father trying to find his daughter a husband.

== Release ==
The film premiered on June 4, 2026, at the Tribeca Film Festival.
