= Jerusalem Open House =

LGBTQ advocacy organization

JOH
- Jerusalem Open House for Pride and Tolerance
- הבית הפתוח בירושלים לגאווה ולסובלנות
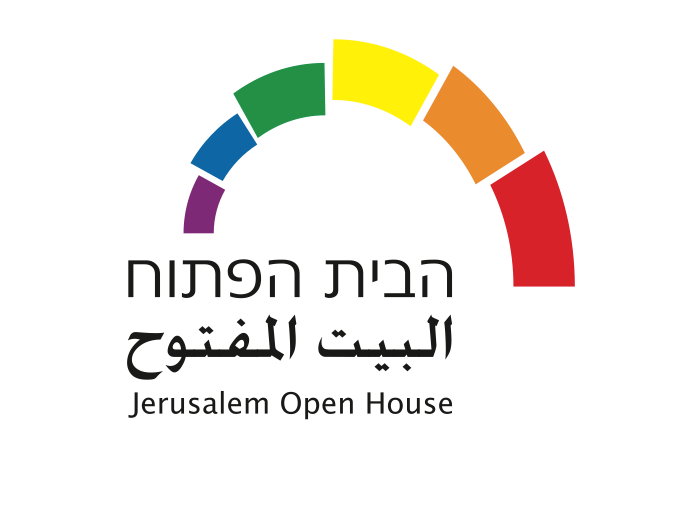
- Founded: 1997
- Type: LGBT Rights
- Location: 2 Hasoreg St. Jerusalem
- Region served: Jerusalem
- Key people: Chairperson of the Board: Eran Globus; Executive Director: Alon Shachar
- Website: joh.org.il

The Jerusalem Open House for Pride and Tolerance (JOH, Hebrew: הבית הפתוח בירושלים לגאווה ולסובלנות HaBayit HaPatuach, "The Open House"; Arabic: البيت المفتوح في القدس للفخر والتسامح Al-Beit Al-Maftoukh) is a nonprofit organization founded in 1997 that runs an LGBTQ community center offering educational and social events and a health center that provides physical and mental care. Since 2002, JOH has also organized an annual Jerusalem Pride march.

== Activities ==
The Jerusalem Open House was founded in 1997. JOH opened the first LGBTQ health clinic in Israel—the Open Clinic—and has since expanded to offer mental healthcare. The community center hosts many different group meetings and a comprehensive youth program. Additionally, the Jerusalem Pride parade, organized by the center, has become Jerusalem's largest human rights demonstration and has been held annually since 2002. In 2006, JOH hosted WorldPride.

=== Community Center ===
The community center exists as a third place where JOH organizes events, joint holidays, activities, workshops, poetry nights, and lectures. The center also organizes meetings and events for people of all religious denominations, including a social group for Orthodox gay men. In addition, JOH supports exchanges with LGBTQ synagogues abroad. JOH has also hosted family-friendly gatherings for Purim.

=== Health Services ===
In 2008, JOH opened a clinic that offers anonymous HIV testing and counseling to anyone. The clinic's providers can also prescribe post-exposure prophylaxis (PEP) and pre-exposure prophylaxis (PrEP).

Additionally, the JOH provides low-cost counseling through its Open Counseling Services, a psycho-social service unit with therapists and social workers. JOH also provides social workers to guide and support LGBTQ at-risk youth and teenagers day-to-day and in emergencies. The Open Counseling professional staff provides training, workshops, and seminars on LGBTQ and therapy-related issues and works to improve the well-being of Jerusalem's LGBTQ community.

=== Community Education ===
JOH offers services specifically for youth living around Jerusalem, including outreach in schools. Beyond youth groups, there are adult groups including a group of English speakers, Arabic speakers, senior women, and senior men. The Jerusalem Open House runs the program "More le Haim", which was founded in memory of Shira Banki after she was killed in a hate crime at the annual Jerusalem March for Pride and Tolerance in 2015. The program consists of educational seminars around the city to educate and create a more tolerant environment for LGBTQ youth.

=== Advocacy ===
JOH takes action on a variety of issues concerning the LGBTQ community through campaigning and advocacy. Current campaigns include efforts to convince the rabbinical school of the Conservative movement to accept LGBT people into its rabbinical program in Israel; to achieve recognition for LGBTQ victims of the Holocaust and their inclusion in Israel's national Holocaust memorial ceremonies; and to protest against conversion therapy.

=== Jerusalem March for Pride and Tolerance ===
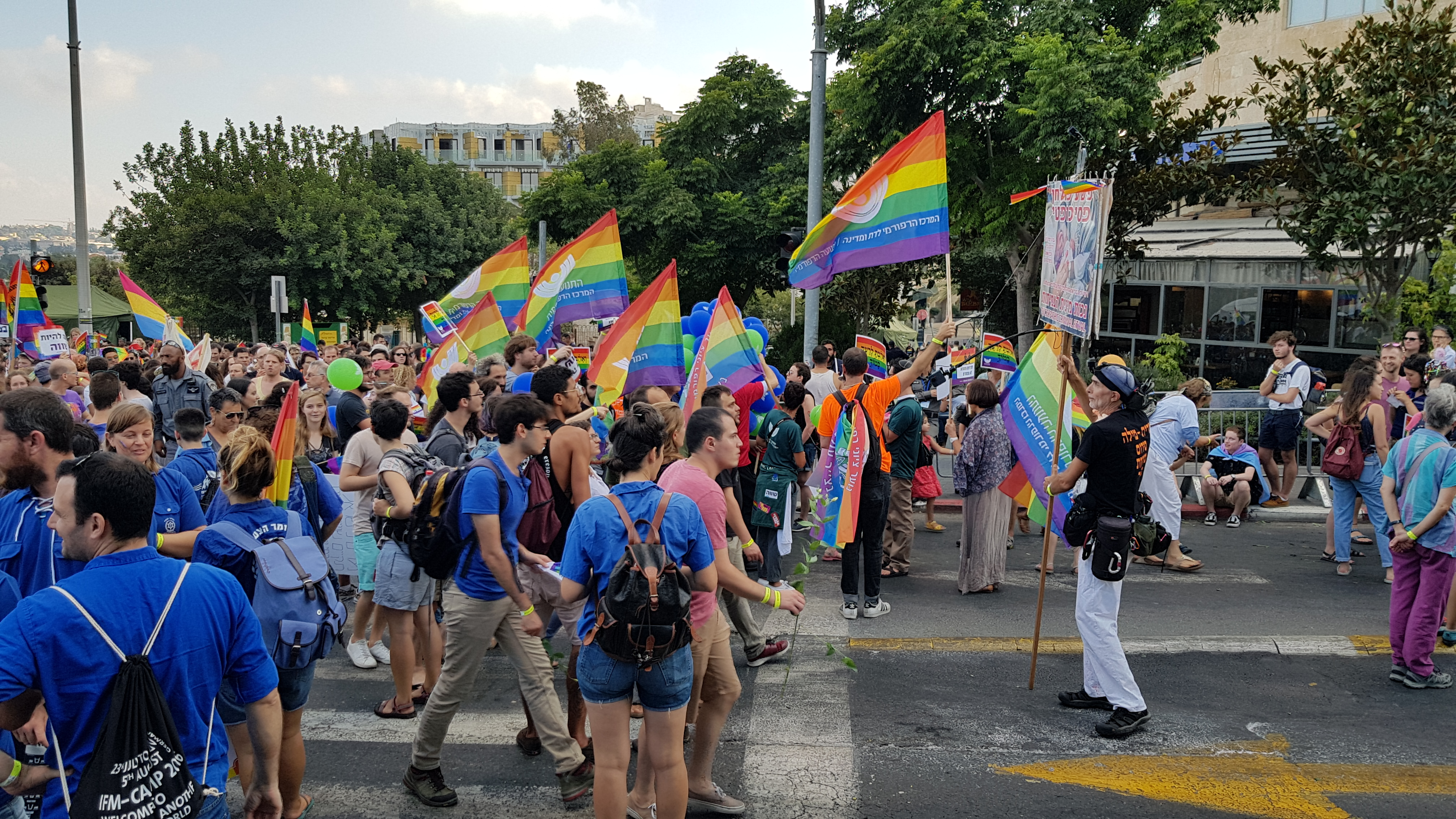
Jerusalem Pride 2018

In 2002, JOH sued the city of Jerusalem for not being allowed to have a Pride parade. JOH won this case, and the city of Jerusalem paid the group the equivalent of 10,000 USD in settlement. Since then, JOH has organized the annual Pride parades in Jerusalem under the name "Jerusalem March for Pride and Tolerance".

In 2005, a municipal ban attempted to halt the parade, but a district court order overturned it. Protesters, many of them religious Jews, lined the mile-long parade route shouting insults and displaying signs with messages like: "You are corrupting our children" and "Jerusalem is not San Francisco." During the parade, Yishai Schlissel, a Haredi Jew, stabbed three parade participants with a kitchen knife. During a police interrogation, he described the motive behind his actions: "I came to murder on behalf of God. We can't have such abomination in the country." He was subsequently convicted of three counts of attempted murder and sentenced to 12 years in prison. The Jerusalem District Court also ordered NIS 280 million (about US$60 million) to be paid to compensate the victims.

The 2006 Pride parade was also steeped in controversy. Radical right-wing activists Hillel Weiss, Baruch Marzel, and Itamar Ben-Gvir declared a "holy war" against those participating in the parade and announced that unless the parade were cancelled, violence would ensue. The parade's coordinators filed a complaint, accusing them of incitement to murder. A week before the parade violent rioting broke out in the Haredi neighborhood of Mea Shearim. Seven police officers and an unknown number of protesters were wounded. However, the parade proceeded without incident.

Schlissel was released 3 weeks before the Pride parade in 2015 and he returned to attack again. Six people were stabbed at the parade by Schlissel, including 16-year-old Shira Banki, who died. Schlissel has since been sentenced to life in prison for six counts of attempted murder.

Despite threats, violence, and challenges from conservative parties and aggressors, the March for Pride and Tolerance has continued to be held each year. As the city's largest human rights event, involving many thousands of marchers, the Pride March enables participants to shape the contemporary face of Jerusalem and publicly support LGBTQ people's struggle for full rights and life without prejudice in their city. Before the Pride March, July is filled with daily events, lectures, workshops, and parties celebrating Pride and Tolerance in Jerusalem.

== Controversy ==
The JOH has been involved in some controversy, both within Israel and in the United States.

In 2014, JOH was erroneously brought up in relation to the kidnapping and murder of Muhammed Abu Khdeir. There were rumors about Khdeir's sexual orientation and that he had been a member of JOH and that was the reason for his murder. JOH claimed that this was not true and the group reiterated that they want peace between Israelis and Palestinians. The group has had Palestinian members since 2001, although Palestinians have been forming their own groups since around 2007.

In 2016, a Shabbat service planned by A Wider Bridge and in which JOH participated as part of the National LGBTQ Task Force's Creating Change Conference was first cancelled, then un-cancelled, and finally protested against by anti-Israeli protesters in Chicago. Protestors accused the groups of pinkwashing and physically disrupted a presentation that JOH members were giving about the attack at the 2015 Jerusalem March for Pride and Tolerance.

== See also ==
- Havruta, split off from JOH in 2010
- Al Qaws, split off from JOH in 2007
- Tehila
