= Bat Kol (organization) =

Israeli organization for lesbian Orthodox Jews

- בת קול
- Bat Kol logo
- Formation: 2004; 22 years ago
- Founded at: Israel
- Purpose: Support services for Orthodox Jewish lesbians
- Members: 300 (as of January 2010)
- Affiliations: Tehila, Havruta, Israel Gay Youth (IGY)
- Website: www.bat-kol.org

Bat Kol (Hebrew: בת קול, pronounced [bat kol], lit. 'daughter of a voice', meaning 'echo') is an Israeli organization that provides support services to lesbians who are Orthodox Jews.

The organization was founded to provide support to religious women struggling to reconcile their traditional religious lifestyle and their sexual orientation. In July 2008, Bat Kol held its first elections formalized its formation. Bat Kol supports the idea that lesbian and Orthodox Jewish identities are compatible, and provides support to lesbian couples who wish to raise children as practicing Orthodox Jews. The organization works in partnership with a number of Orthodox Rabbis and others to advocate acceptance of different sexual orientations within the broader Jewish community and Israeli society.

== History ==
Bat Kol was founded by ten women in the winter of 2004 and as of January 2010 includes approximately 300 women ranging from age 19 to over 60. Members of Bat Kol come from various religious backgrounds and include graduates of religious schools in Israel.

== Activities ==
Bat Kol hosts a range of various programmes, activities and meetings throughout the year. Bat is represented in both the Tel Aviv and Jerusalem Gay Pride Parades.

Bat Kol is involved in efforts to promote dialogue about homosexuality between different sub-groups of the Orthodox community, and encourages Rabbinic engagement with the issue at the Halachic level. Bat Kol also engages in outreach and supports dialogue with the non-orthodox Jewish communities in both Israel and the Diaspora.

== Joint projects ==
- Parents group — Bat Kol established a support group for parents of religious homosexuals and lesbians in cooperation with Tehila.
- Advocacy project — Bat Kol works with Havruta, the orthodox gay association, to create Shoval which educates administrators, teachers and counsellors in Israeli elementary, middle-school and high-schools about homosexuality.
- LGBT youth — Women from Bat Kol have created a group for religious lesbian adolescents in cooperation with Israel Gay Youth (IGY) organization. A parallel group for religious gay male adolescents is supported by Havruta.

== See also ==
- Lesbian and gay topics and Judaism
- Havruta Religious gay community in Israel
