= B'Tselem =

Non-profit human rights organization

- בְּצֶלֶם
- Founded: 3 February 1989; 37 years ago
- Type: NPO, NGO
- Purpose: Changing Israeli policy in the occupied territories to protect and sustain Palestinian human rights
- Headquarters: Jerusalem
- Region served: Israel and Palestine
- Key people: Yuli Novak (Executive Director)
- Employees: 38
- Website: www.btselem.org

B'Tselem (Hebrew: בְּצֶלֶם, IPA: [beˈtselem]; transl. "In the Image [of God]"; Arabic: بتسيلم), also known as the Israeli Information Center for Human Rights in the Occupied Territories, (Note: Hebrew: מרכז המידע הישראלי לזכויות האדם בשטחים, romanized: Merkáz HaMeidá HaYisr'elí LiZkhuyót Ha'Adám BaShtakhím; Arabic: مركز المعلومات الإسرائيلي لحقوق الإنسان في الأراضي المحتلة, romanized: Markaz al-Maʿlūmāt al-ʾIsrāʾīlī li-Ḥuqūq al-ʾInsān fī l-ʾArāḍī l-Muḥtalla.) is a Jerusalem-based Israeli nonprofit organization aiming to document human rights violations in the Israeli-occupied Palestinian territories, combat any denial of the existence of such violations, and help create a human rights culture in Israel. It is headed by Yuli Novak, who took over in June 2023 from Hagai El-Ad. B'Tselem also maintains a presence in Washington, D.C., where it is known as B'Tselem USA. The organization is controversial within Israel, with reactions ranging from harsh criticism to strong praise.

== Overview ==
B'Tselem was established in February 1989 by a group of Israeli lawyers, doctors and academics with the support of a lobby of ten members of Knesset. Its objective was to document human rights violations in the occupied Palestinian territories (the Gaza Strip and the West Bank), while committing to the security and humanistic character of the State of Israel. Between December 1987 and December 1988, Israeli forces had killed 311 Palestinians, of whom 53 were under the age of 17. The killings occurred during a wave of Palestinian protest and rebellion in which 12 Israelis were also killed. The rebellion is referred to as the First Intifada.

B'Tselem's funding comes from private individuals (both Israeli and foreign) and European and North American foundations focusing on human rights.

In 2014, B'Tselem stopped sending the Israel Defense Forces (IDF) complaints it received from Palestinians in Gaza about alleged IDF war crimes there. In 2016, B'Tselem also stopped sending the IDF complaints of alleged IDF war crimes in the West Bank because it alleged the IDF was whitewashing the complaints.

In 2016, B'Tselem executive director Hagai El-Ad asked the UN to take action against Israel's settlements, which he said were compromising a peace agreement with the Palestinians.

In a report published 12 January 2021, B'Tselem called Israel an "apartheid regime" devoted to Jewish supremacy and said the nation was no longer a democracy. This follows a similar report by the UN Economic and Social Commission for Western Asia released in 2017 that concluded that Israel is "guilty of the crime of apartheid".

== History ==
Several years before B'Tselem was founded, David Zucker, Knesset member for the Ratz party, began publishing information pages about several topics, including Israeli involvement in the territories. In late 1988, Zucker flew to the United States and there he met the head of the Human Rights First organization, Michael Posner, who offered him to form an "arranged organization" and Zucker began forming one using the $25,000 he was given in the U.S.

B'Tselem was founded on 3 February 1989. The name comes from Genesis 1:27, which states that all mankind was created "b'tselem elohim" (in the image of God), which the organization says is in line with the UN Universal Declaration of Human Rights that all humans are equal in dignity and so deserve the same fundamental rights. In December 1989, B'Tselem shared the Carter-Menil Human Rights Prize with the Palestinian group Al-Haq.

Some of the key founders were:

- Daphna Golan-Agnon, academic and founding director of the feminist peace group Bat Shalom
- David Zucker, Knesset member for the Ratz party, one of the founders of the Peace Now movement
- Haim Oron, Knesset member for the Mapam party, one of the founders of the Peace Now movement
- Zehava Gal-On, Ratz party activist and future Knesset member for the Meretz party formed through the merger of Ratz and Mapam
- Avigdor Feldman, civil liberties lawyer
- Edy Kaufman, civil liberties activist.

In 2015 The Washington Post reporter Glenn Kessler described the link between human rights groups and "political entities" in Israel as "at times... very blurry." He noted that after serving as director of B'Tselem, Zehava Gal-on directed the Meretz Party.

== Work ==
B'Tselem states that it is devoted to "documenting human rights violations that come under Israel's purview as the occupying power". Between 1989 and 2020 B'Tselem has published 185 reports and position papers which can be accessed through their website. They currently produce 3–4 reports a year.

=== Israel's land policies in Area C ===
In 2013, B'Tselem released a report called Acting the Landlord: Israeli Policy in Area C, the West Bank. It stated that Area C, comprising about 60% of the West Bank, is under full Israeli control, and stated:

Israel strictly limits Palestinian settlement, construction and development in Area C, while ignoring the needs of the Palestinian population. Palestinian residents are ... denied any legal avenue to build homes or develop their communities, so they face the constant fear that their homes might be demolished, and that they be expelled and lose their livelihood.

B'Tselem also stated that some parts of Area A and B only have available land in Area C for construction, which Israel forbids almost completely. Therefore, "Israel’s policy in Area C has ramifications for residents throughout the West Bank. The boundaries outlined for Areas A and B impose an artificial scarcity of land for some of the communities in these areas." B'Tselem accused Israel of violating international humanitarian law and international human rights law by its actions.

=== View of Israel as an apartheid state ===
In January 2021, B'Tselem released a report characterizing Israel as an "apartheid" regime, a term the organization had hitherto only used in specific contexts, and which the Israeli government vehemently rejects. B'Tselem director Hagai El-Ad said of the report: "One of the key points in our analysis is that this is a single geopolitical area ruled by one government. This is not democracy plus occupation. This is apartheid between the river and the sea."

=== Gaza war (2023–present) ===
Vivian Silver, a former board member of B'Tselem, was killed in the Be'eri massacre during the October 7 attacks.

In August 2024, B'Tselem released a report entitled "Welcome to Hell," which drew upon the testimony of 55 Palestinian and Israeli Arab detainees. The report alleged that systematic abuse, neglect, torture and killings against Palestinian and Israeli Arab prisoners in Israeli custody had intensified since the beginning of the Gaza war. B'Tselem's report also claimed that prisoners were forced to live in overcrowded and unhygienic conditions. B'Tselem's International Advocacy Officer Sarit Michaeli asserted that these abuses were not the work of "rogue elements" but were endorsed by the Israeli government and prison system.

In October 2024, during Israel's siege of North Gaza, B'Tselem released a statement accusing Israel of ethnically cleansing North Gaza and urging the international community to stop the war. B'Tselem stated that the "magnitude of the crimes Israel is currently committing [...] is impossible to describe" and reported dire conditions in North Gaza including starvation, bombings, and lack of medical care.

B'Tselem published a report in July 2025, assessing that Israel is committing genocide in Gaza.

== Staff and board ==
B'Tselem's executive director is Yuli Novak, former chairwoman of Breaking the Silence (Shovrim Shtika). In 2011, the group staff had 38 employees, organized in research, data coordination, communications and administration departments. Field data research in the West Bank and Gaza Strip for B'Tselem was, until the Second Intifada, conducted by Israeli Arabs. Data analysis and dissemination was conducted at the Jerusalem office. Because of restriction on entry to these areas for Israeli citizens, the Israeli Arab field workers were replaced with similarly qualified Palestinian Arabs who transmit research data to the office via fax or phone, sometimes negotiating checkpoints to reach the Jerusalem office for debriefings. B'Tselem board members include Orly Noy, Thair Abu Rass, and Elias Khouri. Notable former board members include: David Kretzmer, Anat Biletzki, Danny Rubinstein, Vivian Silver, and Oren Yiftachel.

== Funding ==
B'Tselem describes itself as an independent NGO, "funded by contributions from foundations in Europe and North America... and by private individuals in Israel and abroad", and by the governments of several EU countries and the European Commission.

According to B'Tselem's 2016 financial report, they had received NIS 9,549,286 in donations, of which NIS 4,665,144 was received from foreign governmental bodies.

According to the New Israel Fund's 2016 financial report, they transferred $414,433 US to B'Tselem over the course of the year.

B'Tselem's revenue for 2024 was NIS 11,302,609.

== Reception ==
Historian Mordechai Bar-On wrote that B'Tselem's reports "frequently included ugly accounts of the behavior of Israeli security officials" and that Israelis "were often disturbed by these reports." At the same time, the Israeli media viewed the organization as "a reliable source of information" and their reports were in most cases proven to be accurate. Israeli military authorities also frequently turned to B'Tselem to confirm the IDF's own information. It has also been called the best neutral source for incidents in the Palestinian territories.

Critics of B'Tselem, including the Committee for Accuracy in Middle East Reporting in America, the Jerusalem Center for Public Affairs, and Caroline B. Glick, have challenged the accuracy of its reports, arguing that B'Tselem has at times classified Arab combatants and terrorists as civilian casualties. B'Tselem has issued rebuttals to its critics.

In 2011, Foreign Minister Avigdor Lieberman called for a parliamentary investigation of B'Tselem and other human rights organizations. In a speech to fellow members of his right-wing Yisrael Beiteinu ("Israel our home") party he said such groups "are clearly not concerned with human rights. They spread lies, they slander and incite against the state of Israel and against Israeli soldiers... Clearly these organizations are abetting terrorism and their only objective is to undermine Israel".

A response from the IDF from 1992 to a particular B'Tselem report on the activities of military undercover units remarked that "a large portion of the incidents cited are attributed to vague, anonymous sources – often rumors or stories gleaned from the press." The IDF letter added that B'Tselem's report "ignores the prevailing situation in the area, in which armed, hard-core terrorists, who do not adhere to any code of law, have engaged in terror attacks." At the same time, the IDF letter also acknowledged wrongdoing by military forces. In an incident that B'Tselem reported on at Idna, the IDF commented that a police investigation "found that an officer and several soldiers were apparently negligent in performing their duties and acted in an illegal manner." The IDF said it could not comment on some of the other cases from the B'Tselem report due to ongoing legal proceedings. In an interview with Haaretz in 2009, Military Advocate General Brigadier General Avichai Mendelblit praised B'Tselem, saying that they help his office talk to witnesses and clarify complaints. He also said the organization "strives, like us, to investigate the truth".

In 2010, Gerald Steinberg of NGO Monitor, a critic of the organization, expressed admiration for B'Tselem's research capability, saying that "B'Tselem really does have a credible research capability, and even among serious critics like me who disagree with B'Tselem's political agenda, their research ability is acknowledged." Steinberg cautioned that the reliability of B'Tselem's testimony had not been tested in court, and that he would withhold judgement until it was. In 2014, NGO Monitor criticized B'Tselem's presentation of casualties in 2014 Israel–Gaza conflict saying "B'Tselem presents what it terms 'initial' and 'preliminary' data, but these are inherently unverifiable and based solely on information from Palestinian sources in Hamas-controlled Gaza." In 2015, NGO Monitor said a B'Tselem report that accused Israel of violating international humanitarian law in the 2014 war against Hamas, contained "major omissions and distortions" and failed to "present definitive evidence that would justify the allegations". Later in 2015, Steinberg characterized B'Tselem as seeking to delegitimize the Israeli state and said that the organization was waging "a very dangerous form of warfare" against Israel.

In response to a speech given by El-Ad to the United Nations Security Council urging the international community to take action against Israeli settlements, Prime Minister Benjamin Netanyahu announced that he would work to ban national service volunteers from working in B'Tselem. The United States government said it was "troubled" by attacks by government officials on B'Tselem with State Department spokesman John Kirby saying that the U.S. "believe(s) that a free and unfettered civil society is a critical component of democracy... it is important that governments protect the freedoms of expression, and create an atmosphere where all voices can be heard."

=== Uvda Investigation ===
In January 2016, Channel 2 broadcast footage of Ta'ayush activist Ezra Nawi boasting that he had worked with B'Tselem activist Nasser Nawaj'ah, posing as a prospective Jewish purchaser of land owned by Palestinians, then provided the Palestinian National Security Forces with the names and telephone numbers of Palestinian land brokers willing to sell land to him. Nawi was an Israeli Jew, and the Palestinian legal code regards sale of land to Israelis as a capital offense. Nawi claimed that people who do so are beaten and executed. In the recording, Nawi says "The Authority catches them and kills them. But before they kill them they beat them up." No reports have since confirmed that Nawi's actions brought about the execution of any Palestinians.

== See also ==
- Alternative information center
- Bustan
- HaMoked
- Human rights in Israel
- Israeli occupation of the West Bank
- Israeli–Palestinian conflict
- Peace Now
- The Viewing Booth
