= War crimes in the Gaza war =

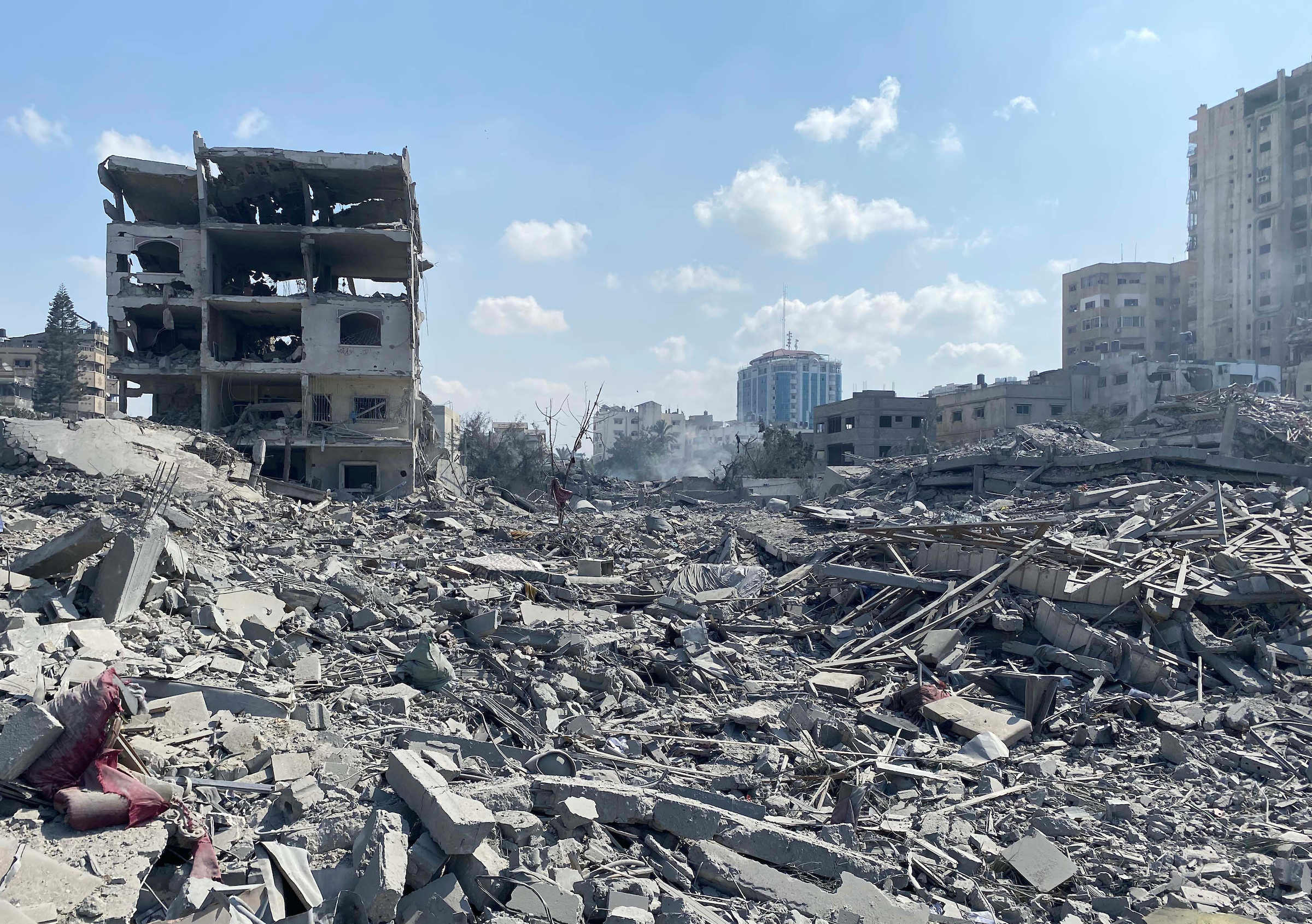
Destruction caused by an Israeli airstrike on the El-Remal area in Gaza City on 9 October 2023

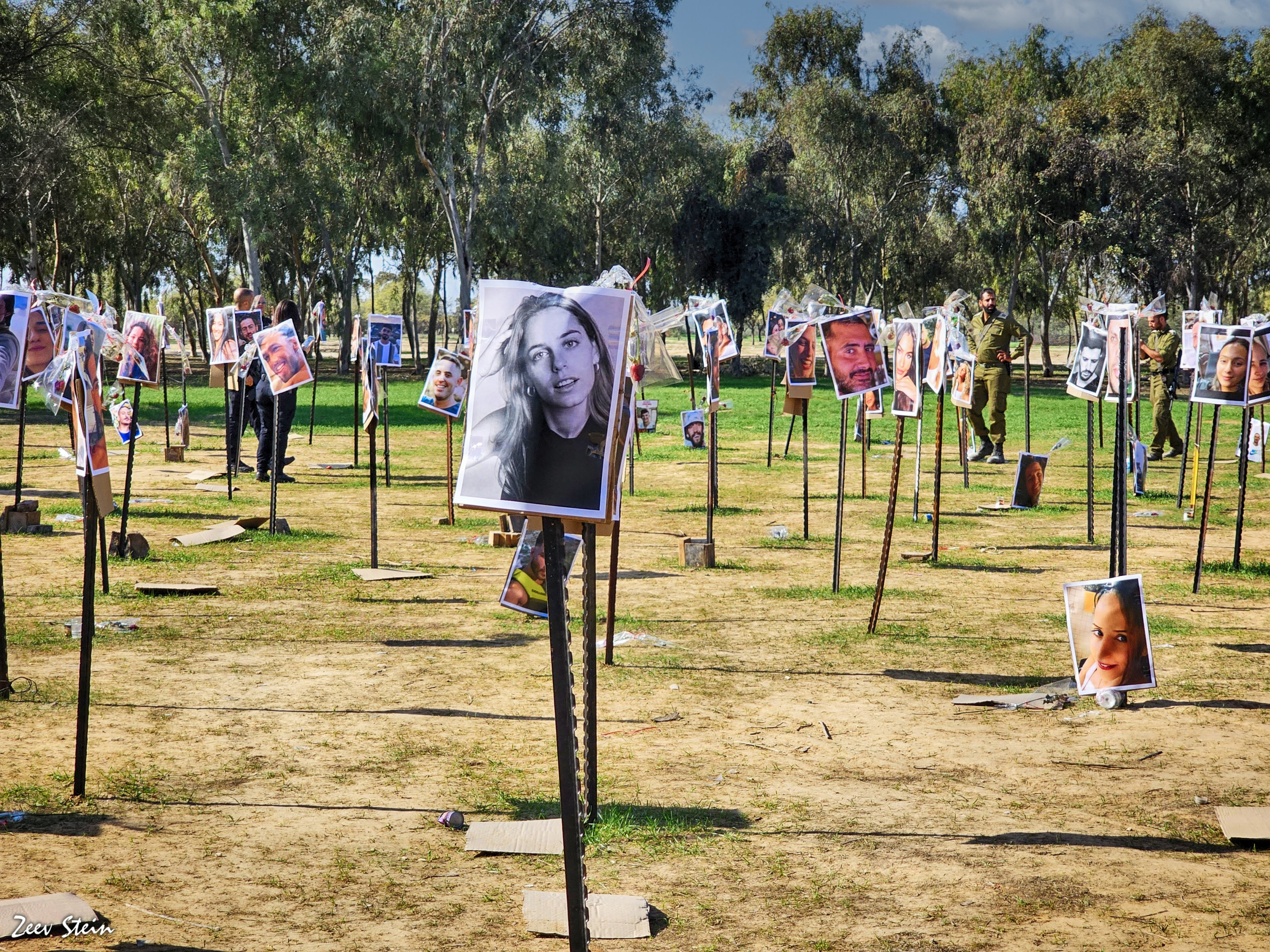
Israelis killed during the Nova music festival massacre

Since the start of the Gaza war on 7 October 2023, the UN Human Rights Council has identified "clear evidence" of war crimes by both Hamas and the Israel Defense Forces. A UN Commission to the Israel–Palestine conflict stated that there is "clear evidence that war crimes may have been committed in the latest explosion of violence in Israel and Gaza, and all those who have violated international law and targeted civilians must be held accountable". On 27 October, a spokesperson for the OHCHR called for an independent court to review potential war crimes committed by both sides. On 29 December, South Africa filed a case against Israel at the International Court of Justice, alleging that Israel's conduct amounted to genocide.

The International Criminal Court confirmed that its mandate to investigate alleged war crimes committed since June 2014 in the State of Palestine extends to the current conflict. On 20 May 2024, the Chief Prosecutor Karim Ahmad Khan announced his intention to seek arrest warrants against leaders of both sides of the conflict, including Hamas leaders Yahya Sinwar, Mohammed Deif and Ismail Haniyeh, and Israeli leaders Prime Minister Benjamin Netanyahu and Minister of Defense Yoav Gallant. In November, the ICC issued arrest warrants for Benjamin Netanyahu, Yoav Gallant and Mohammed Deif, alleging "criminal responsibility" for war crimes and crimes against humanity.

== By Israel ==
Numerous charges of war crimes have been levied against Israel for its actions against civilians. These charges have come from Human Rights Watch, Amnesty International, B'tselem, and human rights groups and experts, including UN rapporteurs. Antony Blinken indicated the Biden administration has a "high tolerance" for whatever happens in Gaza. In October 2023, the White House stated it had no red lines for Israeli actions.

=== Proportionality and distinction ===
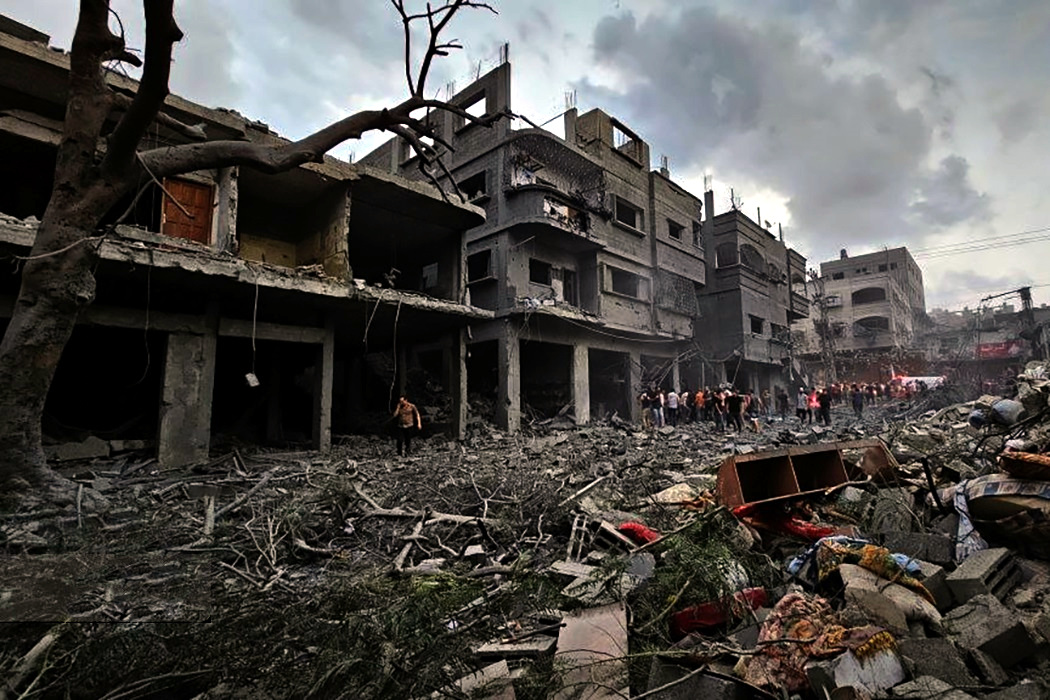
Residential neighborhood destroyed in Gaza, October 2023.

Israel's adherence to the principles of discrimination and proportionality as required by the laws of war has been questioned. Human Rights Watch has stated that the overall civilian death toll, and Israel's use of powerful weapons in Gaza's densely populated neighbourhoods, raised "serious questions" about the legality of Israel's conduct. Human Rights Watch further argued that a higher proportion of casualties among women and children is indicative of a lack of proportionality, demonstrating what they describe as "a disregard toward Palestinian lives". Amnesty International accused Israel of war crimes in a report where it analyzed five incidents between 7 and 12 October where the IDF targeted residential areas in Gaza. It found that in several cases the IDF struck targets with no evidence of military activity and that these attacks were "indiscriminate" in nature. Anonymous IDF officials cited in a report by +972 Magazine indicated a "loosening of constraints" in the rules of engagement, and that in numerous cases the IDF struck targets despite no evidence of military activity. The report claims that the rationale behind such attacks was "to harm Palestinian civil society" and, according to one source cited by the report, to "lead civilians to put pressure on Hamas".

Experts cited by The Washington Post argue that certain Israeli airstrikes show that Israel has a tolerance for civilian casualties "orders of magnitude greater" than that of the US in its war against ISIS. United Nations officials and human rights groups have argued that Israel has not done enough to protect civilians. In March 2024, the United Nations said that more children were killed in Gaza in four months than in four years of worldwide wars. Philippe Lazzarini, head of the UN's agency for Palestinian refugees, declared: "This war is a war on children". Mark Perlmutter, an American doctor working in Gaza, reported that Israeli snipers were targeting children, stating, "No toddler gets shot twice by mistake by the 'world's best sniper.' And they're dead-center shots."

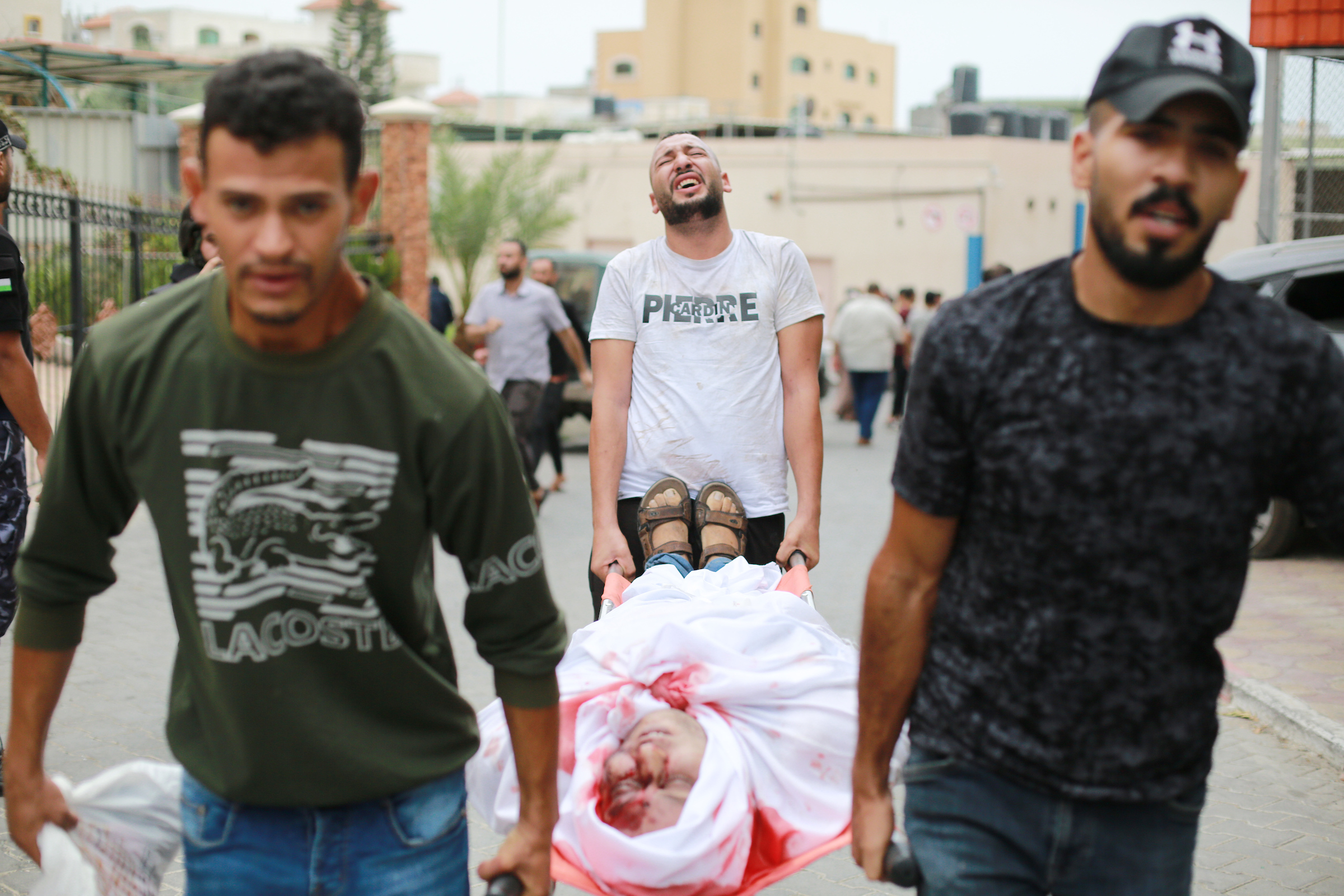
Three men carry a dead woman to the Indonesia Hospital in Jabalia refugee camp, October 2023.

Emanuela-Chiara Gillard, an associate fellow at Chatham House, argued that, given the size and nature of the 7 October attacks, Israel has a right of self-defence that could include its stated military aim of destroying Hamas, which has threatened to repeat its assault and eradicate the state of Israel. According to The Economist, the law of armed conflict and international humanitarian law grant Israel flexibility when it comes to taking military action against Hamas, but in its view, Israel's "definition of military targets is being stretched to breaking-point".

Amichai Cohen, an Israeli lawyer, alleges that Israel does not deliberately target civilians but that Hamas's tactics make it hard to take action without affecting civilians. Jill Goldenziel, a professor at the United States National Defense University and Marine Corps University, states that if Israel conducted every strike legally and with utmost precision, civilian casualties in war would remain, and the goal of a proportionality analysis is to decide whether they are excessive. Israeli security officials state that their proportionality criteria in this conflict are unchanged and that they receive legal advice in relation to strikes. Other Israeli officials, speaking anonymously, acknowledged that Israel has struck "private residences and public structures, like the Gaza Parliament and the Islamic University", which would not previously have been considered valuable enough to justify the risk to civilian life.

In April 2024, Human Rights Watch found that Israel violated international law by launching an airstrike on an apartment building in Gaza, killing 106 people, including 54 children, as there were no viable military targets in the area. In October 2024, The New York Times reported compiled testimony from 44 doctors, nurses, and paramedics who treated multiple cases of preteen children with gunshot wounds to the head or chest in Gaza. Inquiries sent to the IDF regarding the experiences of these health care workers received a statement from a spokesperson that did not directly confirm whether investigations into the shootings of preteen children had been conducted or if any soldiers faced disciplinary action for firing at them. In response to claims alleging that the report was based on "fabricated evidence", The New York Times issued a statement defending the integrity of the piece, emphasizing that it had undergone rigorous editing and verification, including consultations with experts and the use of supporting photographs, which they deemed "too horrific for publication".

In October 2024, the New York Times published an investigation claiming that Israel's military leadership issued an order allowing officers to risk up to 20 civilian deaths per target. Some strikes exceeded that threshold with over 100 civilian deaths for killing one target. The investigation also accuses Israel of dropping excessively big and imprecise bombs on targets where smaller and more precise bombs would've been usable.

=== Targeted attacks on non-military targets ===
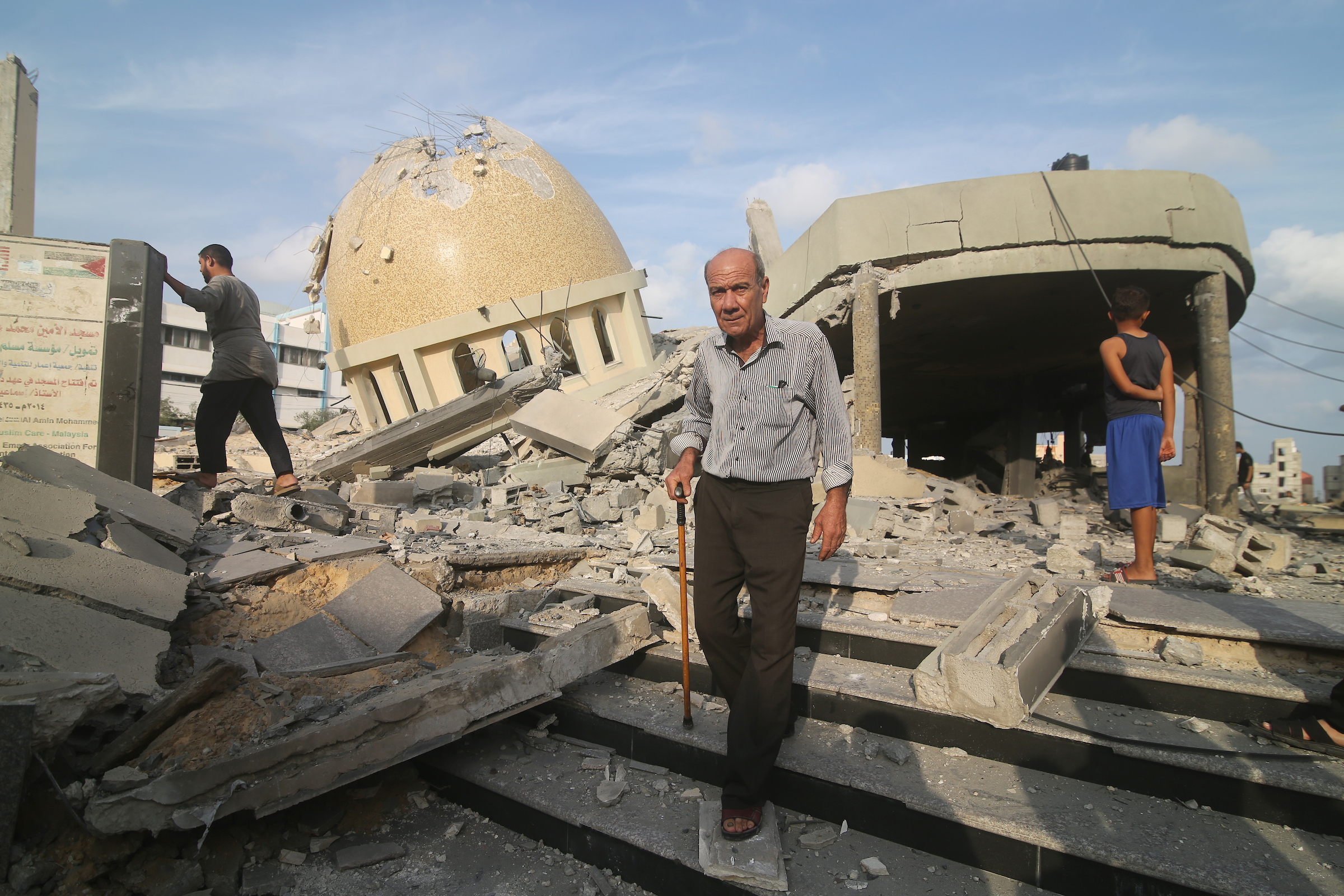
A mosque destroyed by an Israeli airstrike, Khan Younis, 8 October

In the first week of the war, the IDF carried out 6,000 airstrikes across Gaza, killing over 3,300 civilians and injuring over 12,000. The strikes hit specifically protected locations, including hospitals, markets, refugee camps, mosques, educational facilities, and entire neighborhoods. A group of UN special rapporteurs asserted that Israel's airstrikes are indiscriminate, stating that the airstrikes are "absolutely prohibited under international law and amounts to a war crime".

A +972 Magazine investigation found the IDF had expanded authorization for bombing non-military targets. Research conducted by Dr. Yagil Levy at the Open University of Israel confirmed the +972 report, stating Israel was "deliberately targeting residential blocks to cause mass civilian casualties".

During two airstrikes on 10 and 22 October, the IDF used Joint Direct Attack Munitions in attacks described by Amnesty International as "either direct attacks on civilians" or "indiscriminate attacks". On 24 October, UN Secretary-General António Guterres called for an immediate ceasefire, after stating Israel had committed "clear violations" of international humanitarian law. On 13 November, Israel shelled the Gaza Reconstruction Committee, leading three Arab states to condemn the attack, with Jordan calling it "a heinous war crime to add to Israel's criminal record." On 12 January 2024, the spokesperson for the Office of the U.N. High Commissioner for Human Rights stated Israel's attacks were failing to account for distinction, proportionality and precautions, thus leaving Israel exposed to liability for war crimes.

Analyses by CNN, The New York Times, and Sky News all found that Israel had bombed areas it had previously told civilians to evacuate to. The Sky News investigation also concluded that Israel's evacuation orders had been "chaotic and contradictory", NYT found that Israel had dropped 2,000-pound bombs in those areas, while CNN stated it had verified at least three locations Israel bombed after telling civilians it was safe to go there. An NBC news investigation found Palestinians were killed in airstrikes in seven areas that the military had designated as safe zones.

In February 2024, the IDF bombed and destroyed the Belgium government's Gaza development office. In response, Belgium summoned the Israeli ambassador and condemned the "destruction of civilian infrastructure" as a violation of international law. (Note: Two weeks after the bombing, the Belgian Minister of Development Cooperation Caroline Gennez stated Israel had still not responded to a request for an investigation.) On 6 February, the UN stated an Israeli assault on Rafah could lead to war crimes.

On 22 March, Al Jazeera released a video retrieved from an Israeli drone showing four unarmed Palestinians in Khan Younis who were killed by Israeli air attacks. Two were killed instantly, and the others were killed while trying to stumble and crawl away. Al-Jazeera reported that "it is clear from the pictures that these Palestinians were unarmed and posed no threat to anything or anyone". This footage was described by the UN's special rapporteur Francesca Albanese as a part of the "colossal amount of evidence" of war crimes committed in Gaza by Israel. The IDF started the investigation of the footage and said that they had encountered militants in civilian clothes retrieving previously hidden weapons in that area.

In 24 July, during Israel's second incursion in Khan Yunis, eyewitnesses claimed that Israeli snipers that were deployed there would shoot "anyone who is moving", causing over 20 casualties of mostly women and children.

Amnesty International called Israel's indiscriminate attacks illegal and a violation of international law. Secretary General of Amnesty International Agnès Callamard said the 16-year-old "illegal blockade has made Gaza the world's biggest open-air prison", and the international community must now act to avert it from becoming a giant cemetery. Human Rights Watch reported that Israel has completely shut down communications and put lives at risk in Gaza by carrying out relentless airstrikes and damage to the main communications infrastructure, electricity cuts, fuel blockades, and deliberate shutdowns through technical measures. Deborah Brown, senior technology researcher at Human Rights Watch, said a deliberate shutdown, or restriction of Internet access, is a human rights violation and can be deadly during a crisis. A complete disruption of communications, such as that experienced in Gaza, can provide cover for crimes and impunity, while further undermining humanitarian efforts and putting lives at risk.

According to Reuters, Israel laid siege to Gaza, home to 2.3 million people, and launched the most powerful bombing campaign in the 75-year-old history of the Israeli-Palestinian conflict, destroying entire neighbourhoods. Israeli ground forces then swept into Gaza with the stated aim of annihilating Hamas, which runs the enclave. Following reports about Israel's use of automated systems for target selection, experts in international humanitarian law stated they were alarmed by accounts that the IDF was accepting "damage ratios as high as 20 civilians", even for lower-ranking militants.

Rebecca Gould wrote September 2025 on scholasticide and genocidal epistemicide in Palestine that "the targeted nature of Israeli attacks on education – on the very possibility of a Palestinian future in Gaza – has gone beyond anything that has previously been seen in Palestine."

In November 2025, Munir Al-Bursh, Director-General of the Gaza Health Ministry, stated that Israeli forces had left booby-trapped children's toys in various neighborhoods throughout the Gaza Strip. These devices were designed to detonate when handled by children. Regional media outlets reported his remarks.

=== Summary executions ===
Office of the United Nations High Commissioner for Human Rights stated on 20 December it had received allegations of Israeli soldiers summarily killing at least eleven unarmed men in Rimal. Al Jazeera reported that the number summarily executed was 15, killed during an apartment raid. The execution was witnessed by the families of the men. Middlesex University professor William Schabas stated, "It's not really important to demonstrate that they're civilians. Summary executions even of fighters, even of combatants is a war crime." Euro-Med Monitor told Al Jazeera they believe there is a pattern of "systematic" killing, that "In at least 13 of field executions, we corroborated that it was arbitrary on the part of the Israeli forces." On 26 December 2023, Euro-Med Monitor submitted a file to the International Criminal Court and United Nations special rapporteurs documenting dozens of cases of field executions carried out by Israeli forces and calling for an investigation. In March 2024, video of an IDF soldier bragging about killing an elderly deaf man hiding under his bed was released, leading the Council on American-Islamic Relations to condemn the killing as an execution and war crime. The Israeli military stated they would begin a probe into the incident.

Defense officials told Haaretz that the Israeli army had created kill zones in Gaza, in which any person who crossed an "invisible line" was killed.

==== Mass graves ====
A mass grave with 283 bodies was uncovered in April 2024 at Khan Younis's Nasser medical complex in the southern Gaza city. 30 bodies were buried in two graves in the courtyard of Al-Shifa Hospital in Gaza City. Reportedly, bodies were found with their hands and feet tied. Following the discovery of the mass graves, UN human rights chief Volker Türk called for an independent investigation on the intentional killing of civilians by the IDF and stated the "intentional killing of civilians, detainees, and others who are hors de combat is a war crime". A spokesperson for the U.N. High Commissioner for Human Rights described the discoveries, stating, "Some of them had their hands tied, which of course indicates serious violations of international human rights law and international humanitarian law, and these need to be subjected to further investigations". William Schabas, a Canadian expert on international human rights law, stated mass graves have "always been an indication that war crimes have been committed".

The CNN reported of an Israeli military base in the Negev desert that functions as a detention center for Palestinians.

=== Sexual violence and abuse ===
Reports from human rights organizations, media outlets and testimonies from Palestinians have confirmed that Israeli male and female soldiers, guards as well as medical staff have committed wartime sexual violence against Palestinians children, women and men; including rape, gang-rape, sexualized torture and mutilation. In February UN experts cited at least two cases of Palestinian women being raped by male Israeli soldiers. Palestinian boys and men have also been raped and subjected to torture, including at the Sde Teiman detention camp, and in some cases the torture has led to the victim's death.

In June 2024, men detained at the Sde Teiman detention camp stated Israeli forces had inserted "hot metal sticks" and "electric sticks" into their rectums, resulting in the death of at least one man.

In June 2024, a Palestinian prisoner released from the Sde Teiman detention camp gave testimony that prisoners were raped by dogs.

In its legally mandated June 2024 investigative report, the UN's Independent International Commission of Inquiry on the Occupied Palestinian Territory (CoI) concluded: "The frequency, prevalence and severity of sexual and gender-based crimes perpetrated against Palestinians since 7 October across the Occupied Palestinian Territories (OPT) indicate that specific forms of Sexual and gender-based violence (SGBV) are part of Israeli Security Forces (ISF) operating procedures."

In early August, Ibrahim Salem, who appeared in one of the first leaked photos from Sde Teiman, was released after being held there for 52 days without charge. He reported widespread torture, including by medical staff, as well as electrocution during interrogations, sexual abuse, constant beatings, forced stripping, genital grabbing, and frequent occurrences of rape committed by both male and female soldiers. Children were also subjected to rape. In one instance, a prisoner in his 40s was handcuffed and forced to bend over a desk while a female soldier inserted her fingers and other objects into his rectum. If the prisoner moved, a male soldier positioned in front of him would beat him and compel him to remain in that position. According to Salem, "Most of the prisoners will come out with rectal injuries [caused by the sexual assault]."

In August 2024 Israeli human rights organization B'Tselem released a report on systematic Israeli abuse, torture, sexual violence and rape of Palestinian detainees, calling the Israeli prison system a "network of torture camps". The report includes extensive testimonies from Palestinians. The Guardian also interviewed Palestinian detainees, and reported they "back up [the] report by rights group B'Tselem, which says jails should now be labelled 'torture camps'."

In August 2024, testimony from released Palestinian detainees collected by Channel 4 found "shocking allegations of physical, psychological and sexual abuse" committed by Israeli forces. In one testimony, a Palestinian victim of sexual violence recounts: "When the female soldier grabbed me by the balls and penis, she wounded me with her nails, digging them into my penis. I started screaming and biting the wire."

In October 2024, a UN inquiry examined the detention of Palestinians in Israeli military camps and facilities, finding that thousands of child and adult detainees, many arbitrarily detained, faced widespread abuse, including physical and psychological violence, rape and other forms of sexual and gender-based violence, and conditions amounting to torture. Male detainees were subjected to rape and forced to endure humiliating acts as a means of punishment. The report highlighted that deaths resulting from such abuse or neglect constituted war crimes and violations of the right to life. Israel refused to cooperate with the investigation, contending that it had an "anti-Israel" bias.

=== Israeli destruction of mosques, churches, cultural and historic sites ===
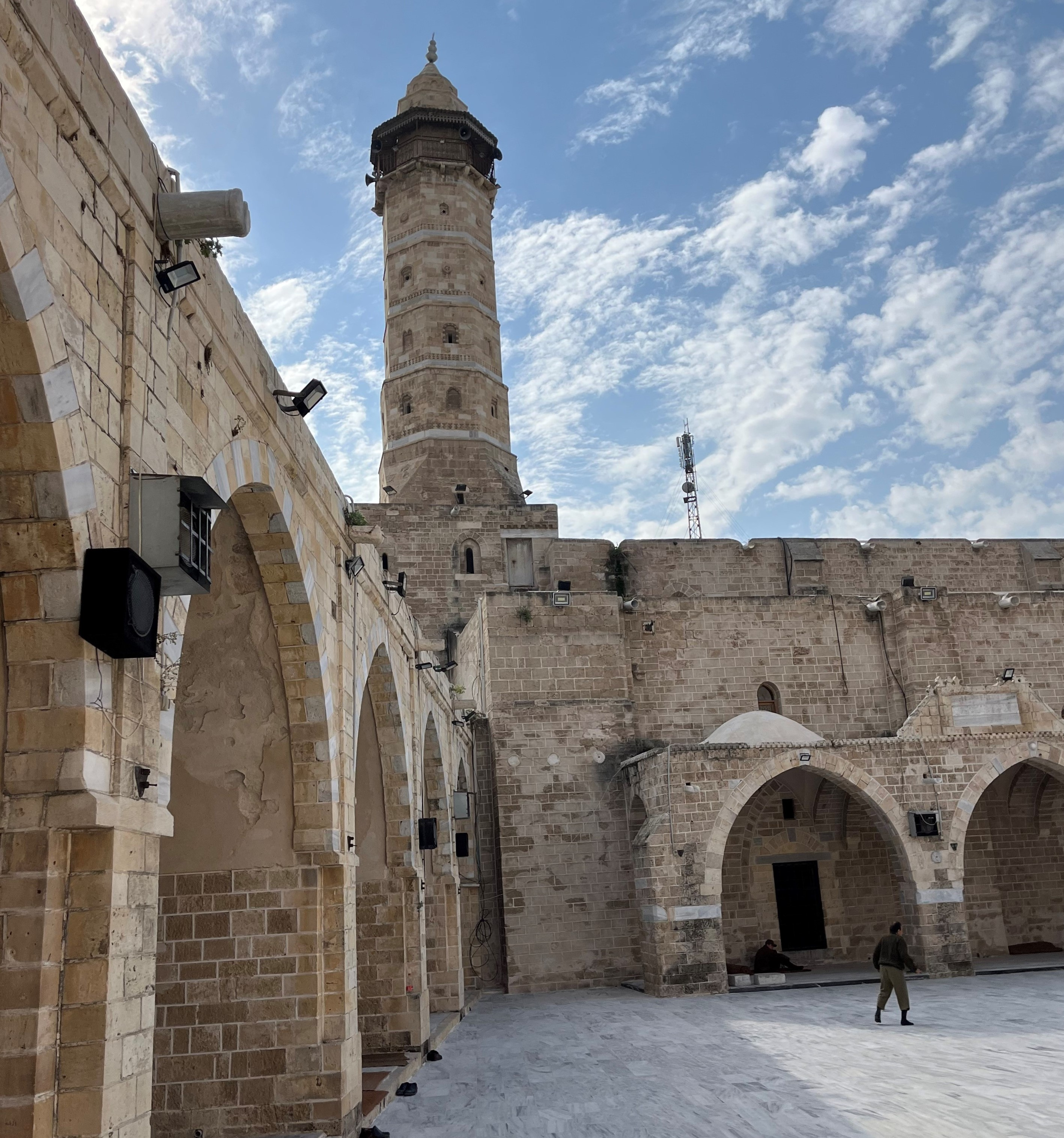
The Great Omari Mosque, which Israel destroyed

A report in early November 2023 listed over 100 significant archeological and antiquities sites, libraries, religious sites and places of ancient historical importance that Israel had partly or completely destroyed.

In January 2024, The Ministry of Awqaf and Religious Affairs in Gaza estimated that 104 mosques had been damaged or destroyed since the start of the conflict. BBC has verified 74 cases where religious sites were damaged or destroyed, of which 72 were mosques and two were churches. The Nation wrote that the destruction of the Great Omari Mosque in particular, originally a fifth-century Byzantine church, was "a crime against cultural heritage. But more importantly... part of a campaign of total annihilation... a deliberate element of the Israeli campaign to erase all traces of Palestinian life.".

=== Destruction of cemeteries ===
Map of the 12 northernmost cemeteries that Israel has damaged or destroyed in the Gaza Strip so far during the war.
*approximate location

Israel has damaged or destroyed at least sixteen cemeteries across the Gaza Strip, in some cases, creating dirt roads across them or establishing military positions. The intentional destruction of religious sites without military necessity is a possible war crime. On 21 December, bulldozers destroyed a cemetery in the Al-Saha neighborhood in eastern Gaza. On 6 January 2024, Palestinians in Tuffah reburied bodies after the Israeli army reportedly exhumed them and smashed their graves. Gazans in Khan Younis reported the Israeli army raided a cemetery and took corpses. The Khan Younis cemetery was reportedly bulldozed over, tombstones crushed, and human remains were visible. Muna Haddad, a lawyer on the treatment of the dead, stated, "What is happening is... considered a war crime of 'committing outrages upon personal dignity' under the Rome Statute." On 27 January 2024, Israeli forces escorted CNN into Gaza in an attempt to explain the destruction of Bani Suheila cemetery, through which a tunnel ran, according to the IDF; but during the three hour visit, Israeli commanders failed to prove their claim. Moreover, the IDF did not permit CNN to see any alleged entrance to the tunnel inside the cemetery, and later provided drone footage of two tunnel entrances, both located outside the cemetery. CNN broadcast footage of completely destroyed, and dug-up cemetery grounds.

=== Collective punishment ===
It is an entire nation out there that is responsible. It is not true this rhetoric about civilians not being aware, not involved. It's absolutely not true. They could have risen up. They could have fought against that evil regime which took over Gaza in a coup d'etat.

— Isaac Herzog

Several actions taken by the Israeli army, including its blockade on electricity, food, fuel and water, were characterized as collective punishment, a war crime prohibited by treaty in both international and non-international armed conflicts, more specifically Common Article 3 of the Geneva Conventions and Additional Protocol II. Israel's president Isaac Herzog accused the residents of Gaza of collective responsibility for the war. (Note: The Financial Times later silently deleted Herzog's quote from its article, cf. archive copy of the article from the evening of 13 October.) Doctors Without Borders international president Christos Christou said millions of civilians in Gaza faced "collective punishment" due to Israel's blockade on fuel and medicine.

In an interview with The New Yorker, human rights expert Sari Bashi noted the historical uniqueness of Israeli officials openly admitting they are engaging in collective punishment. On 18 October, UN Secretary-General António Guterres stated Hamas' attacks "cannot justify the collective punishment of the Palestinian people." On 24 October, Human Rights Watch criticized Israel's refusal to allow fuel or water into a Gaza, terming it a war crime. On 29 October, Karim Ahmad Khan stated Israel's impeding aid to Gaza may constitute a crime under the International Criminal Court. On 7 December, Khan again stated "wilfully impeding relief supplies" may constitute a war crime under the Rome Statute. On 20 January 2024, the IDF dropped leaflets with hostages' images on Rafah, stating, "Do you want to return home? Please make the call if you recognise one of them." On 25 January 2024, the Gaza Health Ministry reported that Israeli troops had fired upon and killed twenty civilians seeking humanitarian aid in Gaza City.

On 31 January 2024, Haaretz reported that Israeli army commanders were ordering troops to burn down and destroy unoccupied buildings in Gaza. According to Human Rights Watch: "Unlawful and wanton excessive destruction of property that is not militarily justified, is also a war crime." On 16 April 2024, a spokesperson for the UN Human Rights Office stated, "Israel continues to impose unlawful restrictions on the entry and distribution of humanitarian assistance, and to carry out widespread destruction of civilian infrastructure". The Irish foreign minister Micheál Martin called Israel's actions "fully disproportionate and... a breach of humanitarian law in terms of the destruction of Gaza".

==== Starvation ====
Israel imposed a "complete siege" on Gaza in the first ten days of the war, due to alleged security concerns that weapons, fuel, and armaments would be transferred to Hamas in the guise of humanitarian aid. Israel later allowed the delivery of limited humanitarian aid following security checks. Israel's restriction of the flow of food, fuel, water, and other humanitarian aid was criticized as a war crime by human rights organizations.

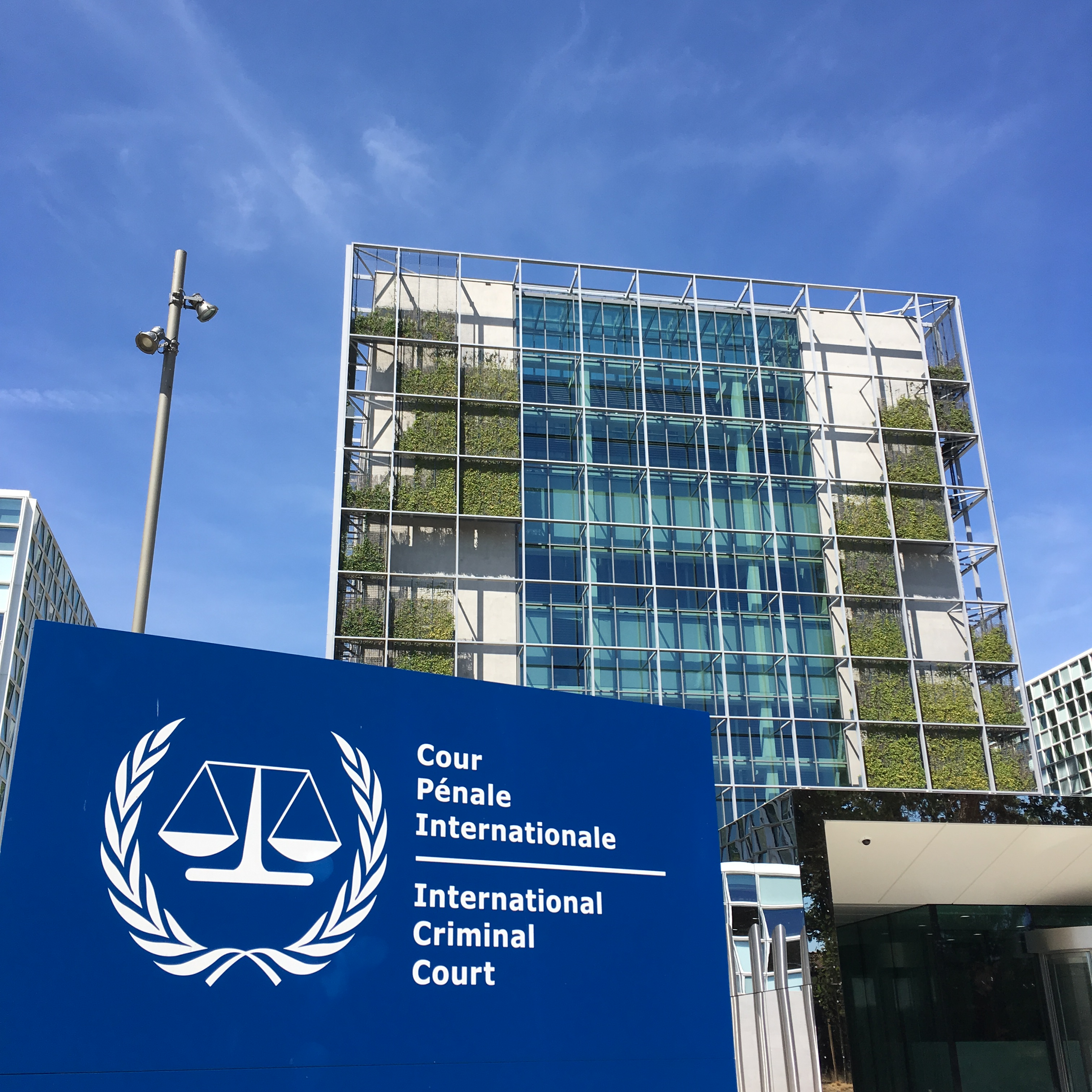
The premises of the International Criminal Court in The Hague, Netherlands. In applying for the arrest warrants, ICC Prosecutor Karim Ahmad Khan alleged that Netanyahu and Gallant committed the war crime of starvation.

In March 2024, the European Union's top diplomat, Josep Borrell, stated Israel was using starvation as a weapon of war. Similarly, the U.N. High Commissioner for Human Rights, Volker Türk, stated, "The extent of Israel's continued restrictions on entry of aid into Gaza, together with the manner in which it continues to conduct hostilities, may amount to the use of starvation as a method of war, which is a war crime".

Human Rights Watch stated Israel was committing a war crime by using starvation as a method of warfare. Alex de Waal stated it was the worst man-made famine in 75 years. Luis Moreno Ocampo, the former chief prosecutor for the ICC, stated, "Stopping aid in particular to destroy civilian life – with intention to destroy a historical community – is genocide." In April 2024, the United Nations human rights office stated Israel was placing "unlawful restrictions" on humanitarian aid.

EuroMed Monitor described the situation as a war of starvation against civilians in the Gaza Strip. EuroMed noted living conditions had reached catastrophic levels by Israel cutting off all food supplies to the Northern half, and bombing and destroying factories, bakeries, food stores, water stations, and tanks throughout the entire enclave. EuroMed additionally noted Israel deliberately focused its attacks on targeting electrical generators and solar energy units, on which commercial facilities and restaurants depend, to maintain the minimum possible level of their work. Israel also targeted the agricultural areas east of Gaza, flour stores, and fishermen's boats, as well as relief organizations' centers, including those belonging to the UNRWA. As a result, over 90% of the children in Gaza suffered from varying health issues, including malnutrition, anemia, and weakened immunity. Israeli snipers reportedly targeted people waiting for humanitarian aid.

The ICJ ruled as part of the interim measures that Israel facilitate the flow of aid and lessen humanitarian suffering in Gaza. In its March 2024 interim ruling, the ICJ stated, "The court observes that Palestinians in Gaza are no longer facing only a risk of famine (...) but that famine is setting in."

Israel has challenged the IPC's past methodology, citing academics in the Israeli public health sector. An independent study by researchers from Columbia University found that "sufficient amounts of food are being supplied into Gaza", though, "it may not always be distributed to people due to other factors, such as war and Hamas control".

On 5 August 2024 Finance Minister Bezalel Smotrich stated that Israel "bring[s] in aid because there is no choice" and he believes that blocking humanitarian aid to the Gaza Strip is "justified and moral" even if it causes two million Gazans to die of hunger, but the international community won't allow that to happen.

=== Violations of medical neutrality ===
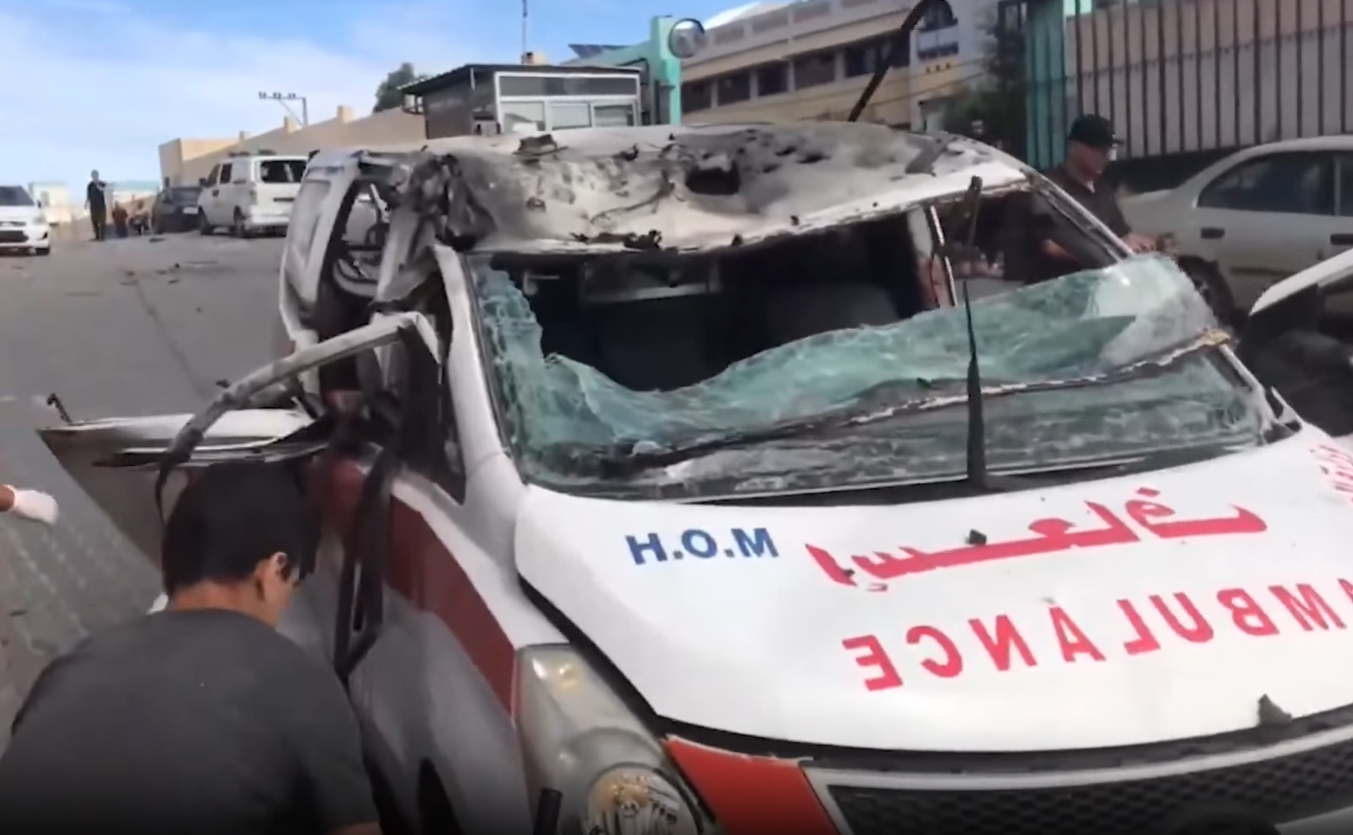
Palestine Red Crescent ambulance destroyed by an Israeli airstrike

Israel is alleged to have broken medical neutrality, a war crime under the Geneva Conventions as hospitals are given special protection under international humanitarian law. These attacks have been carried out in a manner that aid groups and international bodies are increasingly referring to as systematic. According to Gaza officials, the IDF deliberately targeted ambulances and health facilities with airstrikes. In a statement, the Palestine Red Crescent demanded "accountability for this war crime". The International Federation of Red Cross and Red Crescent Societies, UNRWA, and Medecins Sans Frontieres reported the deaths of their medical personnel. On 14 October, the World Health Organization said the killing of health care workers and the destruction of health facilities "denies civilians the basic human right of life-saving health" and is prohibited by International Humanitarian Law. On 17 October, WHO stated 51 health facilities had been attacked by Israel. On 4 November, the Gaza Health Ministry stated 105 medical facilities had been deliberately targeted. Law professor Neve Gordon said Israel makes use of limited exceptions in the law to justify attacking hospitals by asserting Hamas use of same.

On 21 October, the Ministry of Health noted Israel had attacked 69 health facilities, 24 ambulances, put 7 hospitals out of commission, and killed 37 medical staff. Health workers and aid groups said several hospitals in Gaza were hit by airstrikes and shelling. The Palestine Red Crescent Society accused Israel of "deliberately" carrying out airstrikes "directly around" Gaza's second-largest hospital, al-Quds Hospital, in north Gaza, to force them to evacuate the facility. The World Health Organization (WHO) found it impossible to evacuate the hospital. According to CNN, even those who evacuated south have not been safe. On 30 October 2023, a Turkish-Palestinian Friendship Hospital, located in the south of Gaza, was struck by a "direct hit", causing damage and injuries.

On 3 November, an Israeli airstrike hit an ambulance convoy departing from al-Shifa Hospital carrying, according to a Palestinian Health Ministry spokesman, 15-20 critically injured patients. The Israeli military confirmed the strike, saying one of the ambulances was being used by a "Hamas terrorist cell", and was close to their position. In response, Yanis Varoufakis noted, "Even if the ambulance was carrying a Hamas overlord, bombing it violates the Geneva Convention." UN chief António Guterres stated he was "horrified" by the attack. In prior weeks, Israel had released an animated video stating Al-Shifa hospital contained a hidden, top-secret underground military center. This was flatly denied, with Hamas stating Israel was using "prefabricated" evidence to pre-empt a military strike on a hospital. Laws of war provide limited protections to medical facilities used in such capacities. HRW stated the strikes were apparently unlawful and should be investigated as a possible war crime.

During the Siege of Gaza City, Israeli snipers reportedly fired on the intensive care unit in Al-Quds Hospital, killing one person and wounding 28. Doctors in Al-Shifa Hospital reported snipers at the outskirts of the complex were firing at "any moving person". Fabrizio Carbone, the Middle East regional head of the International Committee of the Red Cross, stated Israel's attacks on al-Shifa Hospital could not continue, stressing patients and hospital staff should be "protected in line with the laws of war". In response to the Al-Shifa Hospital siege, Human Rights Watch stated Israel's actions against hospitals need to be investigated as war crimes. Jennifer Cassidy, a legal expert at University of Oxford, stated Israel's siege on al-Shifa was a war crime "plain and simple". Following an Israeli attack on Indonesia Hospital, the Indonesian Foreign Minister called it a clear violation of international humanitarian law.

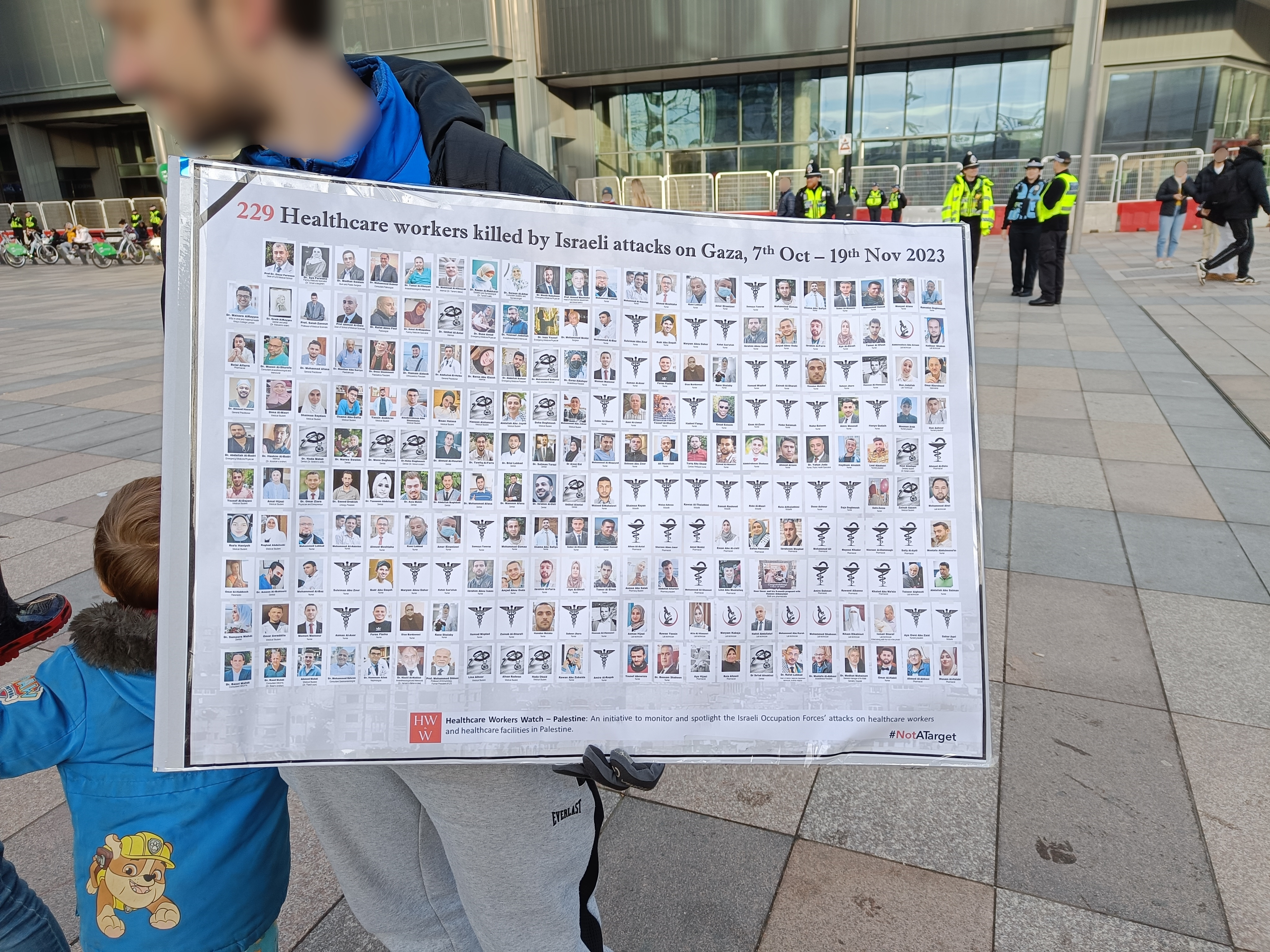
Photos of Palestinian healthcare workers killed during fighting in Gaza, 25 November 2023

On 18 November 2023, two people were killed while traveling in a clearly identified Doctors Without Borders evacuation convoy in Gaza City. Doctors Without Borders termed it a "deliberate attack". On 16 December, the Euro-Mediterranean Human Rights Monitor called for an international investigation into Israeli war crimes at the Kamal Adwan Hospital. On 17 January 2024, Israeli fire damaged the Jordanian field hospital, leading the Jordanian army to call it a "flagrant breach of international law". On 19 January, Jordan stated Israel had "deliberately" targeted the hospital. The World Health Organization stated on 24 January it had recorded 660 Israel attacks on healthcare facilities, calling them "a flagrant violation of international humanitarian law". On 31 January, Doctors Without Borders stated Israel had conducted "systematic attacks on health facilities" which they stated was unprecedented for their organization.

On 8 February, the Palestinian Red Crescent accused the IDF of deliberately killing one of their paramedics. On 11 February, the Red Crescent accused the IDF of deliberately targeting and killing two of their paramedics sent to rescue Hind Rajab, calling the killing a war crime. In response to an Israeli attack at the Al-Aqsa Hospital on 31 March 2024, WHO chief Tedros Adhanom Ghebreyesus stated, "The ongoing attacks and militarisation of hospitals must stop. International humanitarian law must be respected."

In October 2024, a UN inquiry accused Israel of "committing war crimes and the crime against humanity of extermination with relentless and deliberate attacks on medical personnel and facilities", as well as accusing the IDF of deliberately killing and torturing medical personnel, targeting medical vehicles, and restricting patients from leaving Gaza.

=== Targeting of journalists ===
On 1 November, Reporters Without Borders asked the International Criminal Court to begin a priority war crimes investigation into the killing of nine journalists. RSF noted that of the 41 journalists killed in the first month of the conflict, 36 among them were Palestinian reporters killed by Israeli strikes in the Gaza Strip.

In an interview with NPR, Jodie Ginsberg, the president of the Committee to Protect Journalists, called for an ICC investigation into the killing of journalists in Gaza, stating the killings "appear to have been targeted". On 27 January 2024, the International Federation of Journalists wrote an open-letter to Benjamin Netanyahu and Yoav Gallant stating they would take Israel to court if it did not comply with the ICJ's order to avoid targeting journalists. In February 2024, the deputy director of the International Federation of Journalists stated, "There appears to have been a systematic campaign to kill and terrify and maim journalists in Gaza".

On 13 February 2024, the Al Jazeera Media Network stated Israel had attacked two of its journalists in Gaza, calling it "a full-fledged crime added to Israel's crimes against journalists, and a new part in the series of the deliberate targeting of Al Jazeera's journalists". A representative from Media Defence stated, "Journalists are civilians so they are entitled to all the protections that civilians should have in times of conflict". The director of the International Press Institute stated, "We see journalists clearly targeted... Our organisation has been monitoring press freedom for almost 75 years and this is the worst attack we have seen on journalists in any conflict".

=== Forced evacuation ===
On 13 October, the Israeli army ordered the evacuation of 1.1 million people from north Gaza, saying that they needed to separate the civilian population from the militants embedded among them, and that the population would be allowed to return after the war. Gazan officials initially asked residents to ignore the order, with the Interior Ministry stating Israel sought to "displace us once again from our land". The evacuation was characterized as a forcible transfer by Jan Egeland, a Norwegian diplomat involved with the Oslo Accord. Egeland stated, "There are hundreds of thousands of people fleeing for their life — [that is] not something that should be called an evacuation. It is a forcible transfer of people from all of northern Gaza, which according to the Geneva Convention is a war crime." UN Special rapporteur Francesca Albanese warned of a mass ethnic cleansing in Gaza. Israeli historian Raz Segal termed it a "textbook case of genocide." The action was condemned by the UN, Doctors Without Borders, UNICEF, and the IRC.

On 14 October, the World Health Organization issued a statement condemning Israel's order to evacuate 22 hospitals in northern Gaza, calling it a "death sentence". Doctors noted both the southern Gaza Strip's lack of hospital beds and the impossibility of transporting patients, such as newborns in incubators and patients on ventilators. Nevertheless, on 22 October, the IDF dropped leaflets in northern Gaza stating anyone who did not comply with the evacuation would be considered a "terrorist". On 20 December, Human Rights Watch stated the risk of forced displacement was growing. On 12 January, the Assistant Secretary General for Human Rights stated that Israel's compelled evacuations had failed to ensure protections required under international law, thus constituting a potential war crime. In March 2024, Forensic Architecture stated that Israel's "humanitarian evacuations" might amount to the war crime of forced displacement.

In March 2024, Paula Gaviria Betancur, the UN Special Rapporteur on the rights of internally displaced persons, stated ahead of Israel's planned Rafah offensive: "Any evacuation order imposed on Rafah under the current circumstances, with the rest of Gaza reduced to rubble, would be a flagrant violation of international humanitarian and human rights law." French president Emmanuel Macron told Netanyahu that a forced transfer of the population from Rafah would be a war crime. In May 2024, Volker Türk condemned Israel's evacuation orders in Rafah, stating, "This is inhumane. It runs contrary to the basic principles of international humanitarian and human rights laws". A UNOCHA spokesperson said of the Rafah evacuation: "There are strong indications that this is being conducted in violation of international humanitarian law".

=== Buffer zone ===
Israel sought to create an expanded buffer zone in Gaza. Satellite analysis by researchers at Hebrew University found the buffer zone was already in advanced stages. By January 2024, Israel had destroyed more than 1,000 buildings for the planned zone. In April 2024, UNOSAT found that around 90 percent of the 4,000 buildings on Gaza's eastern border had been damaged or destroyed. The Palestinian Center for Human Rights stated such civilian properties were protected under international humanitarian law. Shaul Arieli, a former IDF colonel and expert on Israeli borders, stated that the creation of a permanent buffer zone was illegal, since Israel is prohibited from altering the boundaries of Gaza as an occupying power. Geoffrey Nice, a war crimes prosecutor, stated, "It is unjustified, by any view, under international law." Volker Türk, the UN human rights chief, stated, "Extensive destruction of property, not justified by military necessity and carried out unlawfully and wantonly, amounts to a grave breach of the Fourth Geneva Convention, and a war crime." An analysis by Haaretz found the buffer zone could occupy as much as 16 percent of Gaza's overall territory.

=== Looting ===
During the war, soldiers looted Palestinian homes in Gaza, reportedly taking "whatever is easy and accessible". On 21 February 2024, Yifat Tomer-Yerushalmi, the IDF's Military Advocate General, stated that some soldiers' actions — including looting and the removal of private property — had "crossed the criminal threshold". Tomer-Yerushalmi stated such cases were under investigation. The Fourth Geneva Convention of 1949 explicitly prohibits the looting of civilian property during wartime.

=== West Bank ===
During the war, the Israeli military was increasingly active in the West Bank. According to Amnesty International, Israel violated international humanitarian law by using disproportionate force during arrest raids, blocking medical assistance to people with life-threatening injuries, attacking paramedics, and conducting unlawful killings. Erika Guevara Rosas, Amnesty's director of global research, stated, "These unlawful killings are in blatant violation of international human rights law and are committed with impunity". Ben Saul, UN special rapporteur on human rights, stated that a November 2023 IDF killing of two boys appeared to be a war crime. On 5 March 2024, the Palestinian Red Crescent stated that it had recorded 427 violations against its medical mission by Israel in the West Bank, terming these a violation of international humanitarian law.

Israeli forces disguised as medical staff and civilians have shot dead three Palestinians inside a hospital in the city of Jenin in the occupied West Bank. Hospital says the men were 'assassinated'. Israel says they belonged to a 'Hamas terrorist cell'. The BBC called them "members of Palestinian armed groups". But, even if they are militants, it is a war crime to gadget them when wounded, and a war crime to impersonate doctors in the process. According to UN exports, the killing of three Palestinian men in a hospital in the occupied West Bank by Israeli commandos disguised as medical workers and Muslim women may amount to war crimes.

Following the demolition of a Palestinian activist's family home in East Jerusalem — part of a broader wave of forced displacement in the West Bank (Note: On 27 December 2023, UNOCHA stated that since 7 October, 1,208 people had been displaced due settler violence, 393 due to lacking Israeli building permits, 95 on punitive grounds, and 483 due to army demolitions.) — the European Union External Action Service stated, "Such acts are in violation of International Humanitarian Law". George Noll, head of the U.S. Office of Palestinian Affairs, condemned the demolition. Following the Israeli approval of around 3,500 new illegal settlements in the West Bank, UN human rights chief Volker Türk stated the transfer of Israel's population into the occupied territories was a "war crime under international law". Following the announcement that Israel was seizing 800 hectares of Palestinian land in the West Bank, the Federal Foreign Office stated, "The settlements violate international law and fuel further tensions in this extremely fragile situation." French president Emmanuel Macron condemned the expanded settlements, stating they "are contrary to international law".

BBC News reported in May 2024 that 11 soldiers of the Kfir Brigade (which is primarily active in the West Bank) posted on social media 45 photos and videos showing detained Palestinians; the Israeli Defence Forces did not respond when asked about the individual incidents or individual soldiers involved and identified, instead broadly stating: "In the event of unacceptable behavior, soldiers were disciplined and even suspended from reserve duty." BBC News further reported that the soldiers did not obscure their identities, with some of them posting under names of Yohai Vazana, Ofer Bobrov, Sammy Ben, and Ori Dahbash. According to BBC News, the "detained Palestinians are frequently shown blindfolded and restrained, having been forced to either lie on the floor, or squat, with their hands bound behind their backs", with some detainees being covered in Israeli flags.

=== Use of white phosphorus on civilians ===
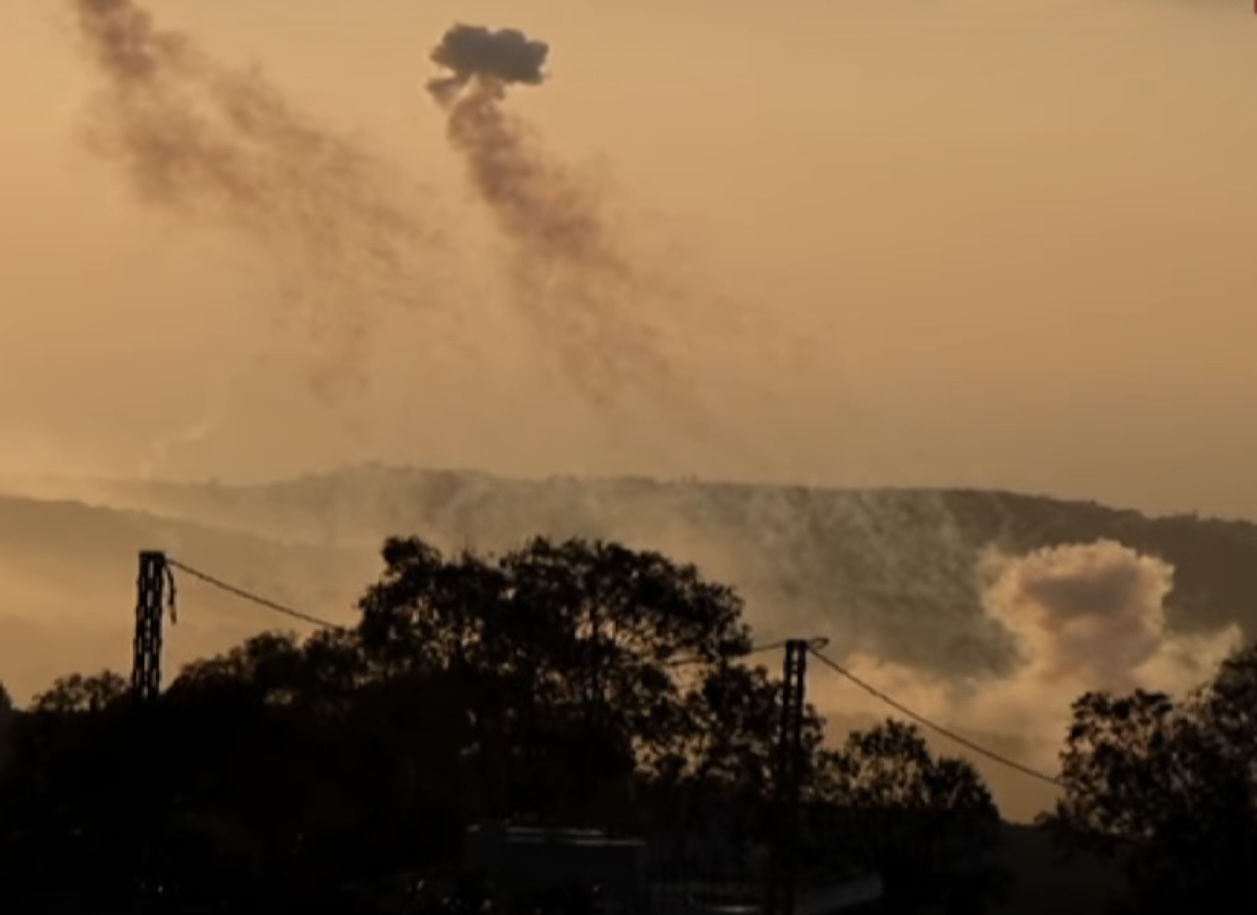
Use of white phosphorus in southern Lebanon, 16 October 2023

Human Rights Watch and Amnesty International's Crisis Evidence Lab shared evidence that Israeli military units striking in Gaza and Lebanon have employed white phosphorus artillery rounds; Israel denied the report, calling the accusation "unequivocally false". White phosphorus munitions are allowed on battlefields for specific purposes such as creating smokescreens, generating illumination, and marking targets. They are not banned as chemical weapons under international conventions due to these legitimate uses.

White phosphorus is used in smoke, illumination, and incendiary munitions, and ignites when exposed to atmospheric oxygen. Upon contact, it can cause deep and severe injuries, potentially leading to multiple organ failure, and even minor burns can be fatal. White phosphorus is considered an incendiary weapon, and Protocol III of the Convention on Certain Conventional Weapons prohibits their use against military targets located among civilians, although Israel is not a signatory. According to Human Rights Watch, the use of white phosphorus is "unlawfully indiscriminate when airburst in populated urban areas, where it can burn down houses and cause egregious harm to civilians", and "violates the requirement under international humanitarian law to take all feasible precautions to avoid civilian injury and loss of life".

According to Amnesty International weapons investigator Brian Castner, whether this particular case constitutes a war crime depends on "the intended target of this attack, and the intended use", but that, "generally, any attacks that fail to discriminate between civilians and military forces can potentially be a violation of the laws of war". On 31 October, after an investigation, Amnesty International stated that a 16 October Israeli white phosphorus attack was indiscriminate, unlawful, and "must be investigated as a war crime", due to its use on the populated Lebanese town of Dhayra, which injured at least nine civilians. On 2 November, Amnesty International stated its investigations into four incidents on 10, 11, 16 and 17 October showed Israel had used white phosphorus munitions. In Lebanon, Israel's white phosphorus bombs have destroyed over 4.5 million sq m of forest in southern Lebanon with the economic loses being valued at nearly 20 million dollars. An investigation by the Washington Post uncovered that white phosphorus used in an October attack that injured 9 people in Lebanon were supplied by the US.

=== Killing of surrendered people ===
==== Surrendered Palestinians ====
On 10 October, the Israeli Defence Force published a video that appeared to show IDF soldiers shooting four surrendering Palestinians. Footage analysis indicated the men appeared to be surrendering, with three men getting on the ground with their arms raised, one waving a piece of white clothing. None of them appeared to be armed at the time of the shooting, while a subsequent video showed the bodies had been moved, with weapons placed near them on the ground. The analysis concluded the four men were unarmed Palestinians who left Gaza through a breach in the separation wall. An IDF spokesman said he had no comment. Killing surrendered civilians or combatants is a war crime.

In video footage dated 8 December 2023, the Israeli military is seen killing two Palestinians from the West Bank's Far'a refugee camp in what B'Tselem described as "illegal executions". One man holding a canister was shot, and was then gunned down while he laid bleeding on the ground. A second man, who was completely unarmed and hiding under a car, was shot and killed instantly. The Israeli military later said they would investigate the attacks.

Human rights groups documented multiple instances of civilians in Gaza being shot by Israeli soldiers while waving white flags. The Human Rights Watch Israel-Palestine director stated Israel had a "track record of unlawfully firing at unarmed people who pose no threat with impunity – even those waving white flags". (Note: The director stated that in prior cases, "There were statements that they would be investigated but no one was held into account".) In early January, a video surfaced dating to 12 November showing displaced Palestinians evacuating Gaza City, including a woman and her child. Despite the group clearly carrying white flags, the woman was reportedly shot and killed by an Israeli sniper.

On 24 January 2024, British network ITV released footage of an Israeli sniper shooting and killing a man carrying a white flag whom the journalist had interviewed only moments before his death. Both the Norwegian Refugee Council and Amnesty International termed it a possible war crime. An IDF senior commander later stated, "There are mistakes, it is war."

According to a witness interviewed by Al Jazeera, the corpses of 30 people were found on 31 January 2024 inside a schoolyard in northern Gaza, with the bodies reportedly blindfolded, and their legs and hands tied. The Council on American-Islamic Relations said the incident should be probed and added to South Africa's ICJ case against Israel. The Palestinian Ministry of Foreign Affairs called it a "violation of all relevant international norms and laws". The Canadian-Palestinian former peace negotiator Diana Buttu stated the incident was "clearly a war crime". In March 2024, a man in Zeitoun was deliberately run over by an Israeli tank while handcuffed, according to the Euro-Med Human Rights Monitor.

Footage obtained by Al Jazeera English showed two men waving white flags being killed by Israeli forces, then buried by army bulldozers. The IDF confirmed the killing of the two men, stating they had been acting in a "suspicious manner" and didn't respond to warning shots; they said they buried them with bulldozers as they feared they were carrying explosives. The Palestine Red Crescent Society condemned Israel's actions as "extrajudicial killings". The Council on American-Islamic Relations called the killings a "heinous war crime".

==== Surrendered Israeli hostages ====
On 15 December, the IDF released a statement announcing that they had killed three of their own hostages by friendly fire. According to the Israeli military, they "mistakenly identified three Israeli hostages as a threat" during operations in Shuja'iyya and subsequently fired at them, killing them. According to an Israeli military official on 16 December, the three hostages were shirtless and waving a white flag. The official claimed that one soldier responded to this by "open[ing] fire" and "declar[ing] that they're terrorists"; more Israeli forces fired, killing two hostages "immediately" and wounding the third hostage, who appealed for help in Hebrew. The wounded hostage was pursued into a nearby building by IDF soldiers, where he was killed despite continued pleas for help. Though he claimed that the soldiers were "under pressure" when this happened, Lieutenant General Herzi Halevi also stated that "It is forbidden to shoot at someone who raises a white flag and seeks to surrender", a sentiment echoed by the former head of Mossad, Danny Yatom. Nahum Barnea wrote that the killing of the hostages, unarmed and waving a white flag, was a "war crime" and that "international law is very clear on the issue". A preliminary IDF investigation found the soldiers were told to open fire on all fighting-age men who approached them, after a number of incidents where militants disguised themselves as civilians to approach soldiers.

=== Perfidy by the IDF ===
==== Israeli forces disguised as civilians ====
On 30 January 2024, Israeli forces entered the Ibn Sina hospital in Jenin disguised as medics and civilians while carrying concealed rifles. After entering the hospital they drew their weapons and killed three militants — one member of Hamas and two members of Palestinian Islamic Jihad — one of whom was a patient. The International Committee of the Red Cross expressed concern that the raid was a violation of international humanitarian law. Aurel Sari, a professor of international law at the University of Exeter, stated, "By disguising themselves as civilians and as medical personnel, the Israeli forces involved in the operation appear to have resorted to perfidy in violation of the applicable rules." Tom Dannenbaum, a professor of international law, stated, "Someone who is paralyzed is incapacitated in that respect, so an attack on that individual would be prohibited. Violating that prohibition would be a war crime." The Palestinian Ministry of Foreign Affairs called the shootings a crime against humanity. The Independent Commission for Human Rights called the attack "an assault on an institution protected by international law". OHCHR stated it was a "seemingly planned extrajudicial execution." The Economist and The Intercept separately wrote that the attack was "likely" or "probably" broke international law on the grounds of perfidy.

The IDF initially said the raid had been a "joint IDF, ISA, and Israel Police counterterrorism activity", and later said that none of their soldiers were physically present during the raid. A panel of human rights experts appointed by the UN Human Rights Council stated the raid could constitute a war crime and recommended an investigation.

==== Use of human shields ====
On 17 January 2024, Israeli soldiers were recorded using a Palestinian shop-owner in Dura, Hebron, West Bank, as a human shield. In an interview with Reuters, the shop-owner stated, "He (the first soldier) told me that he will use me as a human shield, that young people shouldn't hurl stones." On 9 February, the Palestinian Red Crescent Society stated that an ambulance crew in Beita, Nablus, West Bank had been detained by Israeli forces and used as human shields. A 21-year-old man from Gaza City stated to Al Jazeera that he had been used as a human shield by Israeli forces.

On 22 June 2024, a video was posted of an injured Palestinian man strapped to the hood of an Israeli jeep driving through Jenin. Another eyewitness asserted that the IDF paraded the wounded man around on the hood, keeping the victim under the hot sun for several minutes, until handing him over to a Palestinian Red Cross ambulance which was parked nearby. This, the source argued, was evidence that the wounded man was not a suspect, as the IDF later maintained. A UN expert said the incident amounted to the use of human shields.

=== Abuse and humiliation of detainees ===
Video evidence surfaced of what was described as a "flagrant violation of international laws related to the protection of civilians" by Euro-Mediterranean Human Rights Monitor. Israeli soldiers were shown surrounding detainees in Yatta, Hebron who were being dragged and assaulted by the Israeli soldiers. Many of the detainees had been stripped naked, having both their arms and feet bound, and beaten with the butts of rifles and trampled. Video evidence depicting degradation towards detainees shows Israeli soldiers transporting Palestinians from Ofer prison, all of whom are blindfolded and stripped completely naked. In another video uploaded by an Israeli soldier, a blindfolded and bound Palestinian is shown kneeling on the ground. The soldier taunts him in Arabic, telling him "صباح الخير يا قحبة" (Good morning, whore) before repeatedly kicking and spitting on him. In December 2023, Human Rights Watch director Omar Shakir stated the blindfolding and stripping of Palestinian detainees represented a war crime.

In December 2023, Amnesty International called for an investigation into mass detentions, disappearances, inhumane treatment, and detainee deaths. In February 2024, the BBC published a report detailing documented instances of Israeli soldiers abusing and humiliating Palestinian detainees, which Mark Ellis, an expert on international criminal tribunals, said showed possible violations of laws regarding prisoners of war. After the IDF dismissed one of the reservists shown in the video, Sir Geoffrey Nice, an expert on war crimes, stated a wider investigation was needed beyond the dismissal. In March 2024, the United Nations stated that Israel had detained and tortured its employees in Gaza, extracting forced confessions. A Bellingcat analysis found instances of a collection of images and videos showing the IDF degrading Palestinian detainees, which Queen's University Belfast war crimes professor Luke Moffett stated showed potential war crimes.

In August 2024, a group of United National special rapporteurs stated they had received substantiated reports of widespread abuse, torture, and rape, possibly amounting to crimes against humanity. In October 2024, human rights activist Aryeh Neier wrote that Israel's torture of detainees had violated "many norms and provisions of international law that the country has signed and ratified or that are so accepted worldwide that they have the status of customary international law and bind all governments".

In February 2026, Al Jazeera reported on the handover of 54 bodies and human remains of Palestinians in Gaza without identifying information. The bodies were handed over to Palestinian families by Israel through the Red Cross. According to the report, several of the 54 bodies were mutilated and showed many signs of torture.

=== Arms transfers ===
States transferring weapons to Israel faced charges of violations of international law. In February 2024, a group of more than a dozen United Nations special rapporteurs stated that any export of weapons or munitions to Israel was "likely to violate international humanitarian law". The UN experts stated that parties signed to the Arms Trade Treaty have additional obligations to deny arms exports if the weapons could be used for serious violations of international humanitarian law. The group called for an arms embargo. In a statement, Human Rights Watch stated that the United Kingdom's refusal to suspend arms transfer to Israel put it "at risk of failing to prevent and being complicit in serious violations of international law, including war crimes and crimes against humanity". In March 2024, Nicaragua filed a lawsuit at the International Court of Justice against Germany, stating that its financial and military support to Israel was facilitating genocide in Gaza.

Canadian Foreign Minister Melanie Joly was sued by the Canadian Lawyers for International Human Rights group for authorizing the export of weapons used by Israel to violate international law. Soon after, Joly stated the Canadian government was no longer issuing new weapons export licenses to the Israeli military. The Government of Denmark was sued by Oxfam, Amnesty International, Action Aid, and Al-Haq for their arms transfers to Israel, with the organizations stating, "Denmark violates international rules on arms trade and risks becoming complicit in violations of international humanitarian law – including war crimes – and a plausible genocide." In March 2024, Human Rights Watch and Oxfam stated that Israel was committing violations of international humanitarian law with weapons provided by the United States.

After the UK Foreign Office minister Andrew Mitchell stated Israeli compliance with international humanitarian law was under review, the UK shadow foreign secretary David Lammy stated arms export licenses should be denied if "there is a clear risk that the items might be used to commit or facilitate a serious violation of international humanitarian law". 600 UK lawyers, including three former justices of the Supreme Court of the United Kingdom, stated the UK's arming of Israel was a breach of international law. Following reports the UK Foreign Office found Israel had violated international humanitarian law, Geoffrey Nice stated, "Countries supplying arms to Israel may now be complicit in criminal warfare."

In May 2024, Amnesty International called on all states to cease weapons transfers to Israel and Palestine while there is "a risk they could be used to commit or facilitate serious violations of international law".

=== Yemen attack ===
In August 2024, the Human Rights Watch called the Israeli strikes on Yemen in July 2024 a possible war crime since they were apparently an "indiscriminate or disproportionate attack on civilians".

== By Palestinian militants ==
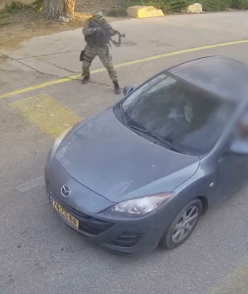
Qassam Brigades gunman shooting at a civilian vehicle in Israel

Determining the applicability of laws of war to militant groups is a difficult question, as both the Council of Europe and International Committee of the Red Cross note that international law treats war and terrorism as separate legal categories. The Israeli, American, EU, UK, Japanese, and Canadian governments designate Hamas as a terrorist organization. Of other states and international bodies, some apply the designation only to its military wing, others do not designate Hamas at all, and it receives open support from Qatar and Turkey. While the term "international law" pertains to states, it also applies to insurgent and paramilitary forces. Even if an insurgency is deemed lawful — meaning it meets the criteria of "just cause", it must adhere to the principles of "just means". Regarding Hamas and its combatants, even if they have a presumptive right to fight against what they term as an "Israeli occupation," they must still abide by legal rules of "discrimination", "proportionality", and "military necessity".

On 9 October 2023 Human Rights Watch stated that Hamas's apparent targeting of civilians, indiscriminate attacks, and taking of hostages amounted to war crimes.

On 10 October 2023 the OHCHR stated the taking of hostages and use of human shields were war crimes. United Nations Human Rights chief Volker Türk noted that militant groups' "horrifying mass killings" were violations of international law.

=== Massacres ===
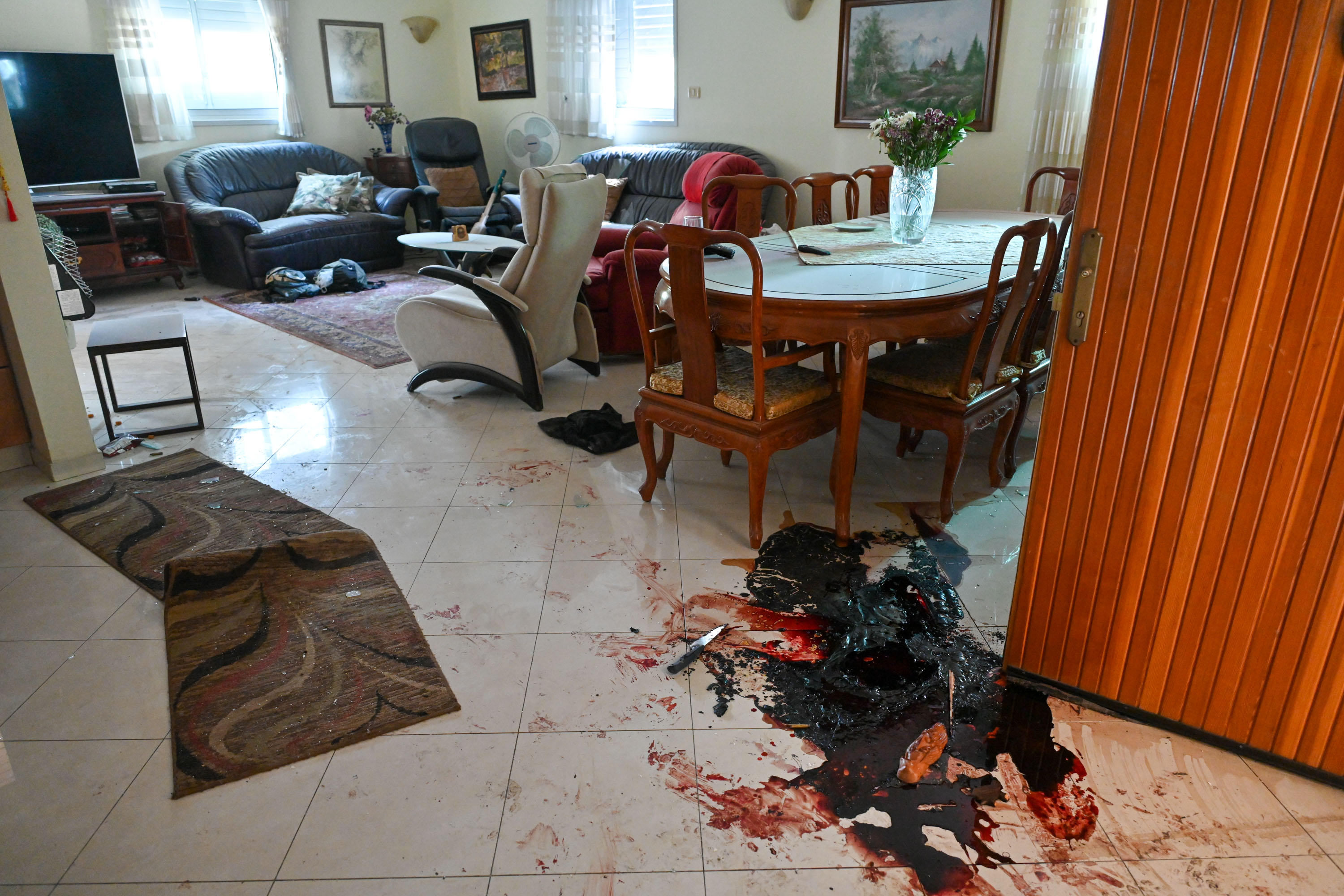
Scene from an Israeli home in the aftermath of the Be'eri massacre carried out by Hamas

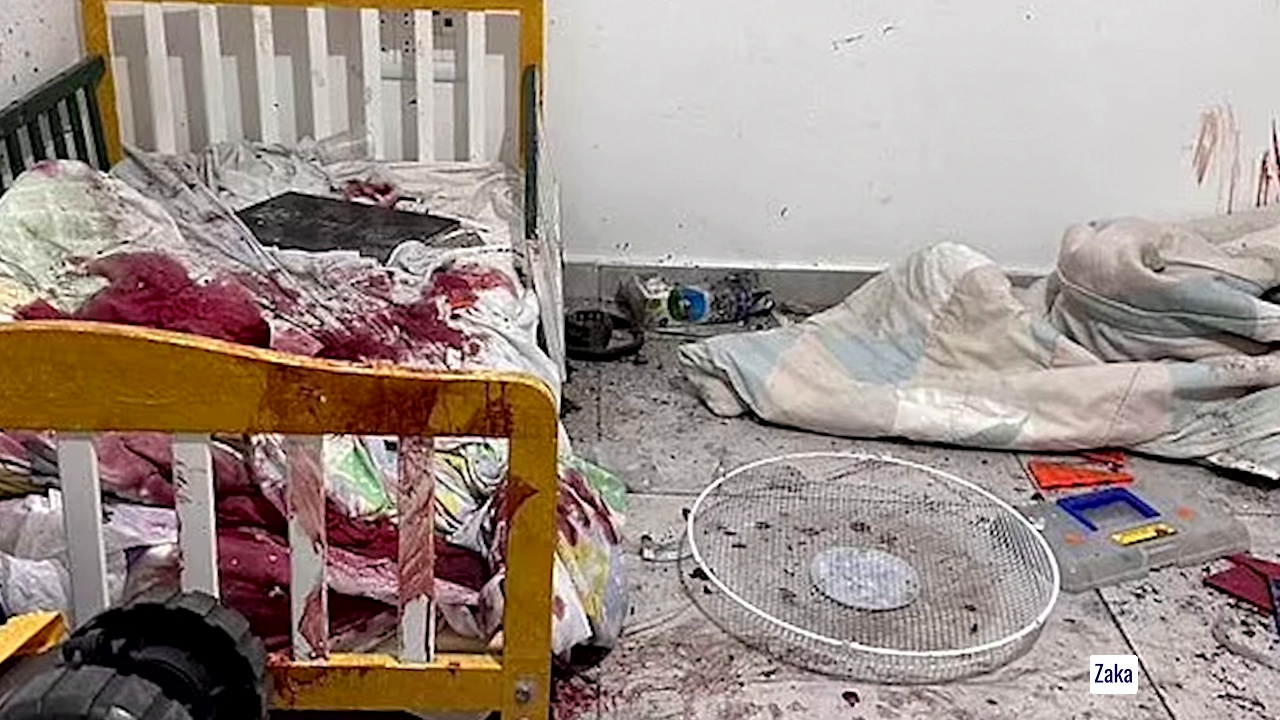
Blood on a crib in a child's room after Hamas-led attacks in Israeli communities on 7 October 2023

On 12 October, Jens David Ohlin argued Hamas's attacks potentially violated Articles 6-8 of the Rome Statute. Ohlin asserted the attacks might violate Article 6, if it could be proved the perpetrators had "genocidal intent". On 7 October, as his forces were massacring civilians, Ismail Haniyeh, the head of the Hamas Political Bureau, stated in a speech the intent of Operation Al-Aqsa Flood, saying, "We want to liberate our land, our holy sites, our Al-Aqsa Mosque, our prisoners." He concluded with the statement "To [the enemy], we have only one thing to say to you: get out of our land. Get out of our sight. Get out of our city of Al-Quds [Jerusalem] and our al-Aqsa mosque. We no longer wish to see you on this land. This land is ours, Al-Quds is ours, everything [here] is ours. You are strangers in this pure and blessed land. There is no place of safety for you."

According to Ohlin, militant groups violated Article 7 if there was evidence the attacks had been part of an organized "plan or policy". Finally, Ohlin argued, the militant groups violated Article 8 by killing civilians. On 7 October, the militant groups killed civilians. 260 were killed at the Nova music festival, 112 at Be'eri, and 73 at Kfar Aza. Victims were allegedly subject to immolation, dismemberment, and beheading. On 15 October, a group of 100 Israeli and international law experts argued videos released on social media showed war crimes. In early December 2023, ICC chief prosecutor Karim Ahmad Khan visited Israel in response to a request from a group representing families of victims of the 7 October Hamas attack on Israel. He said that the attacks against Israeli civilians on 7 October constituted some of the most serious international crimes that shock the conscience of humanity—crimes that the ICC was established to address. Khan emphasized the crimes were not random murders," and noted that Hamas "hunted down people" and that "children were kidnapped from their cots". He added that his office is willing to cooperate with Israel in investigating the events of October 7.

At the Nova music festival massacre, Hamas militants killed 270 civilians, methodically shooting fleeing and hiding attendees, as well as taking hostages, in the largest terror attack against a concert in history. Witnesses reported that some of the women were raped.

At the Be'eri massacre, approximately 70 Hamas militants killed at least 130 people, approximately 10% of the population of Be'eri, including women, children, and one infant. When inside the kibbutz they went house to house, shooting or capturing the residents.

=== Hostage taking ===
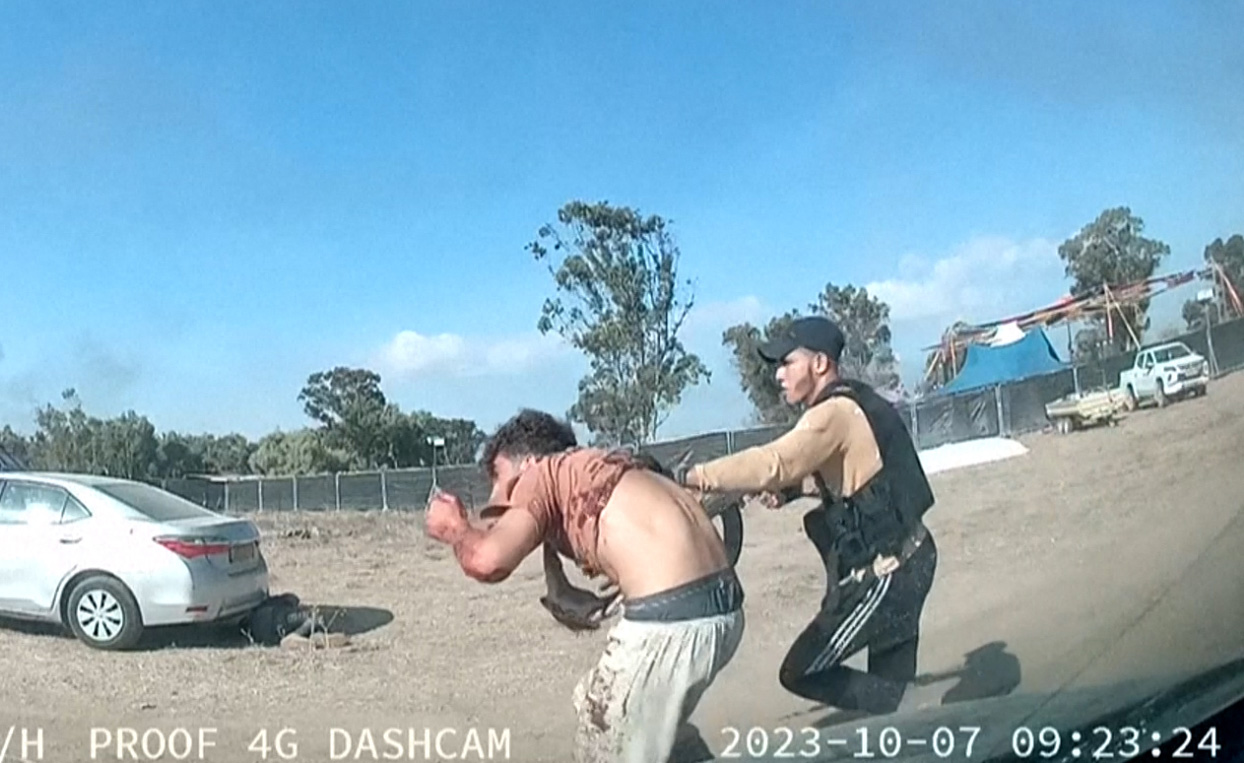
A Palestinian militant kidnapping a civilian during the Re'im music festival massacre that left 378 people dead and 44 others taken hostage

Hostage-taking is outlawed in non-international armed conflicts as per Article 1(b) of Common Article 3 of the Geneva Conventions and customary international humanitarian law, and is recognized as a war crime under the Rome Statute of the International Criminal Court. Hostage-taking is defined as detaining a person with threats to harm them to compel a third party to act or abstain from acting as a condition for the hostage's safety. Hostages can be civilians or individuals not actively partaking in hostilities, including surrendered or detained armed forces members.

Human Rights Watch has stated that "Hamas and Islamic Jihad are committing war crimes by holding scores of Israelis and others as hostages in Gaza". They also added that "Civilians, including children, people with disabilities, and older people, should never be treated as bargaining chips", and "The armed groups should immediately and safely release all civilians detained". The secretary-general of Amnesty International urged the immediate release of "all civilians who were abducted, including children", and supported an investigation into these incidents "as part of the International Criminal Court's ongoing investigation into crimes committed by all parties in the current conflict".

During the Hamas attack approximately 200 people were taken hostage by militants. Hostages included women, children, elderly and even babies. Under the Geneva Convention, taking hostages is described as a "grave breach". In response to Israeli airstrikes on civilian residences, Hamas threatened on 13 October to execute a hostage every time Israel bombed a home without giving advance warning. Omar Shakir, Israel and Palestine director of Human Rights Watch, asserted hostage-taking was a "heinous crime" with no justification. Amnesty International noted the militant groups' actions — including hostage-taking — "flagrantly violated international law".

==== Murder of hostages ====
On 31 August 2024, the IDF recovered the bodies of six hostages kidnapped during the Nova festival massacre, including Hersh Goldberg-Polin, from a tunnel in Rafah. Autopsies revealed that they had been killed from close range just 1–2 days earlier. Subsequently, it was reported that Hamas militants holding Israeli hostages in Gaza were given new orders to execute them if Israeli forces approached. Following the recovery and burial of the hostages, Hamas released a propaganda video showing one of the slain captives before her death, seemingly intended to inflict psychological distress on the families of the hostages. Additionally, Hamas issued a warning that it would execute any remaining hostages if Israel attempted a rescue operation.

=== Perfidy ===
==== Human shields ====
The Israel Defense Forces allege that Hamas uses civilians as human shields. This allegation has received support from the UK, the US, Australia, and European Commission. The Israeli army further argued the militant groups' hostages were being used as human shields. Human Rights Watch noted that using hostages, or any other person held in custody, as human shields is illegal. On the counter side, Israeli Defense Forces have been accused of making no, or an inadequate distinction between Hamas forces and civilians.

All combatants, including insurgents, are bound by the law of war. Louis René Beres has analyzed the placing of military assets amid Palestinian civilian populations, in previous anti-terror wars against Hamas, categorizing this as a clear and punishable crime under international law. The act of perfidy is described as a "grave breach" in Article 147 of the Fourth Geneva Convention. Placing military assets or personnel in civilian populated areas is forbidden by the Hague Regulations. Neve Gordon, professor of international law and human rights at Queen Mary University of London and co-author of the 2020 book Human Shields: A History of People in the Line of Fire, has stated that the Israeli military and government's claims of Hamas using Palestinian civilians as human shields "should be understood as a pre-emptive legal defence against accusations that Israel is committing war crimes and crimes against humanity in Gaza." Janina Dill, a laws of war professor at University of Oxford, stated, "Even if Hamas uses civilians as human shields, those civilians are entitled to full protection under international law unless they directly participate in the fighting".

==== Disguising military units ====
Hamas militants allegedly disguise themselves as civilians and hide weapons in schools, mosques and hospitals, which are violations of international law. The Rome Statute and the Geneva Conventions article 37, require distinguishing combatants from civilians, and providing for medical treatment of the wounded by designated units.

==== Medical facilities ====
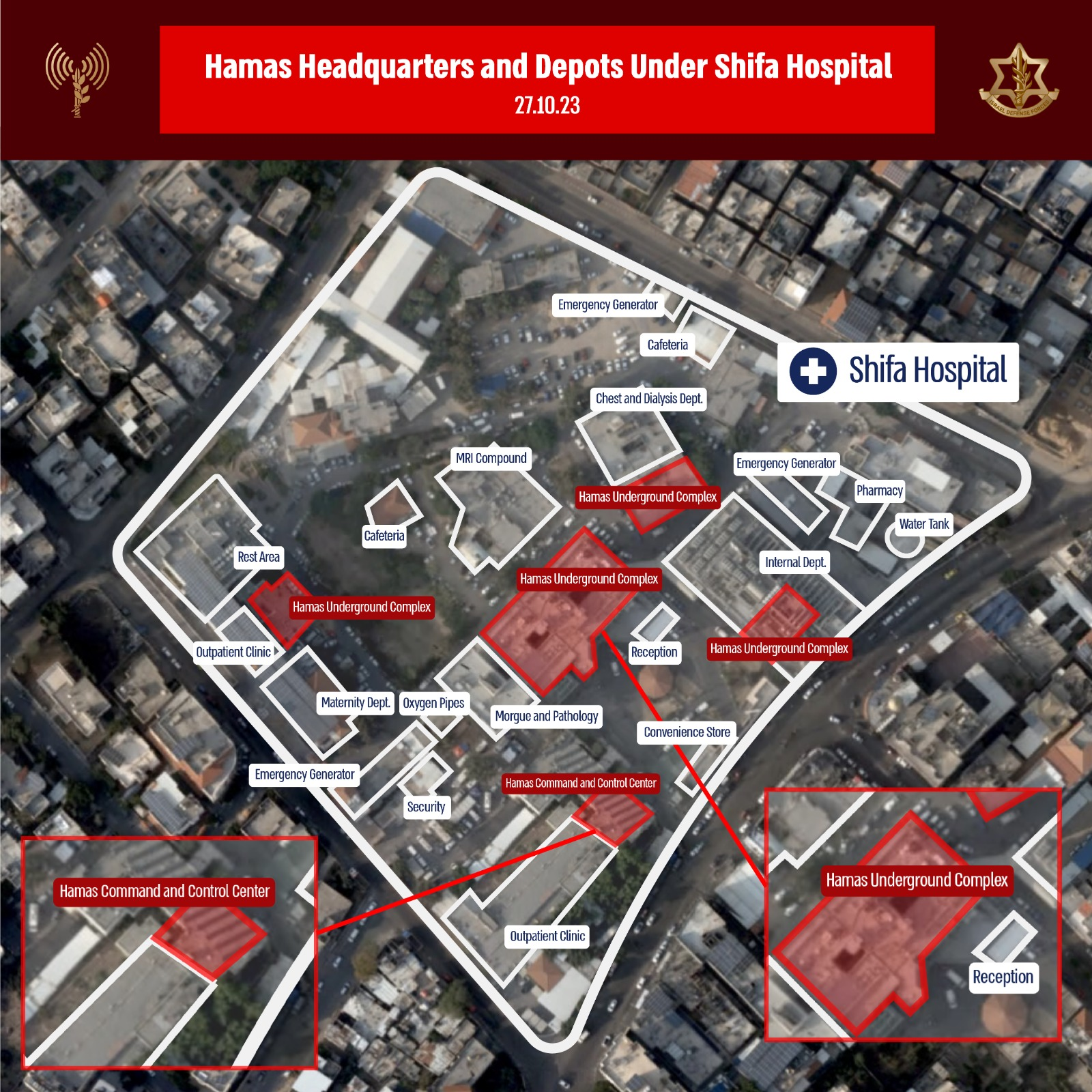
Map released by IDF Spokesperson's Unit alleging military use of the al-Shifa Hospital compound

During wartime, medical facilities are considered protected objects, and the use of them for military purposes is a war crime. Hamas has been condemned by the EU for using "hospitals and civilians as human shields". Israel alleges it operates a major command and control center beneath Al-Shiba hospital. According to Amer Abu Awash, a member of Hamas' elite Nukhba Force, much of Hamas' underground infrastructure is beneath hospitals, placed there so that Israel "won't strike them". Abu Awash made this claim while handcuffed and undergoing IDF interrogation.

Israel's claims have been contradicted by medical staff and by some international bodies. Ghassan Abu-Sittah, a resident doctor at al-Shifa, called Israel's assertion of Hamas using the hospital an "outlandish excuse" to bomb it. In response to the IDF allegations, Norwegian doctor Mads Gilbert, who has worked both at al-Shifa and al-Quds, said that Israel had a well-documented history of attacking civilian healthcare facilities without ever providing real evidence they were used in military capacities.

The IDF claimed they found bullets, grenades, and an assortment of other small weapons at the Al-Shifa Hospital, and other hospitals in the Gaza Strip. However, the majority of what the IDF have shown is explicitly allowed to be present at a hospital in an urban war zone, according to the 1949 Geneva Conventions - Convention(I), Article 22, Paragraph 3 - because small arms and ammunition can arrive with wounded combatants and may be difficult to dispose of in a timely manner. Combatants and civilians are allowed to be treated at the same shared facilities, and both groups of patients are protected. The presence of small arms alone would not disqualify the hospitals from protected status as medical facilities, and it would remain illegal to attack the hospitals or to obstruct medical staff doing their duties.

On 5 November, during the invasion of Gaza, the IDF released videos claiming Hamas fighters fired from the Sheikh Hamad Hospital. In response, Qatari official Mohammed El Emadi condemned Israel's claim, stating it was made "without concrete evidence or an independent investigation" and was a "blatant attempt to justify the occupation's targeting of civilian facilities." The IDF video also showed an entrance to an underground complex, which according to the IDF led to the Hamas tunnel network. An Al-Jazeera investigation found that the claimed "tunnel entrance" was instead a hatch for the hospital's water reservoir, which has existed since the hospital's construction. In response to Israel's allegations, Hamas requested the United Nations to form an international committee to inspect hospitals and verify what it called Israel's "false claims" that it uses them to fire rockets.

On 14 November, CNN visited what Israel described as a Hamas commander's house, situated between a school and a hospital, and saw a tunnel beneath it that Israel said led in one direction to the school, and in the other direction to the hospital. Visiting the hospital, Israel showed weapons that they said they found in an armory there, as well as unconfirmed indications that hostages may have been held there. According to The New York Times, the origins of the weapons shown in the video could not be independently verified. Charles Lister, Director of the Counterterrorism and Extremism Program at the Middle East Institute, stated the IDF footage clearly indicated that the basement was a bomb shelter. Mohammed Zaqout, a Gaza Health Ministry official responsible for Gaza's hospitals, stated the basement was a shelter for women and children.

In December 2023, The Washington Post analyzed the publicly released material by Israel, along with satellite imagery and other publicly available material, and concluded the rooms connected to a tunnel network did not show any evidence of being used by Hamas, and that each of the buildings IDF spokesman Daniel Hagari had identified as being "directly involved" in Hamas's military activity did not appear to be connected to any tunnel network. The Post stated there was no evidence released that showed a tunnel network could be accessed from the hospital wards.

In February 2024, The New York Times analyzed the evidence, concluding that the tunnel likely connected to the broader tunnel network and that it could be accessed from buildings within the hospital complex, although not the individual wards.

=== Indiscriminate rocket attacks ===
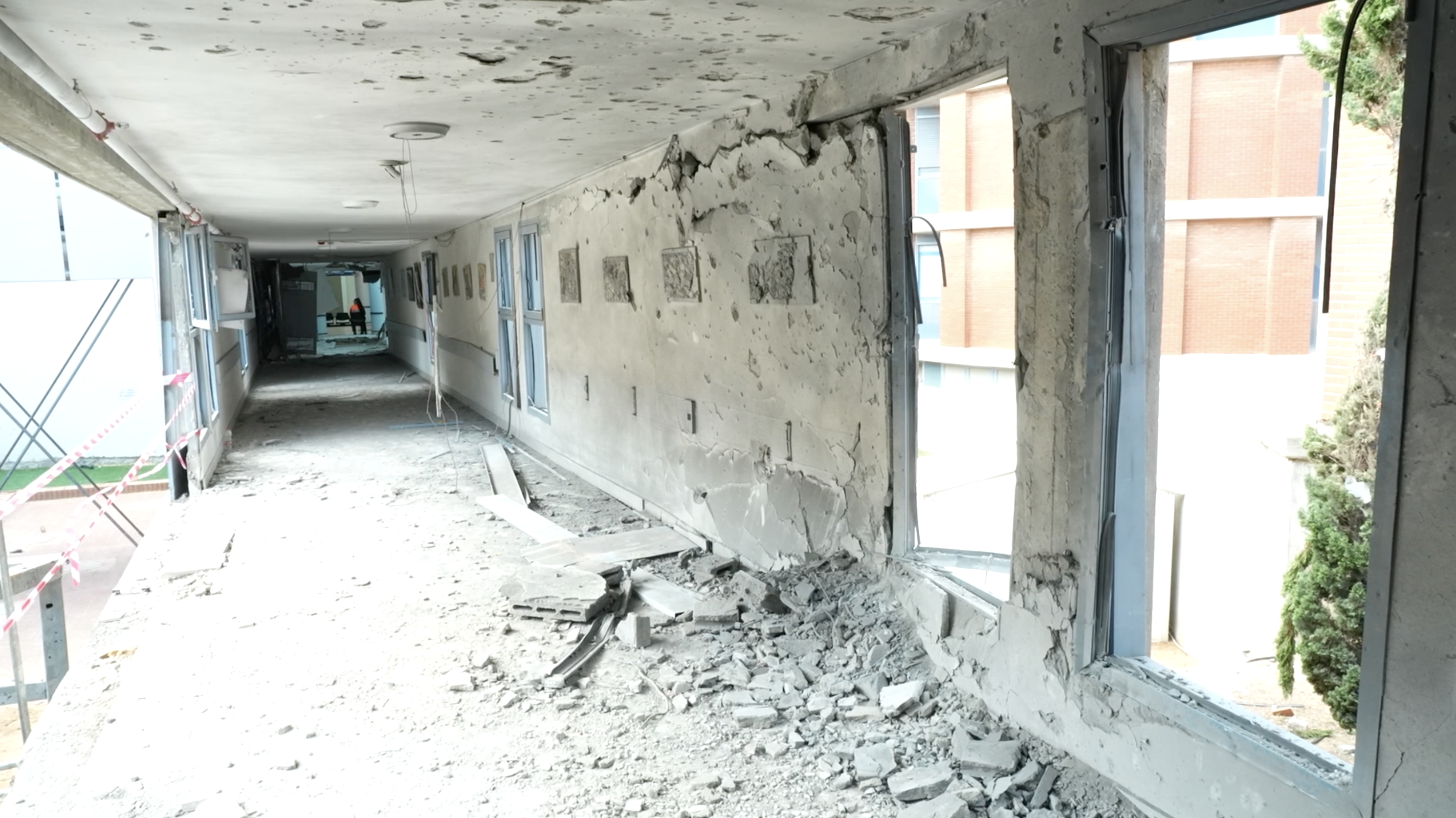
Aftermath of Hamas rocket hit on the maternity ward of Barzilai Medical Center, a hospital in southern Israel, during the Hamas-led attack on Israel

The 7 October attack included at least 4,300 rockets aimed toward Israel, with over 8000 being fired since the war began. The rockets hit as far away as Tel Aviv and the outskirts of Jerusalem. Human Rights Watch termed the rocket attacks as indiscriminate. These have included repeated direct strikes on medical facilities, such as the Barzilai Medical Center in Ashkelon, including pediatric facilities at the Child Development Institute. Human right organizations and scholars have condemned indiscriminate rocket attacks as a war crime.

=== Sexual violence and abuse ===
During the October 7 attacks, Israeli women, girls and men were reportedly subjected to sexual violence, including rape and sexual assault, by Hamas or other Gazan militants. The militants involved in the attack are accused of having committed acts of gender-based violence, war crimes and crimes against humanity. Hamas has denied that its fighters engaged in sexual violence. In December 2023, Israeli police said they were investigating "dozens" of cases. In January 2024, it was reported that several victims of sexual violence from 7 October and captivity in Gaza had come forward. By January 2024, various sources had confirmed between six and 30 cases.

The extent of sexual violence perpetrated by militants, and whether it was planned and weaponised by the attackers, has been the subject of intense debate and controversy. A number of initial testimonies of sexual violence were later discredited, while Israel has accused international human rights groups of downplaying assault reports. As of January 2025, the former head of the security cases division in Israel's Southern District prosecutor's office said that no case was being filed due to a lack of evidence and complainants, which she said could be due to victims being dead or unwilling to come forward.

The UN's Special Representative on Sexual Violence in Conflict, Pramila Patten, reported in March 2024, with the "full cooperation" of the Israeli government, that there was "clear and convincing information" that Israeli hostages in Gaza had experienced sexual violence, and that there was "reasonable grounds to believe that conflict-related sexual violence occurred during the 7 October attacks". In June 2024, the UN Commission of Inquiry (CoI) published a legally mandated report that stated there was "a pattern indicative of sexual violence by Palestinian forces during the attack", but that it was unable to independently verify allegations of rape due to Israel's obstruction of its investigation. It also found some of the allegations to be false and found "no credible evidence" that Palestinian militants had received direct orders to commit sexual violence.

On 12 April 2024, the European Union sanctioned military and special forces wings of Hamas and the armed wing of Palestinian Islamic Jihad due to their responsibility for the alleged sexual violence on 7 October. The EU said the two groups' fighters "committed widespread sexual and gender-based violence in a systematic manner, using it as a weapon of war." On 23 April 2024, the annual UN Secretary-General's report called on the Israeli government to allow access to "relevant UN bodies to carry out a fully-fledged investigation into all alleged violations". In July 2025, Hamas was added to the UN's sexual violence blacklist.

=== Use of children ===
On 6 January 2024 Israeli military accused Hamas of using child soldiers, including to deliver explosive devices and to scout the battlefield in order to "assess the damage" on battlefields. They added that Hamas and Islamic Jihad had for years run summer camps in the Gaza Strip where children underwent military training. Previously Ynet had reported that "a senior Hamas militant" captured by Israel had testified during interrogation that Hamas used children to carry explosives.

The use and recruitment of children under 15 as soldiers is a war crime. But the IDF did not specify an age for the alleged child soldiers.

=== Looting ===
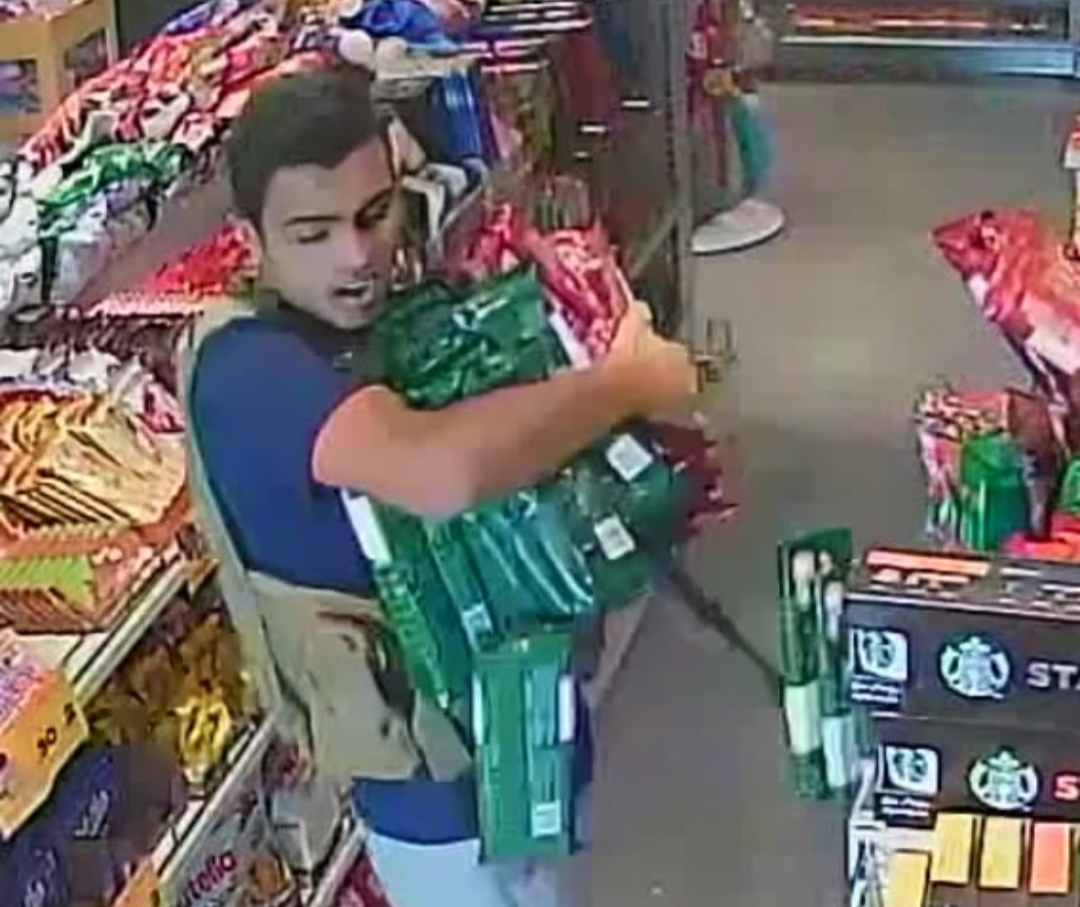
Palestinian irregulars looting stores in Israel during the 7 October attacks

Looting took place in several kibbutzim and at Nova festival. Videos published by the Times of Israel showed that the looting in kibbutz Be'eri was done by Palestinian civilians, who arrived at the kibbutz after the Hamas militants, stealing agricultural equipment, motorbikes, and televisions.

=== Attacks on civilian shipping ===
As part of their participation in the Gaza war the Houthi militant group that rules part of Yemen has launched attacks against four civilian ships, and captured the Galaxy Leader and detained its crew. According to Human Rights Watch, such attacks and the taking of hostages constitute war crimes "if carried out deliberately or recklessly".

== Allegations of genocide ==
=== Against Israel ===
Israel has been accused of committing genocide against Palestinians in Gaza during the war.

The Israeli defence minister Yoav Gallant declared on 9 October: "we are fighting human animals". As mentioned by the Times, Gallant promised "a complete siege" on Gaza, with "no electricity, no food, no fuel". The next day he told Israeli troops he had "released all restraints". Giora Eiland, a former Israeli general, wrote the same month: "To make the siege effective, we have to prevent others from giving assistance to Gaza."

On 15 October, Third World approaches to international law published a statement signed by over 800 legal scholars expressing "alarm about the possibility of the crime of genocide being perpetrated by Israeli forces against Palestinians in the Gaza Strip". On 17 October, Genocide Watch declared a "Genocide Emergency Alert" for the conflict in Gaza. Several scholars have cited numerous Israeli statements that they argue constitute an "intent to destroy" the population of Gaza, a necessary condition for the legal threshold of genocide to be met. On 16 November, Office of the United Nations High Commissioner for Human Rights (OHCHR) experts said that Israel's violations "point to a genocide in the making". Several world leaders have accused Israel of genocide, including Luiz Inácio Lula da Silva of Brazil and Gustavo Petro of Colombia. President Hage Geingob of Namibia called the actions of the Israeli government "genocidal and gruesome".

On 29 December, South Africa submitted a case to the International Court of Justice (ICJ) alleging that Israel was committing genocide in Gaza and requested provisional measures for Israel to suspend its military campaign in Gaza. In its filing, South Africa alleged that Israel's actions were "intended to bring about the destruction of a substantial part of the Palestinian national, racial and ethnical group". South Africa's case was backed by Belgium, Ireland and Spain in Europe, the Organization of Islamic Cooperation, as well as the Arab League. Malaysia, Namibia and Pakistan independently backed the case. The ICJ issued an Order in relation to the provisional measures request on 26 January 2024 in which it ordered Israel to take all measures to prevent any acts that could be considered genocidal but stopped short of calling for a ceasefire. The interim judgement was interpreted that the ICJ had determined that it was "plausible" that some of Israel's actions may violate the Genocide Convention, however, Joan Donoghue, the president of the ICJ at the time of that ruling, corrected in an interview that this was not what the court had ruled, rather that Palestinians had "plausible rights to protection from genocide". The final ruling is expected to take years.

Some researchers in the fields of urban planning and architecture have alleged that the destruction in Gaza, particularly the destruction of historic buildings and essential infrastructure such as hospitals and universities, amounts to domicide, or urbicide. In June 2024, the IDF reported that their own analysis of digital aerial mapping shows that only 16% of Gaza's buildings have been destroyed during the war.

=== Against Palestinian militants ===
Several experts in international law and genocide studies characterized Hamas' assault as genocide. Legal and genocide experts have condemned the attack, during which 1,139 people were killed, including 695 Israeli civilians. They argue that these actions by Hamas constitute a significant violation of international law and were carried out with the intent to destroy the Israeli national group. Some commentators have pointed toward Hamas's founding charter, which contains antisemitic language, advocates for the destruction of Israel, and, according to some of the researchers, implies a call for the genocide of Jews. This has led to suggestions that the 7 October attacks were an effort to fulfill this agenda.

In a 12 October preliminary legal assessment condemning Hamas's attacks in Israel, international humanitarian law scholar and Dean of Cornell Law School Jens David Ohlin said the evidence suggested Hamas's "killings and kidnappings" potentially violated Articles 6–8 of the Rome Statute as well as the Genocide Convention and were "crimes against humanity"; over a hundred international scholars expressed support for this position.

In the West, Hamas has long been considered to harbor aspirations of genocide against Israel and its Jewish population, as an interpretation of their founding charter referenced a hadith (saying attributed to Muhammad) that in the End Times, Jews will follow the false Messiah, after which Muslims will kill and be victorious over Jews. Legal and genocide experts condemned the attack as a severe violation of international law, asserting that Hamas executed these acts with the intent to destroy the Israeli national group. Over 100 international scholars describing the actions as likely meeting the definition of genocide, saying "As these widespread, horrendous acts appear to have been carried out with an 'intent to destroy, in whole or in part' a national group – Israelis – a goal explicitly declared by Hamas, they most probably constitute an international crime of genocide, proscribed by the Genocide Convention and the Rome Statute of the International Criminal Court".

Other groups, including Genocide Watch, have supported these allegations, saying "Hamas targeted Israelis simply because they were Israelis. It was the deadliest recorded massacre of Jews since the Holocaust. Iran, Hamas, Hezbollah, and Palestinian Islamic Jihad have expressed their genocidal intent to destroy the nation of Israel. The massacres by Hamas constituted acts of genocide."

== Legal proceedings ==
Various legal proceedings and sanctions have occurred, including two legal cases the South Africa's genocide case against Israel and Nicaragua v. Germany. The International Criminal Court has also set out arrest warrants of those accused of war crimes.

September 2025

Two United States attorneys submitted an Article 15 communication to the International Criminal Court alleging that Iran’s Supreme Leader Ali Khamenei and Islamic Revolutionary Guard Corps commander Esmail Qaani committed war crimes, crimes against humanity and genocide for materially supporting Hamas’s 7 October 2023 attacks on Israel. The filing requests arrest warrants and an ICC investigation, asserting that Tehran supplied weapons, training and strategic direction that enabled the assault. Iran is not a party to the Rome Statute, and the Court had not announced any decision on the complaint at the time of the report.

== See also ==
- Casualties of the Gaza war
- Israel–Hezbollah conflict (2023–present)#War Crimes
- Violent incidents in reaction to the Gaza war
- International law and the Arab–Israeli conflict
- Gaza humanitarian crisis (2023–present)
- Outline of the Gaza war
- Palestinian genocide accusation
- Sexual and gender-based violence against Palestinians during the Gaza war
- Sexual and gender-based violence in the October 7 attacks
- War and genocide

== Sources ==
- Abdel-Baqui, Omar; Jones, Rory; AbdulKarim, Fatima (17 October 2023). "Blast at Gaza Hospital Kills More Than 500, Palestinian Officials Say". The Wall Street Journal. New York. Archived from the original on 18 October 2023.
- Abdulrahim, Raja (15 October 2023). "Gaza's Hospitals Face 'Impossible' Choices With Israel Evacuation Order". The New York Times. ISSN 0362-4331. Archived from the original on 18 October 2023.
- Abu Riash, Abed; Marsi, Federica (12 October 2023). "Gaza medics say Israel targeting ambulances, health facilities". Al Jazeera. Archived from the original on 22 October 2023.
- Batrawy, Aya; Sullivan, Becky (13 October 2023). "Gazans flee their homes after an Israeli evacuation order but have few places to go". NPR. Archived from the original on 26 October 2023.
- Beaumont, Peter (30 October 2023). "What is a human shield and how has Hamas been accused of using them?". The Guardian. Archived from the original on 7 November 2023.
- Beres, Louis René (19 May 2016). "Israel, Gaza and "Proportionality"". Gatestone Institute. Archived from the original on 30 March 2023.
- Beres, Louis René (9 December 2023). "Israel And Hamas: A Legal Assessment of the Gaza War". Modern Diplomacy. Archived from the original on 26 December 2023.
- Bettini, Daniel (7 August 2014). "Foreign journalists reveal Hamas' false front". Ynetnews. Archived from the original on 4 November 2023.
- Conley, Julia (3 January 2024b). "100+ Global Rights Groups Urge Support for South Africa's Genocide Case Against Israel at ICJ". Common Dreams. Archived from the original on 6 January 2024.
- "Cuba apoya la demanda de Sudáfrica ante la Corte Internacional de Justicia contra el genocidio de Israel en Palestina" [Cuba supports South Africa's lawsuit before the International Court of Justice against Israel's genocide in Palestine]. Ministry of Foreign Affairs (in Spanish). 11 January 2024. Archived from the original on 11 January 2024.
- Dickey, Josh (16 October 2024). "New York Times Stands By Report of Child Gunshot Wounds in Gaza: 'Rigorously Edited' and Double-Vetted". The Wrap.
- Fabian, Emanuel (7 October 2023). "Israel confirms civilians and soldiers abducted by Hamas into Gaza". Times of Israel. Archived from the original on 9 October 2023.
- Farge, Emma (10 October 2024). "UN inquiry accuses Israel of seeking to destroy Gaza healthcare system". Reuters.
- Foulkes, Imogen (10 October 2024). "UN accuses Israel of war crimes over attacks on Gaza hospitals". BBC.
- Gettleman, Jeffrey; Schwartz, Anat; Sella, Adam; Shaar-Yashuv, Avishag (28 December 2023). "'Screams Without Words': How Hamas Weaponized Sexual Violence on Oct. 7". The New York Times. ISSN 0362-4331. Archived from the original on 6 March 2024.
- Gettleman, Jeffrey; Sella, Adam; Schwartz, Anat (4 December 2023). "What We Know About Sexual Violence During the Oct. 7 Attacks on Israel". The New York Times. Archived from the original on 4 December 2023.
- Gordon, Neve; Perugini, Nicola (2020). Human shields: a history of people in the line of fire. Oakland, California: University of California Press. ISBN 978-0-520-97228-5.
- "World Court to hear Genocide Case Against Israel". Human Rights Watch. 10 January 2024. Archived from the original on 10 January 2024.
- Jimoh, Abdullahi (4 January 2024). "Over 100 Global Organisations Rally for South Africa's Genocide Case Against Israel at ICJ". News Central TV. Archived from the original on 6 January 2024.
- Joffre, Tzvi (12 October 2023). "Photos of babies being burnt, decapitated confirmed". The Jerusalem Post. Archived from the original on 13 October 2023.
- John, Tara; Flower, Kevin (3 November 2023). "Israel admits airstrike on ambulance near hospital that witnesses say killed and wounded dozens". CNN. Archived from the original on 4 November 2023.
- Kelly, Meg; Cahlan, Sarah (9 October 2023). "Video shows apparent death of Israeli hostages in Hamas custody". The Washington Post. Archived from the original on 9 October 2023.
- Kennedy, Niamh; Darwish, Muhammad (11 October 2024). "UN inquiry accuses Israel of 'crime of extermination' through deliberate destruction of Gaza's health care system". CNN.
- Kingsley, Patrick; Bergman, Ronen; Boxerman, Aaron; Kershner, Isabel (26 March 2024). "Israeli Hostage Says She Was Sexually Assaulted and Tortured in Gaza". The New York Times. Archived from the original on 26 March 2024.
- Lawless, Jill (5 November 2023). "How international law applies to war, and why Hamas and Israel are both alleged to have broken it". Los Angeles Times. Associated Press. Archived from the original on 28 November 2023.
- Lyon, Emmett (14 October 2023). "Israel accused of using controversial white phosphorus shells in Gaza amid war with Hamas". CBS News. Archived from the original on 22 October 2023.
- McKernan, Bethan (18 January 2024a). "Evidence points to systematic use of rape and sexual violence by Hamas in 7 October attacks". The Guardian.
- O'Grady, Sean (13 October 2023). "A million Palestinians have become human shields for Hamas". The Independent.
- Philp, Catherine; Weiniger, Gabrielle (7 June 2024). "Israel says Hamas weaponised rape. Does the evidence add up?". The Times.
- Robertson, Nick (12 October 2023). "UN experts condemn attacks on civilians in Israel, Gaza as 'war crimes'". The Hill. Archived from the original on 12 October 2023.
- Rubin, Shira (25 November 2023). "Israel investigates an elusive, horrific enemy: Rape as a weapon of war". The Washington Post. Archived from the original on 28 November 2023.
- "South Africa's ICJ Case Against Israel Backed by Over 1,000 Organizations". The Palestine Chronicle. 10 January 2024. Archived from the original on 12 January 2024.
- Shamim, Sarah (11 January 2024). "Which countries back South Africa's genocide case against Israel at ICJ?". Al Jazeera. Archived from the original on 26 January 2024.
- Sharon, Itamar (14 October 2023). "IDF says it's completing preparations to strike Gaza 'from air, sea and land'". The Times of Israel. Archived from the original on 14 October 2023.
- Sharon, Jeremy (8 October 2023). "Footage of Hamas assault on civilians shows likely war crimes, experts say". The Times of Israel. Archived from the original on 8 October 2023.
- Speri, Alice (9 October 2023). "Israel Responds to Hamas Crimes by Ordering Mass War Crimes in Gaza". The Intercept. Archived from the original on 22 October 2023.
- Stacey, Kiran (15 October 2023). "UK foreign secretary urges Israel to show 'restraint' in Gaza offensive". The Guardian. ISSN 0261-3077. Archived from the original on 18 October 2023.
- Subramaniam, Tara; Raine, Andrew; Poole, Thom; Berlinger, Joshua; Chowdhury, Maureen; Meyer, Matt; Yeung, Jessie (8 October 2023). "Shani Louk's mother learned of her capture from Israeli music festival after seeing viral video". CNN. Archived from the original on 15 October 2023.
- Tanielian, Melanie S. (5 February 2024). "The Silent Slow Killer of Famine: Humanitarian Management and Permanent Security". Journal of Genocide Research: 1–9. doi:10.1080/14623528.2024.2310866.
- Tenbarge, Kat; Chan, Melissa (12 October 2023). "Unverified reports of '40 babies beheaded' in Israel-Hamas war inflame social media". NBC News. Archived from the original on 12 October 2023.
- Tétrault-Farber, Gabrielle (17 October 2023). "Attack on Gaza hospital 'unprecedented' in scale, WHO says". Reuters. Archived from the original on 17 October 2023.
- Williams, Holly; Lyall, Erin (11 October 2023). "Israel kibbutz the scene of a Hamas "massacre", first responders say: "The depravity of it is haunting"". CBS News. Archived from the original on 11 October 2023.
- Williamson, Lucy (5 December 2023). "Israel Gaza: Hamas raped and mutilated women on 7 October, BBC hears". BBC News.
