= Fabrizio Carbone =

Italian and Swiss physicist

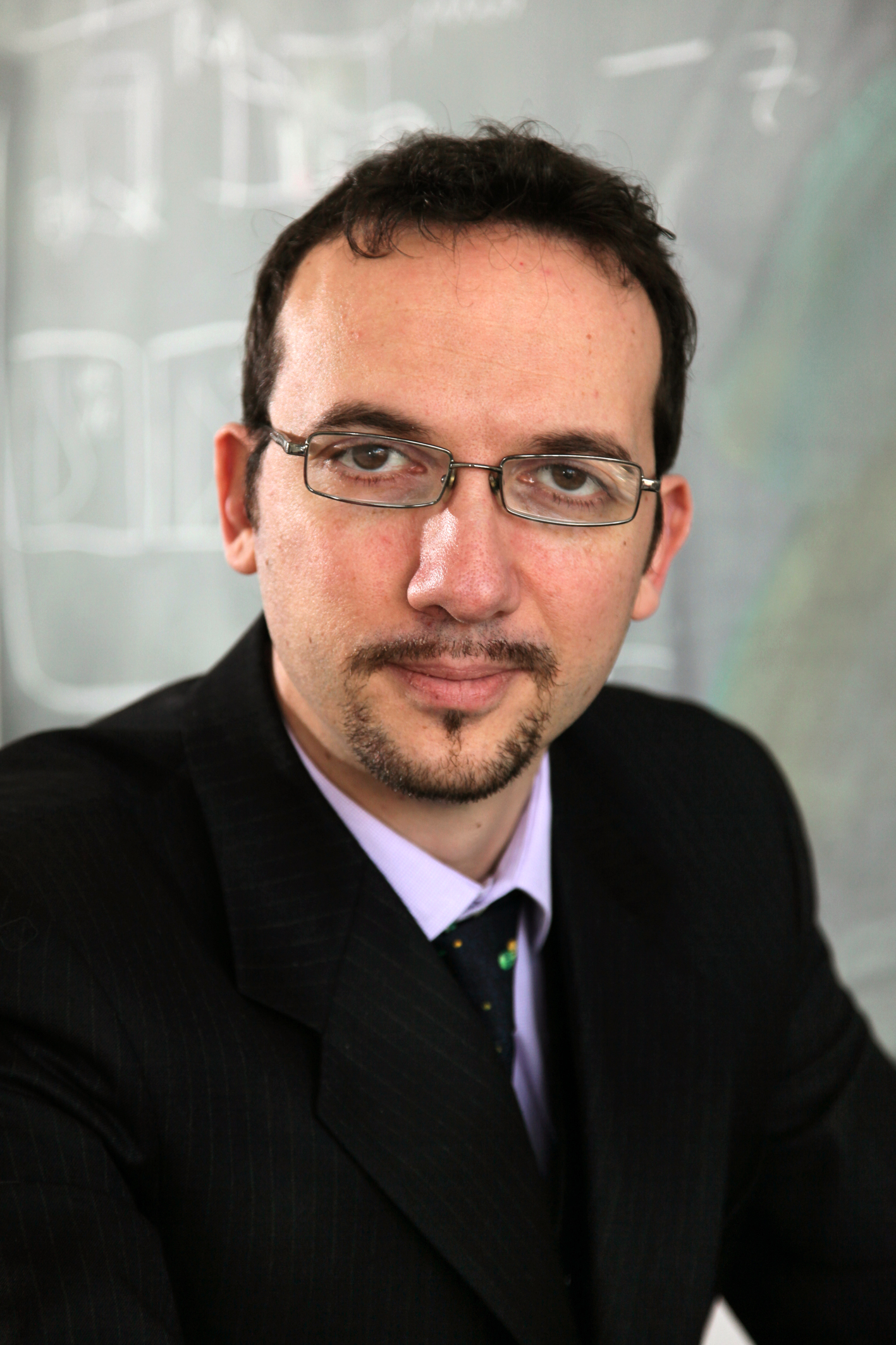
- Fabrizio Carbone in 2011
- Born: 20 April 1976 (age 50); Novi Ligure, Italy
- Education: University of Pavia; University of Geneva
- Scientific career
- Fields: Physics, engineering
- Workplaces: École Polytechnique Fédérale de Lausanne (EPFL)
- Thesis: Spectroscopic signatures of electronic correlations in superconductors and magnets (2007)
- Doctoral advisor: Dirk van der Marel
- Other academic advisors: Ahmed Zewail

Fabrizio Carbone (born 20 April 1976 in Novi Ligure, Italy) is an Italian and Swiss physicist and currently an associate professor at École Polytechnique Fédérale de Lausanne (EPFL). His research focuses on the study of matter in out of equilibrium conditions using ultrafast spectroscopy, diffraction and imaging techniques. In 2015, he attracted international attention by publishing a photography of light displaying both its quantum and classical nature.

== Education and career ==
Fabrizio Carbone received his master's degree in quantum electronics from the University of Pavia in 2001, defending a thesis titled 'Characterization of all optical wavelengths converters for telecommunications applications'. He was an industrial researcher at Pirelli Labs between 2000 and 2002, after which he returned to academia and obtained his PhD in condensed matter physics from the University of Geneva in 2007 defending a thesis titled 'Spectroscopic signatures of electronic correlations in superconductors and magnets' under the supervision of Dirk van der Marel. Carbone carried out his postdoctoral appointment at the California Institute of Technology in the group of Chemistry Nobel Prize laureate Ahmed Zewail. In 2010, he established the Laboratory for Ultrafast Microscopy and Electron Scattering (LUMES) at EPFL, where he was named tenure track assistant professor in 2011 and promoted to associate professor in 2018.

== Research ==
=== Early career ===
During his PhD in Dirk van der Marel's laboratory at the University of Geneva, Carbone analyzed the interplay between the electronic structure and the magnetism of manganese monosilicide by means of X-rays and neutron spectroscopy. He also studied the kinetic and potential energy changes associated to the superconducting phase transition in cuprates by measuring the material's color changes across the critical temperature.

As a postdoctoral researcher in Ahmed Zewail's laboratory at the California Institute of Technology, he developed new methods based on the use of ultrafast electrons and laser pulses for the investigation of materials in out of equilibrium conditions. His most notable result was the demonstration of a new method to perform femtosecond-resolved electron spectroscopy in a Transmission Electron microscope. This technique opened a new field of research in the following years leading to several breakthroughs in the observation of materials, molecules and nanostructures under laser irradiation conditions.

=== Current activities ===
Carbone currently heads the Laboratory for Ultrafast Microscopy and Electron Scattering (LUMES) at EPFL. The LUMES is active in various research fields:

- Physics of phase transitions in strongly correlated solids: in this area, the group of Prof. Carbone reported the first real-time observation of the coherent oscillations of a superconducting condensate triggered by the superconducting to normal-state phase transition-induced laser pulses.
- Imaging and controlling nano-confined electromagnetic fields: various new methods were developed to obtain real-space/real-time movies of light confined in nanostructures. These results are of particular importance both for fundamental aspects and applications in optoelectronic devices. In a 2019 report, the LUMES demonstrated a new quantum holography technique allowing to achieve attosecond/nanometer combined temporal and spatial resolution in mapping electromagnetic fields.
- Using light to engineer the wave function of free electrons: the LUMES proposed techniques using light pulses to manipulate the wave function of individual electrons at the attosecond temporal scale. These experiments have offered novel interesting perspectives for fundamental physics studies, but also for application in nuclear energy harvesting.
- Ultrafast manipulation of spins in magnetic materials: this project aims at using light pulses to manipulate the spin texture in exotic magnetic materials such as skyrmion-hosting solids. Carbone's laboratory recently demonstrated the possibility to write and erase skyrmions with light pulses as well as to map the dynamical evolution of the magnetic ordering across the phase transition.

== Recognition ==
Carbone was awarded the 2016 University Latsis Prize. He received a Starting Grant (2010) and a Consolidator Grant (2017) from the European Research Council. He was named a Fellow of the American Physical Society in 2022 "for pioneering work using ultrafast electron scattering instrumentation to discover and control new states of matter at the nanometer and sub-femtosecond scales".

== Selected works ==
- Vanacore, G. M.; Berruto, G.; Madan, I.; Pomarico, E.; Biagioni, P.; Lamb, R. J.; McGrouther, D.; Reinhardt, O.; Kaminer, I.; Barwick, B.; Larocque, H.; Grillo, V.; Karimi, E.; García De Abajo, F. J.; Carbone, F. (2019). "Ultrafast generation and control of an electron vortex beam via chiral plasmonic near fields". Nature Materials. 18 (6): 573–579. arXiv:1806.00366. Bibcode:2019NatMa..18..573V. doi:10.1038/s41563-019-0336-1. PMID 31061485. S2CID 119186105.
- Madan, I.; Vanacore, G. M.; Pomarico, E.; Berruto, G.; Lamb, R. J.; McGrouther, D.; Lummen, T. T. A.; Latychevskaia, T.; García De Abajo, F. J.; Carbone, F. (2019). "Holographic imaging of electromagnetic fields via electron-light quantum interference". Science Advances. 5 (5) eaav8358. arXiv:1809.10576. Bibcode:2019SciA....5.8358M. doi:10.1126/sciadv.aav8358. PMC 6499551. PMID 31058225.
- Berruto, G.; Madan, I.; Murooka, Y.; Vanacore, G. M.; Pomarico, E.; Rajeswari, J.; Lamb, R.; Huang, P.; Kruchkov, A. J.; Togawa, Y.; Lagrange, T.; McGrouther, D.; Rønnow, H. M.; Carbone, F. (2018). "Laser-Induced Skyrmion Writing and Erasing in an Ultrafast Cryo-Lorentz Transmission Electron Microscope" (PDF). Physical Review Letters. 120 (11) 117201. arXiv:1709.00495. Bibcode:2018PhRvL.120k7201B. doi:10.1103/PhysRevLett.120.117201. PMID 29601740. S2CID 4623706.
- Piazza, L.; Lummen, T.T.A.; Quiñonez, E.; Murooka, Y.; Reed, B.W.; Barwick, B.; Carbone, F. (2015). "Simultaneous observation of the quantization and the interference pattern of a plasmonic near-field". Nature Communications. 6 6407. Bibcode:2015NatCo...6.6407P. doi:10.1038/ncomms7407. PMC 4366487. PMID 25728197.
- Piazza, L.; Masiel, D.J.; Lagrange, T.; Reed, B.W.; Barwick, B.; Carbone, Fabrizio (2013). "Design and implementation of a fs-resolved transmission electron microscope based on thermionic gun technology". Chemical Physics. 423: 79–84. Bibcode:2013CP....423...79P. doi:10.1016/j.chemphys.2013.06.026.
- Mansart, B.; Lorenzana, J.; Mann, A.; Odeh, A.; Scarongella, M.; Chergui, M.; Carbone, F. (2013). "Coupling of a high-energy excitation to superconducting quasiparticles in a cuprate from coherent charge fluctuation spectroscopy". Proceedings of the National Academy of Sciences. 110 (12): 4539–4544. Bibcode:2013PNAS..110.4539M. doi:10.1073/pnas.1218742110. PMC 3606993. S2CID 118367698.
- Carbone, F.; Kwon, O.-H.; Zewail, A. H. (2009). "Dynamics of Chemical Bonding Mapped by Energy-Resolved 4D Electron Microscopy". Science. 325 (5937): 181–184. Bibcode:2009Sci...325..181C. doi:10.1126/science.1175005. PMID 19589997. S2CID 206520587.
- Carbone, Fabrizio; Baum, Peter; Rudolf, Petra; Zewail, Ahmed H. (2008). "Structural Preablation Dynamics of Graphite Observed by Ultrafast Electron Crystallography" (PDF). Physical Review Letters. 100 (3) 035501. Bibcode:2008PhRvL.100c5501C. doi:10.1103/PhysRevLett.100.035501. hdl:11370/a0227dd1-0eb2-4685-a144-31e978713e8d. PMID 18232996. S2CID 7084389.
