= Aviad Hacohen =

Israeli attorney and professor of law

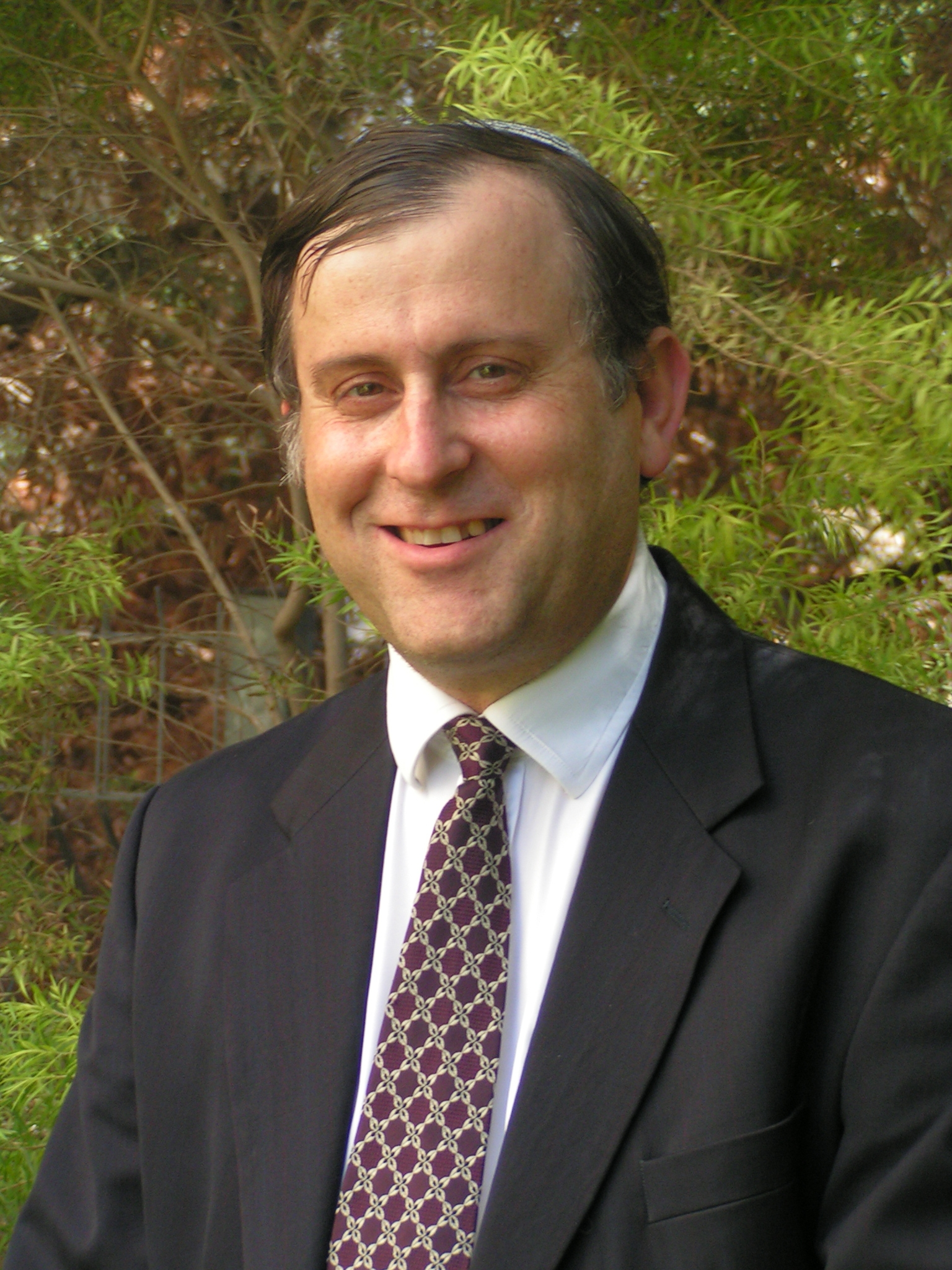
Aviad Hacohen

Aviad Hacohen (Hebrew: אביעד הכהן; born November 1 1962) is an Israeli attorney and professor of law.

== Biography ==
Aviad Hacohen is the son of Rabbi Menachem Hacohen, who was a Labor party member of the Israeli Parliament (Knesset), and Devorah Hacohen, a historian at Bar-Ilan University. Hacohen studied at Netiv Meir yeshiva high school and afterwards at Yeshivat Har Etzion and Yeshivat HaKotel. He served in the Israel Defense Forces in a hesder program combining yeshiva studies with army service. He received his BA in law from the Hebrew University of Jerusalem in 1989. In 1991, Hacohen began to teach as an assistant in the law school of the Hebrew University while studying for an MA in law, which he received cum laude in 1993. In 1995 he began to teach Jewish law and communications law at Bar Ilan University. In 1996, he was appointed Director of the Center for the Instruction and Study of Jewish Law at the Sha'arei Mishpat Academic Center, where he also served as a lecturer. He received his PhD (cum laude) in law from the law school of the Hebrew University in 2003.

== Legal career ==
While working as a lecturer in law, Hacohen participated in research institutes and forums, including the Van Leer Jerusalem Institute and Mosaica, the Institute for the Study of Religion, Society and State which he founded and heads.

Hacohen is a member of the editorial boards of the “Jewish Law Yearbook” (published by the Institute for Jewish Law of the law school of Hebrew University); “Medicine and Law”, “Machanaim”, “Masehkhet”, “Sha’arei Mishpat”, “Halishka – The Magazine of the Bar Association in Jerusalem”, “Alon Shvut for the Graduates of Yeshivat Har Etzion” and others.

Hacohen serves as the legal commentator for the newspaper “Israel Today”.

Since 1994, Hacohen has served as the general counsel for the Israel Festival and of the movement “Hakol Hinukh” [“Everything is Education”]. He is a member of the Israel Bar Associationthe Jerusalem Committee of the Bar Association, the disciplinary tribunal of the Bar Association and various public commissions. He is director and chairman of the Logistics Committee of the Birthright Program. He is a member of the Center for Women's Justice Israel, the Har Etzion Foundation and the Takana Forum that addresses sexual harassment in the religious community.

In 2011, Hacohen was appointed general counsel to Mifal HaPayis, the state lottery.

== Notable cases ==
- Represented the petitioners in a petition against the broadcasting on television of a docu-drama that sullied the reputation of Chana Senesh and dishonored her memory.
- Prevailed in a petition that he submitted on behalf of “Women in Green” and Nadia Matar for the right to hold a march on the night of Tisha B'Av around the walls of the Old City of Jerusalem.
- Argued in favor of permitting women to deliver eulogies at funerals.
- Represented the organizations Tzohar and Kolech in an attempt to prevent the appointment of ultra-Orthodox rabbinic court judges and represented women’s organizations in the arguments regarding the proposed plea bargain in the case of President Moshe Katzav.
- Represented the Center for Women’s Justice in a petition in 2006 intended to regulate the activities of a government fund that pays money to induce men who were refusing to grant divorces to their wives to grant the divorces, thereby indirectly encouraging them to withhold divorces. In the wake of the petition, the fund’s activities were regulated and criteria were established for its activities.
- Petitioned the High Court of Justice in June 2008, on behalf of a woman and her three children, as well as 11 organizations including Na'amat, Emunah, Wizo, the Center for Women’s Justice and the Ohr Torah institutions, when the woman’s conversion was decreed invalid by the rabbinic court 15 years after she converted.
- Represented women whose husbands had abandoned them or refused to give them divorces in proceedings before the Supreme Court.
- Represented residents of Gush Katif in petitions filed with the special committee pursuant to the Implementation of the Withdrawal Plan from Gaza Law.
- Represented residents of Kfar Maimon in a petition to the High Court of Justice in 2005, after the police prevented them from leaving the settlement due to the apprehension that they would join the demonstrators against the withdrawal from Gaza.
- Represented the Noar KaHalacha organization and Yoav Laloum, in 2008, in their petition to rule that the actions of the Beit Yaakov school in Emanuel constituted ethnic discrimination. The High Court of Justice accepted the petition and laid down basic legal principles regarding the right to equal education. In 2011, he filed an additional petition on behalf of the same petitioners against the Ministry of Education and the local authorities regarding the ethnic discrimination in institutions of secondary education for girls in the ultra-Orthodox sector.
- In 2008, he represented a junior fencer who successfully sued the Israel Fencing Association to require it to refrain temporarily from holding fencing competitions on Shabbat (the Jewish sabbath), saying that the Association's actions violated Israel's Equal Opportunities Act. The Israeli Supreme Court ruled that the Fencing Association’s practice was discriminatory, and ordered it to either allow the fencer to compete on a different day or hand him technical victories for any Sabbath match. But the ruling expired after two years, and did not result in any permanent change. The Israeli Supreme Court declined to intervene a second time.
- In a petition filed in 2009, seeking to indict the Rabbi of Tzefat, Rabbi Shmuel Eliyahu, for things he had said, successfully represented Rabbi Eliyahu, resulting in denial of the petition (HCJ 6702/05).
- Represented Nir Barkat, the mayor of Jerusalem, in 2010, in a petition that prevented manipulation in the selection process of the chief rabbis of Jerusalem.

In 2010-2011 represented Rachel Azaria, a member of the Jerusalem City Council in two petitions that sought to prevent gender segregation in the Mea Shearim neighborhood.

- In 2012 represented members of the Yerushalmim Movement in a petition to the High Court of Justice regarding the absence of pictures of women in advertisements on the buses in Jerusalem.

In 2008, Hacohen was among the members (3 out of 30) on the Central Elections Committee for the 18th Knesset who objected to the disqualification of the Arab lists to participate in the elections, a position that was backed up later in a Supreme Court decision to overrule the disqualification.

== Views and opinions ==
Hacohen is identified with the philosophy of Modern Orthodoxy, including the integration of Torah and academic pursuits. He expresses liberal economic positions and is among the founders of the organization Bema’aglei Tzedek. He has taken a stand in favor of outright warfare against the trade in women, and has called for working to increase public awareness of people with disabilities and insuring that their special needs are met, and closing the economic gaps in Israeli society. He has also expressed criticism of what he terms the negligence of the religious community in dealing with cases of sexual assault and refusal by men to give divorces to their wives.

== Published works ==
His book “The Tears of the Oppressed,” an examination of the agunah problem, was published in the United States in 2004. In this work Hacohen, relying on halakhic sources, proposes approaches for solving the problem of women unable to obtain a divorce. In 2011, his book “Parshiyot v’Mishpatim.” a collection of some of his articles, including chapters on human rights, criminal law and civil law and their relation to Jewish law, was published.
