= Human rights in Israel =

Israel is described in its Declaration of Independence as a "Jewish state" – the legal definition "Jewish and democratic state" was adopted in 1985. In addition to its Jewish majority in the area excluding the occupied Palestinian territories, Israel is home to religious and ethnic minorities, some of whom report discrimination. In the Palestinian territories, successive Israeli governments have been subject to international criticism from other countries as well as international and domestic human rights groups. One of the Basic Laws of Israel, intended to form the basis of a future constitution, Basic Law: Human Dignity and Liberty, is a major tool for safeguarding human rights and civil liberties in Israel. However, the United Nations Human Rights Council and Israeli human rights organization Adalah have highlighted that this law does not contain a general provision for equality and non-discrimination.

International human rights organizations, along with the United Nations and the United States Department of State, have reported human rights violations committed by Israel, particularly against minority groups. These reports include violations of the rights of Palestinians, both inside and outside Israel as well as other groups in Israel.

Freedom House in 2013 described Israel as more politically free and democratic than neighboring countries in the Middle East. According to the 2015 US Department of State's Country Reports on Human Rights Practices, Israel faces significant human rights problems regarding institutional discrimination against Arab citizens of Israel (many of whom self-identify as Palestinian), Ethiopian Israelis and women, and the treatment of refugees and irregular migrants. Other human rights problems include institutional discrimination against non-Orthodox Jews and intermarried families, and labor rights abuses against foreign workers.

== History ==
The Council of the League of Nations adopted a resolution on 4 September 1931 regarding the general conditions required before the mandate regime could be brought to an end. The new government was to provide an oral or written declaration acknowledging acceptance of an obligation to constitutionally guarantee the equal rights of ethnic and religious minorities. That resolution followed a longstanding precedent of international law in cases where the Great Powers had assisted in the restoration of sovereignty over a territory. The UN resolution on "The Future Government of Palestine" contained both a plan of partition and a Minority Protection Plan. It placed minority, women's, and religious rights under the protection of the United Nations and the International Court of Justice. The plan provided specific guarantees of fundamental human rights. The new states were to supply a declaration, which according to precedent was tantamount to a treaty. The resolution stated that "the stipulations contained in the declarations are recognized as fundamental laws of State, and no law, regulation or official action shall conflict or interfere with these stipulations, nor shall any law, regulation or official action prevail over them."

The Declaration of the Establishment of the State of Israel proclaimed, on 14 May 1948, that "the right of the Jewish people to national rebirth in its own country" was recognized in the Balfour Declaration of 2 November 1917, and re-affirmed in the Mandate of the League of Nations which, in particular, gave international sanction to the historic connection between the Jewish people and "Eretz-Israel [Land of Israel] and to the right of the Jewish people to rebuild its National Home." It also declared that the state "will be open for Jewish immigration and for the Ingathering of the Exiles; it will foster the development of the country for the benefit of all its inhabitants; it will be based on freedom, justice and peace as envisaged by the prophets of Israel; it will ensure complete equality of social and political rights to all its inhabitants irrespective of religion, race or sex; it will guarantee freedom of religion, conscience, language, education and culture; it will safeguard the Holy Places of all religions; and it will be faithful to the principles of the Charter of the United Nations."

Some British academics argue that Israel has not fulfilled its obligation to constitutionally protect minority rights.

Israeli Basic Law: Human Dignity and Liberty, states that fundamental human rights in Israel shall be upheld in the spirit of the principles set forth in the Declaration, but it specifically exempted legislation that was already in force. Israeli legal scholars say that the wording of the law was adopted to avoid the difficulty of giving priority to equality, which was not expressly entrenched. The result is that the principle of equality can be reversed by ordinary legislation, and furthermore will not override statutory or judge-made laws.

== Status of freedom, political rights and civil liberties in Israel ==
=== Citizenship rights ===
The Israeli the Nationality Law and the Law of Return, differentiate between Jewish Israelis and Palestinian Israelis by reifying the concept of Jewish nationality as separate from Israeli citizenship. Despite its title, the Nationality Law does not establish the notion of an Israeli nationality, instead associating nationality with religious affiliation.

The Nationality Law permits Palestinians to become citizens of Israel only if they were present (or are the descendants of those present) in Israel between 1948 and 1952. These constraints exclude all those who were expelled or who fled between December 1947 and March 1949 and their descendants. The Law of Return ensures the right of every Jew to immigrate to Israel and automatically become an Israeli citizen. Palestinians and their descendants who were expelled or fled between December 1947 and March 1949 are denied this right.

The Citizenship and Entry into Israel Law (2003) denies Palestinians from the occupied Palestinian territories the right to acquire Israeli residency or citizenship status, even in cases where they are married to citizens of Israel. This ban is based on nationality and not on individual case-by-case security concerns.

On 28 July 2008, the Knesset approved The Citizenship Law (Amendment No. 9) (Authority for Revoking Citizenship) (2008), which allows Israeli citizenship to be revoked on the basis of a "breach of trust". More specifically, breach of trust may include the act of residing in certain Arab or Muslim states or the Gaza Strip. Revocation of citizenship on this basis without a criminal conviction is permitted by this law.

=== Rights and liberties ratings by NGOs ===
The 2013 Freedom in the World annual survey and report by US-based Freedom House, which attempts to measure the degree of democracy and political freedom in every nation, ranked Israel along with Tunisia as the Middle East and North Africa's only free countries.

Rating of Israel, and its occupied territories, by Freedom House, The Economist Intelligence Unit and Transparency International
Country / Entity – NGO	Freedom House			The Economist Intelligence Unit		Transparency International
Report-Ranking	Freedom in the World			Democracy Index		Corruption Perceptions Index
	Freedom rating Free, Partly Free, Not Free	Political rights	Civil liberties	Democracy rating Full democracy, Flawed democracy, Hybrid regime, Authoritarian regime	Overall score	Political corruption perceptions
Israel	Free	1	2	Flawed democracy	7.79	6.0
Israeli occupied territories	Not Free	6	6	N/A	N/A	N/A

Notes

- Per Freedom House 2009 ratings. For political rights and civil liberties indices, 1 represents the most-free and 7 the least-free rating.
- Per The Economist Intelligence Unit 2010 ratings. Full democracies have an overall score of 10 to 8, flawed democracies have an overall score of 7.9 to 6, hybrid regimes have an overall score of 5.9 to 4, and authoritarian regimes have an overall score from 3.9 to 1. The extent of democracy is higher as the score increases.
- According to the annual Transparency International Corruption Perceptions Index, the score ranges from 10 (squeaky clean) to 0 (highly corrupt).

Israeli citizens and human rights organizations have criticized the Israeli government for assailing civil society organizations and human rights activists in recent years. According to the Association for Civil Rights in Israel (ACRI), Israel's oldest and largest civil liberties organization, a series of Israeli government efforts in recent years have attacked Israeli civil society and the Supreme Court of Israel. A December 2017 ACRI report presents what it views as examples of persistent Israeli government attack against Israeli democracy, human rights, the right to protest, respect for the underlying value of equality, and the liberties of political, social and ethnic minorities. This trend in Israel has been called "constitutional retrogression" by some legal analysts.

=== Elections, political parties, and representation ===
According to the 2015 US Department of State report on Israel, "The law provides citizens the ability to choose their government in free and fair periodic elections based on universal and equal suffrage, and citizens exercised this ability." Elections held in March 2015 were considered free and fair by observers. A change in the electoral threshold was criticized as limiting representation of small parties, particularly affecting the Arab minority. This resulted in the four Arab-majority parties uniting into one faction, the Joint List, which won 13 seats and became the third-largest faction in the Knesset. Most Palestinians in the Israeli-occupied territories live under Israeli occupation and are not Israeli citizens. They are not allowed to vote in Israel.

The Basic Law: The Knesset (1958) and the amendments that followed prevent a party list from running for election to the Knesset if its objectives or actions include the "negation of the existence of the State of Israel as the state of the Jewish people". The Israeli legal center Adalah states that "this law obstructs the free exercise of political rights, including the rights to political speech and participation. It is often used to try to prevent Arab political parties and parliamentarians from seeking to alter the character of the state through democratic means, for example, to a state based on full civil and national equality that does not grant preference to one national group over the other, and even to block debate on such proposals."

Women faced significant cultural barriers in political parties representing conservative religious movements and, to a lesser degree, the Arab minority. In the 2015 election, the 120-member Knesset had 29 female members and 15 Arab members. Three women were appointed to the cabinet, and for the first time, an Arab Israeli chaired a permanent committee.

=== Freedom of religion ===
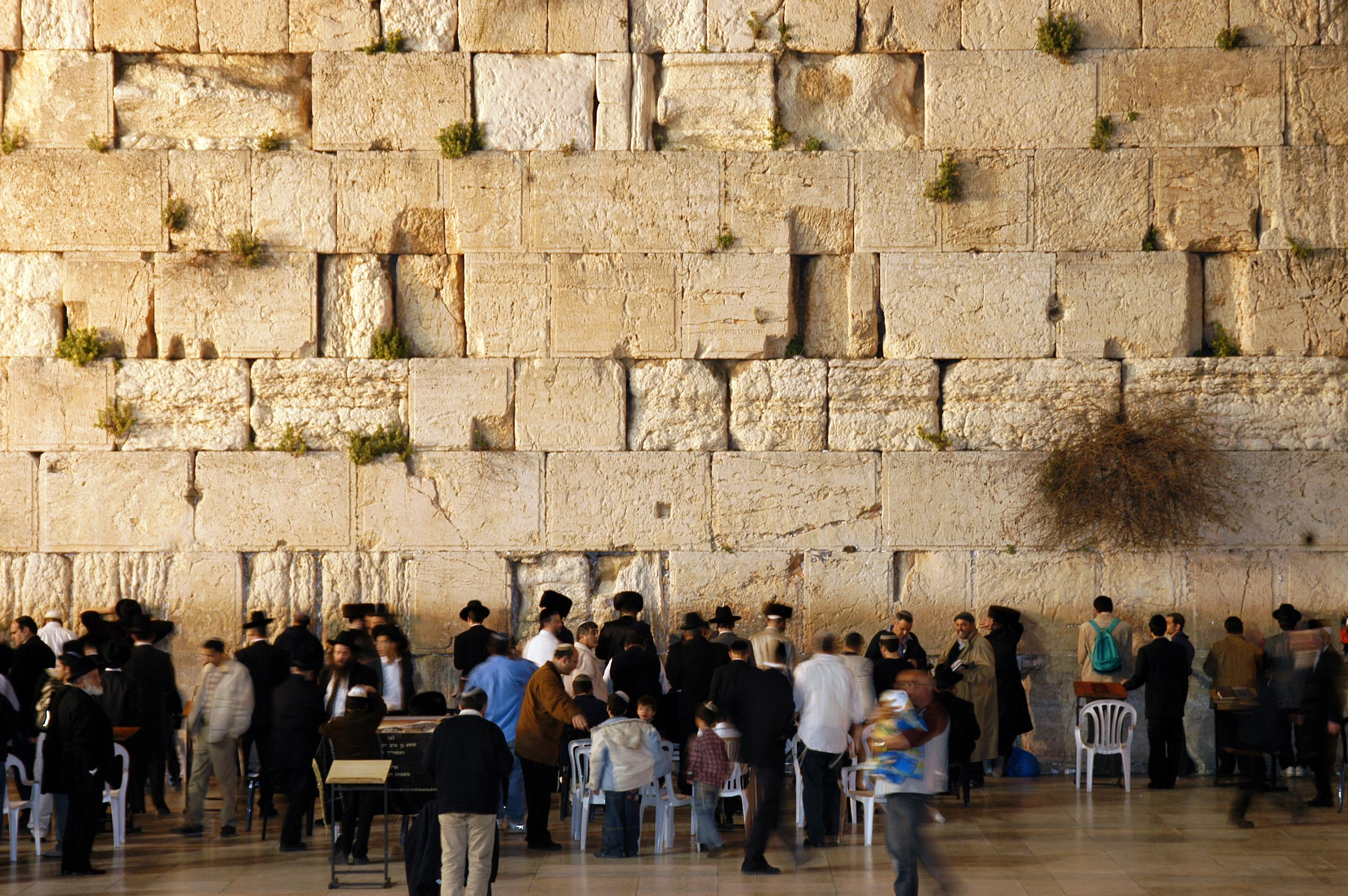
Western Wall, Jerusalem

According to the 2009 US Department of State report on Israel and the occupied territories, "The Israeli Basic Law on Human Dignity and Liberty provides for freedom of worship and the Government generally respected this right in practice." The report added that "Government policy continued to support the generally free practice of religion, although governmental and legal discrimination against non-Jews and non-Orthodox streams of Judaism continued" and "Many Jewish citizens objected to exclusive Orthodox control over fundamental aspects of their personal lives." The report stated that approximately 310,000 citizens who immigrated to Israel under the Law of Return are not considered Jewish by the Orthodox Rabbinate and therefore cannot be married or divorced, or buried in Jewish state cemeteries within the country.

After gaining control of the West Bank in 1967, Israel guaranteed Muslim access to mosques, including Al-Aqsa, and Christian access to churches. Israel has extended protection to religious sites of non-Jewish religions; most famously the Israel Defense Forces (IDF) arrested a man who notified them of his plans to attack the Al-Aqsa Mosque. At times, the observances of holy days by various religions has the potential to cause conflict; thus Israeli police take measures to avoid friction between communities by issuing temporary restrictions on movement and audible worship.

According to a 2009 report from the US Department of State's Bureau of Democracy, Human Rights, and Labor, Israel falls short of being a tolerant or pluralistic society. According to the report, Israel discriminates against Muslims, Jehovah's Witnesses, Reform Jews, Christians, women and Bedouins. All 137 official holy sites recognized by Israel are Jewish, ignoring and neglecting Christian and Muslim sites, despite the 1967 Protection of Holy Sites Law being intended to protect all holy sites.

The Baháʼí Faith (in 1960) maintains the seat of their governing bodies, the Universal House of Justice, in Haifa. Buddhism is also active as a religion in Israel.

The Pew Research Center has published studies of social hostilities by country. The Social Hostilities Index (SHI) measures acts of religious hostility by individuals, organizations and social groups. "This includes mob or sectarian violence, harassment over attire for religious reasons, and other religion-related intimidation or abuse." In 2007, Israel was one of 10 countries with a score over 7.1 on a scale of 10; in 2010, Israel and the Palestinian territories were two of the 15 areas with the highest SHI scores.

=== Marriage and divorce laws ===
A couple wishing to marry can do so only through a religious ceremony, if Jewish, Muslim, Christian, or other. Non-religious couples, since 2014, can have a kind of civil marriage in Israel, and get through New Family Organization a Relationships Card that changes their status to a couple, and entitles them with all of the rights that come from it. Common-law marriage gives couples the same rights as married couples enjoy. Israeli citizens may also travel abroad for a civil marriage, which is then binding under Israeli law.

During the Al-Aqsa Intifada in 2003, the Knesset made a temporary amendment to the Citizenship and Entry into Israel Law which prohibited Palestinians married to Israelis from gaining Israeli citizenship or residency. Critics argue that the law is racist because it is targeted at Israeli Arabs who are far more likely to have Palestinian spouses than other Israelis; defenders say the law is aimed at preventing terrorist attacks and preserving the Jewish character of Israel. The United Nations Committee on the Elimination of Racial Discrimination unanimously approved a resolution saying that the Israeli law violated an international human rights treaty against racism. The Israeli Ambassador to the UN in Geneva, Yaakov Levy, said the resolution was "highly politicized", citing the committee's failure to grant Israel's request to present evidence of the "legislation's compliance with existing international law and practice", examples of "numerous concrete instances [in which the] granting of a legal status to Palestinian spouses of Israeli residents [was] abused by Palestinian residents of the territories for suicide terrorism", and also ignoring the fact that at the time of the UN resolution the matter was under review by the Israeli High Court of Justice.

The Association for Civil Rights in Israel (ACRI) filed a petition to have the law struck down but it was upheld by a High Court decision in 2006. In formulating the law, the government cited, "information presented by the security forces, which said that the terrorist organizations try to enlist Palestinians who have already received or will receive Israeli documentation and that the security services have a hard time distinguishing between Palestinians who might help the terrorists and those who will not". In the Israeli Supreme Court decision on this matter, Deputy Chief Justice Mishael Cheshin argued that, "Israeli citizens [do not] enjoy a constitutional right to bring a foreign national into Israel... and it is the right – moreover, it is the duty – of the state, of any state, to protect its residents from those wishing to harm them. And it derives from this that the state is entitled to prevent the immigration of enemy nationals into it – even if they are spouses of Israeli citizens – while it is waging an armed conflict with that same enemy".

In 2009, the US Department of State's Bureau of Democracy, Human Rights and Labor criticized the lack of civil marriage and divorce in Israel for immigrants who are not considered Jewish under rabbinical law.

Human rights activists have criticised Israel's stay of exit order, saying it unfairly targets divorced men by preventing them from leaving the country indefinitely until they settle the full child support arrears of their children until age 18. While this could easily amount to obligations in the millions of US dollars, even a US$100 debt can trigger a stay of exit. The men are required to pay 100% or more of their income, and are jailed for 21 days each time they miss a monthly payment. In 2021, it was reported that an Australian man who was divorced from his Israeli wife was detained from leaving the country in 2013, with the stay of exit being in force until 31 December 9999, or until he paid $3 million in child support arrears. Marianne Azizi, British journalist and head of Coalition of the Children and Families in Israel (CCF), estimated that hundreds more Australians were trapped in the country as a result of the stay of exit. She had been informed by British Embassy officials in Tel Aviv that 100 British nationals per month had been reaching out to them for help in getting out of the country.

In March 2019, Azizi testified in front of the United Nations Committee on Economic, Social and Cultural Rights in Geneva about the human rights violations she maintained were a direct result of the over-the-top child support rules in Israel, saying that "... the lives of over 2,000 fathers in suicide is a high price". She said that Israelis do not report human rights violations for fear of "consequences", such as some activists having had their children taken away from them. Attorney Mickey Givati, who was authorised by the British Embassy to help foreigners exit Israel, testified that tracking devices had been placed inside his vehicle, home and phone, and that his children were illegally placed in a shelter.

=== Judiciary system and criminal justice ===
Israeli law provides for the right to a fair trial and an independent judiciary. The 2005 US Department of State report on Israel notes that the courts sometimes ruled against the executive branch, including in some security cases. Human Rights Groups believe these requirements are generally respected. The system is adversarial and cases are decided by professional judges. Indigent defendants receive mandatory representation. Some areas of the country fall under the separate judicial jurisdiction of military courts. These courts are believed to be in alignment with Israel's other criminal courts on matters pertaining to civilians. Convictions in these courts cannot be based on confession alone.

=== Capital punishment ===
Israeli law currently allows for the death penalty for serious crimes committed during wartime, but it has been abolished during peacetime. Current crimes during wartime include genocide, crimes against the Jewish people, crimes against humanity, and war crimes. The only person to have ever been executed after conviction in an Israeli civilian court was the Nazi war-criminal Adolf Eichmann.

=== Rights of prisoners ===
Torture is reported by B'Tselem as having been carried out against individuals not suspected of crime, including religious sages, sheiks and religious leaders, persons active in charitable organizations, and Islamic students. Others to be tortured include brothers and other relatives of persons listed as "wanted" and any Palestinians in the engineering profession. In some cases, wives of the detained have been arrested and mistreated to further pressure their husbands. ISA agents have sometimes tortured Palestinians in order to recruit them as collaborators.

B'Tselem estimates that the ISA annually interrogates between 1,000 and 1,500 Palestinians and uses methods constituting torture against some 85 percent of them, at least 850 persons a year.

Amnesty International has also reported the use of torture against Palestinian detainees, along with arbitrary detention, without trial. Amnesty reported over 2,200 Palestinians were detained from the occupied West Bank in the first month of the 2023 Gaza war. Accounts and video recordings show the torturing of detainees, including severe beatings and humiliation of detainees, such as by forcing them to keep their heads down, to kneel on the floor during inmate count, and to sing Israeli songs.

A 1978 report from the Consulate General in Jerusalem described the military trial of two young American citizens who reported that Israeli authorities used physical coercion to obtain confessions from them. The report concluded that Israeli authorities were aware that "physical coercion and mistreatment" probably had been used to obtain the confessions.

The 1987 Landau Commission, headed by then-Supreme Court Justice Moshe Landau, was appointed to examine the interrogation methods of the Israel Security Agency (ISA) and said that "the exertion of a moderate degree of physical pressure cannot be avoided". Nevertheless, the commission condemned a 1982 internal memo that instructed interrogators on the kind of lies they should tell in court when denying they'd used physical force to obtain confessions. It condemned the perjury involved but advised against prosecution of those who'd carried it out. The second part of the Landau report remains secret, it is believed to contain guidelines for permissible interrogation methods.

The Landau Commission resulted in hundreds of petitions by detained Palestinians complaining that force had been used against them during ISA interrogations. In isolated cases, interim orders were issued temporarily prohibiting the ISA from using all or some of the methods, but in September 1999, the High Court refused to rule whether they are legal under Israeli and international law.

In 1994, a State Comptroller's Report (partly released in summary form in February 2000) found that ISA interrogation methods contravened the law, the Landau Commission guidelines, and the internal guidelines formulated by the service itself.

In July 2002, Haaretz quoted a senior ISA official saying that, since the High Court's decision, 90 Palestinians had been defined as "ticking bombs" and "extraordinary interrogation methods," i.e. torture, was used against them. Other Israeli interrogators have admitted that the ISA "uses every manipulation possible, up to shaking and beating." Dozens of affidavits from Palestinians also confirm that torture is still part of Israeli interrogations.

According to a 2011 report by two Israeli human rights organisations, the Public Committee Against Torture (PCAT) and Physicians for Human Rights (PHR), Israeli doctors fail to report suspected torture and conceal related information, allowing Israeli Security Agency interrogators to use torture against Palestinian detainees.

In August 2015, a law authorized force-feeding of hunger-striking prisoners. However, the Israel Medical Association declared the legislation unethical and urged doctors to refuse to implement it.

==== Education programs ====
Prisoners are allowed to take online courses from the Open University of Israel, and to complete academic degrees. This is not a vested right but a benefit, contingent on good behavior, with prison authorities paying their university tuition. The courses are in the fields of: humanities, sociology, economics, management, psychology and political-science. The intention is to give the prisoners the tools to deal with life outside, so that upon release from prison they will have the appropriate education to help them obtain jobs, and prevent them from returning to a life of crime.

==== Political prisoners ====
In 2011, UN Secretary-General Ban Ki-Moon said Israel held thousands of Palestinians as political prisoners, and called on Israel to release them. Ban said the release of political prisoners would "serve as a significant confidence-building measure" and boost prospects of peace in the region. Amnesty International has called on Israel to release political prisoners, saying "all political prisoners held without charge or trial should be tried in fair trials or immediately released".

John Dugard has compared Israeli imprisonment of Palestinians to policies of Apartheid-era South Africa, saying "Apartheid's security police practiced torture on a large scale. So do the Israeli security forces. There were many political prisoners on Robben Island but there are more Palestinian political prisoners in Israeli jails."

===== Administrative detention =====
Administrative detention is a procedure under which prisoners are held without charge or trial. The sentences are authorized by an administrative order from the Israeli Ministry of Defence or Israeli military commanders. Amnesty International believes that the practice breaches Article 9 of the International Covenant on Civil and Political Rights which "makes clear that no-one should be subjected to arbitrary detention and that deprivation of liberty must be based on grounds and procedures established by law". Amnesty International is also concerned that prisoners of conscience are being "held solely for the non-violent exercise of their right to freedom of expression and association". According to B'Tselem there are currently 645 Palestinians being held under administrative detention by the Israel Prisons Service and 105 by the IDF. Most are kept in the West Bank in Ofer Military Camp or in the Ansar 3/Ketziot Military Camp in the Negev desert.

===== Education programs in prison for Security Imprisonments =====
In 2009, there were 250 Palestinian prisoners studying at Israel's Open University. In June 2011, Prime Minister Benjamin Netanyahu announced, in response to a halt in the peace talks, that Palestinian prisoners would no longer be granted the right to pursue academic degrees in prison. In late 2012, three prisoners appealed the decision to the Israeli Supreme Court, which rejected their appeal. In their ruling, the judges stated that the right to free university education does not apply to those convicted of terror offenses. The ruling did, however, call on prison authorities to be "considerate" in deciding the cases of prisoners already in the midst of academic programs.

=== Freedom of speech and the media ===
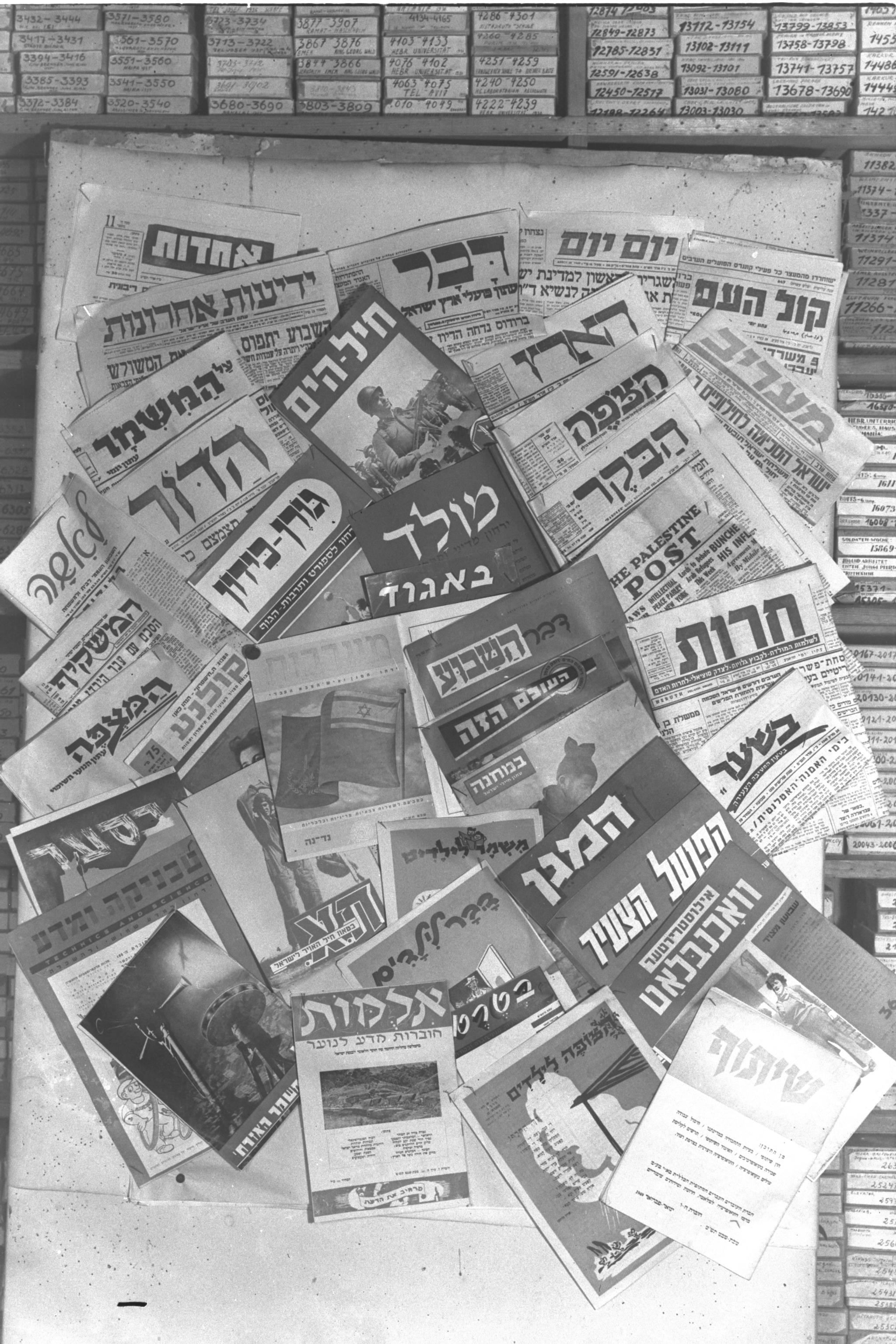
A cross-section of Israel's local newspapers in 1949.

Censorship in Israel is officially carried out by the Israeli Military Censor, a unit in the Israeli government officially tasked with carrying out preventive censorship regarding the publication of information that might affect the security of Israel. The body is headed by the Israeli Chief Censor, a military official appointed by Israel's Minister of Defense, who bestows upon the Chief Censor the authority to suppress information he deems compromising from being made public in the media, such as Israel's nuclear weapons program and Israel's military operations outside its borders. On average, 2240 press articles in Israel are censored by the Israeli Military Censor each year, approximately 240 of which in full, and around 2000 partially.

Articles concerning potentially controversial topics must be submitted to the Israeli Military Censor in advance; failing to do so may cause the reporter to lose his right to work as a journalist in Israel and, in the case of foreign reporters, to be barred from the country.

Within Israel, policies of its government are subjected to criticism by its press as well as a variety of political, human rights and watchdog groups, which include Association for Civil Rights in Israel (ACRI), B'Tselem, Machsom Watch, Women in Black and Women for Israel's Tomorrow. According to the press freedom organization Reporters Without Borders, "The Israeli media were once again in 2005 the only ones in the region that had genuine freedom to speak out." However, in 2010, human rights groups operating in Israel complained of a hostile environment in the country, and said they were coming under attack for criticising Israeli policies. The groups say that some Israeli leaders see human rights criticism as a threat to Israel's legitimacy, especially following war crimes allegations against the Israeli military over the Gaza War (2008–09).

Some government officials and others have been critical of the freedom of speech rights afforded to Israeli settlers during their forced evacuation from the Gaza Strip and the West Bank. This led to the criticism that "the authorities took disproportional steps, unjustifiably infringing on the right to political expression and protest."

==== Israeli government efforts to curtail speech ====
In 2003, Israel's film board banned the commercial screening of a film about the 2002 Battle of Jenin. The film, Jenin, Jenin, was a collection of interviews with residents of the Jenin refugee camp filmed in April 2002, a week after the battle. Mohammad Bakri, an Israeli Arab, directed the film. The film was banned due to its allegations of war crimes committed by Israeli forces, which the board deemed false and hurtful to the soldiers' families. Following legal proceedings, a petition was filed to the Supreme Court of Israel, which unanimously overturned the board's decision, and allowed the movie to be shown in cinemas "for the public to decide", while noting that the movie was "full of lies", was not a documentary, and was made "without good faith", falsely portraying the Israeli soldiers as "the worst of war crime perpetrators".

In January 2011, the Israeli parliament endorsed a right-wing proposal to investigate some of Israel's best-known human rights organisations for "delegitimising" its military. The investigations would entail inquiries into the funding of several human rights groups that have criticised Israeli policies. The Association for Civil Rights in Israel described the decision as a "severe blow" to Israeli democracy, and critics labeled the policy as "McCarthyist".

In 2015, the Israeli Supreme Court upheld major provisions of a law imposing consequences on those who call for boycotting Israel and occupied territories. The ruling sparked debate, with some protesting it ends freedom of speech while others say it affirms Israel's stand on "the destructive nature of the BDS" (Boycott, Divestment and Sanctions movement). Israeli human rights groups had petitioned against the law, saying it infringes on freedom of speech. Supporters of the law say it prohibits "discrimination based on geography." "To exclude calls for a boycott from the category of free speech is incorrect," said Rabbi David Rosenn, New Israel Fund's (NIF) executive vice president. "There is not a separate category for speech that is political. The most important speech is political, and people should have the ability to express their opinions without fear of government sanctions."

The law empowers police to limit incitement to violence or hate speech and criminalizes calling persons "Nazis" or "fascists". The Prevention of Terrorism Ordinance prohibits expressing support for an organization deemed to be illegal or terrorist in nature.

On 24 November 2024, Israel's government ordered a boycott of the newspaper Haaretz by government officials and anyone working for a government-funded body, and banned government advertising with the newspaper. According to The Guardian, Haaretz "had published a series of investigations of wrongdoing or abuses by senior officials and the armed forces, and has long been in the crosshairs of the current government."

According to the 2005 US Department of State report on Israel, "[t]he law provides for freedom of speech and of the press, and the government generally respected these rights in practice subject to restrictions concerning security issues." The law provides for freedom of assembly and association, and the government generally respected these rights in practice.

==== Freedom Index ====
Reporters Without Borders publishes an annual report on worldwide press freedom, called the Press Freedom Index. The first such publication began in 2002. The results for Israel and the Palestinian Authority from 2002 to the present are shown below, with lower numbers indicating better treatment of reporters:

Year	Israel (Israeli territory)	Israel (extraterritorial)	Palestinian Authority	Year's Worst Score	Report URL
2002	92	Not Specified	82	139	
2003	44	146	130	166	
2004	36	115	127	167	
2005	47	Not Specified	132	167	
2006	50	135	134	168	
2007	44	103	158	169	
2008	46	149	163	173	
2009	93	150	161	175	

In 2009, Israel ranked 93rd in the Reporters Without Borders Press Freedom Index, down from the previous year. In 2013, Israel slipped to 112 out of 179 countries in the press Freedom Index. Reporters without borders explained the change was due to Israeli actions in Operation Pillar of Defense during which it said "Israel Defense Forces intentionally attacked journalists and buildings where media connected to Hamas had premises". The organization also criticized arrests of Palestinian journalists and military censorship. Freedom House ranked Israel as having a "Partly Free" media climate in 2009. Previously, Israel have been the only country in the region ranked with a "Free" media.) In 2023, Israel proper, not including the Gaza Strip or East Jerusalem, was listed as "Free", while the Gaza Strip and the West Bank were rated "Not Free".

In 2023, a report by the Committee to Protect Journalists indicated that Israel ranked sixth highest in the world for arresting journalists. During the Gaza war, Palestinians described military harassment over their social media posts. In 2024, the Committee to Protect Journalists ranked Israel as the second worst country in the world for allowing the murderers of journalists to go unpunished.

According to a May 2026 Haaretz investigation, Israel's Education Ministry operated a secret surveillance body known as the "Incitement Committee" that monitored teachers' political speech and social media activity. The committee, headed by a former Shin Bet operative, collected information on teachers' professional histories, online posts, and personal data from law enforcement agencies, compiling it into "intelligence reports" without the teachers' knowledge. The investigation found that between 2023 and 2025, 157 teachers were examined, of whom 118 (75%) were Arab. The committee recommended disciplinary action against 52 teachers, with seven ultimately dismissed.

Reported cases included Arab teachers investigated over "Stop the war" social media posts, liking pro-Palestinian content, or participating in a Nakba Day march. Some Jewish educators who opposed the government or the Gaza war were also investigated. In July 2025, the Association for Civil Rights in Israel (ACRI) and Tel Aviv University's Labor Rights Clinic filed a High Court petition to end the covert monitoring, warning of a "chilling effect" on freedom of expression for tens of thousands of teaching personnel.

The Education Ministry denied the allegations, stating the committee only handled cases involving incitement or terrorism-related concerns, not political criticism. However, former ministry officials quoted by Haaretz likened the committee's practices to those of "dark regimes."

== Right to privacy ==
According to a 2005 US Department of State report on Israel, "[l]aws and regulations provide for protection of privacy of the individual and the home. In criminal cases the law permits wiretapping under court order; in security cases the defense ministry must issue the order."

== Women's rights ==
Marriage and divorce are under the jurisdiction of religious courts, which has in practice lead to systematic discrimination against women in these legal domains.

Israel has passed legislation legally protecting women from domestic violence. In 2022, 24 women were killed by their partners or other relatives according to the Israeli police, with 69 women total reported killed in Israel between 2020 and August 2022. 40 of these women were Palestinian, more than half of these cases have not been resolved by the police. In contrast, the cases of each of the 29 murders of Jewish-Israeli women have been resolved.

Israel has ratified the Convention on the Elimination of All Forms of Discrimination against Women.

Women in Israel have not always explicitly been guaranteed gender equality. Though the Israeli Declaration of Independence states that "The State of Israel [...] will ensure complete equality of social and political rights to all its inhabitants irrespective of religion, race or sex," this sentiment was not given constitutional force. However, the Israeli courts have, over time, articulated that gender equality is "a basic principle of the legal system" in Israel, and women have seen greater participation in Israeli public life.

In 1969, Israel elected Golda Meir as prime minister and became the fourth country to have a woman holding such an office. In 2010, women's parliamentary representation in Israel was 18 percent, which is above the Arab world's average of 6 percent, equal to that of the US Congress, and far below the Scandinavian countries' 40-percent average.

The Israeli parliament, The Knesset, has established The Committee on the Status of Women to address women's rights. The stated objectives of this committee are to prevent discrimination, combat violence against women, and promote equality in politics, lifecycle events and education. In 1998, the Knesset passed a law for "Prevention of Sexual Harassment".

A 2009 report of the US Department of State mentions the problems of civil marriage, agunot ('chained' women unable to divorce without their husband's permission), and mixed-gender prayer services at the Western Wall.

Women's rights are promoted through "Bringing Women to the Fore: The Feminist Partnership", coordinated through the Jewish Women's Collaborative International Fund. The seven partnering organizations in Israel are Adva Center, Women's Spirit, Itach-Maaki: Women Lawyers for Social Justice, Mahut Center, The Israel Women's Network (IWN), Economic Empowerment for Women (EEW) and Achoti (Sister) for Women in Israel.

=== Arab women in Israel ===
Arab-Israeli women actively participate in government and public life. Hussniya Jabara was the first Israeli-Arab woman to serve in the Knesset. According to section 15 of the States Civil Service [appointments], women and Arab-Israeli citizens are entitled to affirmative action in civil service employment.

=== Affirmative action ===
According to section 15 of the States Civil Service [appointments], female Israeli citizens are entitled to affirmative action in civil service employment.

== LGBT rights ==
Rights for sexual minorities in Israel are considered to be the most tolerant in the Middle East. While Israel has not legalized same-sex marriage, same-sex marriages valid in foreign countries are legally recognized in Israel. Israel guarantees civil rights for its homosexual population, including adoption rights and partner benefits. Israel also grants a common-law marriage status for same-sex domestic partners. The sodomy law inherited from the British Mandate of Palestine was repealed in 1988, though there was an explicit instruction issued in 1953 by the Attorney General of Israel ordering the police to refrain from enforcing this law, so long as no other offenses were involved. A national gay rights law bans some anti-gay discrimination, including in employment; some exemptions are made for religious organizations. In the past, military service of homosexuals was subject to certain restrictions. These restrictions were lifted in 1993, allowing homosexuals to serve openly in all units of the army.

In March 2014, the Ministry of Health issued a directive stating that sex-reassignment surgery was included among subsidized health services provided to citizens. Despite this, in May Haaretz reported that a health maintenance organization refused to pay for two sex-change surgeries, resulting in significant expenses by the patients. A national LGBTI task force found that 80 percent of transgender persons, 50 percent of lesbians and 20 percent of gay men were discriminated against when seeking employment.

== Land rights ==
The Jewish National Fund (JNF) controls 13% of land in the State of Israel; this land is reserved for the exclusive use of Israeli Jews. Less than 4% of the land in Israel is owned by Arab citizens, despite Arabs consisting of 20% of the population. Taken cumulatively, 93% of the land in Israel is controlled by either the state of Israel or the JNF; these lands are officially referred to as "Israeli lands."

A recent amendment (enacted in 2010) to The Land Ordinance (Acquisition for Public Purposes) (1943), aims to affirm state ownership of land confiscated from Palestinians (from 1948 onward) by blocking Palestinian claims to land confiscated under this ordinance, even where it was never used for the alleged public purpose for which it was originally confiscated.

The Israeli legal center Adalah reports that "Palestinian citizens of Israel are, in practice, blocked from purchasing or leasing land on around 80% of the land in Israel on the basis of their national belonging." The result, they say, is that "the vast majority of state land consists of segregated, Jewish-only areas." Adalah describes the two main mechanisms by which exclusion from land ownership and use are enacted; through so-called "admissions committees" and through what Adalah describes as discriminatory policies of state authorities and the JNF.

These admissions committees screen applicants for housing units in agricultural and community towns in Israel and include a senior official from the World Zionist Organization or The Jewish Agency. Almost 700 towns in Israel (accounting for almost 70% of all towns in Israel) have associated admissions committees. The criteria applied by these committees includes a suitability criteria, which Adalah describes as arbitrary and lacking transparency. Adalah reports that Arabs and other marginalized groups in Israel are filtered out using this suitability criteria. These groups include Mizrahi Jews and gays.

Further, several towns in Israel have approved bylaws that stress their Jewish character, conditioning admission into the community on "loyalty to the Zionist vision."

Discriminatory land policies are to a large extent driven by the policies of the JNF, to which 13% of the total land of Israel was transferred from the state between 1949 and 1953. Fifty percent of the seats in the ILA council are allocated to JNF representatives (as per The ILA Law (1960)) giving the JNF a large role in defining Israeli land policies over 93% of state land (so called "Israel land"). One such policy prohibits JNF land to be allocated to non-Jews.

== Ethnic minorities, anti-discrimination and immigration laws ==
Israel has ratified the International Covenant on Economic, Social and Cultural Rights and International Convention on the Elimination of All Forms of Racial Discrimination treaties.

Ethnic and religious minorities have full voting rights in Israel and are entitled to government benefits under various laws. Israel's Employment Law (1988) prohibits discrimination–in hiring, working conditions, promotion, professional training or studies, discharge or severance pay, and benefits and payments provided for employees in connection with their retirement from employment–due to race, religion, nationality, and land of origin, among other reasons.

Proportion of Arab employees in Various Ministries
Ministry	% Arab employees
Health	7.2
Education	6.2
Justice	3.9
Industry, Trade and Labor	3.4
Transport	2.3
Housing	1.3
Finance	1.2

Despite the Employment Law (1998), the Israel human rights group Adalah has reported that Palestinian citizens of Israel face discrimination in work opportunities, pay and conditions. Adalah has also reported that the state of Israel itself (the largest employer in Israel) does not enforce said law. As an example, Palestinian citizens of Israel employed as contractors in renovations at Israeli educational institutions are subject to limitations which Jewish Israelis are not subject to. This includes the requiring the contractor to hire an armed security guard on the premises of the work site at their own expense.

According to section 15 of the States Civil Service [appointments], Israeli citizens who are female, disabled, or of Arab or black African origin are entitled to affirmative action in the civil service. Israeli citizens of Arab or black African origin, or with disabilities, are furthermore entitled to affirmative action with regard to university and college admission, and are entitled to full tuition scholarships by the state.

Prohibition of Discrimination in Products, Services and Entry into Places of Entertainment and Public Places Law forbids those who operate public places, or provide services or products, to discriminate because of race, religion, nationality, and land of origin, among other reasons. According to the 2010 US Department of State's Country Reports on Human Rights Practices for Israel and the Occupied Territories, Israeli law prohibits discrimination on the basis of race, and the government effectively enforced these prohibitions.

Employment Distribution by Sector and Ethnicity (2008)
Occupation	Arab employees (%)	Jewish employees (%)
Construction (males)	28.4	5.4
Unskilled workers	14.6	6.4
Business activities	5.6	14.3
Managerial positions	2.3	7.3
Banking, insurance, and finance	0.8	4.3

=== Arab citizens of Israel ===
Human rights group B'Tselem has claimed that Arabs in Jerusalem are denied residency rights, leading to a housing shortage in the Arab areas of Jerusalem.

Human Rights Watch has charged that cuts in veteran benefits and child allowances based on parents' military service discriminate against Arab children: "The cuts will also affect the children of Jewish ultra-orthodox parents who do not serve in the military, but they are eligible for extra subsidies, including educational supplements, not available to Palestinian Arab children."

According to the 2004 US Department of State's Country Reports on Human Rights Practices for Israel and the Occupied Territories, the Israeli government had done "little to reduce institutional, legal, and societal discrimination against the country's Arab citizens." Reports of subsequent years also identified discrimination against Arab citizens as a problem area for Israel, but did not repeat the assertion that Israel had done little to reduce discrimination.

The 2004 US State Department Country Reports on Human Rights Practices notes that:

- The Jewish National Fund (JNF) controls 12.5 percent of public land but its statutes prohibit the sale or lease of land to non-Jews. In October, civil rights groups petitioned the High Court of Justice claiming that a bid announcement by the Israel Land Administration (ILA) involving JNF land was discriminatory in that it banned Arabs from bidding. In January 2005, the attorney general ruled that "the government cannot discriminate against Israeli Arabs in marketing and allocating lands it manages," including those of the JNF.
- Israeli-Arab advocacy groups claim that the government is more restrictive in issuing building permits for Arab communities and challenge the policy of demolishing illegal buildings in the Arab sector, limiting the community's growth.
- "In June, the Supreme Court ruled that omitting Arab towns from specific government social and economic plans is discriminatory. This judgment builds on previous assessments of disadvantages suffered by Arab Israelis."
- The 1996 Master Plan for the Northern Areas of Israel was challenged as discriminatory. Its priorities included "increasing the Galilee's Jewish population and blocking the territorial contiguity of Arab towns."
- Exempt from mandatory military service, most Israeli Arabs thus had less access than other citizens to social and economic benefits for which military service was a prerequisite or an advantage, such as housing, new-household subsidies, and employment, especially government or security-related industrial employment. The Ivri Committee on National Service has issued official recommendations to the Government that Israel Arabs be afforded an opportunity to perform national service.
- "According to a 2003 Haifa University study, a tendency existed to impose heavier prison terms to Arab citizens than to Jewish citizens. Human rights advocates claimed that Arab citizens were more likely to be convicted of murder and to have been denied bail."
- The Or Commission report on the police killing of Israeli-Arab demonstrators found "primarily neglectful and discriminatory" government management of the Arab sector, with unfair allocation or resources resulting in "serious distress" by the community. Evidence of distress included poverty, unemployment, land shortage, educational problems, and defective infrastructure.

The 2005 US Department of State report on Israel wrote: "[T]he government generally respected the human rights of its citizens; however, there were problems in some areas, including... institutional, legal, and societal discrimination against the country's Arab citizens."

In a report submitted to the United Nations, Bedouin claimed that they face discrimination and are not treated as equal citizens in Israel and that Bedouin towns are not provided the same level of services or land of Jewish towns of the same size, and they are not given fair access to water. The city of Be'er Sheva refused to recognize a Bedouin holy site, despite a High Court recommendation.

The 2007 U.S. State Department Country Reports on Human Rights Practices notes that:

- "According to a 2005 study at Hebrew University, three times more money was invested in education of Jewish children as in Arab children."

In September 2010, the Israeli government endorsed an amendment to the country's citizenship laws. The draft law obliges that any person applying for an Israeli citizenship to pledge an oath of allegiance to "Israel as a Jewish and democratic state". The amendment has been strongly criticized by Israeli Arabs as well as by Israeli left-wing movements including Kadima opposition party chief Tzipi Livni. Israeli educational psychologist Prof. Gavriel Solomon said that the loyalty oath resembles Nuremberg Laws. Supporters of the amendment state that non-Jews who become citizens need to fully appreciate that the "State of Israel is the national expression of the self-determination of the Jewish people."

Israel prohibits its citizens from visiting enemy nations without permission, a travel restriction which, in 2015, included Syria, Iraq, Iran, Lebanon, Yemen, and Saudi Arabia. The Adalah Legal Center claims this disproportionately discriminates against Arab-Israeli citizens, and that authorities did not detain Jewish Israelis upon return from trips to unauthorized countries as they did with Arab Israelis. The Israel Airports Authority has also been criticised for racial profiling of Arab citizens. The Adalah Legal Center maintains a list of more than 50 laws it claims discriminate against Arab citizens. In 2015, there was racial profiling of Arab citizens by security services and other citizens, as well as revenge attacks against Arabs.

Since the outbreak of the Gaza war, Israel has carried out mass arrests and detentions of Palestinians and Arab Israelis, with thousands arrested or detained in Israel and the occupied Palestinian territories. On 5 November 2023, CNN reported that "dozens" of Palestinian residents and Arab citizens of Israel were arrested in Israel for expressions of solidarity with the civilian population of Gaza, sharing Quran verses, or expressing "any support for the Palestinian people". Haaretz described the widespread targeting of Arab Israelis by Israeli security forces. Referring to "hundreds" of interrogations, El País reported on 11 November that Israel increasingly treats its Arab minority as a "potential fifth column".

==== Affirmative action ====
According to section 15 of the States Civil Service [appointments], Arab-Israeli citizens are entitled to affirmative action in civil service employment. Arab-Israeli citizens are entitled to affirmative action in university and college admission requirements, and are entitled to full tuition scholarships by the state.

=== Illegal immigrants and asylum seekers ===
Israel is a state party to the Convention Relating to the Status of Refugees. Israeli human rights organizations consider the Israeli asylum system to be extremely flawed and unfair, and the recognition rate of refugees is considerably lower than 1%. Since 2003, an estimated 70,000 illegal immigrants from various African countries have crossed into Israel. Some 600 refugees from the Darfur region of Sudan have been granted temporary resident status to be renewed every year, though not official refugee status. Another 2,000 refugees from the conflict between Eritrea and Ethiopia have been granted temporary resident status on humanitarian grounds, though Israel prefers not to recognize them as refugees.

In a 2012 news story, Reuters reported, "Israel may jail illegal immigrants for up to three years under a law put into effect on Sunday, an Interior Ministry official said, a measure aimed at stemming the flow of Africans entering Israel across the porous desert border with Egypt." Interior Minister Eli Yishai said, "Why should we provide them with jobs? I'm sick of the bleeding hearts, including politicians. Jobs would settle them here, they'll make babies, and that offer will only result in hundreds of thousands more coming over here." Liel Leibovitz in Tablet Magazine wrote: "If Israel honored the 1951 Refugee Convention it itself signed, it would not deny asylum to the 19,000 African refugees, mostly from Sudan and Congo, fleeing genocide and persecution, making the Jewish state the least inclined country in the Western world to aid those fleeing genocide."

Under the 2014 Prevention of Infiltration Law, all irregular border-crossers are defined as "infiltrators" and may be detained at Saharonim Prison for three months "for the purpose of identification" and then 12 months at the remote Holhot facility. The Hotline for Refugees and Migrants reported that authorities have returned more than half of Holot detainees to Saharonim for up to several months for various rule infractions. In a series of rulings, the Supreme Court rejected that migrants could be held indefinitely and ordered the release of 1,178 Eritrean and Sudanese migrants held for more than a year without charges. The government barred these asylum-seekers from Tel Aviv or Eilat, where they would have had supportive communities and access to social services.

According to the 2015 US Department of State's Country Report on Human Rights Practices, since 2011 the environment for refugees in Israel has deteriorated "due to adoption of policies and legislation aimed at deterring future asylum seekers by making life difficult for those already in the country. These actions further curtailed the rights of the population and encouraged the departure of those already in the country." The government would make it difficult to apply for refugee status while held in detention for a year, and once released would require applicants to provide justification for not applying earlier. Asylum seekers are called "infiltrators" by the government and media, who associate them with increases in crime, disease, and vagrancy.

=== African citizens of Israel ===
According to BBC, Ethiopian Jews living in Israel have long complained of discrimination. They held rallies after an agreement by landlords in southern Israel to not rent or sell their real estate to Jews of Ethiopian origin. The Ethiopian Jewish community took part in demonstrations after a video emerged showing two policemen beating a uniformed Ethiopian-Israeli soldier, Demas Fekadeh. While the protest by thousands of demonstrators was initially nonviolent, clashes with police developed. ACRI claimed that police failed to warn protesters prior to using crowd-dispersal measures, and that their use did not escalate gradually. The government dropped charges against Fekadeh, concluding he had not initiated the altercation that led to his beating.

== Education ==
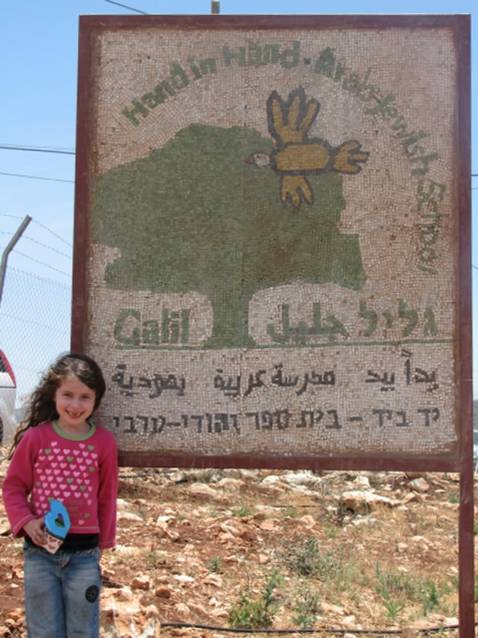
Sign in front of the Galil school, a joint Arab-Jewish primary school in Israel.

Israel's Pupils' Rights Law of 2000 prohibits discrimination of students for sectarian reasons in admission to or expulsion from an educational institution, in establishment of separate educational curricula or holding of separate classes in the same educational institution, and in rights and obligations of pupils. This law has been enforced by the Supreme Court of Israel, prompting protests from Orthodox families who objected to sending their children to integrated schools.

An August 2009 study published in Megamot by Sorel Cahan of Hebrew University's School of Education demonstrated that the Israeli Education Ministry's budget for special assistance to students from low socioeconomic backgrounds severely discriminated against Arabs. It also showed that the average per-student allocation at Arab junior high schools was one-fifth the average at Jewish ones. This was the result of the allocation method used – assistance funds were first divided between Arab and Jewish school systems, according to the number of students in each, and then allocated to needy students; however, due to the largest proportion of such students in the Arab system, they received less funds, per student, than Jewish students. The Ministry of Education said that it had already decided to discontinue this allotment method in favor of a uniform index method, without first dividing the funds between the school systems.

University students by degree, field of study, and population group
Degree	Engineering and architecture		Sciences and mathematics		Medicine		Law	
Degree	Jews %	Arabs %	Jews %	Arabs %	Jews %	Arabs %	Jews %	Arabs %
First degree	90.0%	6.0%	85.3%	9.5%	79.3%	19.7%	92.4%	6.7%
Second degree	91.6%	3.1%	92.9%	3.3%	86.6%	12.3%	94.8%	4.7%
Third degree	91.7%	2.5%	95.1%	2.1%	93.1%	4.1%	96.9%	3.1%

Ministry data on what percentage of high school students pass their matriculation exams, broken down by town, showed that most Arab towns were the lowest ranked – an exception was Arab Fureidis which had the third-highest pass rate (75.86 percent) in Israel.

As of 2007, Arabs account for 1.2% of all tenured or tenure-track academics in Israeli universities. On average, these academics salaries are 50% that of their Jewish counterparts. Until 2008, no Arab women had held a position as a professor in an Israeli university.

=== Affirmative action ===
Israeli citizens who are Arabs, Blacks or people with disabilities are entitled to affirmative action in university and college admission requirements, and are entitled for full tuition scholarships by the state.

=== Education for prisoners ===
Prisoners with good behavior are allowed to take online courses from the Open University of Israel, and to complete academic degrees. The program for education in jail is free for the prisoners, with prison authorities paying their university tuition.

== Migrant workers ==
In 2010, the US Department of State issued a report which stated that "the Government of Israel does not fully comply with the minimum standards for the elimination of trafficking however it is making significant efforts to do so." It noted that Israel continued law enforcement actions against human trafficking, and established a shelter for labor traffic victims. However, the government did not identify the victims, and law enforcement and protection efforts diminished since transferring anti-trafficking duties from Immigration police to the Ministry of Interior.

The 2015 US Department of State report stated that some foreign workers experienced conditions of forced labour, including "the unlawful withholding of passports, restrictions on freedom of movement, limited ability to change or otherwise choose employers, nonpayment of wages, exceedingly long working hours, threats, sexual assault, and physical intimidation." The most vulnerable were foreign agricultural workers, construction workers, and nursing care workers (particularly women).

== People with disabilities ==
Israel has ratified the Convention on the Rights of Persons with Disabilities.

Israel enacted an Equal Rights for People with Disabilities Law in 1998. Nevertheless, the US Department of State report on Israel stated that "de facto discrimination against persons with disabilities" exists in Israel. In 2014, there were approximately 1.6 million people with disabilities residing in Israel. Approximately 878,000 were between the ages of 20 and 64, and 488,000 were over the age of 64. A survey by the Dialog Institute showed that a significant portion of the Israeli population has difficulty accepting people with disabilities as neighbors, co-workers or classmates. 40% of those surveyed said they would "be bothered" if their children were in school with a disabled child, and almost a third of respondents said they would "be bothered" living in the same neighborhood as disabled people.

In Israel more than 144,000 people with disabilities rely solely on government allowances as their only means of support. According to Arie Zudkevitch and fellow members of the Israeli Organization of the Disabled: "The amount of money that we get cannot fulfill even the basic needs of people without special needs." In Tel Aviv, more than 10,000 people marched in solidarity with the disabled, demanding increased compensation and recognition from the Israeli Government.

A 2005 report from the Association for Civil Rights in Israel stated that private psychiatric hospitals were holding 70 individuals who no longer needed hospitalization, but continue to be hospitalized to serve the institutions' financial interests. The most recent statistics of the Israeli Health Ministry showed over 18,000 admissions for psychiatric hospital care.

Beginning in 2014, employers of more than 100 persons were required to have 3 percent of their workforce be persons with disabilities, though enforcement of this quota was limited. Disabled persons have lower rates of employment, and often work part-time for low wages. The advocacy organization Bizchut stated that Arab citizens with disabilities were employed at half the rate of Jews with disabilities, and that shortages of funding for Arab municipalities adversely affected the disabled of these communities.

=== Affirmative action ===
According to section 15 of the States Civil Service [appointments], Israeli citizens with disabilities are entitled to affirmative action in civil service employment. Israeli citizens with disabilities are entitled to affirmative action in university and college admission requirements, and are entitled to full tuition scholarships by the state.

== Human trafficking ==
Israel has been criticized in the 1990s for its policies and its weak enforcement of laws on human trafficking. Women from the former Soviet Republics were brought into the country by criminal elements for forced labor in the sex industry. In 1998, the Jerusalem Post estimated that pimps engaging in this activity derived on average US$50,000–100,000 per prostitute, resulting in a countrywide industry of nearly $450,000,000 annually. By July 2000, Israel passed the Prohibition on Trafficking Law. In its 2003 report, the Human Rights Committee noted it "welcomes the measures taken by the State party to combat trafficking in women for the purpose of prostitution". The 2005 US Department of State report on Israel mentioned "societal violence and discrimination against women and trafficking in and abuse of women."

In October 2006, the Knesset passed a new law outlawing human trade with sentences for human trade offenses of up to 16 years, and 20 years when the victim is a minor. The law also addresses forced labor, slavery, organ theft, and prostitution. The bill also requires compensation of victims of human trade and slavery. Trials will be able to be held behind closed doors to protect the identity of victims. By November, prostitution activity in Israel has become less apparent. Police raided the places that offered sex services, and detained criminals related to prostitution and sex trafficking. However, campaigners say that police action has shifted the industry to private apartments and escort agencies, making the practice more difficult to detect.

== Privatization and human rights ==
The 2005 annual report of the Association for Civil Rights in Israel (ACRI) found that "accelerated privatization" is damaging human rights. According to the report, "State economic policy, including cutting stipends, reducing housing assistance, and constantly declining state participation in health-care and education costs, are forcing more elderly, children and whole families into poverty and despair. The increasing damage to citizens' rights to earn a dignified living – both due to low wages and the lack of enforcement of labor laws – is particularly prominent."

On 7 March 2022, Israeli authorities detained Salah Hamouri, a French-Palestinian human rights worker. He worked with Palestinian prisoner rights group Addameer, which Israeli authorities outlawed. Hamouri was held in administrative detention without trial or charge, based on secret evidence.

== Human rights in the occupied territories ==
=== Israeli Military Governorate ===
Since 1967, Israel had controlled territories captured from Egypt, Jordan and Syria during the Six-Day War. Residents of the Golan Heights are entitled to citizenship, voting rights and residency that allows them to travel within Israel's borders. Israel no longer maintains a permanent occupation force in the Gaza Strip, but has invaded it many times since 2005. The Gaza strip has also been subjected to blockades and other measures Israel deems necessary to its security. The government of Israel has declared that it observes the international humanitarian laws contained in the Fourth Geneva Convention in the occupied territories. Israel denies that the International Covenant on Civil and Political Rights and the International Covenant on Economic, Social and Cultural Rights, both of which it has signed, are applicable to the occupied Palestinian territory.

=== Areas A and B ===
Since the transfer of responsibilities to the Palestinians under the Oslo Accords, Israel says it cannot be held internationally accountable for human rights in these areas.

During the Al-Aqsa Intifada, the UN Commission on Human Rights (UNCHR) reported "widespread, systematic and gross violations of human rights perpetrated by the Israeli occupying power, in particular mass killings and collective punishments, such as demolition of houses and closure of the Palestinian territories, measures which constitute war crimes, flagrant violations of international humanitarian law and crimes against humanity."

The International Court of Justice (ICJ) stated that human rights covenants are applicable and that Israel had breached its obligations under international law by establishing settlements in the occupied territories. According to the ICJ, Israel cannot rely on the right of self-defense or on a state of necessity, and is guilty of violating basic human rights by impeding liberty of movement and the right to work, to health, to education and to an adequate standard of living.

==== Persecution of human rights activists ====
Abdallah Abu Rahmah was arrested by the Israeli army in 2009 for participating in demonstrations which take place weekly in the West Bank. On 25 August 2010, the Israeli military court found Abu Rahmah guilty of two anti-free speech articles in military legislation: "incitement, and organizing and participating in illegal demonstrations". European Union High Representative Catherine Ashton condemned the verdict, stating, "The EU considers Abdallah Abu Rahmah to be a human rights defender committed to non-violent protest against the route of the Israeli separation barrier through his West Bank village of Bil'in."

==== Economic development ====
According to Amnesty International report published on 27 October 2009, Israeli restrictions prevent Palestinians from receiving enough water in the West Bank and Gaza Strip. The report says Israel's daily water consumption per capita was four times higher than that in the Palestinian territories.

=== Settlements and settler violence ===
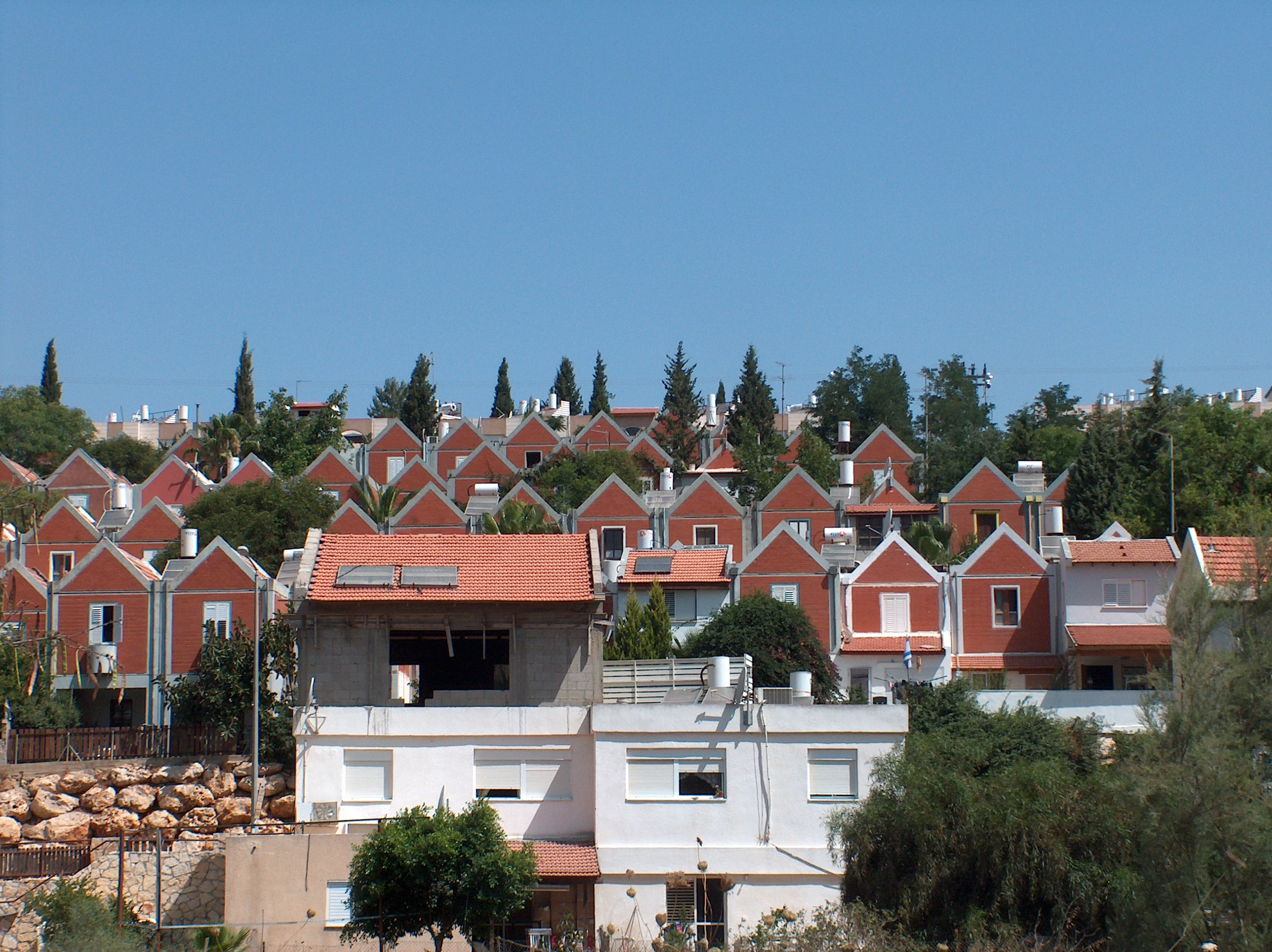
A neighbourhood in the settlement Ariel

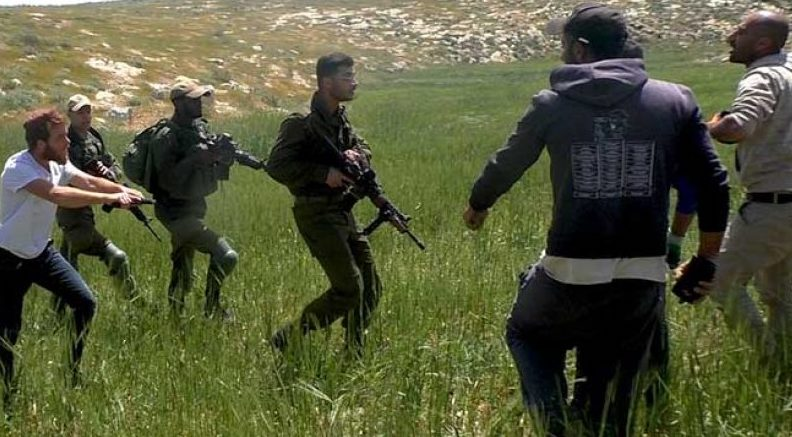
Armed Israeli settler accompanied by soldiers threatens Palestinian farmers near a-Tuwani, South Hebron Hills

Settlements in the West Bank are built on land which has been claimed, for example, by issuing military orders on the basis of security, declaring the area "state land" or a "nature reserve". Human rights organizations such as B'Tselem report that land is also taken by unofficial means, through attacks on Palestinians in their property. B'Tselem reports that the "state fully supports and assists these acts of violence, and its agents sometimes participate in them directly. As such, settler violence is a form of government policy, aided and abetted by official state authorities with their active participation."

Article 3 of the International Convention on the Elimination of All Forms of Racial Discrimination says "States Parties particularly condemn racial segregation and apartheid and undertake to prevent, prohibit and eradicate all practices of this nature in territories under their jurisdiction." A review of Israel's country report by the experts of the Committee on the Elimination of Racial Discrimination took issue with the establishment of Jewish-only settlements and stated "The status of the settlements was clearly inconsistent with Article 3 of the Convention which, as noted in the Committee's General Recommendation XIX, prohibited all forms of racial segregation in all countries. There was a consensus among publicists that the prohibition of racial discrimination, irrespective of territories, was an imperative norm of international law.

On 7 April 2005, the United Nations Committee on Human Rights stated it was "deeply concerned at the suffering of the Syrian citizens in the occupied Syrian Golan due to the violation of their fundamental and human rights since the Israeli military occupation of 1967...[and] in this connection, deploring the Israeli settlement in the occupied Arab territories, including in the occupied Syrian Golan, and regretting Israel's constant refusal to cooperate with and to receive the Special Committee".

Israeli military strategists defend the occupation of the Golan Heights as necessary to maintain a buffer against future military attacks from Syria. The land was captured in the Six-Day War.

=== Israeli apartheid ===
Amnesty International, Human Rights Watch, and B'Tselem have all issued statements describing Israel as committing the crime of apartheid against Palestinians in Israeli-occupied Palestinian territories. B'Tselem, for example, asserts that the military occupation of the West Bank and Gaza has not ended, and that this occupation is not temporary, as it has existed for over 50 years. B'Tselem goes on to describe Israeli policies as advancing and perpetuating the supremacy of one group over another. They describe this situation as an apartheid regime. In 2024 the International Court of Justice in an advisory opinion found that Israel's occupation of the Palestinian territories is in breach of Article 3 of the International Convention on the Elimination of All Forms of Racial Discrimination, including "racial segregation and apartheid". The opinion also identifies possible obligations for third states in regard to certain identified violations.

Israeli treatment of non-Israelis in territories occupied by Israel, for the past forty years, has been compared to South Africa's treatment of non-whites during the apartheid era – by various parties including the Congress of South African Trade Unions, Jimmy Carter, archbishop Desmond Tutu, and Israel Attorney-General Michael Ben-Yair. In 2009, South Africa's Human Sciences Research Council released a 300-page study that concluded that Israel practiced colonialism and apartheid in the Occupied Palestinian Territories.

The term apartheid in the context of the West Bank is used in relation to certain Israeli policies in force in the area. These include segregated roads and settlements, and restrictions placed on movements of Palestinians but not Israelis – in the form of checkpoints and segmentation of the West Bank. The comparison also extends to access to natural resources such as water and access to the judicial system.

Those who criticize the analogy argue that Israeli policies have little or no comparison to apartheid South Africa, and that the motivation and historical context of Israel's policies are different. It is argued that Israel itself is a democratic and pluralist state, while the West Bank and Gaza are not part of sovereign Israel and cannot be compared to the internal policies of apartheid South Africa. According to Gerald Steinberg, the attempt to label Israel an apartheid state is "the embodiment of the new antisemitism that seeks to deny the Jewish people the right of equality and self-determination." Others say that it is "a foolish and unfair comparison", that Arab citizens of Israel have the same rights as other Israeli citizens and that "full social and political equality of all [Israel's] citizens, without distinction of race, creed or sex" is specifically guaranteed by Israeli law. Arab-Israeli journalist Khaled Abu Toameh says, "Fortunately, Arab citizens can go to the same beaches, restaurants and shopping malls as Jews in this 'apartheid' state. Moreover, they can run in any election and even have a minister in the government (Ghaleb Majadlah) for the first time". Others state that the comparison to apartheid is defamatory and inflammatory, and reflects a double standard when applied to Israel since it does not comment on the human and civil rights in neighboring Arab countries or within the Palestinian territories.

=== Israeli West Bank barrier ===
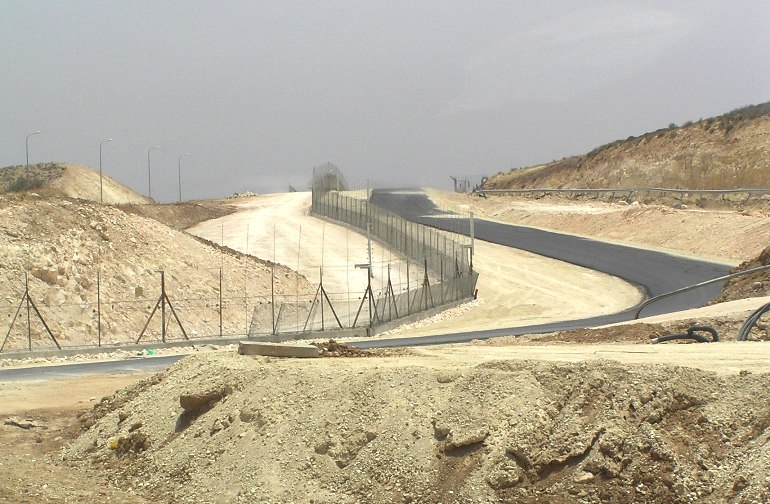
Israeli West Bank barrier

The center of much controversy, the Israeli West Bank barrier is a physical barrier, consisting mainly of fences and trenches, built by the Israeli Government. It is located partly within the West Bank, and partly along the border between the West Bank and Israel proper.

In 2003, the barrier was condemned by a UN Resolution "overwhelmingly" passed by UN General Assembly which also called for all construction to halt. The building of the barrier inside the west bank was also condemned by the International Court of Justice which stated: "Israel also has an obligation to put an end to the violation of its international obligations flowing from the construction of the wall in Occupied Palestinian Territories...reparation must, as far as possible, wipe out all the consequences of the illegal act." During 2003, the Israeli Supreme Court ruled, concerning a stretch of the barrier to the north-west of Jerusalem: "The route [of the West Bank barrier] disrupts the delicate balance between the obligation of the military commander to preserve security and his obligation to provide for the needs of the local inhabitants."

Echoing this sentiment, Amnesty International issued a statement in 2005, saying: "Israel built a fence/wall through the West Bank, confining Palestinians in isolated enclaves cut off from their land and essential services in nearby towns and villages."

A UN report released in August 2005 observed that the existence of the barrier "replaced the need for closures: movement within the northern West Bank, for example, is less restrictive where the Barrier has been constructed. Physical obstacles have also been removed in Ramallah and Jerusalem governorates where the Barrier is under construction." The report notes that more freedom of movement in rural areas may ease Palestinian access to hospitals and schools, but also notes that restrictions on movement between urban population centers have not significantly changed.

=== Military and security-related activity ===
Amnesty International has reported accounts of "unlawful killings; extensive and wanton of destruction of property; obstruction of medical assistance and targeting of medical personnel; torture; and the use of Palestinians as human shields", which they describe as war crimes. They further reported accounts of "reckless shooting" and "excessive use of force" by the Israeli military against militants that endangers the lives of civilians.

Amnesty International and B'Tselem both report that Israeli soldiers are rarely punished for human rights violations, and investigations of crimes are rarely carried out. B'Tselem goes as far as to say that there is "no accountability" for Israeli military violations of international humanitarian law. Of the 400 incidents examined by the Military Advocate General's Corps after the 2008-2009 Gaza war, 52 cases were investigated by the Israeli military. Of these 52 cases there war a total of three indictments, the longest of which was for the stealing of a credit card. B'Tselem describes a trend of a lack of accountability and claims that no official Israeli body is capable of conducting independent investigations of suspected violations of international humanitarian law.

In 2014, Amnesty released a report criticizing Israel for excessive and reckless use of force for which Israeli soldiers are not held accountable. Amnesty said characteristics of the violence suggested it was employed as a matter of policy, and that there was evidence some killings amounted to war crimes.

According to Gal Luft, Palestinian militants utilize a tactic of blending among civilian populations which exacerbates civilian casualties in Israeli attacks. According to Luft, biased media coverage of Operation Defensive Shield encouraged militants to use civilians and refugees as "human shields" because they were not held accountable for their actions.

According to the 2010 US State Department Human Rights Report, in 2010, the Military Investigative Police launched 147 investigations with regard to cases of death, violence, and property damage against residents of the West Bank and the Gaza Strip. In these cases the military advocate general filed 10 indictments against 12 soldiers suspected of committing criminal offenses against Palestinians. There were three convictions of four soldiers, no acquittals, closure of three cases by the military advocate general, and seven cases pending as of year's end.

==== Use of human shields ====
In 2013, a report by the UN Committee on the Rights of the Child concluded that Israeli forces had used Palestinian children as human shields in 14 cases between 2010 and 2013. According to the report, almost everyone who had used children as human shields had remained unpunished.

The IDF acknowledged using the "Neighbor Procedure" or the "Early Warning Procedure", in which the IDF would encourage a Palestinian acquaintance of a wanted man to try and convince them to surrender. This practice was criticized by some as using human shields, an allegation the IDF denied, saying that it never forced people into carrying out the "Neighbor Procedure"; and that Palestinians volunteered to prevent excess loss of life. Amnesty International and Human Rights Watch are among the groups who made the human shield comparison. The Israeli group B'Tselem also made the comparison, saying that "for a long period of time following the outbreak of the second intifada Operation Defensive Shield, in April 2002, the IDF systematically used Palestinian civilians as human shields, forcing them to carry out military actions which threatened their lives". The Neighbor Procedure was outlawed by the Supreme Court of Israel in 2005 but some groups say the IDF continues to use it, although they say the number of instances has dropped sharply.

In April 2004, human rights activists from Rabbis for Human Rights reported that Israeli soldiers used 13-year-old Muhammed Badwan as a human shield during a demonstration in the West Bank village of Biddu, by tying him to the front windscreen of their jeep with the purpose, according to the boy's father, of discouraging Palestinian demonstrators from throwing stones at them. On 1 July 2009, Amnesty International stated that Israeli troops forced Palestinians to stay in one room of their home while turning the rest of the house into a base and sniper position, "effectively using the families, both adults and children, as human shields and putting them at risk," the group said. "Intentionally using civilians to shield a military objective, often referred to as using 'human shields' is a war crime," Amnesty said. Such actions are condemned by human rights groups as violations of the Fourth Geneva Convention.

==== Targeted killing ====
Israel has a policy of targeted killings against those it considers proven to have intentions of performing a specific act of terrorism in the very near future or to be linked with several acts of terrorism. In 2006, the Supreme Court of Israel issued its judgment in The Public Committee against Torture in Israel v. The Government of Israel. The case addressed the issue of whether the state acts illegally in its policy of targeted killings. The court considered that the legal context is a conflict "of an international character (international armed conflict). Therefore, the law that applies to the armed conflict between Israel and the terrorist organizations is the international law of armed conflicts." The court decided that "members of the terrorist organizations are not combatants [...] They do not fulfill the conditions for combatants under international law" and that "they do not comply with the international laws of war." They concluded that "members of terrorist organizations have the status of civilians" but that "the protection accorded by international law to civilians does not apply at the time during which civilians take direct part in hostilities." They ruled that they could not determine whether targeted killings are always legal or always illegal, but the legality must be established on a case-by-case basis. Their ruling stated "it cannot be determined in advance that every targeted killing is prohibited according to customary international law, just as it cannot be determined in advance that every targeted killing is permissible according to customary international law. The law of targeted killing is determined in the customary international law, and the legality of each individual such act must be determined in light of it." The judgment included guidelines for permissible and impermissible actions involving targeted killings and provided the conditions for investigating the criminality of some of the actions.

Palestinian militants have planned multiple attacks against Israeli civilians such as suicide bombings while living among non-militant Palestinian civilians, and thwarting such attacks may have saved lives. The Israeli army maintains that it pursues such military operations to prevent imminent attacks when it has no discernible means of making an arrest or foiling such attacks by other methods. This practice is in accordance with the Fourth Geneva Convention (Part 3, Article 1, Section 28) which reads: "The presence of a protected person may not be used to render certain points or areas immune from military operations." According to John Podhoretz, there may be circumstances when international law gives Israel the right to conduct military operations against militant targets hiding within civilians.

For example, in July 2002 the Israeli Defense Forces carried out an air strike targeting Salah Shahade, the commander of Izz ad-Din al-Qassam Brigades, the military wing of Hamas, in a densely populated residential area of Gaza City. The night-time bombing resulted in the deaths of 15 persons, nine of whom were children, and the injury of 150 others. According to the Israeli government, Shehade was responsible for the deaths of hundreds of Israeli civilians, and earlier Israel asked the Palestinian Authority to arrest him but no action was taken. Israel maintains that Shehade was in the process of preparing another large-scale attack inside Israel and thereby constituted a "ticking bomb".

On 1 March 2009, The Independent obtained an account which, for the first time, details service in one of the Israeli military's assassination squads. A former IDF soldier of an assassination squad described his role in a botched ambush that killed two Palestinian bystanders and two militants. According to the interviewer "the source cannot be identified by name, not least because by finally deciding to talk about what happened, he could theoretically be charged abroad for his direct role in an assassination of the sort most Western countries regard as a grave breach of international law."

==== Blockades ====
According to Amnesty International: "Military checkpoints and blockades around Palestinian towns and villages hindered or prevented access to work, education and medical facilities and other crucial services. Restrictions on the movement of Palestinians remained the key cause of high rates of unemployment and poverty. More than half of the Palestinian population lived below the poverty line, with increasing numbers suffering from malnutrition and other health problems."

In August 2009, UN Human Rights Chief Navi Pillay criticised Israel for blockading the Gaza Strip in a 34-page report, calling it a violation of the rules of war. In September 2009, the UN found in the Goldstone Report that the blockade of Gaza amounted to collective punishment and was thus illegal.

=== 2006 Lebanon War ===
Human Rights Watch and other organizations have accused Israel of committing war crimes in the 2006 Lebanon war. Israel has rejected those accusations and accused Hezbollah of deliberately firing from civilian areas during the fighting.

=== 2009 Gaza War ===
The UN Fact Finding Mission on the Gaza Conflict published a 575-page report on 15 September 2009, stating it had found that war crimes were committed by both sides involved in the Gaza War.

The report condemns Israel's actions during the conflict for "the application of disproportionate force and the causing of great damage and destruction to civilian property and infrastructure, and suffering to civilian populations". It came to the conclusion "that there was strong evidence to establish that numerous serious violations of international law, both humanitarian law and human rights law, were committed by Israel during the military operations in Gaza". The report claims that Israel made disproportionate or excessive use of white phosphorus. Israel has also come under fire from other fact-finding missions over the use of white phosphorus – an incendiary weapon which is deemed illegal to use against civilians (forbidden by the Geneva Conventions) or in civilian areas by Convention on Certain Conventional Weapons – and depleted uranium during the conflict.

The UN report also condemned the use of indiscriminate rocket attacks by Palestinian militants which targeted known civilian areas within Israel, stating that "[t]here's no question that the firing of rockets and mortars [by armed groups from Gaza] was deliberate and calculated to cause loss of life and injury to civilians and damage to civilian structures. The mission found that these actions also amount to serious war crimes and also possibly crimes against humanity".

According to the 2010 US Department of State's Human Rights Report, Israeli Defense Forces (IDF) Military Advocate General Mandelblit investigated all allegations relating to the 2008–09 Operation Cast Lead military incursion into the Gaza Strip, examining over 150 incidents, including those contained in the UN Human Rights Council's 2009 Goldstone report. In January and July, Mandelblit released updates on the majority of investigations, which included details of indictments against several soldiers for manslaughter, improper use of civilians in wartime, and misconduct. As of July 2010, the military advocate general launched 47 military police criminal investigations into IDF conduct during Operation Cast Lead and completed a significant number of them. On 1 August, the IDF issued a new order appointing humanitarian affairs officers to each battalion to provide further protections for civilian populations during wartime planning and combat operations.

=== 2023: Gaza war ===
On 7 October 2023, Hamas launched a major attack on Israel from the Gaza Strip, killing 1,195 people and taking 251 hostages. On 9 October 2023, Israel declared war on Hamas and imposed a "total blockade" of the Gaza Strip. As a result, Gaza is undergoing a severe humanitarian crisis. As of 29 July 2025, over 60,000 Palestinians have been killed, of which over 18,000 were children.

== Government attitude toward NGOs and activists ==
According to the US State Department's 2015 Country Report on Human Rights Practices, Israeli officials were generally cooperative with the United Nations and human rights groups and invited the testimony of human rights NGOs at Knesset hearings. These groups can directly petition the Israeli Supreme Court on government policies and individual cases. In contrast, Israeli human rights organization B'Tselem no longer files reports of violations of international human rights with the Israeli government, since it has deemed that no official Israeli body is willing or capable of conducting investigations.

=== Government attacks on funding and staffing ===
Israeli and Palestinian NGOs claim the Israeli government took measures to prevent them receiving foreign funding. This has been labeled by critics as "McCarthyist."

In July 2015, Deputy Foreign Minister Tzipi Hotovely accused European governments of funding Israeli and Palestinian NGOs which sought to "delegitimize Israel under the guise of human rights", naming leading Israeli human rights organizations B'Tselem, Breaking the Silence, and the Adalah Legal Center. Hotovely threatened that her government would restrict or tax foreign funding of Israeli NGOs if this continued.

The participation of ACRI and B'Tselem in the national service volunteer program was terminated by the civil service in 2015, following government allegations that they engaged in defamation and incitement against Israeli soldiers.

The Ministry of the Interior has refused to renew work permits as well as blocking entry to Israel by foreigners suspected of supporting the Boycott, Divestment and Sanctions campaign against Israel, a policy which applies also to activists.

The government proposed a law that would slap an 80% tax on contributions from abroad to Israeli civil society organizations, according to a B'Tselem report.

=== Government interference with activities ===
On 19 October 2021, Israel designated six Palestinian human rights organizations—Addameer, Al-Haq, Bisan Center for Research and Development, Defense for Children International-Palestine, the Union of Agricultural Work Committees, and the Union of Palestinian Women's Committees—as terrorist organizations.

A law advanced by the government would criminalize any cooperation with the International Criminal Court (ICC). This law would make it punishable by up to five years in prison for human right organizations to release information suggesting that the government or senior Israeli officials have perpetrated a war crime or a crimes against humanity. Much of the work of B'Tselem’s--documenting and publishing government violence against Palestinian--may thus be prohibited by the legislation the government is trying to enact into law, according to a B'Tselem report.

The government continues a partial suspension of its coordination with UNESCO (the UN Educational, Scientific and Cultural Organization), in effect since 2013. In 2015, Israel blocked the UNHRC's special rapporteur (investigator) from gaining access to the West Bank.

== See also ==
- Association for Civil Rights in Israel
- Children in the Israeli–Palestinian conflict
- Emil Grunzweig Human Rights Award
- Gaza Strip famine
- Human Rights Organization of Judea and Samaria
- Human rights in the Palestinian territories
- Human rights violations against Palestinians by Israel
