= Hacohen =

Hacohen is a surname, and is a variant of Cohen, the Hebrew word for "priest". Notable people with the surname include:

- Aviad Hacohen (born 1962), Israeli lawyer and legal scholar
- David Hacohen (1898–1984), Israeli politician
- Menachem Hacohen (1932–2025), Israeli rabbi, writer and politician
- Moshe Hacohen (1874–1950), Tunisian rabbi
- Orit Farkash-Hacohen (born 1970), Israeli lawyer and politician
- Ran HaCohen (born 1964), Israeli writer and translator
- Shalom Hacohen (1772–1845), Hebrew dramatist and poet
