= Ruth Rasnic =

Israeli activist

- רות רזניק
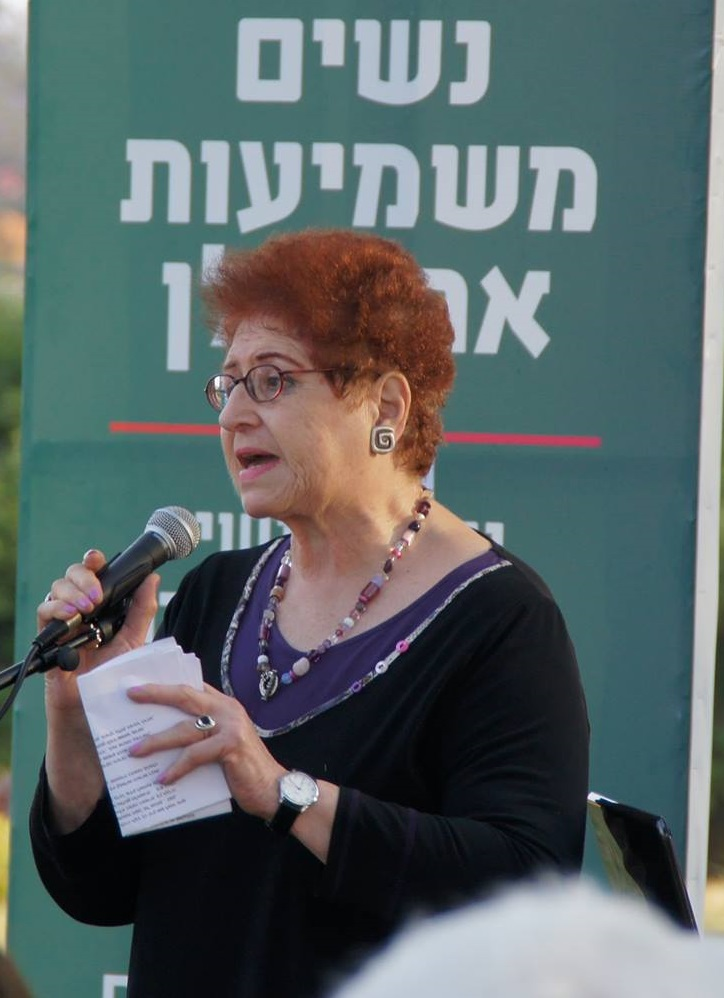
- Ruth Rasnic
- Born: Ruth Lask; 1932 (age 93–94); Jerusalem, Mandatory Palestine
- Occupations: Activist; writer; translator
- Known for: Activism against domestic violence in Israel
- Awards: Israel Prize (2009)

Ruth Rasnic (Hebrew: רות רזניק; born 1932) is an Israeli social and political activist in the struggle against domestic violence in Israel, a writer and a translator. Rasnic won the Israel Prize in 2009.

== Early years ==
Rasnic (née Lask) was born in Jerusalem and spent her childhood there and in Tel Aviv. At the age of 14 she joined the Etzel, and two years later joined a youth settlement group at kibbutz Ruhama. She served in the Israeli Air Force, and later worked at the Israeli embassy in London. She returned to Israel in 1956, after the death of her younger brother in the line of duty.

== Activism ==
In 1977, she established L.O. Combat Violence Against Women, a non-profit organization dedicated to fighting violence against women, of which she was the paid executive director for 34 years, from 1977 to 2011, a year in which she became a volunteer.

Rasnic was one of the founders of the liberal Ratz political party, and served as the party's representative in Na'amat from 1981 to 1996.

In 1986, Rasnic joined the founders of the Israel Women's Network, headed by Prof. Alice Shalvi, as a member and organizer.

== Prizes and awards ==
In 1991 and in 2006, Rasnic was recognized by the Israel Woman's Network.

In 2000, she was chosen to light a torch in the annual ceremony at the Mount Herzl military cemetery, closing Israel's Memorial Day for fallen soldiers.

In 2008, she was appointed by Prime Minister Ehud Olmert to his advisory council for women's stature. In 2009, Rasnic was awarded the Israel Prize for her lifetime achievement & special contribution to society and the State.

== See also ==
- List of Israel Prize recipients
- Women's Spirit
