= Prohibition of Discrimination in Products, Services and Entry into Places of Entertainment and Public Places Law, 2000 =

Israeli law

Prohibition of Discrimination in Products, Services and Entry into Places of Entertainment and Public Places Law is an Israeli law enacted in 2000, which prohibits discrimination on the part of those who provide products, public services or operate public places in providing products, public services, entry to public places or providing services in public places, on the grounds of a customer's race, religion, nationality, land of origin, sex, sexual orientation, political views, personal status or parenthood.

== Background ==
The law originated from an initiative of the Association for Civil Rights in Israel. One of the practices that sped up the enactment of the law, was discrimination frequently practiced by bouncers at nightclub entrances. In addition, setting separate and different age limits for the entrance of men and women into nightclubs was made illegal by this law.

== Exceptions ==
The law does not apply directly to discrimination on the grounds of disability, since accessibility arrangements for disabled persons, and prohibition of discrimination are covered by the Equal Rights for Persons with Disabilities Law.

Other exceptions include:

- When the practice originates from the nature of the product, public service or public place.
- When the practice exists in a non-profit organization or club, and is done in order to promote the special needs of members of the organization or club, on the condition that special needs do not counteract the law's purpose.
- When separate frameworks exist for men and women, and the lack of separation will prevent from part of the public access to product, public service or public place.

Violation of the law is a criminal offense, and an offender can be ordered to pay compensation to victims of discrimination, even without proof of damages. Class action lawsuits are allowed under the law.

== See also ==
- Human rights in Israel
