= Dvora Hacohen =

Israeli historian (1937–2026)

- דבורה הכהן
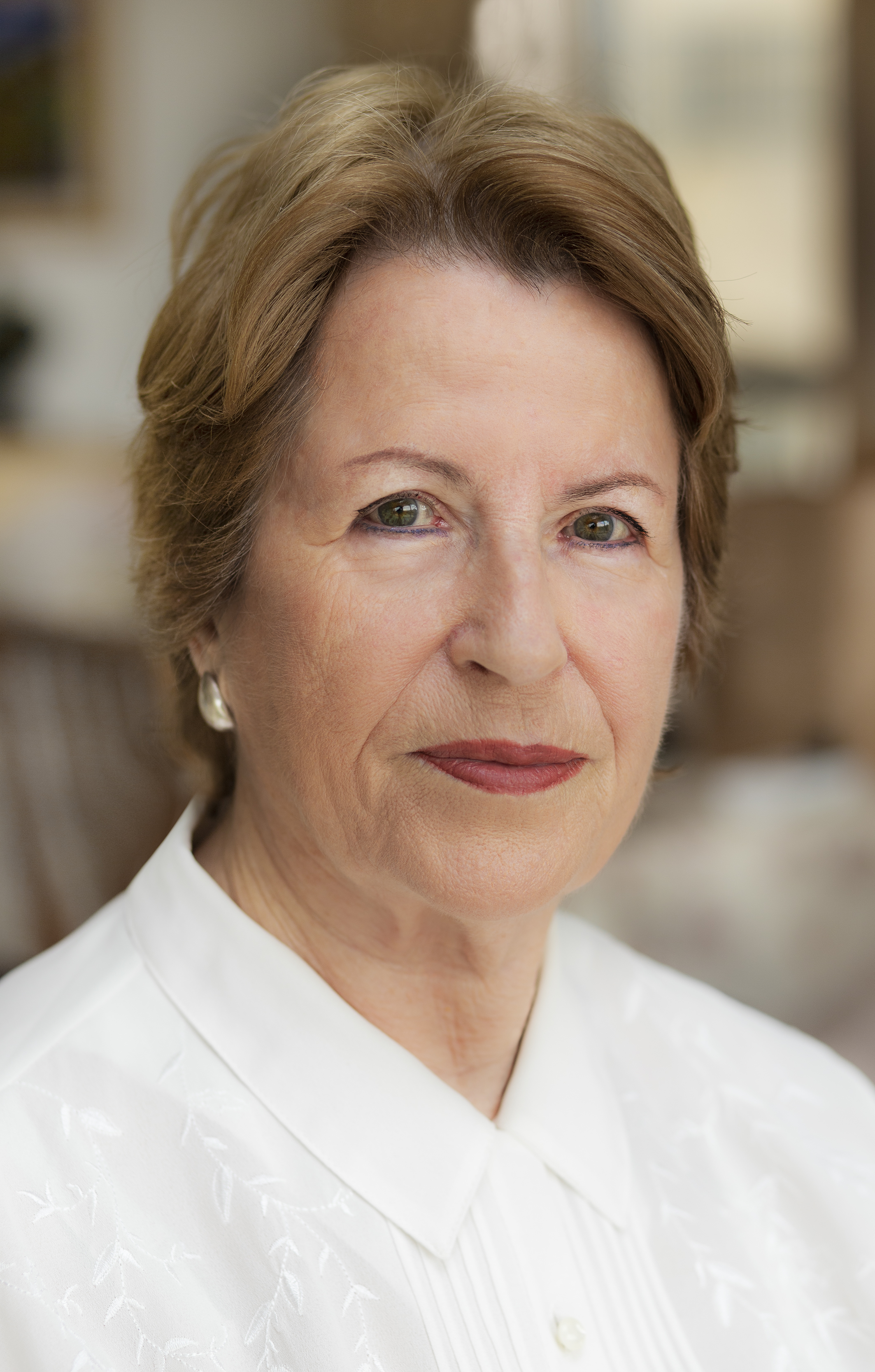
- Born: Dvora Klirs; 7 November 1937; Tiberias, Mandatory Palestine
- Died: November 2026 (aged 89)
- Occupation: Historian
- Employer: Bar-Ilan University
- Spouse: Menachem Hacohen (died 2025)

Dvora Hacohen (Hebrew: דבורה הכהן; née Klirs (קלירס); 7 November 1937 – November 2026) was an Israeli historian and academic who was a professor in the Department of Land of Israel Studies and Archaeology at Bar-Ilan University in Israel. Her research interests were in the development of Israeli society.

== Early life and education ==
Born Dvora Klirs on 7 November 1937, she received a B.Ed. from Efrata College of Education in Jerusalem and a B.A. in history and literature from the Hebrew University of Jerusalem, then an M.A. magna cum laude in Jewish history from Tel Aviv University. She earned her Ph.D. in sociology and anthropology at Bar-Ilan University, Ramat-Gan with a dissertation titled "The great immigration and absorption in Israel in 1948–1953", and pursued post-doctoral studies at Oxford University.

== Career ==
Hacohen was a professor of modern history at Bar-Ilan University. Her central research interest was transformations in social and cultural history, about which relatively little has been written, compared to the emphasis placed on the political aspects of history. She wrote about leaders and their role in the process of social transformations. Her research encompasses the history of the Jewish people and of Palestine in the twentieth century, focusing on the history of Zionism; historical biography; Jewish immigration in the twentieth century; and history of the Yishuv (Jewish community in Mandatory Palestine) and the state of Israel.

Known for her studies on immigration and acculturation, she was called upon by the Minister of Education in Israel to be the academic adviser of the Ministry regarding absorption of the children of immigrants in the great wave of immigration of the 1990s, when nearly one million people immigrated to Israel from the former Soviet Union. Immigration has been one of the most influential elements in the building of the Jewish community in pre-state Palestine, and a major factor in the social and economic development of the State of Israel.

From 1975 to 1992, she was the Scientific Advisor of Educational Television for History and Jewish Studies. From 1987 to 1989, she served as a research fellow at the Ben-Gurion Institute for the Study of Zionism and the State of Israel in Sde Boker, and lecturer in the Department of Jewish History at Ben-Gurion University of the Negev. She also worked as a researcher at Oxford University, Harvard University, and at Hebrew Union College in Cincinnati, and in 2012 taught as a visiting professor at Rutgers University in New Brunswick.

== Personal life and death ==
Hacohen was married to rabbi and Knesset member Menachem Hacohen; Aviad Hacohen, a professor of law, and Miron Hacohen, who serves in the Ministry of Economy, are their sons.

Dvora Hacohen died in November 2026, at the age of 89.

== Awards ==
- 20 January 2021: Jewish Book Council National Jewish Book Awards, Book of the year award for To Repair a Broken World: The Life of Henrietta Szold, Founder of Hadassah.
- 2012. Ben-Zvi Prize for Children of the Time, Youth Aliyah 1933–1945, for research in modern Jewish history.
- 2013. David Ben-Gurion Prize, for research on Israel and contribution to scholarship.
- 2019. The Zalman Shazar Center for research of Jewish history, award for A Leader without Bounds. A Biography of Henrietta Szold (Am Oved, Tel Aviv 2019).
- 2015. Yakir Yerusahlayim (Honorary Citizenship of Jerusalem), for social and cultural involvement.

== Select publications ==
- 2021. To Repair a Broken World. The Life of Henrietta Szold, Founder of Hadassah. Trans. Shmuel Sermoneta-Gertel. Cambridge, Massachusetts: Harvard University Press.
- 2019. Manhigah le-lo gevulot: Henriyeṭah Sold, biyografyah [A Leader without Bounds. Henrietta Szold, a Biography]. Tel Aviv: Am Oved.
- 2011. The Children of the Time: Youth Aliyah, 1933–1948. (Hebrew, Yaldei Hazman). Yad Vashem, The International Institute for Holocaust Research. Jerusalem / The Ben-Gurion Research Institute, Ben Gurion University. Yad Itzhak Ben Zvi, Jerusalem.
- 2003. Immigrants in Turmoil: Mass Immigration to Israel and its Repercussions in the 1950s and After. Syracuse, New York: Syracuse University Press.
- 1998. Hagaryin Ve'Harechaim, Hityashvut Ha'Olim Ba'Negev Ba-Assor Ha'Rishon Lamedinah [The Grain and the Millstone, The Settlement of Immigrants in The Negev in the First Decade of the State]. Tel Aviv: Am-Oved, ISBN 9789651312717.
- 1994. "Klitah Yeshirah", Hakelita Hachevratit Hatarbutit shel Ha'Olim Me'Brit Hamoetzot Vehshlachoteha, 1990–1993 ["Direct Absorption", Socio-Cultural Absorption of Immigrants from Former Soviet Union, 1990–1993]. Jerusalem: The Jerusalem Institute for Israel Studies.
- 1994. Tochnit Ha'Milion, Tochnito shel Ben-Gurion L'aliyah Hamonit, 1942–1945 [From Fantasy to Reality, Ben-Gurion's Plan for Mass Immigration, 1942–1945]. Tel Aviv: Ministry of Defense publishing house.
- 1994. Olim Be'Seharah, Mediniyut Ha-Aliyah Ve-HaKelitata Be'Israel, 1948–1953 [Immigrants in Turmoil, The Great Wave of Immigration to Israel and its Absorption, 1948–1953]. Jerusalem: Yad Izhak Ben-Zvi, ISBN 9789652171146.
- 1980. One People, The Story of the Eastern Jews. (co-author). New York: Funk and Wagnalls.
