= Employment (Equal Opportunities) Law =

Employment (Equal Opportunities) Law is an Israeli law, whose first version was passed in 1988, that prohibits the employer from discriminating between job applicants or employees. As of 2024, after a series of amendments, the discrimination based on the following criteria is prohibited:

- Sex
- Sexual orientation
- Marital status (single, married, divorced, or widowed)
- Pregnancy
- Fertility treatment
- Parenting
- Age
- Race
- Religion
- Nationality
- Country of origin
- Residence
- Political views
- Party affiliation
- Reservist duty

Anything required by the character or substance of the position or job is not to be deemed discriminatory by the law, e.g., not accepting a Muslim person for the position of Chief Rabbi. Prohibition of discrimination applies to hiring, working conditions, promotion, professional training or studies, discharge or severance pay and benefits and payments provided for employees in connection with their retirement from employment. The law was enacted in 1988, and replaced an earlier 1981 law.

The law further provides that, under certain conditions, provisions in an enactment, collective agreement or employment contract made in connection with maternity are not to be considered discriminatory. It also provides that any rights given to working mothers are to be given equally to working fathers, under certain conditions. Protection from sexual harassment is addressed in section 7, which states that an employer shall not "act against" an employee who rejects, or opposes, any act of a sexual nature committed by the employer or by the supervisor of the employee.

Violation of the law constitutes both a civil and criminal offence, and courts may grant compensation even when no material damage was caused. In addition, civil proceedings can be initiated by an employee, an employee organization or civil rights group, with special protection granted to the worker filing the complaint. The Israeli Ministry of Economy (formerly known as the Industry, Trade and Labor Ministry) is responsible for promoting the law.

== See also ==
- Human rights in Israel
