= Haifa Women's Coalition =

Coalition of Israeli women's organizations

- אשה לאשה - מרכז פמיניסטי חיפה
- Formation: 1983
- Headquarters: Haifa, Israel

The Haifa Women's Coalition (Hebrew: אשה לאשה - מרכז פמיניסטי חיפה) is a coalition of four women's organizations in the Israeli city of Haifa: Isha l'Isha – Haifa Feminist Center, Kayan – Feminist Organization, Haifa Rape Crisis Center, and Aswat. The coalition works for women's rights awareness and supports women victims of domestic and sexual violence. Jewish and Arab women in Israel work under one roof, creating a contact point for Northern Israeli women of all backgrounds.

== Overview ==
Isha l'Isha, Aswat, Kayan and the Haifa Rape Crisis Center have gained international recognition. In 2008, Aswat was awarded the Go visible Award of the city of Vienna, an initiative of the Austrian Green Party. Rauda Morcos, then the head of Aswat, was awarded the Felipa de Souza Award of the OutRight Action International in 2006. Aswat was the first public organization for Arab lesbians in the Middle East and Rauda Morcos was for a long time the only openly gay member of Aswat. The group has supporters in Israel, the West Bank and Gaza, but most Arab lesbians hide their sexual preferences for fear of reprisals. The first conference of Aswat in March 2008 was met with a high level of response from supporters but also from opponents of gay rights. Israel's Islamic Movement had requested cancellation of the conference. The organizers refused, and members of the Islamic Movement demonstrated in front of the conference building.

Aswat aims to strengthen cooperation with feminist organizations in the Occupied Palestinian Territories. The women see their struggle for gay rights in connection to the Palestinian struggle against the occupation, and also aim to show solidarity with Palestinian homosexuals in the OPT whose situation is even more difficult than that of Palestinian homosexuals in Israel.

Kayan called public and media attention inter alia with its research about mobility among women in Arab villages and towns in Northern Israel. This first study of the topic showed the complete lack of public transportation in Israel's Arab localities, and convinced the Ministry of Transport to install bus lines in Sakhnin, Arara, Umm el Fahm and other Arab towns and villages. The project "Women Demand Mobility" also involved women's community activism in Mghar and other villages without public transportation, where women installed bus lines out of their own initiative. Israeli media also reported widely about an environmental project where women from Mghar raise environmental awareness among children and youth. Environmental work by women is a novelty in Arab society, empowers women and helps the community at the same time.

Isha l'Isha's achievements for the prevention of trafficking of women are of utmost importance. The organization succeeded in raising public awareness for the problem, including the installation of a parliamentary committee that deals with the issue. Traffickers of women face heavier punishments today thanks to Isha l'Isha's initiative, and Isha l'Isha is regarded a central reference and expert on the topic in Israel.

In July 2000, the Haifa Rape Crisis Center, along with the other nine national rape crisis centers, received the Volunteer Award presented by the President of Israel. The award is in recognition of the Centers' "important pioneering contribution to Israeli Society" and their "contribution to the uprooting of the epidemic of sexual violence from Israeli Society and on the support given to survivors".

== Criticism ==
Especially the quarter policy of the Israeli feminist movement, which is also implemented in the Haifa Women's Coalition, is subject to criticism. The quarter policy aims to ensure equal representation of Israel's large population groups – Mizrahi women (Jews who descend from the Middle East, North Africa, Central Asia and the Caucasus), Ashkenazi women (Jews who descend from European countries), Lesbian and Palestinian women. On the one hand, there are basic discussions about the implementation and usefulness of this policy. On the other hand, it is asked why Russian women, a large minority in Israel today, are not represented. In reaction to this criticism, the quarter system was expanded to accommodate additional groups that make up Israeli society.

The different identities of the women are an ongoing topic of discussion. Women from minority groups often feel dominated by Ashkenazi women and unequally represented. The building of coalitions and the sharing of resources shall provide answers to these questions.

== See also ==
- Human rights in Israel
- Women's Spirit
