= Women's Spirit =

Women's Spirit - Ruach Nashit
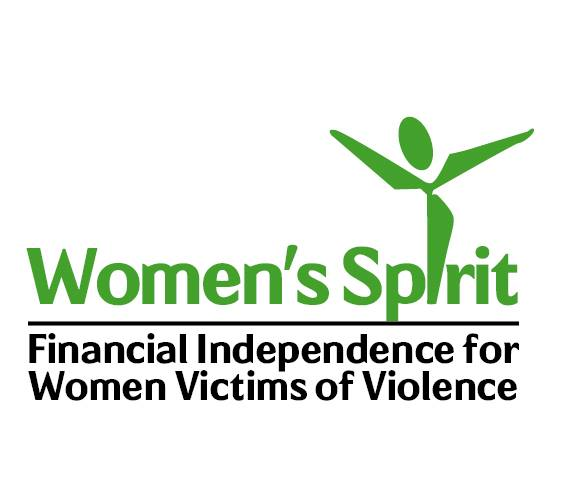
- Founded: 2007
- Founder: Maki Neaman & Dianna Rozner
- Type: Non-profit; NGO
- Purpose: Financial independent, Domestic violence, Violence against women, political rights
- Location: 55 Menachem Begin Street, Tel Aviv, Israel
- Region served: Israel
- Employees: 16
- Volunteers: 400
- Website: www.ruach-nashit.org.il (English)

Women's Spirit: Financial Independence - for Women Victims of Violence is an Israeli Amruta that offers women victims of domestic violence the tools and support with which to become financially independent. The organization seeks to raise awareness of violence against women and provide women with the tools and skills to become personally and financially independent.

== Programs ==
Its programs include group workshops, individual job coaching and mentoring, job placement support and educational programs. Their career forum supports job networking and placement and is involved in fund raising and public relations. The "Friendly Employer" project seeks to encourage cooperation between employers, society. The organization was founded to provide a vehicle for the more than 200,000 Israeli women who are subject to violence each year to create independent, sustainable lives.

Women's Spirit's activities are supported by volunteers, local women's shelters and other aid organizations, municipal authorities and businesses.

== Funding ==
The organization is funded through governmental and private contributions, donations and annual fund raising activities. For instance, The Hadassah Foundation is a supporter.

== Feminist Partnership ==
It is one of seven leading organizations in Israel that have partnered to promote women's rights. The program, entitled "Bringing Women to the Fore: The Feminist Partnership", is coordinated through the Jewish Women's Collaborative International Fund and its objective is to "lead effective change in social perception and public policy, to promote equality and reduce gender gaps in the economic, social and occupational spheres – making Israel a more gender-equal society." Other organizations in the partnership include Adva Center, Itach-Maaki: Women Lawyers for Social Justice, Mahut Center, The Israel Women's Network (IWN), Economic Empowerment for Women (EEW), and Achoti (Sister) for Women in Israel.

== See also ==
- Haifa Women's Coalition
- Human rights in Israel
- Management of domestic violence
