= Israel Fencing Association =

National governing body for fencing in Israel

Israel Fencing Association איגוד הסיוף בישראל
- Sport: Fencing
- Jurisdiction: Israel
- Founded: 1996
- Affiliation: Fédération Internationale d'Escrime
- Regional affiliation: European Fencing Confederation
- Headquarters: Wingate Institute, Israel
- President: Yosef Harari
- CEO: Irina Tal

Official website
- www.fencing.org.il
- (Israel)

The Israel Fencing Association (איגוד הסיוף בישראל) is the national governing body for fencing in Israel.

The Association's headquarters are at Wingate Institute, Israel. It is part of the 45-nation European Fencing Confederation. The CEO of the Association is Shalom Cohen.

== History ==
The Israel Fencing Association was founded in 1996 in Tel Aviv. In 2004, Dr. Vladimir Shklar was the chairman of the association. In May 2013 Shklar was also elected vice president of the Olympic Committee of Israel. In November 2015, he was named president of the European Fencing Confederation. Uri Harlap then replaced Shklar as president of the Israel Fencing Association.

In 2008, Israeli fencer Yuval Freilich, a national under-13 champion, successfully sued the Israel Fencing Association to require it to refrain temporarily from holding fencing competitions on Shabbat (the Jewish sabbath), saying that the Association's actions violated Israel's Equal Opportunities Act. The Israeli Supreme Court ruled that the Fencing Association's practice was discriminatory, and ordered it to either allow Freilich to compete on a different day or hand him technical victories for any Sabbath match. Freilich subsequently won the age group World Cadet Championships in Moscow, and the age group European Championships. But the ruling expired after two years, and did not result in any permanent change. The Israeli Supreme Court declined to intervene a second time.

Jerusalem, Israel, was chosen to host of the European Fencing Confederation's Under-20 Championships in 2013.
