= Nadia Matar =

Israeli activist

- נדיה מטר
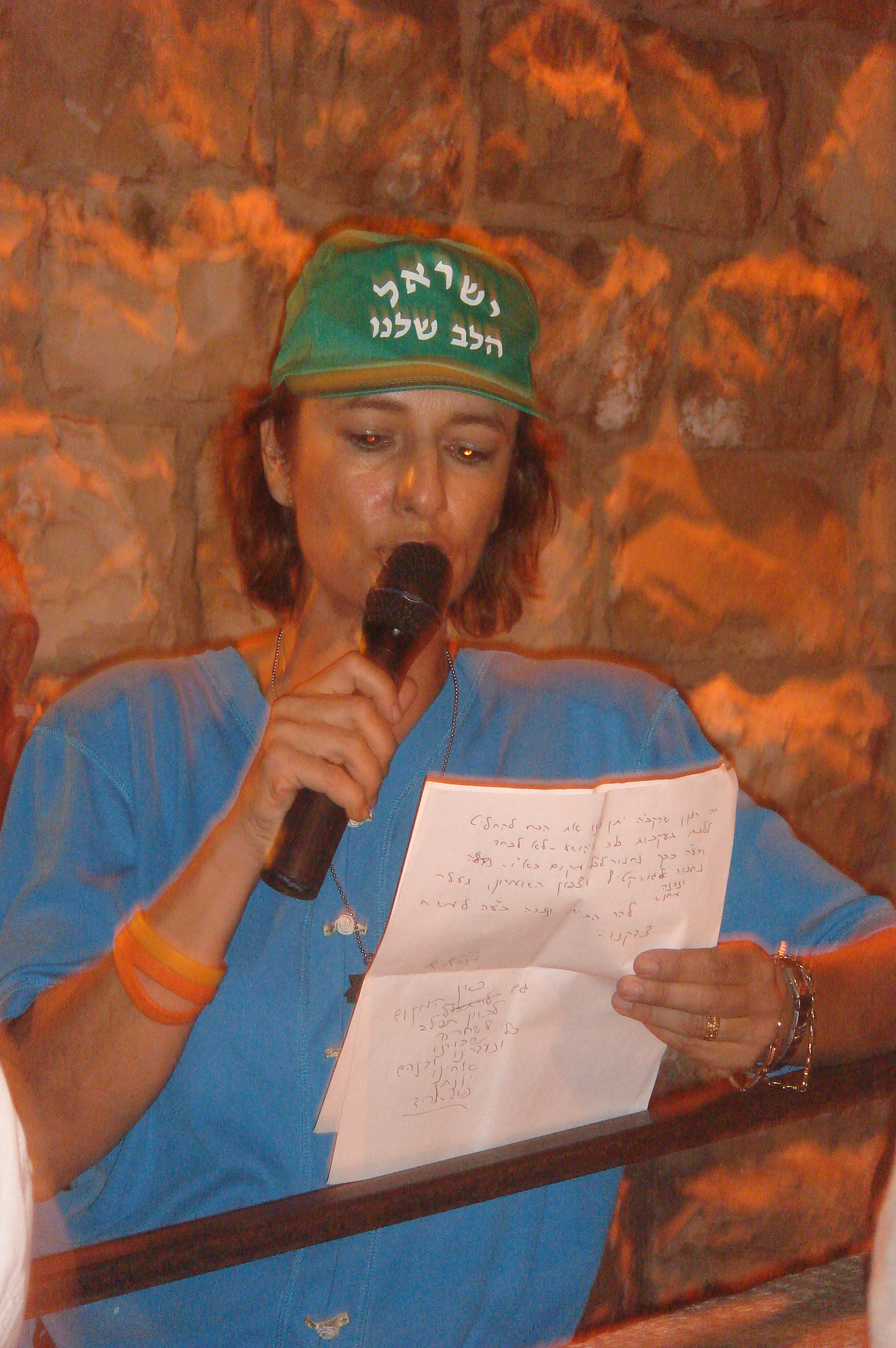
- Nadia Matar
- Born: February 16, 1966; Antwerp, Belgium
- Occupation: Political activist

Nadia Matar (Pikovitch) (Hebrew: נדיה מטר; born February 16, 1966) is an Israeli right-wing activist. She has been called by some admirers "the settlers' Joan of Arc". She is, together with Yehudit Katsover, the co-chairwoman of the right-wing organization Women in Green. She hosts a settler radio show.

== Life ==
Matar was born in 1966 in Antwerp, into a secular Jewish family. A Yavneh Olami youth leader, she performed aliyah (immigrated) alone at the age of 18, in 1984. Matar married an American doctor, David, a pediatrician at Hadassah Hospital, with whom she has six children. They settled in Efrat, moving to Shirat HaYam in Gush Katif in 2004, when Ariel Sharon decided to dismantle Jewish settlements in the Gaza Strip.

== Positions ==
Matar regards the Oslo Peace Accords as a "criminal betrayal of the Jewish people". She lobbied against the Israeli withdrawal from its Gaza Strip settlements, and compared Yonathan Bassi, the official Ariel Sharon appointed to oversee the withdrawal, to the kind of person in a Judenrat under Nazi control who wrote letters telling his community to prepare for deportation (to a death camp). The analogy was rebuffed by Avner Shalev, chairman of Yad Vashem, as "irresponsible, disrespectful, and distorting history". Unification of the land for her means, ultimately, all the land from "the Nile to the Euphrates". In her view, Israel's Peace Treaty with Egypt, and the restitution of the Sinai, was a "tragic mistake".

She took Australian Prime Minister Kevin Rudd to task for backing a UN resolution against Jewish settlement in the West Bank. She warned him that God was on her side, and advised him against forcing settlers to "do something. ... Just for your own sake, because you might be next."

She has set up roadblocks to stop Palestinians travelling in certain areas of the West Bank. Recently, she called Palestinian building on, and use of, the land in the West Bank "agricultural jihad", while arguing for an annexation of the same area, with an extension of equal rights to Palestinians, on condition that they sign a loyalty oath to Israel and serve in the IDF.

She is a leading figure in an apparent attempt to create a settlement, called Shdema, at Ush al-Ghrab ("Crow's Nest") in Beit Sahour, on a local Palestinian park that was, until 2006, an Israeli military base, and where her activism has managed to get the IDF to restore a presence there in the form of a watchtower, and prevent "illegal Arab building".

She regards Tel Aviv as a "baby" (tinoket), compared to the West Bank, and has stated that renouncing Hebron is tantamount to losing one's moral right to Tel Aviv. Palestinians are the real squatters in the "Land of Israel", she argues, and has gone on record as supporting the idea of expelling Israeli Arabs. In an interview with Michael Petrou, she stated:

I'm in favour of having a system in which any major decision for this country is taken by a Jewish majority. If that means giving less rights to the Israel Arabs, then yes. Everyone knows that there is another war coming, and in the war, we'll have to do what we have to do to make it clear to them that this is a Jewish state, whether that means expelling them or buying their land or telling them to go to Canada.

She imagines that the whole Land of Israel, in which she includes the West Bank, lies under an imperative struggle on the ground, throughout every inch of territory, where "(e)nemies from within and without want to take it from us, and we must not continue with our life's routine. The words routine (shigra) and expulsion (geirush) have the same root." When anchorman Liam Bartlett noted that settlement building is illegal, she replied, "Where should we go? Where should we go? Back to Auschwitz?" In the wake both of the murder of 3 Israeli teenagers, and on the discovery that the revenge murder of a Palestinian boy was perpetrated by Israeli youths, she said the response to the former was to build new outposts and settlements in revenge, one of which is named after them, Givat Oz Ve'Gaon.

When somebody hurts you, you want revenge, you want to hurt him. How do you hurt him? When you show them that - with a smile, that you are not going to take us away from our homelands, and we are going to - for every Jew you attack, we're going to build another community.

Asked what she would do were she, a mother of three, in the shoes of a Palestinian mother, she answered that she could not imagine that, since a Palestinian mother is her enemy, adding: "In the law of the jungle, only the strong survive. And we will survive."

== See also ==
- Im Tirtzu
- Central Fund of Israel
