= Jewish Women's Collaborative International Fund =

Jewish Women's Collaborative International Fund (JWCIF) is a non-profit organization that promotes women's rights and gender equality. Its member organizations include Jewish Women's organizations in the United States and Israel.

== Feminist Partnership ==
An unprecedented program entitled "Bringing Women to the Fore: The Feminist Partnership" is coordinated through the Jewish Women's Collaborative International Fund and to "lead effective change in social perception and public policy, to promote equality and reduce gender gaps in the economic, social and occupational spheres – making Israel a more gender-equal society." Organizations to affect change include Adva Center, Women's Spirit, Itach-Maaki: Women Lawyers for Social Justice, Mahut Center, The Israel Women's Network (IWN), Economic Empowerment for Women (EEW), and Achoti (Sister) for Women in Israel.

== Member organizations ==
Fourteen member organizations in the United States and three member organizations in Israel include:

- Boston Jewish Community Women's Fund
- Israel Lions of Judah
- Jewish Women's Foundation of Broward County
- Jewish Women's Foundation of Greater Pittsburgh
- Jewish Women's Foundation of Metropolitan Chicago
- Jewish Women's Foundation of Metropolitan Detroit
- Jewish Women's Foundation of New York
- Jewish Women's Foundation of South Palm Beach County
- Jewish Women's Foundation of the Greater Palm Beaches
- National Council of Jewish Women Israel Granting Program
- The Dafna Fund
- The Hadassah Foundation
- The Netivot and Neshamot Funds of UJA-Federation/Westchester Women's Venture Fund
- Tikkun Olam Women's Foundation of Greater Washington
- Women of Vision – The Jewish Women's Foundation of Greater Philadelphia
- Women's Amutot Initiative of the Greater Miami Jewish Federation
