= Adva Center =

Institute for the Study of Israeli Society

Adva Center is a non-partisan Israeli policy analysis center based in Tel Aviv.

== History ==
Adva (lit. "ripple") was founded in 1991 by activists from three social movements: the movement for equality for Mizrahi Jews, the feminist movement, and the movement for equal rights for Arab citizens. The founding director of the center is Barbara Swirski and its chairman is Yossi Dahan. Since 2025, the executive director of the Adva Center is Dr. Yael Hasson.

== Objectives ==
Adva Center seeks policy changes that favor disadvantaged groups in Israel. This is done by offering consultations for advocacy organizations, Cabinet members and legislators; by organizing coalitions for social change; by testifying at public forums and giving media interviews; and by an extensive popular education program that brings progressive social ideas to a wide variety of audiences, from cleaning workers to senior executives.

Much of this work is done in the framework of the National Budget Analysis Program, under which the draft budget is analyzed annually for its implications for disadvantaged social groups and Israeli society in general; and budget workshops are organized for civil society organizations throughout Israel. Policy analysis is published in various reports and monitors offering annual updates on educational achievements, wages and tax policy.

Adva has an extensive gender democracy program, under which, among others, approximately 30 Economic Literacy courses were conducted in the years 2008-2011 for female paid and elected officials in local governments throughout Israel, as well as for women active in non-profit organizations. In recent years, the thrust of Adva's gender program has been education for civic involvement and for advancing gender fairness in national and local programming and budgeting.

== Strategies ==
The Adva Center carries out its work using the following strategies:

- Publishing information on economic and social policy, and disseminating it to social change organizations, government officials and the general public.
- Articulating alternatives regarding the national budget, as well as education, welfare and housing policy.
- Writing and initiating articles and op-eds on social issues in the written media and promoting coverage of social issues in the electronic media.
- Carrying out direct advocacy with government ministers, executive officials, Knesset committee chairs and Knesset members.
- Organizing conferences to stimulate public debate on issues like Israel's education system and government policy towards Bedouin citizens.
- Building and joining coalitions with relevant non-profit organizations to advocate for specific changes.
- Providing consultations for senior government ministry officials, politicians from the coalition and the opposition and the general public.
- Disseminating ideas for social change through lectures, seminars, workshops and training courses for everyone from senior public officials to students and members of youth movements.
- Conducting courses in socio-economic literacy, how to understand and influence the national budget, and how to mainstream gender into local budgeting - for social activists and women active in their local communities.
- Disseminating information via the Adva Center website in Hebrew, Arabic and English.
- Initiating projects to empower disadvantaged groups.

== Reports ==
=== Social equality ===
The Adva Center publishes a report on social and economic dynamics annually called "Israel: A Social Report". The report presents data in the areas of economic growth, investments, wages, primary and higher education, health care and retirement income. In December 2011, the Adva Center released an updated report by Dr. Shlomo Swirski and Etty Konor-Attias following a summer of unprecedented social justice protests in which almost all the issues raised by Adva over the years were brought into focus. The high level of inequality in Israeli society became a frequent topic of discussion in the Israeli media. The size, income and expenditures of Israel's middle class—first pointed out in an Adva Center report and updated annually—also became the subject of many media items and a concern in the corridors of power.

==== Health care ====
A chapter of the annual Social Report focuses on health care. In the 2011 Social Report, this chapter shows that the gap continued to widen in 2010 between the desirable and actual funding levels for the basket of health services provided by the health maintenance organizations. The burden of out-of-pocket payments for health services and for private health insurance policies doubled over the last decade. The Adva Center works closely with Physicians for Human Rights and with the Association for Civil Rights in Israel, among other organizations, on the public health issue.

==== Employment and social security ====
The annual "Labor Report" monitors labor market developments in Israel, including employees' and employers' share of the national income, salary trends and fringe benefits in different sectors of the economy, high and low salaried persons by gender and ethnic group, the kinds of new jobs being created, unemployment rates and more. Taking their cue from these reports, business sections of print and internet papers have begun to write about the high management fees of retirement savings plans.

===== Retirement savings =====
The Adva Center runs workshops to educate workers on the importance of retirement savings and on the benefits and disadvantages of various alternative plans. It also lobbies officials and the media to advocate for improvements in the retirement savings system. In 2010 it became mandatory for all employed persons in Israel to contribute to retirement savings, as implemented through the payroll system. Retirement savings of between 5% and 7% of gross wage are subtracted from the monthly salary of employees and transferred to their retirement savings accounts. Employers are also mandated to contribute to these accounts at the rate of 6%-13% of gross salary. The retirement savings accounts are owned and managed by insurance companies and investment houses. Management fees are for these accounts are extremely high, eroding as much as 30% of a person's savings. Agents at insurance companies and banks have also been found to aggressively offer advice - for additional fees - which put employees at a loss. Additionally, investment committees without any employee representation place most of the monies in the highly volatile capital market, with no guaranteed minimum annual return.

==== Education ====
Adva has produced a series of policy papers on education reform. Most recently, the August 2011 paper titled "Education Reform: Making Education Work for All Children" argues that the current functioning of the Israeli school system perpetrates inequality and poor achievements among most schoolchildren in a multigenerational trend. The analysis is based on the belief that all Israeli schoolchildren are capable of attaining normative achievements, and that the school system can be changed to enable them to do so. Main tenets of the proposed reform include:

1. Eliminating tracks, or groupings by ability, in all public school classes.
2. Providing support systems in each school for students needing assistance.
3. Ending the suspension and expulsion of students in any way.
4. Teaching Israel's full core curriculum in every school and reaching normative achievement in the core subjects.
5. Fostering a school environment that is open to the historical and cultural narrative of the local community, its language and music, the work world of the parents, the religious patterns of the community, and the norms and mores of its interpersonal and social behavior. This includes revising history and literature courses so that all students can identify themselves, their families, and their communities on the map of Israel – present, past, and future.

==== Israeli–Palestinian conflict ====
The Center releases a semi-annual report called "The Costs of Occupation". The publication provides data on the relationship between the Israeli–Palestinian conflict and Israel's economic growth, its budget, its social development, its vision, its international standing, its army, societal divisions, and its future as a Jewish state. The report has received public attention since it was first published in 2006, prompting other researchers to examine the same phenomenon. The latest report, released in May 2012 and attempts to demonstrate that:

- The Israeli economy is subject to double jeopardy: Israel needs to deal not only with crises stemming from global developments but also with those caused by the conflict. As a result, during the last decade (2001-2011), Israel's economic growth per capita grew more slowly than that of the countries of East Asia and Eastern Europe, and at a rate similar to that of Western countries. The problem is that in order to reach parity with Western countries, Israel needs to grow at a rate similar to those of the emerging economies of Asia and Eastern Europe.
- Due to the potential for instability, Israel's credit rating is low in comparison with the countries it would like to emulate.
- Hostilities cost money: between 1989 and 2011, the Ministry of Defense received budget increments totaling NIS 48 billion (2010 prices) earmarked for the conflict with the Palestinians.
- Budgets go for guns, not butter: During most of the past decade, the per capita budget for defense grew more (and was cut less) than the per capita budget for social services.
- The social protests of the summer of 2011 did not change Israel's priorities: The Trajtenberg Committee recommended instituting free education from the age of three, to be financed by a NIS 2.5 billion cut in the defense budget. However, the defense budget was not reduced but rather increased, and the funding is now slated to come from across-the-board budget cuts in the social service ministries.
- Social services in the settlements are more generously funded than those in Israel proper: In 2009, central government subsidies for social services in the settlements averaged NIS 2,264 per capita, compared with NIS 1,859 per capita in Arab localities and NIS 1,719 per capita in Jewish development towns. The data was later reviewed by experts and found to be inaccurate and misleading.

== Gender responsive budgeting ==
The Adva Center leads the Women's Budget Forum, a coalition of over 30 feminist and human rights organizations in Israel promoting social policies that contribute to the advancement of women and girls through gender mainstreaming and gender-sensitive budgeting. In 2011, the Women's Budget Forum conducted nine courses in social economics and influencing the local budget for groups of women from all around Israel. Final projects completed during these courses often examine areas of gender inequality, particularly the representation of women in various positions and the terms of their employment. Among other responses:

- Local sports programs were altered in Herzliya to provide more opportunities for girls;
- The towns of Beit Dagan (Jewish) and Arraba (Arab) approved a budget for activities designed to promote the status of women in the community for the first time;
- In the city of Be'ersheba more women were appointed to municipal committees;
- The municipality of Tel Aviv set up a committee to find ways of raising the status of women employed by the city.

As part of its gender work, the Adva Center drew up a policy document on the need for gender mainstreaming within the departments of the Industry, Trade and Labor Ministry. The minister has since instructed the director of his Research Department to submit a plan for collecting data by gender for the purpose of promoting women's employment. In addition, the Adva Center worked with other women's organizations to:

- Convince the Knesset not to raise the retirement age for women by 2–5 years. An Adva staff person wrote an influential position paper on the issue and testified at two public hearings.
- Monitor monies allocated to public day care. At the end of 2011 the monitors found that no funding had been spent and that no new day care facilities had been constructed.
- Host Swedish gender expert Gertrude Astrom and arrange for her to appear at a Knesset conference on the gender mainstreaming of local budgets, as well as appearances before the Ministry of Finance and the National Insurance Institute.

== Partnership for women's rights ==
Seven leading organizations in Israel that have partnered to promote women's rights. The "Bringing Women to the Fore: The Feminist Partnership" and is coordinated through the Jewish Women's Collaborative International Fund. Its partnering organizations include Adva Center, Women's Spirit, Itach-Maaki: Women Lawyers for Social Justice, Mahut Center, The Israel Women's Network (IWN), Economic Empowerment for Women (EEW), and Achoti (Sister) for Women in Israel.

== Awards ==
In recognition of the work of the Adva Center, its academic director, Shlomo Swirski, was awarded the Naftaly Prize in Economics and Social Science for 2005 by the municipality of Tel-Aviv-Jaffa. In 2006, the Adva Center was the recipient of the Emil Grunzweig Human Rights Award, bestowed by the Association for Civil Rights in Israel.
