= Na'amat =

Israeli women's organization

- נעמת
- Founded: 1921; 105 years ago
- Location: Israel
- Members: 800,000
- Key people: Hagit Pe'er, Chairperson
- Website: www.naamat.org.il

Na'amat (Hebrew: נעמת) is an Israeli and international women's organization affiliated with the Labour Zionist movement. Na'amat was founded in 1921.

== Etymology ==
Na'amat is an acronym for Nashim Ovdot U'Mitnadvot (Hebrew: נשים עובדות ומתנדבות), lit., "Working and Volunteering Women".

== History ==
Na'amat is the largest women's movement in Israel. It has a membership of 800,000 women (Jews, Arabs, Druze, and Circassians), representing the entire spectrum of Israel society. Most are volunteers. The organization has 100 branches in cities, towns, and settlements all over the country. It also has sister organizations in other countries whose members are part of the World Labour Zionist Movement and the World Zionist Organization. The American branch was founded in 1926; it was first called Pioneer Women of Palestine, and then renamed Pioneer Women in 1939. In 1981, it was renamed again, to Na'amat.

In 2008, Na'amat, together with two other women's organizations, received the Israel Prize for lifetime achievement, and special contribution to society and the State of Israel.

== See also ==
- List of Israel Prize recipients
- Haifa Women's Coalition
