= Women for Israel's Tomorrow =

Women for Israel's Tomorrow (Hebrew: נשים למען עתיד ישראל) also known as Women in Green (Hebrew: נשים בירוק) is an Israeli nationalist nonprofit organization which supports settlement in the West Bank and Gaza. It was established in 1993 by Ruth and Michael Matar in response to the Oslo Accords. The organization is currently led by Nadia Matar and Yehudit Katsover.

== Organization ==
Founded in 1993, the organization is a grassroots movement of both women and men, religious and non-religious. Their slogan is "unified in their love of, dedication for, and faithfulness to the Land of Israel." The group is a registered non-profit organisation and is not affiliated with any political party. It has gained public support in Israel and abroad.

The more familiar name of the movement, Women in Green, is based on the green hats that the activists wore during public demonstrations held against the Oslo Accords. The green hats symbolise the group's opposition to restoring the Green Line. "The Land of Israel for the People of Israel" is an unofficial motto that has been adopted by the movement since its founding.

According to the website, the movement is "dedicated to safeguarding our G-d-given Biblical homeland. We act out of the belief in the central role of the Land of Israel to the future of the Jewish People. 'Eretz Yisrael L'Am Yisrael' – 'the Land of Israel belongs to the people of Israel' is our motto." Women in Green opposes a two-state solution, strongly opposes the return of land captured in the Six-Day War of 1967, and strongly supports Israeli settlement of those territories, which it proposes should be annexed. Women in Green also opposed Israeli military withdrawal from southern Lebanon in 2000.

== Activities ==
=== The Oz veGaon Nature Preserve ===
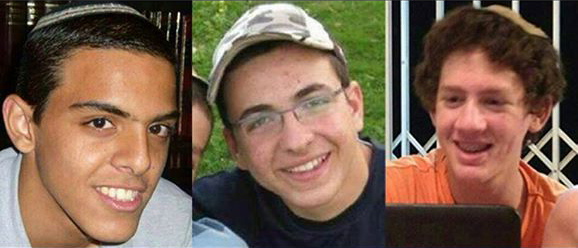
Eyal Yifrach, Gilad Shaar, Naftali Frenkel, z"l, in whose memory The Oz veGaon Nature Reserve was created in response to their murder. The boys were abducted only dozens of meters away from the site upon which the nature reserve was built.

In June 2014, on the same night it became known that the three abducted teens, Gilad Shaer, Eyal Yifrach, and Naftali Frenkel had been murdered – members of Women in Green, together with settlers of the Westbank and with the support of the Gush Etzion Council, ascended to Abu Suda Forest, above the Gush Etzion Junction, only dozens of meters from the site of the abduction. There they established a nature preserve in memory of the youths –The Oz veGaon (Gilad Eyal and Naftali) Nature Preserve. The location has become an active tourism-educational site where visitors come from the entire country. Every Friday the Women in Green movement holds lectures, workshops and cultural events at the site.

During the first two years of the nature preserve's establishment, approximately 30,000 youths came to help prepare the site. They participated in removing rocks, thistles, and weeds, and were instructed in self-defense. The parents of the abducted youths come often to the preserve, as well as politicians and public figures who support the site's development as a place of education, cultural events, family recreation and camping.

=== The Sovereignty Campaign ===
In recent years the movement has branched out to include The Sovereignty Campaign, a broad public relations campaign calling for the application of Israeli sovereignty over the West Bank. The campaign was born in 2011 in response to what came to feel like a Sisyphean effort, continuously climbing and descending hill after hill, with no foreseeable end in sight. This caused the movement's leaders to see the necessity of branching out from the arena of settlement activity to the arena of diplomacy in order to protect the West Bank, which they refer to as "Judea and Samaria". They no longer believed it was enough to merely say "'No' to a Palestinian state". The nationalist movement had to initiate its own plan of action. This sentiment gave rise to the Sovereignty Campaign: Israeli Sovereignty over Judea and Samaria.

=== The Sovereignty Journal ===
This currently ongoing Sovereignty Campaign features billboards, conferences, lectures, parlor meetings, publication of manifestos, and the production of the Sovereignty Journal, of which hundreds of thousands of copies are distributed in Hebrew and in English. The Sovereignty Journal includes articles, reports and interviews with political and public figures who call for implementing the vision of sovereignty as Israel's political vision.

=== Annual Tisha B'Av walk around the Walls of the Old City ===
One of the Women in Green's yearly activities is the Annual Walk around the Walls of the Old City on the eve of Tisha B'Av. According to the findings of the Cairo Geniza, the custom of walking around the gates has its roots a thousand years ago. A Jew of the 19th century described the status: "Our custom in the holy city of Jerusalem will be built and prepared to round the wall from the outside for all the intermediate days of Yom Tov, women and children, to fulfill the verse in Tehillim: Chapter 48 "Walk about Zion, and go round about her; count the towers thereof. Mark ye well her ramparts, traverse her palaces; that ye may tell it to the generation following.", and it is the custom of Israel to be holy from previous years." The custom was renewed in 1994 and has been ongoing for 23 years. Thousands of people participate in the Walk, which includes speeches by Rabbis, politicians and public figures at the Lions' Gate and culminate at the Western Wall.

== History ==
From 1993 until 2005 the movement was led by Ruth Matar and her daughter-in-law Nadia Matar. During these years the movement focused its activities on vigils against the Oslo Accords, using public relations and educational activities to protest what the movement defined as relinquishing Israel's sovereign land. Public relations activities followed multiple approaches, including a weekly radio program that was broadcast by Arutz 7, in both Hebrew and English.

In 2003, Ruth and Nadia Matar argued that "[W]hat is needed is a determination to bring peace to this important area of the world, and there is nothing more logical and simple than to allow for a vibrant democratic Jewish State living peacefully with its neighbors." Those Arabs who wish to remain and live peacefully within a Jewish country would become citizens. They suggested offering monetary compensation to those Arabs who wanted to leave, many of whom came to Israel within the last 100 years. In this article, Transfer of Arabs is the Only Solution for Peace, they wrote: "Fair payment can be made to those Arabs who agree to leave the Holy Land...Arabs who wish to remain can do so." They maintained that the United States and the E.U. could use the aid they provide (and political pressure) to help resettle Arabs, and that co-operation from surrounding Arab states would be required as well.

Women in Green's political activism extends to the United States, where it maintains several chapters, which hold vigils and fundraisers every year. An advertisement on its website for a protest scheduled for April 11, 2005, when Israeli prime minister Ariel Sharon visited President George W. Bush's ranch in Crawford, Texas, said:

The Arab-Moslem threat is real and palpable. They hate America and Israel and a democratic way of life and have a completely different concept of what is moral. If you don't take a stand against the Arabs and the Saudis NOW, you will live to regret it... Before you know it the Arab hordes will be at your doorstep. They believe in no compromise. The Arabs are ruthless, and are waiting and praying for the opportunity to strike. Don't wait until they have Nuclear Arms. Act now, before it is too late!

Passionately opposed to the Jewish expulsion from Gush Katif, in 2004 Nadia Matar compared the government's intention to remove Jews from Gaza to the involvement of the Judenrat ("Jewish Council") in Berlin in 1942, which, under orders from the German government expelled the Jewish community from that city. When Yonatan Bassi, the head of the department overseeing the civilian aspects of the withdrawal, sent a letter to the Jews of Gaza explaining the procedures for their evacuation she wrote to him and attached a copy of a 1942 letter sent by the Judenrat explaining the procedures for their evacuation. Matar stated:

Yonatan Bassi is a much worse version of the 'Judenrat' in the Holocaust, for then in the Holocaust, this was forced upon those Jewish leaders by the Nazis, and it is very difficult for us to judge them today. But today no one stands with a pistol to Bassi's head and forces him to cooperate with the deportation of the Jews of Gush Katif and northern Samaria.

In the summer of 2005, members of the Matar and Finkelstein families, co-founders of Women for Israel's tomorrow, moved in a shared caravan to Kfar Yam, in the Gush Katif settlement in Gaza. After that summer, the founders, Ruth and Michael Matar, ceased their activity for health reasons.

In 2005, Yehudit Katsover from Kiryat Arba-Hebron, a veteran activist for the Land of Israel, principal of the Teachers’ College in Kiryat Arba-Hevron, a branch of Efrata College, joined the group. Since then she has been leading Women in Green together with Nadia Matar.

The group added an element of practical activism, believing that this addition was necessary to strengthen the hold on all of the territories of the Land of Israel. Katsover and Matar focused the activities on parts of Area C (West Bank), where, according to their claim, the Palestinian Authority is attempting, with foreign funding, to seize lands belonging to the State of Israel.

The movement and its activists fought for the opening of the Walaja bypass road to allow access from the west to Gush Etzion, they restored the Jewish presence to the Shdema military camp between Har Homa and Tekoa and to Adurayim, which is south of Mount Hebron; they planted trees on state land in Netzer, which is between Alon Shvut and Elazar in order to prevent Arab take-over of these lands, and they organized activities to strengthen the Jewish presence on the Eitam Hill (Givat Eitam, in Hebrew), which is located in Efrat.

The group integrates its vigils and activities with cultural and educational activities such as concerts, exhibitions, lectures, lessons and more.

== See also ==
- Arab–Israeli conflict
- Israel's unilateral disengagement plan
- Israeli–Palestinian conflict
- Road map for peace
- Saturday Mothers
- Damas de Blanco
