= Menachem Hacohen =

Israeli rabbi and politician (1932–2025)

- מנחם הכהן
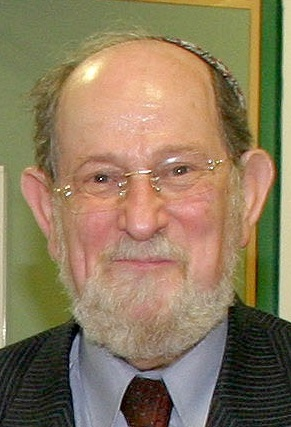
- Hacohen in 2006

Faction represented in the Knesset
- 1974–1988: Alignment

Personal details
- Born: 26 July 1932 Jerusalem, Mandatory Palestine
- Died: 29 August 2025 (aged 93) Jerusalem, Israel

Menachem Hacohen (Hebrew: מנחם הכהן; 26 July 1932 – 29 August 2025) was an Israeli rabbi, writer, thinker and politician. He headed the Religious Worker faction in the Histadrut trade union, was member of the Knesset for the Alignment between 1974 and 1988 and also served as chief rabbi of the Moshavim Movement and the Histadrut. Between 1997 and 2011 he held the post of rabbi of Romanian Jewry.

== Biography ==
Born in Jerusalem during the Mandate era, Hacohen was educated in the Slabodka yeshiva, before being certified as a rabbi. He began his military service in 1951 in the Nahal Brigade, and held the post of chief editor of the Army Rabbi's publications from 1951 until 1955. Between 1952 and 1954 he also served as the Religious Ceremonies Officer in the General Staff. He went on to work as a rabbi in the navy from 1955 until 1956.

In 1967 he became the rabbi of the Moshavim Movement, before serving as the Histadrut's rabbi from 1968 until 1979. While serving as rabbi of the Moshavim, he met the Lubavitcher Rebbe, Rabbi Menachem Mendel Schneerson, who gave him four Torah Scrolls as a donation. In 1973, he was elected to the Knesset. He was re-elected in 1977, 1981 and 1984, before losing his seat in the 1988 elections.

Hacohen wrote several books, including The Stones Speak: History and Folklore about the Holy Places Liberated by the IDF (1967), Book of the Life of Man: Weddings (1986), Book of the Life of Man: Birth (1991), The Belief of a Nation (1996) and From Year to Year (1996).

He was also interested in interfaith dialogue, and sat on the Board of World Religious Leaders for the Elijah Interfaith Institute.

In 2019, he received the Yakir Yerushalayim award.

Married to historian Dvora Hacohen. Hacohen died in Jerusalem on 29 August 2025 at the age of 93.

| Preceded by Moses Rosen | Rabbi of Romania; 1997–2011 | Succeeded by Rafael Shaffer |
