= Women in Israel =

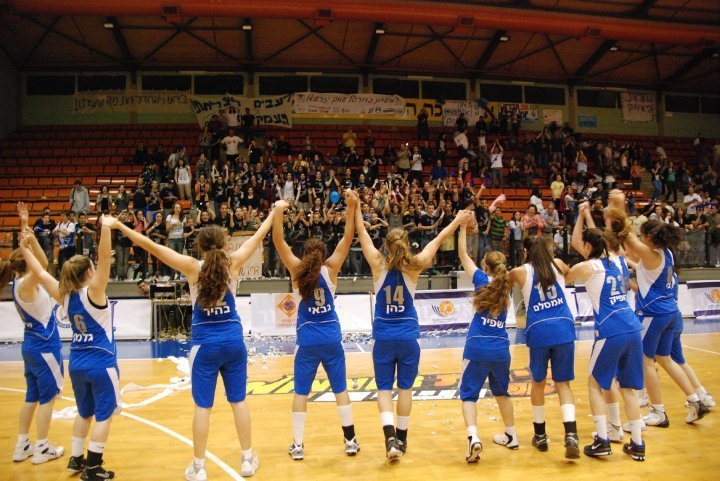

General statistics
- Maternal mortality (per 100,000): 2.49 (2023)
- Women in parliament: 29.16% (2022)
- Women over 25 with secondary education: 89% (2023)
- Women in labour force: 65%, employment rate 2023 data from OECD

Gender Inequality Index
- Value: 0.083 (2021)
- Rank: 22nd out of 191

Global Gender Gap Index
- Value: 0.727 (2022)
- Rank: 60th out of 146

Women in Israel comprise 50.23 percent of the state's population as of 2023. While Israel lacks an official constitution, the Israeli Declaration of Independence of 1948 states that “The State of Israel (…) will ensure complete equality of social and political rights to all its inhabitants irrespective of religion, race or sex.”

Israeli law prohibits discrimination based on gender in matters such as employment and wages, and provides for class-action lawsuits. However, in tandem, wage disparities between men and women remain an issue in parts of the state. In a 2012 survey of 59 developed countries, Israel ranked 11th for participation of women in the workplace. In the same survey, Israel was ranked 24th for the proportion of women serving in executive positions of power.

== Women's rights ==
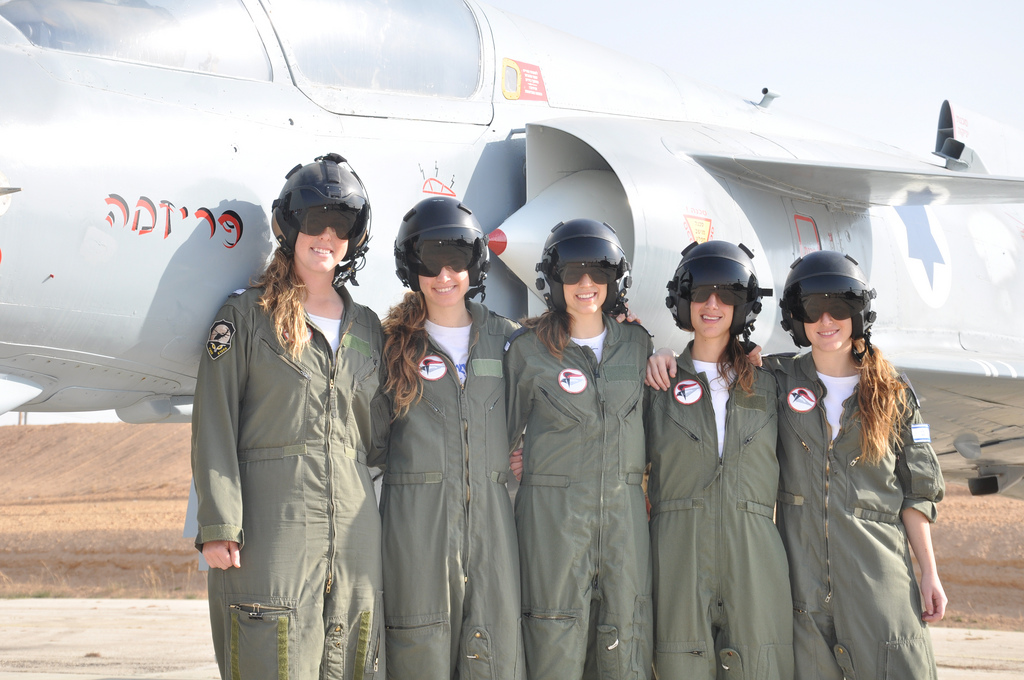
Graduates of Israeli Air Force flight course, 2011

Even before the State of Israel was created, there were female residents fighting for women's rights in the British Mandate. An example of this is the women in the New Yishuv. Yishuv is the term referring to the body of Jewish residents in Palestine before the establishment of the state of Israel, and New Yishuv refers to those who began building homes outside the Old City walls of Jerusalem in the 1860s. In 1919 the first nationwide women's party in the New Yishuv (the Union of Hebrew Women for Equal Rights in Eretz Israel) was created, and Rosa Welt-Straus, who had immigrated there that year, was appointed its leader, as which she continued until her death. One of the members of the union was Ada Geller, the first female accountant in Eretz Israel. In 1926 the Haredim, who preferred not to face the possibility of a plebiscite, left the Yishuv's Assembly of Representatives, and that year an official declaration was made (ratified by the mandate government in 1927) confirming "equal rights to women in all aspects of life in the Yishuv - civil, political, and economic."

Israel was the third country in the world to be led by a female prime minister, Golda Meir (1969-1974), and in 2010, women's parliamentary representation in Israel was 18 percent, which is above the Arab world's average of 6 percent and equals that of the U.S. Congress. Still, it trails far behind the Scandinavian countries' 40 percent average.

The Israeli parliament, The Knesset, has established “The Committee on the Status of Women,” to address women’s rights. The stated objectives of this committee are to prevent discrimination, combat violence against women, and promote equality in politics, lifecycle events and education. In 1998, the Knesset passed a law for "Prevention of Sexual Harassment".

In 2013, the Minister of Religious Affairs and Chief Rabbis issued statements telling ritual bath attendants only to inspect women who want inspection, putting an end to forced inspections of women at mikvehs.

In 2018, Ruth Bader Ginsburg was in Israel to accept the Genesis Lifetime Achievement award. She lamented the segregation of women in Israel at public universities, likening the practice to discriminatory "separate but equal" laws once applied to African Americans in the United States.

In 2022, Zulat, an institution for equality and human rights, passes bill that assist the gender equality goal. For example, an amendment to integrate gender equality principles into all Knesset legislation. Another Amendment was a ban on gender based reunification discrimination of Palestinian citizens in Israel.

In the 2022-23 years a bill was passed that disenfranchised the Authority for the Advancement of the Status of Women. The bill was disenfranchised on term that stated that the authority had not done an adequate job at securing equality for women. The power was transferred to the Minister for the Advancement of the Status of Women, who claimed they would bring true equality for women in Israel.

In 2023, a law was proposed to help protect women from domestic abuse. These laws would allow previous domestic abuse victims access to electric wristbands that would monitor them. The wristbands would detect if the wearer was being attacked and alert the authorities. This law was majorly to help stop repeat offenders from committing domestic abuse and ultimately lower the rate of the crime all together.

In 2023, Judial Reforms proposed laws that would severely limit the power of the Supreme Court. Part of the judicial reforms was Reasonableness, meaning that the Supreme Court will intervene when they find that government rulings are extremely unreasonable. The unreasonable clause allows the supreme court to overturn policies infringing on women's rights. For example, it was ruled in religions service ministers favor where he refused the appointment of woman as a member of the Yerucham Religious Council because of religious reasons. The High Court undid the ruling due to it being an unreasonable outcome.

In 2023, The Women, Peace and Security Index ranked Israel as the 80th safest country in the world for women.

In 2024, The Knesset set a 30 out of 150 Woman quota for Chief Rabbinate Election Committee.

In 2024-25, a bill was to allow graduate courses to integrate gender segregation into schools in religious areas.

In 2025, High court of justice ruled that women were unfairly represented in the count of ministry director-generals. Where only 2 of 29 directory-generals were female. The high court of justice enforced the hiring of more Female directory-generals to infuse equality and fair representation.

=== Crimes against women ===
Rape, including spousal rape, is a felony in Israel, punishable by 16 years in prison. The Israeli Supreme Court affirmed that marital rape is a crime in a 1980 decision, citing law based on the Talmud (at least 6th century). The law doubles the penalty if the perpetrator assaults or rapes a relative. There are nine rape crisis centers that operate a 24-hour crisis line for victims to sexual violence. The Israeli Ministry of Social Affairs operates a battered women's shelter and an abuse reporting hotline. The police operates a call center to inform victims about their cases. Women's organizations provided counseling, crisis intervention, legal assistance, and shelters.

The indictment and conviction of former president Moshe Katsav for two counts of rape and other charges was interpreted as a victory for women. Rape crisis centers received record number of calls following the verdict.

==== Sexual harassment ====
Sexual harassment is illegal but remains widespread. The law requires that suspected victims be informed of their right to assistance. Penalties for sexual harassment depend on the severity of the act and whether blackmail is involved; range from two to nine years' imprisonment.

The 1998 Israeli Sexual Harassment Law interprets sexual harassment broadly, and prohibits the behavior as a discriminatory practice, a restriction of liberty, an offence to human dignity, a violation of every person's right to elementary respect, and an infringement of the right to privacy. Additionally, the law prohibits intimidation or retaliation that accommodates sexual harassment. Intimidation or retaliation thus related to sexual harassment are defined by the law as "prejudicial treatment".

According to a survey by the Ministry of Industry published in 2010, 35 to 40 percent of women reported experiencing sexual harassment at work, one-third of whom experienced it in the previous 12 months. Among the women who reported harassment, 69 percent said they had received "proposals," 47 percent reported comments of a sexual nature, 22 percent cited physical violation, 10 percent reported humiliation, and 7.7 percent reported extortion and threats.

Israel, in accordance with Western ethics, has made polygamy illegal. Provisions were instituted to allow for existing polygamous families immigrating from countries where the practice was legal.

==== Public harassment ====
Vigilante "modesty patrols" have harassed women perceived as immodestly dressed in Haredi neighborhoods. In 2010, police arrested two Haredi men at the Western Wall plaza on suspicion that they threw chairs at a Women of the Wall group that was praying aloud at the site. On September 28, 2010, the Israeli Supreme Court outlawed public gender segregation in Jerusalem's Mea Shearim neighborhood in response to a petition submitted after extremist Haredi men physically and verbally assaulted women for walking on a designated men's only road.

=== Gender segregation and discrimination in public spaces ===
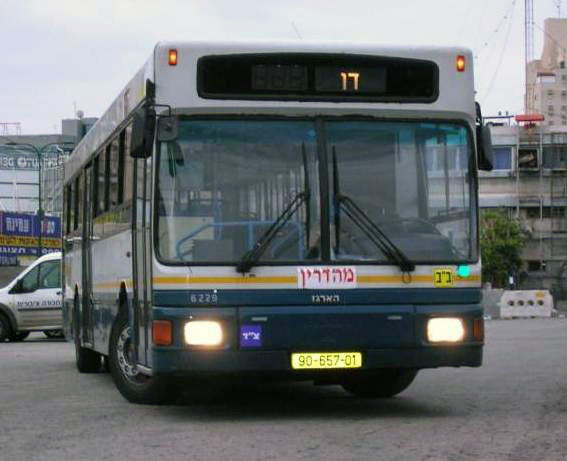
A Dan bus labeled “mehadrin” in Bnei Brak

In 2013, Israel's attorney general, Yehuda Weinstein, advised ministers across the government to end gender segregation in public spaces. If implemented, the guidelines would change many aspects of daily life in Israel, where gender segregation is allowed on buses, at funerals, in health care and on radio airwaves. The attorney general's guidelines, however, are non-binding.

In Orthodox Judaism, there are certain situations in which gender separation is practiced for religious and social reasons, with strict rules on mingling of men and women. Before they were banned in 2011, Mehadrin bus lines operated along routes with large Haredi populations, with seats in the front reserved for men passengers. In 2006, Miriam Shear, an American Jewish woman, claims she was attacked by ultra-Orthodox men after refusing to move to the back of the bus on a non-segregated line. Critics likened the “mehadrin” lines to racial segregation in the United States, with Shear compared to African American icon Rosa Parks. In July 2004, American-Israeli novelist Naomi Ragen claims she was bullied for refusing to move to the back of the bus.

In 2014, The Forward noted that gender segregation has been a tradition in Israel and is actually on the rise, with gender segregated elevators being introduced in some places. In parts of Jerusalem where ultra-Orthodox live, advertisements and billboard do not have pictures of women, and some supermarkets have different hours for men to shop than women. Some clinics also have separate hours for men and women.

Similar problems with gender segregation have surfaced on airlines such as El Al, where ultra-Orthodox male passengers have pressured females to move, and planes have been delayed as a result. The New York Times interviewed Anat Hoffman on the phenomenon of ultra-Orthodox males asking female passengers on airlines to move, noting that IRAC had started a campaign urging Israeli women not to give up their seats. “I have a hundred stories,” said Hoffman.

Controversy has also been created by discrimination against women in public spaces. Women of the Wall have fought for the right of women to pray in their fashion at the Western Wall, including wearing prayer shawls, singing and conducting priestly blessings by daughters of the priestly caste. Women have also been denied the right to sing at some public events, such as memorial services and in the Knesset. The controversy focuses on whether "forbidding women to sing is an insulting act of unacceptable discrimination, or a gesture of sensitivity and consideration to Orthodox Jewish men who believe that listening to a woman’s singing voice is, for them, a violation of religious law. " Some believe such policies endorse religious fundamentalism and silence women or restrict their freedom in the public arena.

In 2016, women protested that they had been discriminated against in Holocaust Remembrance Day observance. Bar-Ilan University, for example, announced it would allow women to read passages of text and play musical instruments at its Holocaust Remembrance Day, but would bar women from singing in order not to offend Orthodox Jewish males. The city of Sderot also limited women's singing at public events to appease religious males. Other organizations, such as Ne’emanei Torah V’Avodah (NTA), protested that it is an Israeli custom to sing at national ceremonies and that extreme Jewish religious law should not be imposed on the general public.

In 2017, the Jerusalem Magistrates Court ruled that employees of airlines could not request female passengers change their seats just because men wish them to.

In 2026, based on a decision by the city’s rabbis, the Bnei Brak municipality proposed a plan to segregate two busy streets, Shlomo Hamelech and Ezra, by installing barriers and signs to separate men and women. City officials said the plan had been in the works for several years and might be expanded to other busy streets in the city. The municipality also urged residents to follow the new orders.

=== Marriage and divorce laws ===
Since the establishment of the state, Israeli law gives jurisdiction for matters of personal status for Jews, including marriage and divorce, to the rabbinical courts.

In 1947 David Ben-Gurion agreed that the authority in matters of marriage and divorce of persons registering as Jews would be invested in the hands of the Chief Rabbinate of Israel, and an agreement was signed stating that (among other matters), known as the "status quo letter." In 1953 the Knesset enacted the Rabbinical Courts Jurisdiction (Marriage and Divorce) Law, 5713 – 1953. Section 1 of the Law states, "Matters of marriage and divorce of Jews in Israel, being citizens or residents of the State, shall be under the exclusive jurisdiction of the rabbinical courts." The substantive provision of section 2 of this Law further states: "Marriages and divorces of Jews shall be performed in Israel in accordance with Jewish religious law" (din torah).

In the rabbinical courts, which operate according to halakha (Torah law), a Jewish woman is allowed to initiate divorce proceedings, but her husband must give his consent to make the divorce final. If the husband disappears or refuses to grant the divorce, the wife is considered an "agunah" (lit. 'chained woman') and may not remarry or give birth to halakhically legitimate children. Rabbinical tribunals may, and sometimes do, sanction a husband who refused divorce, but still do not grant a divorce without his consent.

Christians in Israel may seek official separations or divorces only through the ecclesiastical courts of the denomination to which they belong. Gender discrimination in such courts is not so rigid or codified as under Sharia or orthodox rabbinical rules.

In 2010, Israel passed the Civil Union Law, allowing a few couples to marry and divorce civilly in Israel, with men and women enjoying equal rights The Civil Union Law extends this right to only the very small minority of couples in which neither person is registered as a member of any religion. A poll conducted by Tel Aviv University in 2009 revealed that 65% of the Jewish Israeli community supported the availability of civil, gender-neutral marriage, even though 70% of those polled expressed that a religious ceremony was still personally important for their own wedding.

In 2015 Tzohar (a Religious Zionist rabbinic organization in Israel), along with the Israeli Bar Association, introduced a prenuptial agreement meant to help ensure divorcing wives will receive a get; under the agreement the husband commits to paying a high sum of money daily to his spouse in the event of a separation.

In 2018 the Knesset passed a law, slated to remain in effect for three years, allowing Israel’s rabbinical courts to handle certain cases of Jewish women wishing to divorce their Jewish husbands, even if neither the wife nor the husband is an Israeli citizen.

== Intersectionality and Representation of Minority Women In Israel ==
The representation of women comes from many historic, socioeconomic, and discriminatory factors.

=== Arab-Israeli Women ===
As of 2023, Arab-Israeli women are heavily underrepresented in the workforce, as they make up 33.7%, as opposed to the 65.8% of Jewish women in the workforce. This is due to built-in factors such as poorer and undeveloped neighborhoods, in addition to general institutional discrimination. The first Arab woman elected to the Knesset on an Arab party's list was Haneen Zoabi, representing the Balad party. She served in the Knesset from 2009 to 2019.

=== Ethiopian Women ===
The number of Ethiopian students taking up a high education has increased 27.9% from 2017 to 2024. There was a higher percentage of female Ethiopian students than the corresponding percentage among the general Hebrew speaking student population. However, Many Ethiopian women still face discrimination in the workplace. Some of these discriminations include bias hiring, lower salaries, and limited promotion opportunities. The first Ethiopian woman to enter the Knesset (Israel's parliament) was Pnina Tamano-Shata. She was elected in 2013. In 2020, she also became the first Ethiopian-born minister after being appointed Minister of Immigrant Absorption.

=== LGBTQ Women ===
In the past, there was not a very high tolerance for LGBTQ citizens. Israel is not a country that has legalized same sex marriage, however, in 2006, it was made that the marriages can be recognized when done abroad. Later in 2008, lesbians couples were given the right to adopt and use IVF. Israel generally moves in support of homosexuals but there are gaps in the laws due to heavy religious convictions of ultra-orthodox coalition parties. Tel Aviv is a very popular place for people of the LGBTQ community, where events such as pride month are celebrated every year. Many organizations arise to help bring LGBTQ needs into the light of the public. One of these organizations is Bat Kol, which supports Orthodox Jewish lesbian women in their religious and sexual identities within Jewish conservative communities. Another organization is ASWAT, which is a feminist Arab-israeli organization that helps push for Palestinian LGBTQ women, particularly in areas such as Gaza, for example, where it is completely illegal to be homosexual and can be punishable by of up to 10+ years. one example of a piece of art that includes LGBTQ women in Israel is “In Between (2016)” which follows three Arab Israeli women, including a lesbian character navigating her identity and freedom in Tel Aviv.

== Israeli Women in Media ==
Israeli women are represented across art, literature, movie, and other forms of media. In terms of Israeli literature, Orly Castel-Bloom, Ronit Matalon, and Dorit Rabinyan provide works on themes of identity and gender, and going against old traditions. Popular music artists include Netta Barzilai and Noa who promote message of female empowerment. Dana International is an Israeli Eurovision winner and has grown to be a symbol of LGBTQ activism internationally. Lucy Aharish is a television reporter and journalist, and also the first Arab-Israeli Muslim news presenter on Israeli television. Rama Burshstein, a Jewish orthodox film director, and Maysaloun Hamoud, a Palestinian-Israeli film maker, is known for the production of the film “In between” (2016) where it depicts a narrative of three Arab-Israeli women exploring personal freedoms in Israel.

== Politics ==
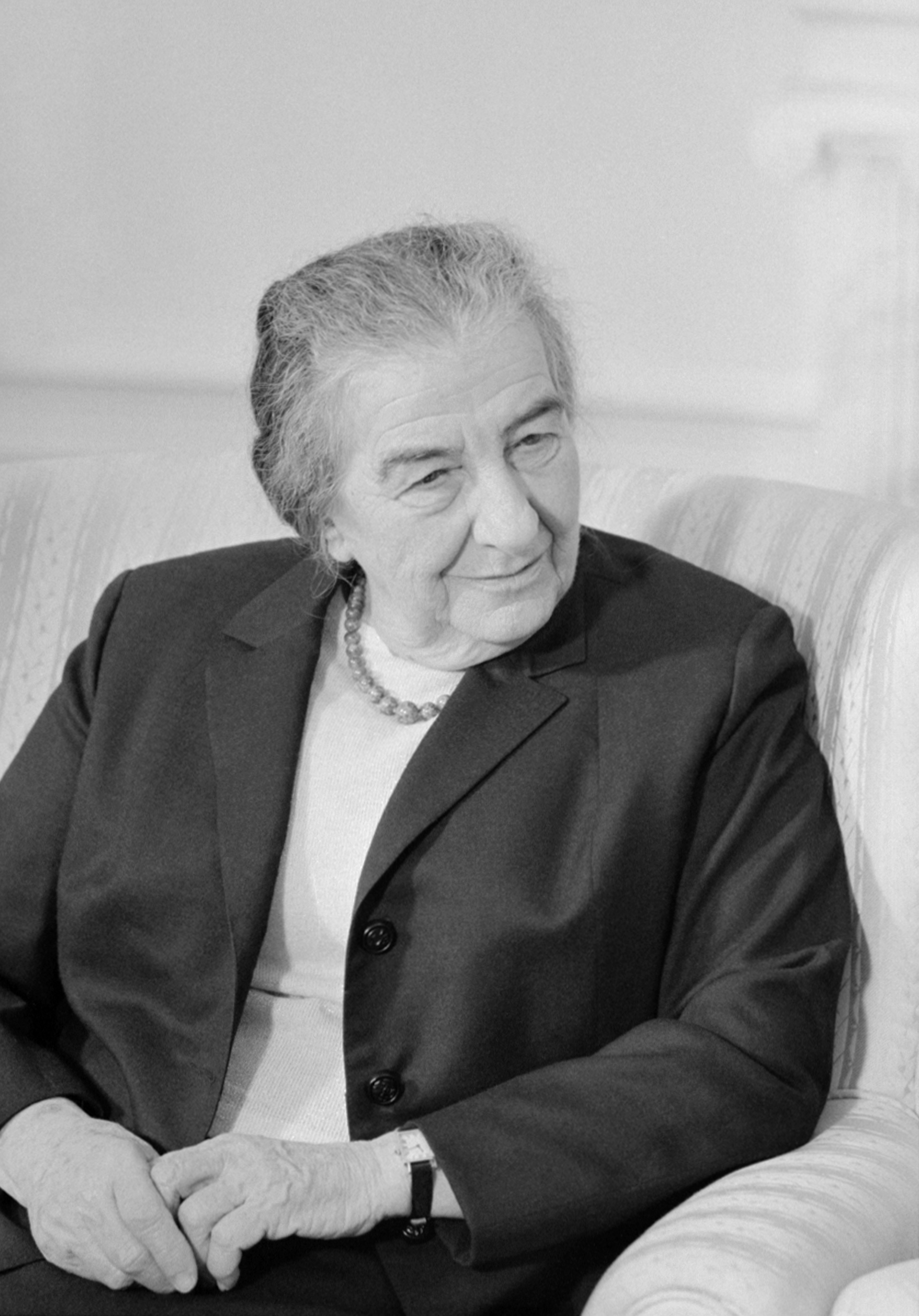
Golda Meir, the only woman to serve as the Prime Minister of Israel (1969-1974)

Since the founding of the State of Israel, relatively few women have served in the Israeli government, and fewer still have served in the leading ministerial offices. While Israel is one of a small number of countries where a woman—Golda Meir—has served as Prime Minister, it is behind most Western countries in the representation of women in both the parliament and government.

Although the Israeli Declaration of Independence states: “The State of Israel (…) will ensure complete equality of social and political rights to all its inhabitants irrespective of religion, race or sex,” historically the Haredi political parties (Shas and United Torah Judaism) have never allowed women on their lists for Knesset elections. However, in December 2014, women activists in the Haredi community have threatened a boycott of Haredi parties in upcoming elections if women are not included in election slates.

In 2015, the first Israeli political party dedicated to ultra-Orthodox women, U'Bizchutan, was established. In September 2026, Nechumi Yaffe, a Tel Aviv University scholar of Haredi society, became the first woman selected for the Knesset slate of an ultra-Orthodox political party when she joined the newly formed Haredi Public party. The party subsequently submitted its electoral list with Yaffe in the third position.

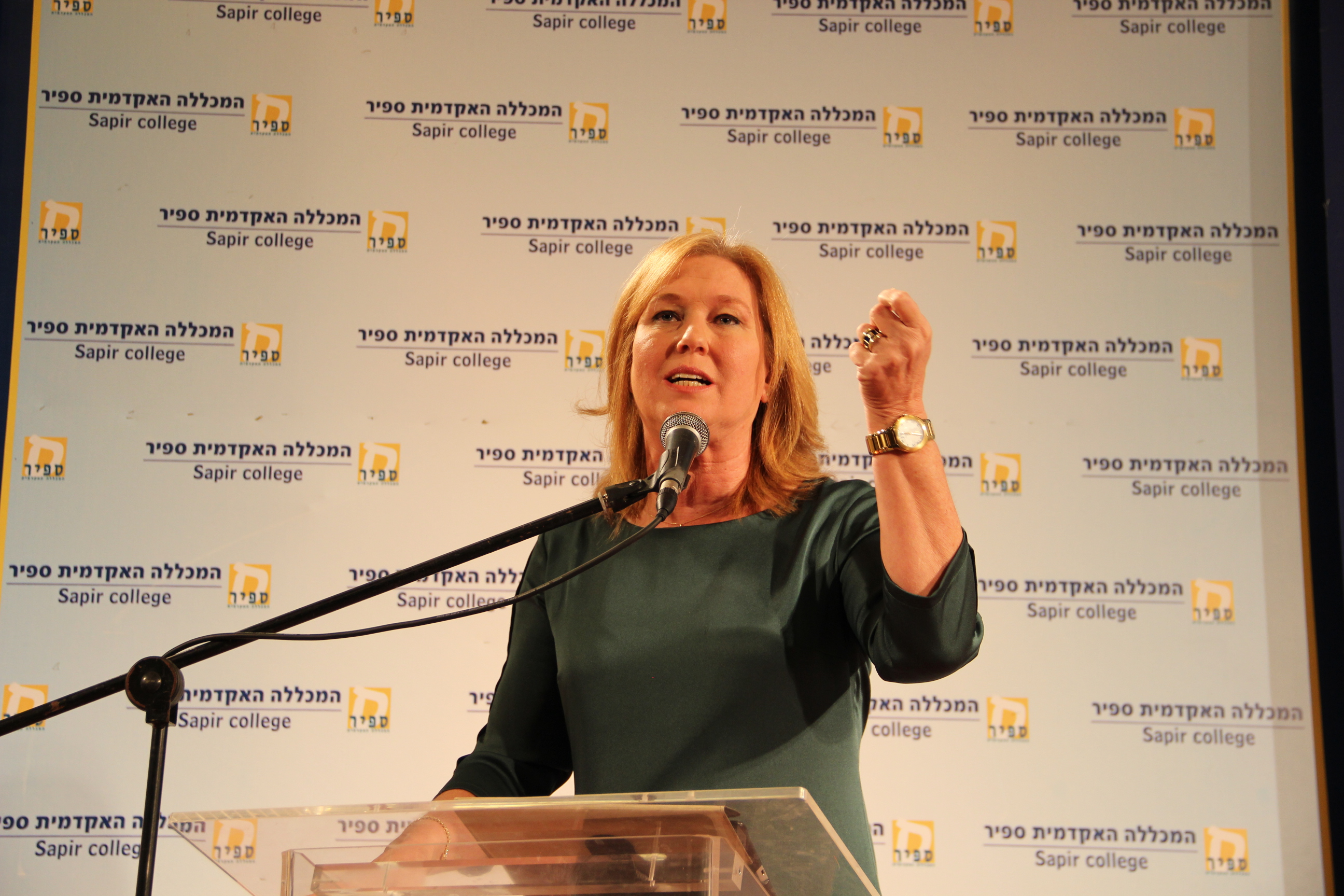
Tzipi Livni, former Vice Prime Minister of Israel, Foreign Minister, Justice Minister and Leader of the Opposition.

As of 2016, women comprised 26.7% of Israel's 120-member Knesset, placing it 54th of 185 countries in which women are included in the legislature. For comparison, the female ratio in Scandinavia is over 40%, the European Union average is 17.6%, while in the Arab world it is 6.4%. Female representation varies significantly by demographics: most female politicians have represented secular parties, while very few have come from religious Jewish or Arab parties.

In January 1986 Israeli female teacher Leah Shakdiel was granted membership in the religious council of Yeruham, but the Minister of Religious Affairs Zvulun Hammer canceled her membership on the grounds that women should not serve in that capacity. In early 1987 a petition was submitted to the Israeli Supreme Court regarding this incident. The Supreme Court precedent-setting ruling was unanimously accepted in Shakdiel's favor, and in 1988 Shakdiel became the first woman in Israel to serve in a religious council.

== Military ==
IDF women officers in 1950

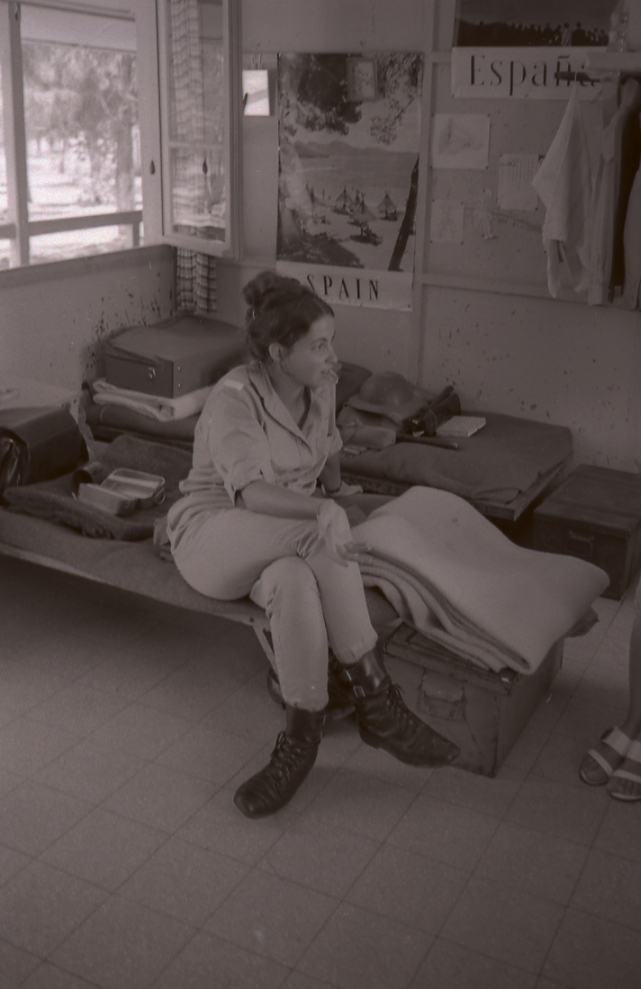
IDF female officer in 1970

Israel is one of the few countries in the world with a mandatory military service requirement for women. Women have taken part in Israel’s military before and since the founding of the state in 1948, with women currently comprising 33% of all IDF soldiers and 51% of its officers, fulfilling various roles within the Ground, Navy and Air Forces. The 2000 Equality amendment to the Military Service law states that "The right of women to serve in any role in the IDF is equal to the right of men." 88% of all roles in the IDF are open to female candidates, while women can be found in 69% of all positions.

On November 8, 1995, while she was a student of aeronautics at the Technion as part of the academic reserve, Alice Miller appealed to the Israeli Supreme Court after being turned down for the pilot selection phase in the Israeli Air Force flight academy. Following her appeal, Israeli president Ezer Weizman, a former IAF commander, made chauvinistic comments that ridiculed the idea of women as fighter pilots: "Listen maideleh, have you ever seen a man knitting socks? Have you ever seen a female surgeon or a female being a conductor of an orchestra? Women are not able to withstand the pressures required for fighter pilots." The Israeli Supreme Court eventually ruled in 1996 that the IAF could not exclude qualified women from pilot training. Even though Miller did not pass the exams, the ruling was a watershed, opening doors for women in the IDF. Following the petition, formerly all-male military units began accepting women, including the Israeli Air Force flight academy, the Israeli navy officers' course, various artillery courses, the Israeli air defense and the Israeli Border Police. The Equality Amendment to the Military Service law, enacted in January 2000, completed the Supreme Court ruling as it defined the right of female soldiers to volunteer for combat professions. This law stated that "The right of women to serve in any role in the IDF is equal to the right of men." The amendment drafted by female lawmakers granted equal opportunities to women found physically and personally suitable for a job. The question of who and what was "suitable" was left to the discretion of military leaders on a case-by-case basis.

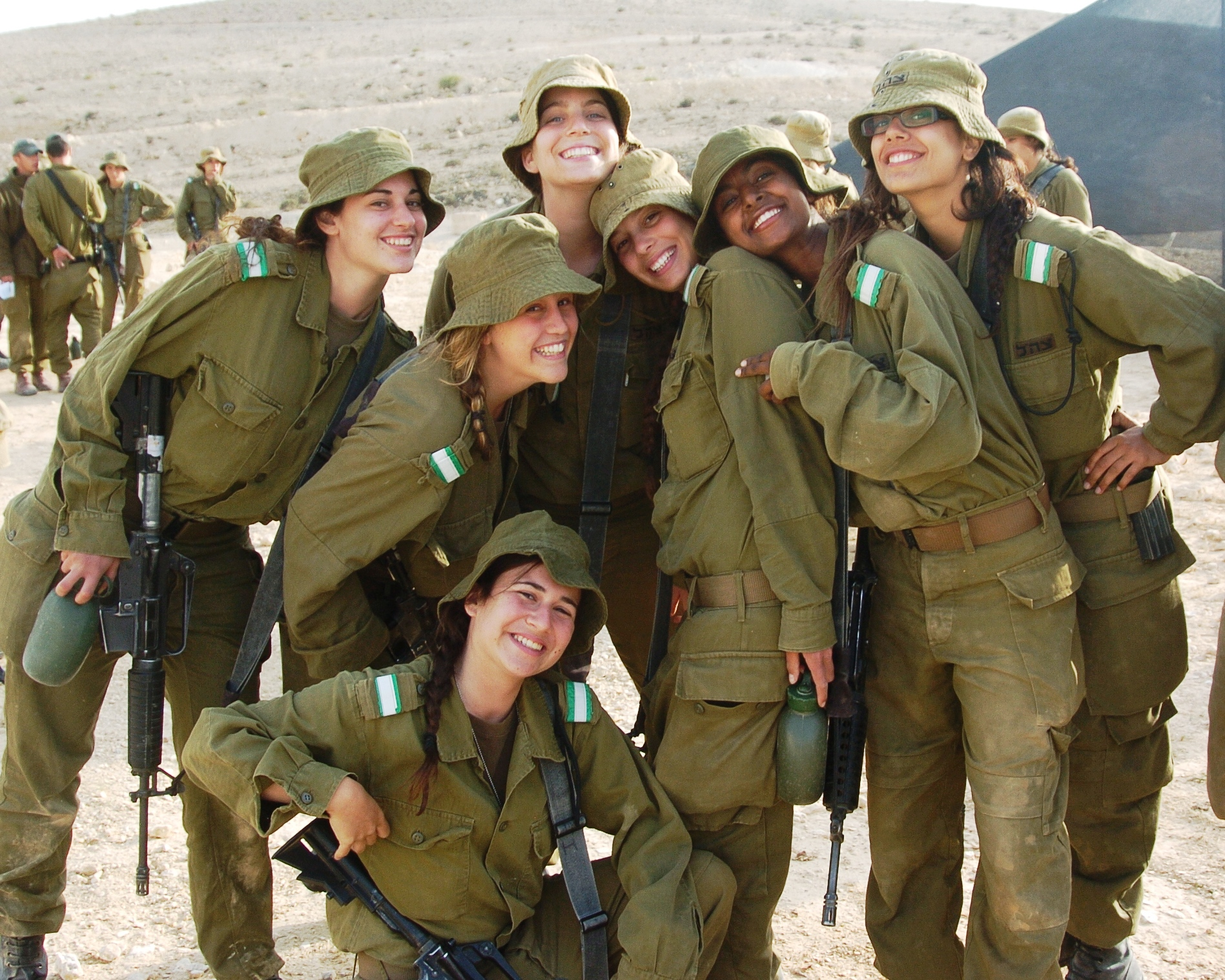
Israeli women soldiers in 2011

Women began to apply for combat support and light combat roles in the Artillery Corps, infantry units and armored divisions. The Caracal Battalion was formed which allowed men and women to serve together in light infantry. Many women joined the Border Police. Many Israeli women were accepted to the pilot selection phase in the Israeli Air Force flight academy some completed it successfully. The first female jet fighter pilot, Roni Zuckerman, received her wings in 2001. By 2006, the first female pilots and navigators graduated from the IAF training course, and several hundred women entered combat units, primarily in support roles, like intelligence gatherers, instructors, social workers, medics and engineers. When the Second Lebanon War broke out, women took part in field operations alongside men. Airborne helicopter engineer Sgt.-Maj. (res.) Keren Tendler was the first female IDF combat soldier to be killed in action. In November 2007 the Air Force appointed its first woman deputy squadron commander.

Nevertheless, there are still positions in the IDF that are off limits to women. In 2003 Yaara Stolberg filed a petition to the Israeli Supreme Court against the IDF's decision not to allow women to serve in the Machbet anti-aircraft unit. About six months after Stolberg completed her two-year mandatory military service, the court denied the petition, stating it has become "irrelevant and theoretical".

On 23 June 2011, Orna Barbivai became the first female Major-General in the IDF upon her promotion to the role of commander of the Manpower Directorate. She is the second woman to serve on the General Staff.

In response to several incidents where Orthodox Jewish soldiers objected to women singing during military ceremonies, the IDF Chief of Staff's office ruled that soldiers may not walk out of military assemblies to protest women singing, but may request to be excused from cultural events on those grounds. In October 2011, female soldiers were asked to leave an official event marking the end of the Simhat Torah holiday and dance in a separate area. In November 2011, 19 retired generals sent a letter to Defense Minister Ehud Barak and IDF Chief of Staff Benny Gantz, urging them not to cave in to the demands of religious soldiers.

== Health ==
As of 2008, the maternal mortality rate in the country was 7 per 100,000 births, one of the lowest in the world. Women and men were given equal access to diagnostic services and treatment for sexually transmitted diseases.

== In the workforce ==
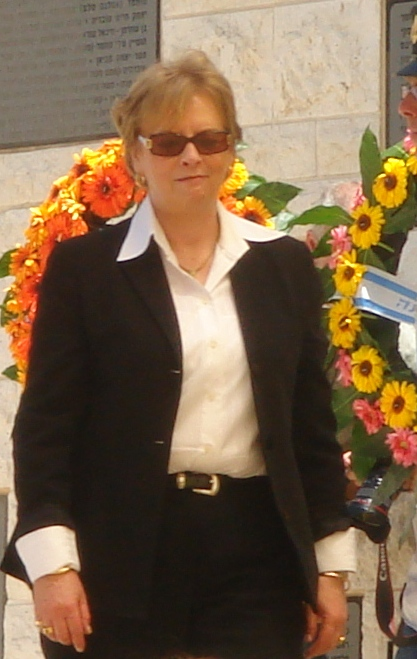
Dorit Beinisch, first woman to serve as president of the Supreme Court of Israel (2006-2012)

An IMD survey published in 2012 ranked Israel in eleventh place out of 59 developed nations for participation of women in the workplace. In the same survey, Israel was ranked 24th for the proportion of women serving in executive positions. Israeli law prohibits discrimination based on gender in employment and wages and provides for class action suits; nonetheless, there are complaints of significant wage disparities between men and women. The OECD reported in 2016 that income disparity between men in women in Israel is particularly high compared with other countries in the OECD. On average, men in Israel make 22 percent more than women, which places Israel among the four OECD (behind Japan, Estonia, and South Korea) with the highest wage inequality between men and women. The OECD average stands at 15 percent.

Waitress in Eilat, 1964.

The government enacted a number of programs to improve the status of women in the work place and society. The Authority for the Advancement of the Status of Women in the Prime Minister's Office grants scholarships for higher education for Druze, Bedouin, and Circassian female students in the country north. The authority holds professional training courses in Arab, Druze, and Circassian localities.

In 2013, Malka Schaps became the first female Haredi dean at an Israeli university when she was appointed dean of Bar Ilan University's Faculty of Exact Sciences.

Also in 2013, Israel’s Chief Rabbinate promised to remove the obstacles preventing women from working as supervisors in the state kosher certification system and Emunah announced the first supervisor certification course for women in Israel.

In 2016 it was announced that the High Court of Justice had given the Justice Ministry 30 days to formulate new regulations to allow women to compete equally with men for the position of director of rabbinical courts.

== Tech, Academia, and Entrepreneurship ==
In the tech field, multiple companies are both founded by women and/or are dedicated to helping women in their studies and careers. One tech company is Shecodes, a tech group founded by Ruth Polachek in 2013 dedicated to helping women and girls learn to code. They consist of many events and programs to help reach their goal of reaching a 50% female population in the software development field. Today, it has more than 50000 participants. Women in Tech Israel (or WMN) founded in 2020, aims to help expand careers, education, and professional networks for women in the STEM field. QueenB is a nonprofit organization launched in 2015 that specializes in helping middle school girls and undergraduate women learn to code, also offering many events to help them build their skills. It currently has more than 5000 members.

When it comes to academics, women make up over 60% of undergraduate and graduate students in Israeli universities, however in nearly half of Israel's universities only 20% of the faculty are women. A few organizations made efforts to help boost representation for women in academia. For example, in 2025, Tel Aviv University launched the Presidential Postdoctoral Fellowship for Women which aimed to shine light upon and show support for female PhD graduates in Israel.

Israeli women make up a small amount of entrepreneurs in Israel, having only 3-5% of start-up founders being female. Though it's a small percentage, there are still notable female entrepreneurs. One such is Eynat Guez, who founded PAPAYA Global in 2016, and became the first company led by women to hit $1B in 2021, and continuing to grow to a total value of $3.7B. Inna Braverman, co-founder of Eco Wave Power, a clean energy company, was the first Israeli wave power company to list publicly in Stockholm. Rakefet Russak-Aminoach, former CEO of Bank Leumi, created a fintech venture group and it is currently a major finance and entrepreneurship company in Israel.

== Women's organizations ==
Na'amat is the largest Israeli women's organization, founded in 1921. It has a membership of 800,000 women, (Jews, Arabs, Druze and Circassians) representing the entire spectrum of Israeli society. The organization has 100 branches in cities, towns and settlements all over the country. It also has sister organizations in other countries whose members are part of the World Labour Zionist Movement and the World Zionist Organization. The Association of Rape Crisis Centers in Israel is a leading organisation in fighting violence against women.

Women's International Zionist Organization (WIZO), is a volunteer organization dedicated to social welfare in all sectors of Israeli society, the advancement of the status of women, and Jewish education in Israel and the Diaspora. WIZO was founded in England on 7 July 1920, and then opened branches throughout Europe and the Americas, and created well-baby clinics and clothing distribution centers in Mandatory Palestine, many still in operation today. WIZO opened the country's first day care center in Tel Aviv in 1926. After the creation of the State of Israel, the organization's headquarters moved from London to Israel.

Emunah - Women's Religious-Nationalist Organization, founded in 1918, promotes religious Zionist-nationalistic education for girls and women, managing day-care centers, religious schools, family counseling centers and more, while promoting women's equality within the religious and social settings.

In 2008, WIZO, Na'amat and Emunah received the Israel Prize for its lifetime achievements and special contribution to society and the State of Israel. Israel Women's Network (IWN) is a feminist non-partisan civil society organization working to advance the status of women in Israel by promoting equality through a range of projects and methods.

=== Feminist organizations ===
Feminist organizations in Israel include the Haifa Women's Coalition, which includes four Haifa-based women's organizations: Isha l'Isha – Haifa Feminist Center, Kayan – Feminist Organization, Haifa Rape Crisis Center and Aswat – Palestinian Gay Women; Coalition of Women for Peace is an Israeli-Palestinian umbrella organization of women's groups that is "a feminist organization against the occupation of Palestine and for a just peace." Women in Black is a nationwide anti-war movement; Ahoti – for Women in Israel is a Mizrahi feminist organization based in Tel Aviv; New Profile is a movement dedicated to turning Israel into a "civilian" (as opposed to "militarized") society; the Jewish Women's Collaborative International Fund promotes women's rights and gender equality.

=== Political action organizations ===
Machsom Watch, or Checkpoint Watch, is a group of Israeli women who monitor and document the conduct of soldiers and policemen at checkpoints in the West Bank.

Women Lawyers for Social Justice promotes the rights of the women from socially and economically marginalized groups. Among its activities: Petition to the High Court for Inclusion of Haredi Women in the Agudat Israel Party, publication of a report on Domestic Violence Against Bedouin Arab Women, petition to repeal a law that negates welfare support in cases of car ownership and more.

We Power (עמותת כ"ן - כוח לנשים) is a non-profit organization dedicated to promoting women to leadership and decision-making roles in Israel.

=== Religious organizations ===
Bat Kol is an organization for orthodox religious lesbians which seeks to educate and promote tolerance and acceptance within religious communities. Women of the Wall is a multi-denominational feminist organization whose goal is to secure the rights of women to pray at the Western Wall, also called the Kotel, in a fashion that includes singing, reading aloud from the Torah and wearing religious garments (tallit, tefillin and kippah). Lo Nivcharot, Lo Bocharot is a Haredi feminist movement launched by Esty Shushan in October 2012, to protest the exclusion of Haredi women from Haredi political parties and from the Haredi public sphere in general.

=== Mizrahi Feminists ===
In the 1990s Mizrahi feminists emerged attempting to combat class-based discrimination. Some of these feminists include Vicki Shiran and Henriette Dahan Kalev. They claim that they are discriminated against not only because they are women, but also because of their Mizrahi heritage. These Mizrahi feminists focus on the differences between Mizrahi and Ashkenazi, that the two groups do not share the same feminist ideas. These discourses led to the development of intersectional feminist groups, inspired by Black Feminism and Postcolonial theory, which challenged other feminist groups claiming there was ethnic-based discrimination within them. At the 1994 Givat Haviva Feminist Conference, Henriette Dahan Kalev, and Mizrahi feminists gathered people for a public protest, where they would fight against their exclusion in the national feminist agenda. As a result of these protests, the Mizrahi feminists changed the Israeli feminist movements to be more inclusive to all ethnicities.

== Notable women ==
Golda Meir was Israel’s Minister of Foreign Affairs for 10 years under David Ben Gurion and Levi Eshkol before becoming herself the 4th Prime Minister of Israel in 1969.

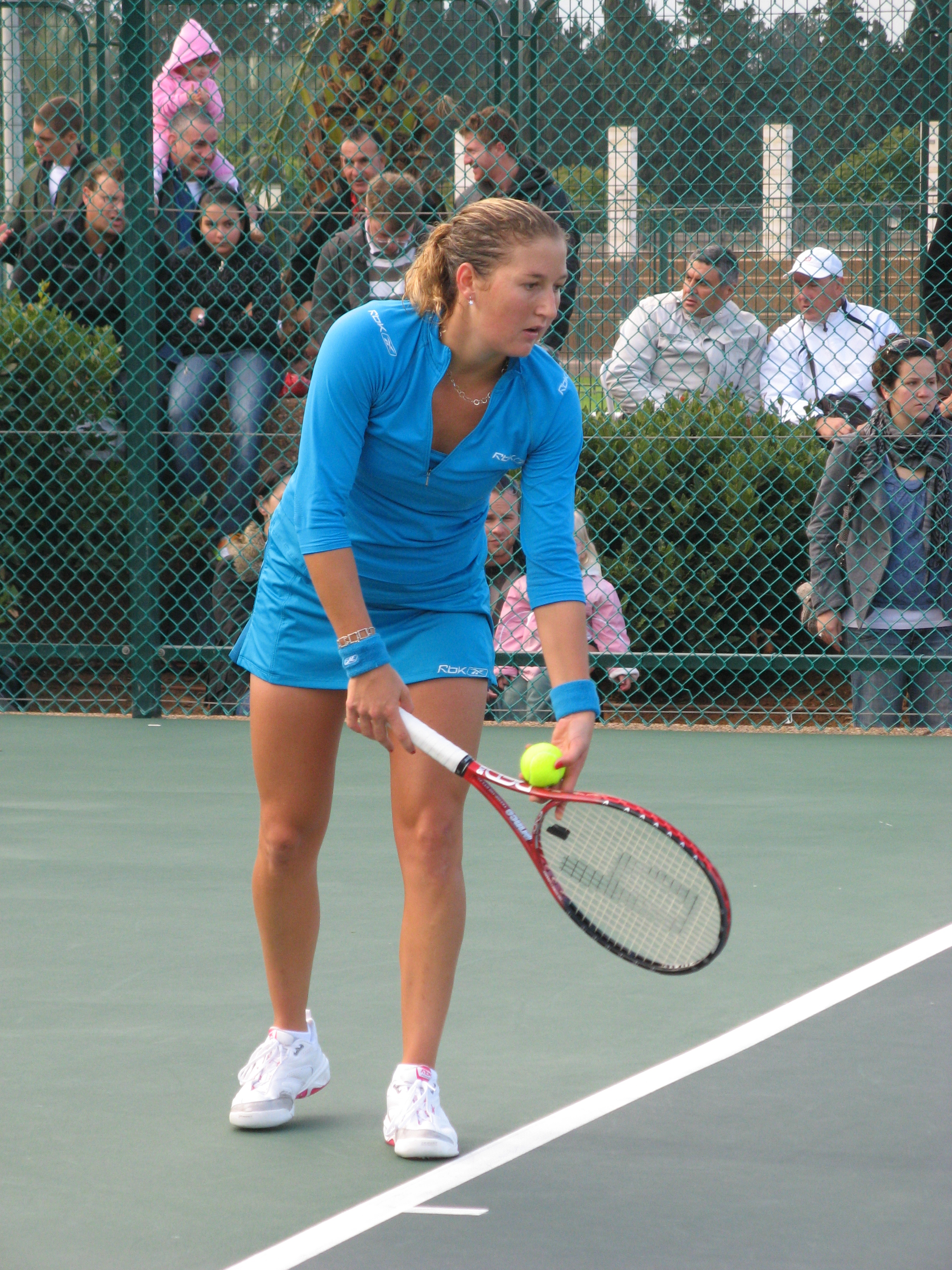
Shahar Pe'er is a retired Israeli professional tennis player, with the highest ever ranking for an Israeli singles tennis player, World No. 11.

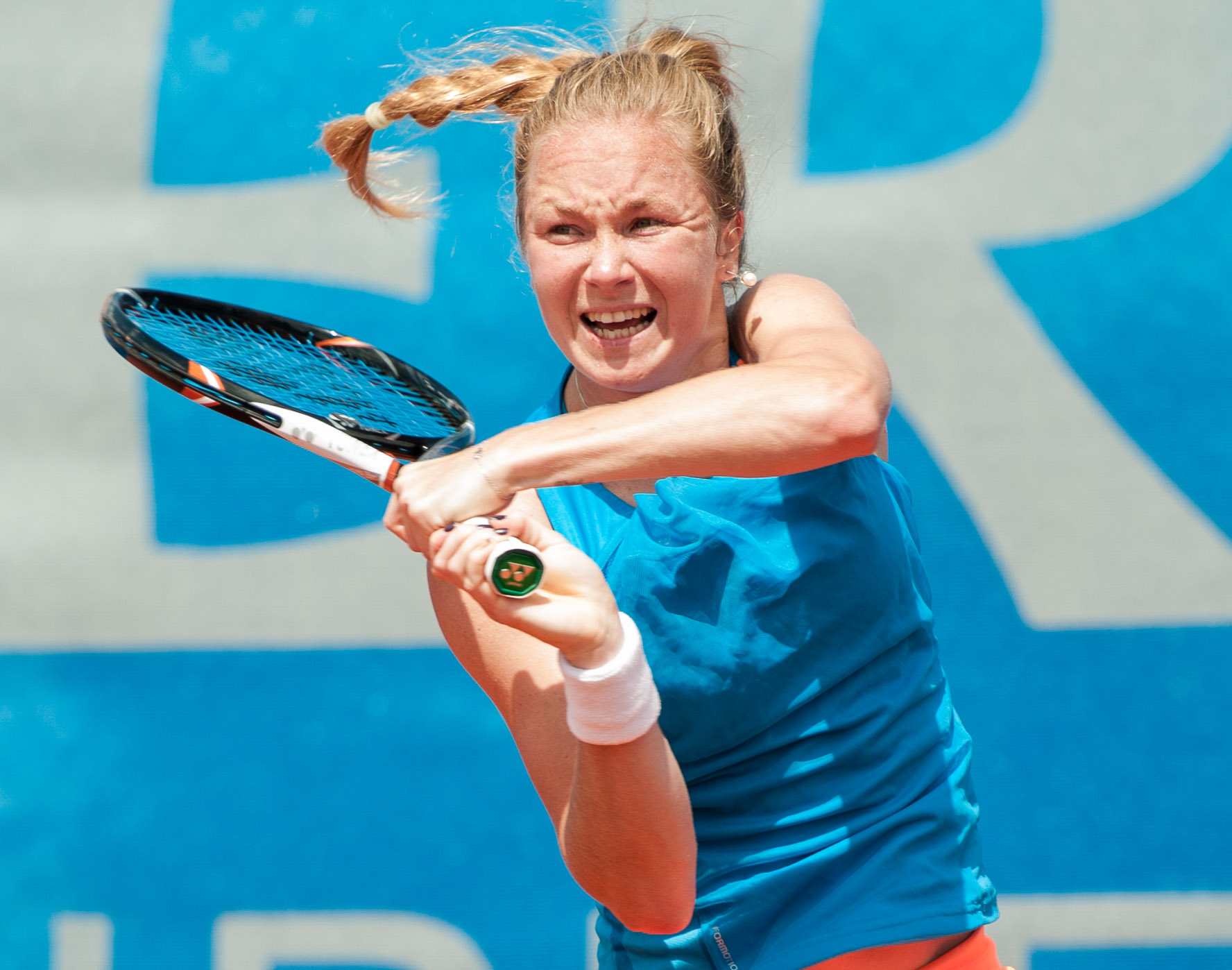
Retired Israeli professional tennis player Julia Glushko, winner of 11 singles and 14 doubles titles titles on the ITF Women's World Tennis Tour circuit.

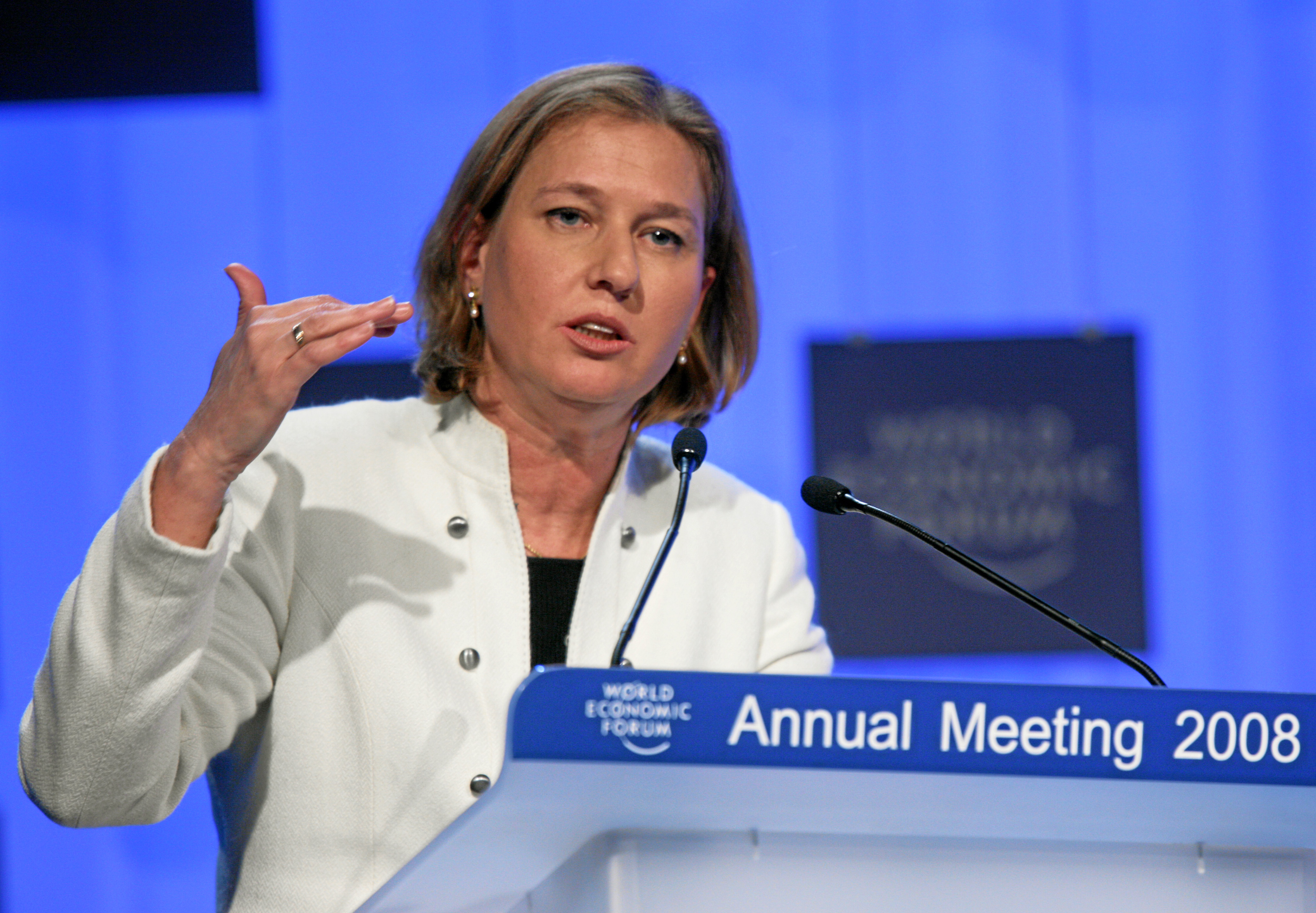
Tzipi Livni, former Israeli Minister of Foreign Affairs, Opposition Leader, leader of Kadima and founder of Hatnuah.

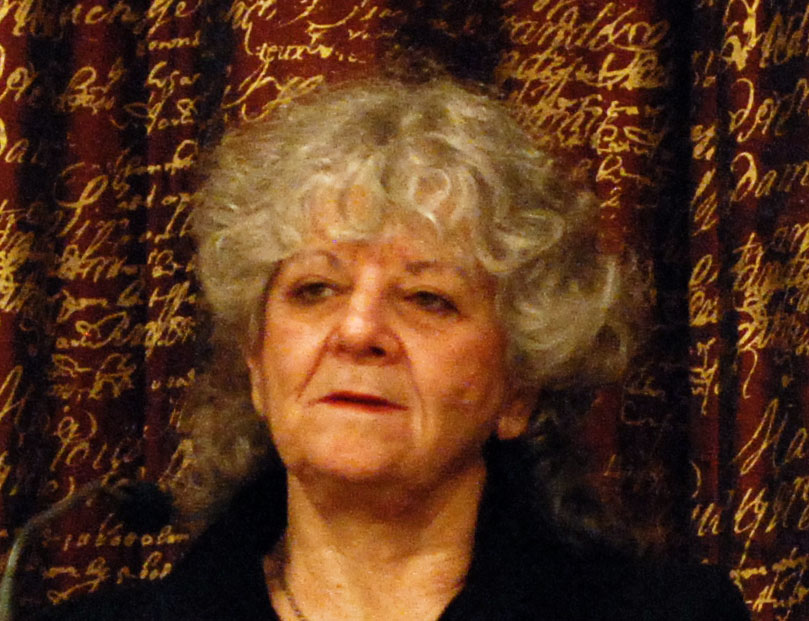
Ada Yonath, a crystallographer, and the first Israeli woman to win the Nobel Prize, for her work on the structure of the ribosome.

== See also ==
- Feminism in Israel
- Sexism in Israel
- Women in Judaism
- Women for Israel's Tomorrow
- Women of the Wall
- Women's Party (Israel)
- Gett: The Trial of Viviane Amsalem
- Israel women's national football team
- Israel women's national volleyball team
- LaIsha
- Women in Asia
