= TechAir =

Israeli airline

TechAir was a proposed Israeli airline initiative announced in 2024, intended to provide flights between Tel Aviv to New York in response to a shortage of international air travel options. It was announced by the High-Tech protest organization in 2024, as a solution to the lack of international flights to and from Israel following the October 7 attacks, and subsequent Gaza war and conflicts between Israel and Hezbollah and Iran. The initiative originally planned to offer three flights per week between Tel Aviv to New York from January to March 2025.

However, TechAir did not develop into an independent operating airline. Rather than operating as a conventional for-profit airline, the initiative was structured as a cooperative, with a commitment to return operational profits to passengers who purchased tickets in advance.

The initiative also sought an exemption from Israel's Air Passenger Protection Law, commonly known as the "Tibi Law", which requires airlines to compensate passengers for certain delays.

TechAir was led by Eynat Guez, CEO of Papaya Global, together with other founders and members of the Israeli high-tech community. The planned New York route eventually operated in cooperation with Arkia in February 2025, rather than through an independent airline established by the TechAir initiative.
