= Headline (company) =

American venture capital firm

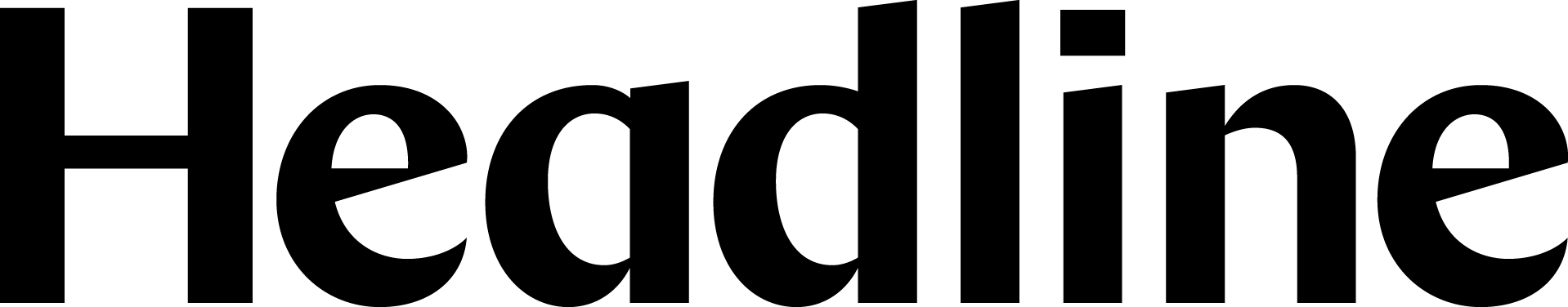
- Industry: Venture capital
- Founded: 1998
- Founder: Mathias Schilling, Thomas Gieselmann
- Headquarters: San Francisco, California, United States
- Website: www.headline.com

Headline, formerly e.ventures and BV Capital, is a global and data-driven venture capital firm investing across stages and sectors, from direct-to-consumer to deep tech and software. It was founded in 1998 in Santa Barbara, California and has since grown to invest in four different regions worldwide: United States, Europe, Asia and Latin America. The firm has its headquarters in San Francisco, California, with additional offices in Berlin and Hamburg, Germany; Paris, France; London, United Kingdom; Tokyo, Japan; Taipei, Taiwan and São Paulo, Brazil.

== History ==
BV Capital was the successor of Bertelsmann Ventures, an internet-focused venture funds in California initiated out of Germany already in 1997. It was founded by Jan Henric Buettner, the former CEO and Wolfgang Rose, the former CTO of AOL Europe and was subsequently established in Santa Barbara, California. Buettner, acting as executive partner for Bertelsmann, had previously built up the multimedia companies CompuTel and Videotel while Rose had worked with leading software companies in Europe.

In 2000, Jan Henric Buettner, alongside Wolfgang Rose, Mathias Schilling, and Thomas Gieselmann, founded BV Capital. This new fund brought together a number of international Limited Partners, in addition to Bertelsmann. Schilling and Gieselmann had already worked with Bertelsmann Ventures and held a Bertelsmann and AOL background respectively. Andreas von Blottnitz, who had collaborated with Buettner at AOL, acted as a Venture Partner with BV Capital.

The new fund moved from Santa Barbara to San Francisco and invested in internet companies, among them GoToMyPC (ExpertCity), which was acquired by Citrix in 2003, or ONElist, which merged with eGroups and got sold to Yahoo. Further investments include Sonos, nCircle, Angie's List, MrTed, Peanutlabs, and Vuze.

The company also established an office in Hamburg, Germany, in 2001 to oversee its investments in Western Europe.

In 2006, Christian Leybold, who had joined the San Francisco team in 2003, moved back to Europe to bring the company to Europe and established an office in Berlin, Germany, together with Andreas Haug. Later the company broadened its focus from the US and Western Europe to include Eastern Europe, Asia and Brazil, with offices opened in Russia and Asia in 2009 and in Brazil in 2012.

Among the investments of its fourth generation of funds are BlueKai (Acquired by Oracle), Citydeal (acquired by Groupon), Grupo Xango, Farfetch, Munchery, Pulse (acquired by LinkedIn), Sapato (acquired by Ozon.ru), Eucalyptus Cloud, NGINX and Deposit Solutions.

In 2012, BV Capital became e.ventures, adopting the same name for all its international branches.

In 2021, e.ventures rebranded to become Headline.

== Portfolio ==
Among Headline's notable investments are:

- Angie's List
- Acorns
- AppFolio
- Azimo
- Betaworks
- Bumble
- delicious
- Farfetch
- goPuff
- Groupon
- Semrush
- sonos
- SpotHero
- Thrive Market
- The RealReal
- YuMe
- Sorare
