= Modesty guard =

Person who enforces modest dress codes

Modesty guards or modesty patrols either request or force citizens, mostly women, to dress modestly, depending on the country and the location.

The definition of modesty is different in each location. In Iran their body and hair has to be covered. Iranian women are also jailed if their clothes are revealing while making a video posted online.

== Islamic religious police ==
Official Islamic vice squad police agencies which enforce religious observance and public morality on behalf of national or regional authorities based on its interpretation of sharia.

=== Afghan Taliban ===
The Ministry for the Propagation of Virtue and the Prevention of Vice is the state agency in charge of implementing Islamic law in the Islamic Emirate of Afghanistan as defined by the ruling Taliban.

=== Iranian ===
Guidance Patrol (Persian: گشت ارشاد, Gašt-e Eršād) is the main Islamic religious police, or vice squad in the Law Enforcement Force of Islamic Republic of Iran, established in 2005. They impose Islamic dress codes and norms of conduct in public, particularly regarding the hijab of women. The Iranian force has even arrested a number of women over videos that were posted on Instagram. In 2018 they arrested 17-year-old gymnast Maedeh Hojabri, over a video of her dancing. The State TV in Iran aired her forced "confession".

In 2016 Tehran's police sent around 7,000 undercover officers to lookout for those who do not follow conservative Islamic modes of dress and behavior. They are called the Gashte Ershad, the "guidance patrol," and they have broad powers to scold and arrest people for failing to meet the modesty test.

=== Palestinian (Hamas) ===
The Committee for the Propagation of Virtue and the Prevention of Vice is a group which is part of the police forces of the Hamas's de facto government in the Palestinian territory of the Gaza Strip.

=== Saudi ===
The Committee for the Promotion of Virtue and the Prevention of Vice is a Saudi government religious authority charged with implementing the Islamic doctrine of hisbah.

== Israeli ==
=== In Haredi communities ===
In Israel, the term mishmeret tzniyut (Hebrew: משמרת צניעות; also tzniyut patrol, modesty squad, chastity squad) refers to an unofficial vigilante gang which acts to enforce a code of modesty among the Haredi (Jewish Ultra-Orthodox) public through violence and intimidation. The conduct of these gangs is illegal under Israeli law. They can be intimidating and even violent. They have torched stores for selling certain electronic equipment. They sometimes hurl stones at women who do not dress according to their strict dress code and have even broken into a woman's house and beat her up, because they did not approve of her behavior.

In 2006, police spokesman Micky Rosenfeld said; "The modesty police are not organized, just rogue enforcers carrying out isolated attacks." But Israel's Justice Ministry used the term modesty patrols in an indictment against a man who assaulted a woman in Jerusalem.

=== Modesty guidelines at government-sponsored events ===
According to an article in The Independent in 2016, "Israel's Culture Ministry is to introduce new rules about how modestly performers should dress at government-sponsored events. 'Festivals and events funded by public money will respect the general public, which includes different communities,' a Culture Ministry spokesperson said. The announcement comes after a singer at a government-backed beach concert near Tel Aviv said she was ordered off stage for wearing a bikini top."

== See also ==
- The Vice and Virtue Ministry, 2005 album by US indie pop band The Happy Bullets
