= Sexism in Israel =

Sexism in Israel manifests differently in different categories of Israeli population and culture.

== Jews ==
Sexism in Jewish population is mainly a byproduct of the traditional role of women in Judaism, especially Orthodox Judaism.

In 2014, Reform Jewish feminist sociologist Elana Maryles Sztokman published a book called The War on Women in Israel describing her perception of the misogyny observed in Israel's public space. According to Publishers Weekly, Sztokman chronicles how the demands of an ultra-Orthodox minority led to the removal of women's imagery and presence from public venues on the pretext of modesty. Her book analyzes sexism in the Israeli army, legislature, and Orthodox rabbinical courts.

According to an editor at Haaretz newspaper, girls and boys are treated differently from preschool. Attending a school party, she claimed that the boys were given Torahs to hold whereas girls were given rimonim adornments of Torah scrolls: "...The girls stood up and followed the instructions: to form an outer circle of decorative objects, in the most literal way imaginable."

At the Western Wall, women have been arrested for carrying a Torah scroll on the grounds that this practice violates the religious status quo of the site.

In Smadar Lavie's Wrapped in the Flag of Israel: Mizrahi Single Mothers and Bureaucratic Torture, Lavie analyzes the racial and gender justice protest movements in the State of Israel from the 2003 Single Mothers’ March to the 2014 New Black Panthers. Lavie equates bureaucratic entanglements with pain—and, arguably, torture—in examining the State's treatment of its non-European Jewish women. Lavie's focus on the often-minimized Mizraḥi women juxtaposed with the state's monolithic Ashkenazi, male-centred culture suggests that Israeli bureaucracy is based on a theological notion that inserts the categories of religion, gender, and race into the foundation of citizenship. Lavie is the first to apply the intersectionality model to the analysis of sexism in Israel and how it is inseparable from racism.

== See also ==
- Gender separation in Judaism
- Women in Israel
- Mishmeret Tzniyut
- Women of the Wall
