= Eynat Guez =

Israeli technology entrepreneur and executive

- עינת גז
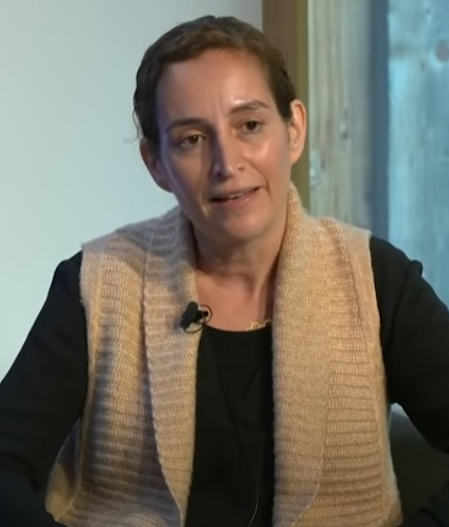
- Speaking at the 2022 World Economic Forum
- Born: 1979 or 1980 (age 45–46); France
- Education: Open University of Israel
- Occupation: Business executive

Eynat Guez (Hebrew: עינת גז; born 1979 or 1980) is an Israeli technology entrepreneur and executive. She is the CEO and co-founder of PAPAYA Global, a payroll and payments provider.

== Biography ==
Eynat Guez was born in France, the second of three children. She immigrated with her family to Israel when she was four years old. The family settled in Netanya. In her youth, she was a journalist for TV shows on Channel 2 and Israeli Educational Television and the newspaper Ma'ariv La'noar, and was a competitive swimmer. She served in the Israel Defense Forces as an F-16 Squadron adjutant.

Guez holds a BA in political science and Business administration from the Open University of Israel. She lives in Emek Hefer with her husband and three children.

== Business career ==
Guez served for seven years as a COO of LR Group, a holding company that built infrastructures and established projects in Africa. In 2008, after seven years in LR Group, she quit her job. Early 2009, she founded Relocation Source, her first company, which supports corporate relocation and worldwide mobility needs and still exists today. Four years later, she established a second company, Expert Source, which assisted companies expanding into East Asia. In 2016, she founded PAPAYA Global, with Ofer Herman (CTO) and Ruben Drong (CPO). As of September 2021, the company is valued at $3.7 billion. It is the first Israeli unicorn led by a woman.

In 2025 she led an investment at a start up company called Era, co founded by Omri Shtivi and her brother, for the memory of his brother, Idan Shtivi, who was kidnapped and murdered by the Hamas during October 7 attacks.

She is a board member at Hagal Shely, an NGO which uses the power of the sea as a therapeutic tool.

== Awards and recognition ==
- 2018 – No. 4 among 20 Women in HR Technology by People Matters.
- 2021 – No. 8 in The Jerusalem Post's 50 most influential Jews.
- 2021 – No. 82 in TheMarker's most influential people.
- 2021 – No. 49 in Calcalist's most influential people.
- 2022 - No. 31 in Forbes Israel's Power Women.
- 2022 – Globes' 50 influential women.
- 2022 – No. 9 on Fortune's The 15 Most Powerful Women in Startups.
- 2022 - Peres Center for Peace & Innovation Medal of Distinction

== See also ==
- Women in Israel
- PAPAYA Global
