= Mishmeret tzniyut =

Religious modesty vigilantes in Israel

Mishmeret tzniyut (Hebrew: משמרת צניעות; also tzniyut patrol, modesty squad, chastity squad) is a self-appointed vigilante gang that operates in Haredi communities to enforce modesty through violence and intimidation.

== History ==
The Israel Police has apprehended members of these patrols on assault charges and in some cases they have been sentenced to prison. Within the Haredi public, both support for and opposition to modesty patrols has been reported. According to Haaretz, some violent incidents attributed to modesty patrols may be linked to the Committee for Preserving Our Camp's Purity, a Haredi organization in Jerusalem headed by Rabbi Yitzhak Meir Shpernovitz. Shpernovitz himself has stated that modesty patrols are a journalistic myth and do not exist.

During the trial of Nechemya Weberman in New York, on charges of child abuse, media sources reported on the communal role played by chasidic “modesty committees” in communities like Williamsburg, Borough Park and Kiryas Joel. These groups were said to have originated years previously, and were set up to guard the “purity” of the community by enforcing strict dress and behavior codes that characterize the insular chasidic lifestyle. But, according to The Jewish Week, 'insiders say, the tactics of these self-appointed, freelance modesty patrols have evolved from public shaming to extortion and threats.'

== Incidents ==
- In June 2008, a modesty patrol in Beitar Illit was suspected of spilling acid on a teenage girl for wearing trousers.
- In August 2008, the Israel State Prosecutor's office indicted seven men, allegedly from a Jerusalem modesty squad, for beating a woman and threatening her with death regarding her relationships with men. The ringleader was charged with conspiracy to commit a crime, aggravated assault, and extortion. In the same month, a man said to be a member of a chastity squad was arrested for alleged involvement in the torching of a store selling MP4 players.
- In February 2012, a 70-year-old haredi woman was attacked and beaten in her home by a modesty patrol who suspected her of being a Christian missionary.

== See also ==
- Sikrikim
- Sharia patrols (London)
- Modesty guard
- Islamic religious police
- Crime in Israel
- Women in Israel
- Sexism in Israel
