= Neve Ur =

Kibbutz in northern Israel

Neve Ur: נווה אור (Hebrew)
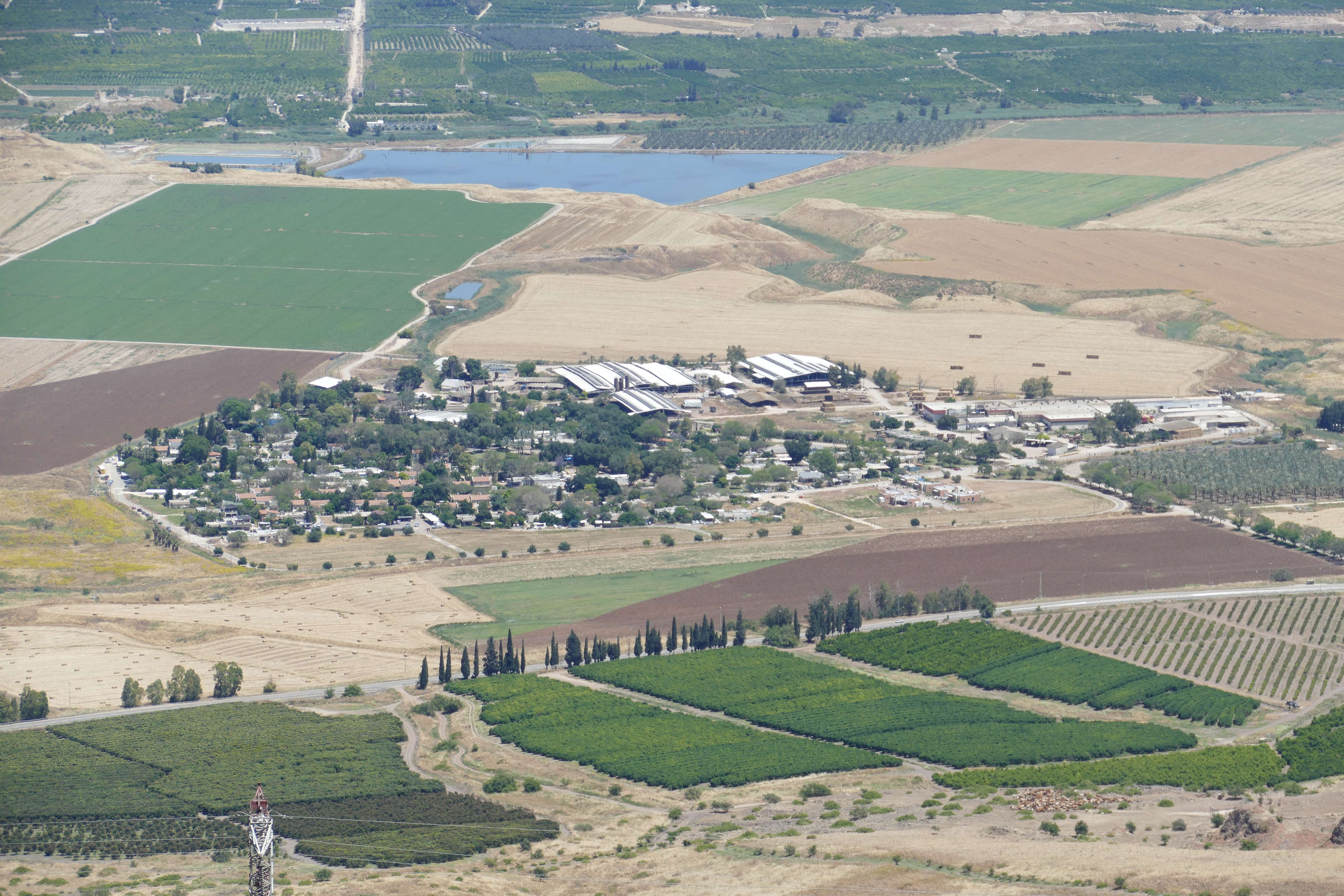
- Etymology: Ur Oasis
- Location within Jezreel Valley region of Israel Location within Israel
- Coordinates: 32°35′24″N 35°33′10″E
- Country: Israel
- District: Northern
- Subdistrict: Jezreel
- Council: Valley of Springs
- Affiliation: Kibbutz Movement
- Founded: 1948
- Founder: Iraqi Jews
- Population (2024): 451
- Website: www.neve-ur.co.il

Neve Ur (Hebrew: נווה אור, lit. 'Ur Oasis') is a kibbutz in northern Israel. Located in the Beit She'an Valley on the Jordan River and to the south of the Sea of Galilee, it falls under the jurisdiction of Valley of Springs Regional Council. In 2024 it had a population of 451.

== Etymology ==
The kibbutz is named after the Biblical town of Ur Kasdim (Ur of the Chaldees) in Mesopotamia, where Abraham lived before he left for the land of Canaan, the future land of Israel (Genesis 11:31).

== Historical and archaeological sites ==
=== Prehistory ===
Mesolithic, including Late Mesolithic Natufian remains were excavated in Neve Ur, as well as Pre-Pottery Neolithic A stone and bone tools.

=== Belvoir Fortress ===
On the west side of Highway 90 and some 500 meters above, overlooking Neve Ur's hillside citrus groves, is the most completely preserved Crusader fortress in Israel, the Belvoir Fortress. Its Hebrew name is Kokhav HaYarden (lit. Star of the Jordan), for the nearby ancient Jewish village of Kokhav (star). (When the castle was restored by the National Parks Authority, they found that many of the stones used in building it had been brought up from a 3rd-century CE synagogue from the Jewish town of Kochav, 700 m. lower down and southeast of the fortress.)

Muslims call it Kaukab al-Hawa (Arabic: lit. Star of the Winds), and the Crusaders named it Belvoir (French: lit. Fair or Beautiful View). The fortress was built overlooking the most important crossings on the river, including Naharayim (lit. Two Rivers)

== History ==
Israel sought to establish a line of security settlements along the Jordan river, from the Sea of Galilee to Beit She'an, in order to protect its borders. Neve Ur was established opposite the Jordan River from the town of Tell esh-Shuneh.

Neve Ur was established in 1948, and first settled in 1949 by immigrants from Iraq, including Shoshana Arbeli-Almozlino. The hardships they faced forced them to abandon the kibbutz. They were replaced by a group of young pioneers and volunteers. In 1952, a group of immigrants from Hungary and HungaryPoland joined the established group in Neve Ur.

As the kibbutz was located near the Jordanian border, it was extremely vulnerable to attacks by Palestinian fedayeen who would cross into Israel from Jordan. During the War of Attrition (1967-70), Neve Ur was hit almost daily by shellings and gunfire, aimed mainly at the workers in the fields. In April 1991, a group of Hamas militants penetrated the defences of the kibbutz and killed one member who was working in the orchard, and wounded three others.

== Geography ==
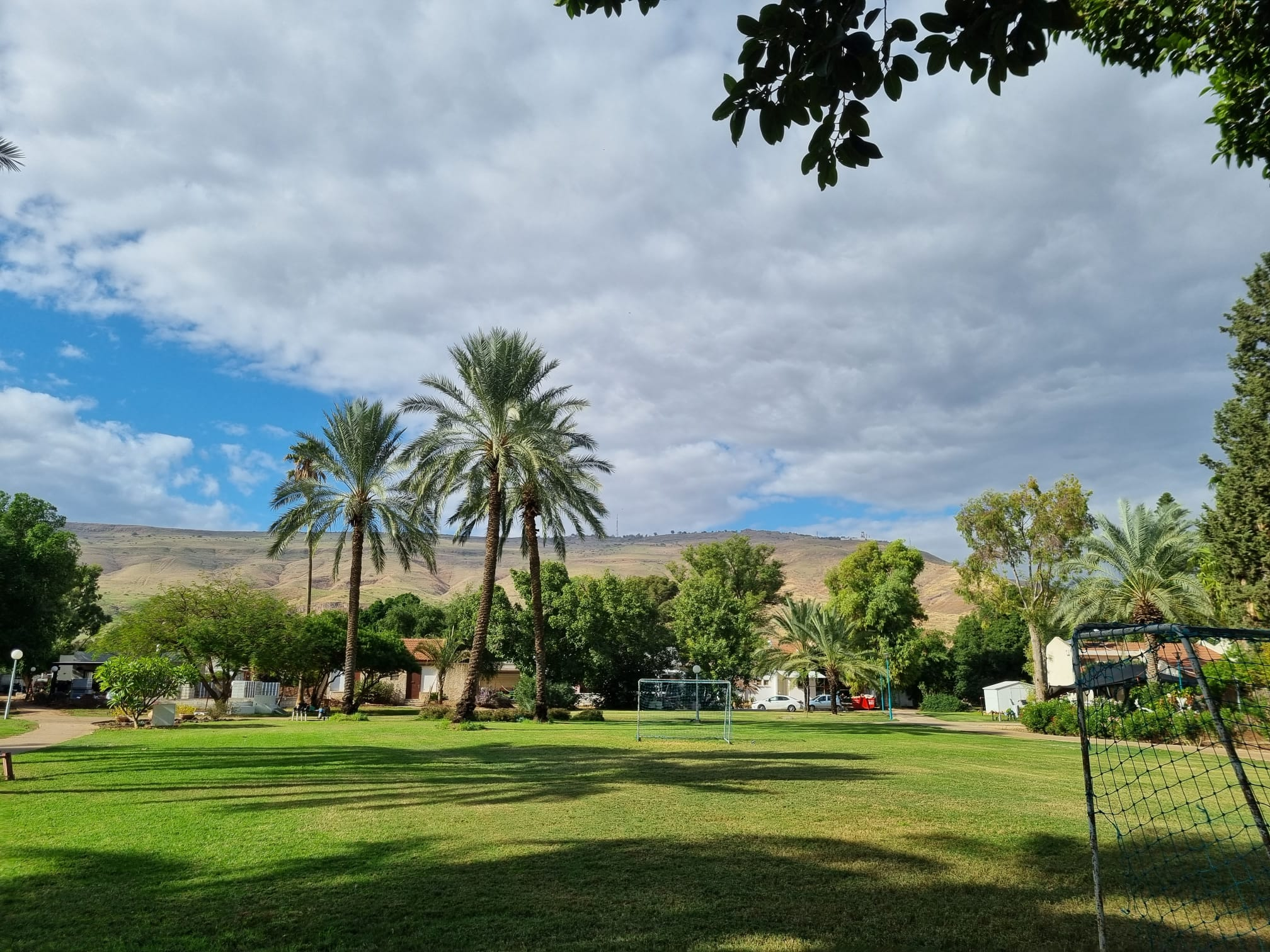
Park in Neve Ur

Neve Ur is located in the northern Jordan Valley in the Beit She'an region approximately 10 km north of the town of Beit She'an, and 15 km south of the Sea of Galilee.

Highway 90 runs through the Beit She'an Valley past Neve Ur. The kibbutz stands east of the road.

== Economy ==
External videos
- Date Production - Neve Ur Kibbutz, Israel

The kibbutz primarily grows citrus fruits, including pomelo, lemon, orange, red grapefruit, and raises chickens and turkeys. The kibbutz is also known for its large dairy production, and fish ponds.

Like many kibbutzim, Neve Ur has welcomed volunteer workers from around the world, who provide additional help at harvest time, and also added to the workforce in the refet (dairy), chicken and turkey houses.

The collapse of a viable future for kibbutzim as agricultural communities meant that kibbutzim, like Neve Ur, had to turn to small industry as the means to avoid economic collapse. The Israel government, which had provided tax breaks to the agricultural communities, and which owned much of the land occupied by the kibbutzim, had to rewrite the definition of a kibbutz in order to support the shift from farming to industry and outside employment.

With the economic upheaval suffered across the Kibbutz Movement, Neve Ur entered the industrial market, founding an aluminum, magnesium and zinc casting foundry.

Industries in the kibbutz include agriculture, fish ponds, dairy farming and a casting foundry for the automotive industry.

== Notable people ==
- Egor Koulechov (born 1994), Israeli-Russian professional basketball player for Ironi Nahariya
- Lee Zeitouni (1986–2011), manslaughter (hit and run) victim
