= Azimo =

Dutch money transfer company

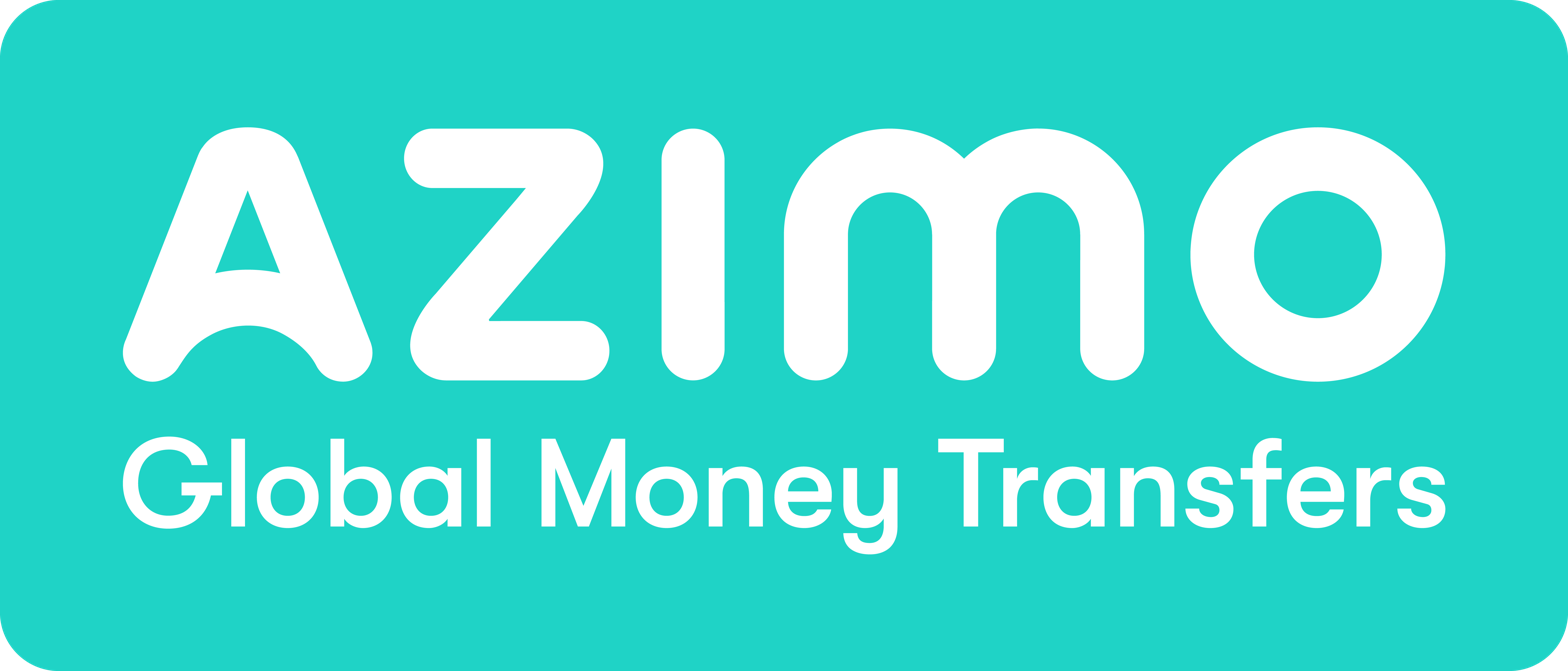
- Type: Private
- Industry: Financial technology
- Founded: 2012; 14 years ago
- Founders: Michael Kent, Marta Krupinska, Ricky Knox, Marek Wawro
- Defunct: August 1, 2023
- Fate: Acquired by PAPAYA Global
- Headquarters: Amsterdam, Netherlands
- Area served: Europe (sending); worldwide (receiving)
- Key people: Michael Kent (Founder, EC); Richard Ambrose (CEO)
- Services: Money transfer
- Website: azimo.fr

Azimo B.V. was an online remittance service headquartered in Amsterdam, Netherlands. It also had offices in Kraków, Poland.

Azimo offered money transfers to 190 receiving countries in over 80 different currencies. The company had half a million customers connected to its platform and offered more than 270,000 cash pick-up locations globally. As of October 2019, sending countries were limited to Europe.

In March 2022, Azimo was acquired by the New York–based payroll and payments solutions provider, Papaya Global, incorporating its licensed payment services to support global transactions.

== History ==
Azimo was founded in October 2012 in London, United Kingdom, and initially operated as a direct-to-consumer money transfer service, allowing customers to send money across borders.

In 2012 and 2015, Azimo raised significant funding, including $31 million in Series A and B funding from investors including Frog Capital, Greycroft, MCI.TechVentures, e.ventures, and Quona Capital.

In 2016, an updated version of its app was launched with features including in-app chat and biometric security.

As of early 2016, Azimo had raised $31 million in Series A and B funding from investors including Frog Capital, Greycroft, MCI.TechVentures, e.ventures and Quona Capital. In May 2016, Japanese e-commerce company Rakuten invested in Azimo to accelerate the company's expansion into Asia.

In 2020, Azimo moved to the Netherlands as a result of Brexit, while its development office was in Kraków, Poland.

=== Acquisition and current operations ===
In March 2022, Azimo was acquired by Papaya Global, a global workforce management platform. The acquisition marked a shift in Azimo's business model, from a direct-to-consumer money transfer service to the licensed payments arm of Papaya Global. In August 2022, the company discontinued its consumer money transfer services.

== Operations ==
Azimo offered money transfers to 190 receiving countries in over 80 different currencies. The company had half a million customers connected to its platform and offers more than 270,000 cash pick-up locations globally. In 2016, an updated version of its app was launched with features including in-app chat and biometric security.

As of October 2019, sending countries were limited to Europe that are primarily in the EU. The list of sending countries was:

- Austria
- Belgium
- Cyprus
- Denmark
- Estonia
- Finland
- France
- Germany
- Greece
- Ireland
- Italy
- Latvia
- Lithuania
- Luxembourg
- Malta
- Netherlands
- Norway
- Poland
- Portugal
- Slovakia
- Slovenia
- Spain
- Sweden
- Switzerland
- United Kingdom

As part of Papaya Global, Azimo now provides the regulatory and technical infrastructure for workforce-related payments. The company holds licenses in five top-tier jurisdictions, including the UK and European Economic Area (EEA), enabling Papaya Global to offer compliant payment services across multiple territories.

Following the acquisition of Azimo, Papaya Global integrated Azimo's payment infrastructure and licenses to create a comprehensive global workforce payments solution. This integration enabled Papaya Global to become a payment solution specifically designed for workforce-related payments including net salaries, contractor payments, local tax authorities, vendors, etc.
