= Women in governments of Israel =

Since the founding of the State of Israel, relatively few women have served in the Israeli government, and fewer still have served in the leading ministerial offices. While Israel is one of a small number of countries where a woman—Golda Meir—has served as Prime Minister, it is behind most Western countries in the representation of women in both the parliament and government.

As of 2019, women comprise 25% of Israel's 120-member Knesset. For comparison, the female ratio in the Arab world is 18.7%, in Europe the average is 26.5% and in Scandinavia 42.3%. In the United States of America, women comprise 19.3% of the House of Representatives. Female representation varies significantly by demographics: most female politicians have represented secular parties, while very few have come from Arab or religious Jewish parties. While Labor's quota for female representatives on party lists has traditionally meant that most female representatives came from that party, since 2000 the role of women in other parties has also grown.

Gender roles tend to influence both the positions which women in government receive and the bills which female representatives introduce. Due to the religious nature of the state, traditional gender roles, and political selection processes female politicians face different obstacles on their path to government than their male counterparts.

== List of Female Israeli Ministers ==
The list is updated to 2023.

Portfolio	Name	Dates in office
Prime Minister	Golda Meir	1969–1974
Vice Prime Minister	Tzipi Livni	2006–2009
Foreign Minister	Golda Meir	1956–1966
Foreign Minister	Tzipi Livni	2006–2009
Minister of Internal Affairs	Golda Meir	1970
Justice Minister	Tzipi Livni	2004–2006, 2013–2014
Justice Minister	Ayelet Shaked	2015–2019
Education Minister	Shulamit Aloni	1992–1993
Education Minister	Yuli Tamir	2006–2009
Minister of Industry and Trade	Dalia Itzik	2001–2002
Labour Minister	Golda Meir	1949–1956
Labour Minister	Ora Namir	1992–1996
Health Minister	Shoshana Arbeli-Almozlino	1986–1988
Health Minister	Yael German	2013–2014
Minister of Transportation and Road Safety	Miri Regev	2020–2021, Since 2023
Minister of Housing and Construction	Tzipi Livni	2004–2005
Minister of Housing and Construction	Yifat Shasha-Biton	2019–2020
Minister of Tourism	Ruhama Avraham	2008–2009
Minister of Tourism	Orit Farkash-Hacohen	2020–2022
Communications Minister	Shulamit Aloni	1993–1996
Communications Minister	Limor Livnat	1996–1999
Communications Minister	Dalia Itzik	2005
Minister of Agriculture and Rural Development	Tzipi Livni	2002–2003
Minister of Agriculture and Rural Development	Orit Noked	2011–2013
Minister of Environmental Protection	Ora Namir	1992
Minister of Environmental Protection	Yehudit Naot	2003–2004
Minister of Environmental Protection	Dalia Itzik	1999–2001
Minister of Environmental Protection	Gila Gamliel	2020–2021
Minister of Environmental Protection	Idit Silman	Since 2023
Minister of Strategic Affairs	Orit Farkash-Hacohen	2020–2022
Minister of Aliyah and Absorption	Yuli Tamir	1991–2001
Minister of Aliyah and Absorption	Tzipi Livni	2003–2006
Minister of Aliyah and Absorption	Sofa Landver	2009–2005, 2016–2018
Minister of Aliyah and Absorption	Pnina Tamano-Shata	2020–2022
Minister of Culture	Limor Livnat	2009–2015
Minister of Culture	Miri Regev	2015–2020
Minister for Social Equality	Gila Gamliel	2015–2020
Minister for Social Equality	Meirav Cohen	2020–2022
Minister of Diaspora Affairs	Tzipi Hotovely	2020
Minister of Diaspora Affairs	Omer Yankelevich	2020–2021
Minister for Community Empowerment and Advancement	Orly Levy-Abekasis	2020–2022
Minister of Settlement	Tzipi Hotovely	2020
Minister Without Portfolio in the Prime Minister's Office	May Golan	Since 2023
Minister of Information	Galit Distel-Atbaryan	Since 2023
Minister of Intelligence	Gila Gamliel	Since 2023
Minister of National Missions	Orit Strook	Since 2023

== Women in the leading jobs in the government ==
Golda Meir is the only woman to serve as the Prime Minister of Israel. She was chosen for the job just before the 1969 elections following the death of Levi Eshkol, and ended her job in 1974. Until 1974, Meir was also the only woman to serve as a member of any cabinet. She and Tzipi Livni are the only women who served as Foreign Affairs Ministers, Meir having served in the job for 10 years—from 1956 to 1966. Livni is the only woman to serve in the second most important job in the Israeli government, Vice Prime Minister.

Once Golda Meir resigned in 1974, it was another 12 years until another woman was appointed as a minister with a portfolio, when Shoshana Arbeli-Almozlino was appointed Health Minister, and 18 years until a woman was appointed to any other portfolio, Education Minister.

After Golda Meir, the leading jobs which women held are as follows: Education Minister for a total of 9 years (5 of them by Limor Livnat, 3 years by Yuli Tamir and 1 year by Shulamit Aloni), and Minister of Communications, also for a total of 7 years (6 years by Shulamit Aloni and Limor Livnat, and 1 year by Dalia Itzik). Tzipi Livni was acting Minister of Justice for a month, and then Minister of Justice for almost a year and a half. Ayelet Shaked was appointed as Minister of Justice in 2015.

Although a few women did succeed in reaching the leading posts in the Israeli government, a number of them hadn't ever been held by women, such as Defense Minister, Internal Security Minister, Finance Minister. As of 2013, there had only been 14 female ministers in any position. Further, throughout Israel's history there has never been a female president. Colette Avita was considered to have the potential to be elected to the position in 2007, but she failed to gain the votes to beat her opponents Shimon Peres and Reuven Rivlin.

== Influence of gender roles on female representatives ==
While in the Knesset and government, women have been shown to introduce bills and to work on issue areas that are different from their male colleagues. A study conducted by Reut Itzkovitch-Malka and Chen Friedberg found a gender division in the bills introduced, with bills proposed by women more often centered on issues involving the family or women's rights as opposed to defense and national security, areas in which women tend to be less involved than their male counterparts. Itzkovitch-Malka and Friedberg state that this divide may exist because women are excluded from these issues and pushed toward issues more suited to traditional gender roles, or because women in government and the Knesset attempt to use these traditional roles to gain influence in areas of interest for their constituents. Additionally, in the governments themselves, women have often been appointed as cabinet ministers in positions that follow the ideology of traditional female roles. The ministries of Education and Communications have both been led by female ministers, and are seen as an area in which it is more acceptable for women to participate and a ministry of secondary importance respectively.

Women who wish to be representatives or play other public roles are also constrained by the religious nature of the State of Israel. Religious traditions dictate that women should have limited roles in the public sphere, thus women who wish to be elected face a different set of obstacles than their male counterparts, especially if they are running as part of a religious party. For example, when Aliza Bloch was running for mayor of Beit Shemesh in 2018, she refrained from using images of herself on campaign posters in order to avoid alienating religious voters. Bloch won this election, but only due to a unique coalition of support including secular, orthodox and ultra-Orthodox voters along with soldiers from the area. Bloch's efforts to avoid alienation of the religious vote point to the problems specific to female politicians.

== Quotas and political selection processes ==
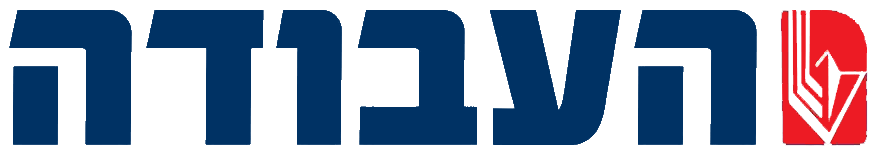
Prior to 2000, most female Knesset members came from the Labor Party.

The Labor party has a 20 percent quota on the number of women it puts on its list, while other parties such as the Likud do not have formal quotas and do not ensure places for women on electoral lists. Before 1989, the common practice in the Labor party was that a woman had to be included in the first five people on a list, and another had to be included within the first ten people. The effects of this quota and policy are disputed. First, the quota is potentially the reason why most of the female representatives in the Knesset were from the Labor party prior to the 2000s. Over time the proportion of women in the Knesset from the Labor party has declined while representation from other parties has increased. Herzog argues that this minimum quota is not only very low compared to population, but also that once it is met there is little incentive for more women to be included on the list of candidates. Further, Herzog contends that this quota causes women to compete with each other over these limited spots, rather than fighting for inclusion on the list. Despite disagreements over the efficacy of the quota system in promoting the representation of women on party lists, organized processes of candidate selection benefit women more than processes of selection which are less explicitly defined. This is because men tend to have larger political networks than women, and thus can influence the selection process when it is less formalized.

== Historical overview ==
=== Until the 1970s ===
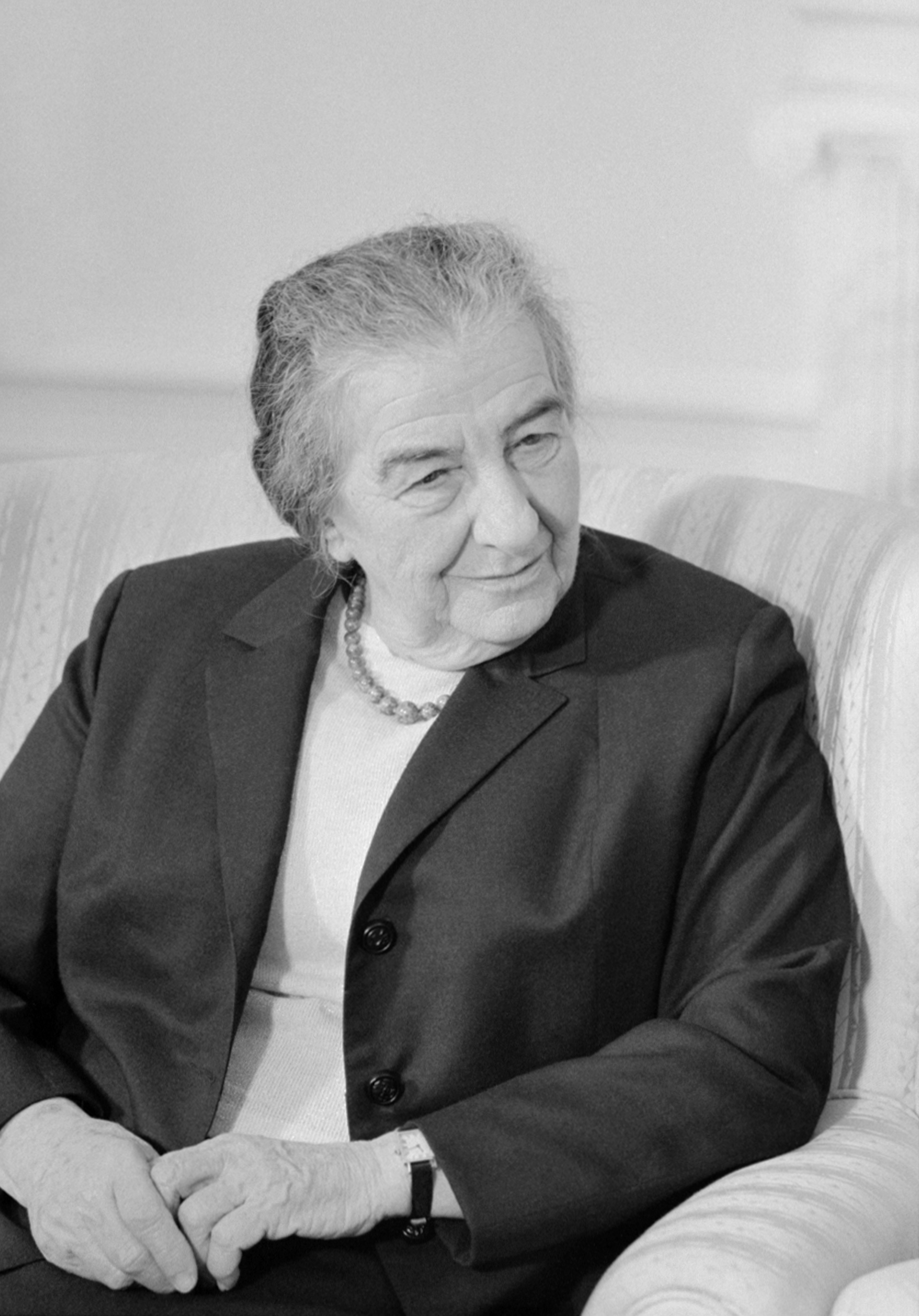
Golda Meir, at a meeting in the White House, 1973

During the Yishuv period, women encountered many obstacles when attempting to gain entrance into the National Council, which was the effective government at the time. The presence of women in the National Council was contested by many in the ultra-Orthodox camp, who did not believe that women should have the ability to vote, let alone serve in positions of authority. Although one woman, Rahel Yanait Ben-Zvi, was eventually allowed to participate in the first National Council of 1920. However, she was not allowed to be an equal representative, and was only given the status of a deputy. Despite her lesser status and the continuous resistance of the ultra-Orthodox, Rahel Yanait Ben-Zvi played an important role on the council.

In much of the Yishuv period, the number of female representatives on the National Council remained small, and no women were chosen to be a part of any executive committee until Henrietta Szold in 1931. The next time a woman served on one of these executive committees did not occur until Rachel Cohen-Hagen was elected in 1947.

From the first Israeli government until the 12th, Golda Meir was the only woman in the Israeli government (though not the parliament). Golda Meir, who started out as a secretary of the Women's Labour Council of Histadrut, and later became the head of the Jewish Agency for Israel's political department, and then an ambassador to the Soviet Union, came back to Israel in 1949 after she was elected to the Knesset, and served as the Israeli Minister of Labor. She held this job for 7 years under a number of Prime Ministers until 1956, when she became Foreign Minister, a job she held for 10 years until 1966.

After 3 years in which she wasn't a member of the Israeli government, she was chosen as the head the Alignment party and as Prime Minister, and being elected again in the 1969 elections, when the party got the highest number of seats in the Knesset. Despite being a woman, she wasn't known as a feminist, and she didn't appoint any other women to positions in the government.

During Golda Meir's time, the number of woman members of Knesset was around 10–14 on average (out of 120), mostly from Mapai and its successor parties. In the elections during which Golda Meir was to become prime minister, only 8 women got into the Knesset.

The fact that Golda Meir was able to obtain high positions within the Israeli government is cited as an example of how women in Israel have opportunities to rise in politics. However, Herzog argues that the fact that Meir has been the only female prime minister, and one of only a few women to rise to a high political position in the government indicates that her time in office did not represent a broader trend in increasing equality.

=== The 1970s ===
After the 1973 elections, Golda Meir resigned from her position as prime minister as the result of protests after the Yom Kippur War, and Yitzhak Rabin was chosen to succeed her. In 1974, he appointed Shulamit Aloni as a minister without portfolio. She held this position for 5 months, until she resigned in protest over the appointment of Yitzhak Rafael as the Religious Services Minister, despite the fact that he was suspected of having accepted bribes. Following Aloni's resignation in 1977 the government contained no female members for the rest of the decade. This situation ended in 1983 when Sarah Doron joined the government. Doron served as a minister without portfolio.

=== After the 1970s ===
==== Israel's twelfth Knesset ====
The Knesset formed in the 1988 election was notable for the decided decline in the number of women elected as representatives. There were seven women out of the one hundred and twenty Knesset members in this era. Due to the strong influence of religious parties in this Knesset, when female parliamentarians did advocate for issues involving women's rights they were often ignored. Additionally, the drive to capture the religious votes caused Labor and Likud to take a step back from positions supporting women's rights. Furthermore, the newly formed government contained no women at all. Although no women occupied a position in the government itself, Shoshana Arbeli-Almozlino of the Labor party was selected to be the chairperson of the Economics Committee. While this was partially taken as proof of women's advancement, it only occurred after much protest around the fact that no women were included in the government. For this reason, her selection is often seen as a strategic move to soften the lack of women's inclusion in the government.

==== 1990s to present ====
From the founding of the Knesset until 1992, the number of female representatives in the Israeli Knesset decreased, with the low point following the 1988 election of the twentieth Knesset. The 1992 election saw not only an increase in the number of female representatives elected to the Knesset, but also a shift away from female parliamentarians who tended to put party support above advocating for specific issues. Additionally, many of the women elected in the 1992 election were self-avowed feminists.

In 1992, the Committee for the Advancement of the Status of Women was inaugurated. This committee, which sought to create policy regarding the role and treatment of women in society, has generally had a higher percentage of female members and leaders compared to other committees. Many of the women on the committee held feminist views, although power was shared with those who had more conservative views. The committee members with more conservative views were generally members of religious parties. Although the committee has had to face ideological disagreement among some of its members, it has had numerous achievements in promoting laws against discrimination, and protecting the rights of women and other minority groups. Further, a report by the United Nations noted the importance of the committee in forming networks between women in government, NGOs, and women who work in education, research and other professions.

The 2000s have seen a shift in the representation of women in the Knesset. Although the trend after 1999 has been one of increasing representation for women in the Knesset, this representation has largely come from parties on the left side of the political spectrum. After 2003, this representation expanded to other political parties. At the same time, women still have not been able to run for Knesset membership in some religious and Arab parties.

Due to the rejection of female candidates by ultra-Orthodox parties, In 2015 the first Israeli political party dedicated to ultra-Orthodox women was unveiled, called "B’Zhutan: Haredi Women Making Change." Led by Ruth Colian, the party hopes to bridge the gap in representation of issues relating to women in the Haredi community, while still maintaining an ultra-Orthodox, religious perspective.

===== The thirty-fourth government =====
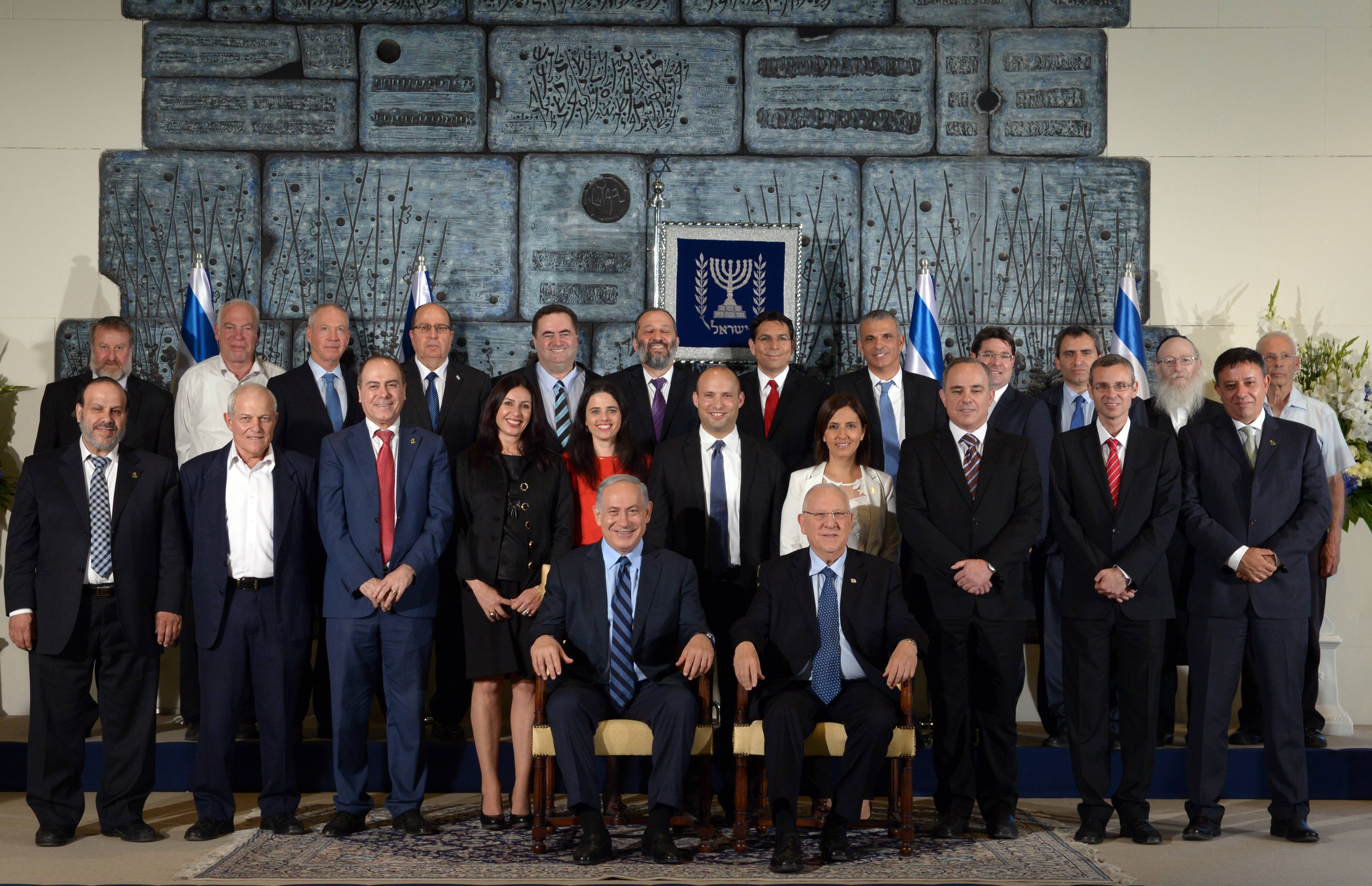
Israel's Thirty-fourth government

Ayelet Shaked, Miri Regev, and Gila Gamliel were appointed as cabinet ministers when the thirty-fourth government formed in 2015. Ayelet Shaked of The Jewish Home was appointed Minister of Justice, while Gila Gamliel and Miri Regev of the Likud were appointed Minister for Social Equality and Minister of Culture and Sport respectively, and Tzipi Hotovely was appointed Minister in the Ministry of Foreign Affairs. in 2016, Sofa Landver was appointed Minister of Immigration Absorption.Most recently, in 2019 Yifat Shasha-Biton became Minister of Construction and Housing.

Ayelet Shaked, as a member of the Jewish Home party, has advocated a far right ideology in her role as Minister of Justice. As the Minister of Justice, Shaked also leads the committee charged with filling court vacancies. This has been a frequent task for Shaked, due to high turnover as judges retire. Shaked, who has expressed the belief that the courts of Israel carry out a left-wing ideology, has been firm in pushing candidates whose views are more conservative. Additionally, she has attempted to pass measures that limit the power of the supreme court. Shaked has been successful at building support, which caused speculation that she could replace Netanyahu as Prime Minister after the April 2019 election. This speculation turned out to be unfounded, as Netanyahu remained Prime Minister following the election.

===== The thirty-fifth government =====
Following several inconclusive elections, Netanyahu had the responsibility of forming a new government. The government formed in 2020 and included eight female ministers, including Regev, Sasha-Biton and Gamliel.

== See also ==
- List of female cabinet ministers of Israel
