= Lee Zeitouni affair =

2011 criminal case

Lee Zeitouni
- Born: Lee Zeitouni; April 25, 1986; Kibbutz Neve Ur, Israel
- Died: September 16, 2011 (aged 25); Tel Aviv
- Cause of death: Car crash
- Resting place: Kibbutz Neve Ur
- Occupation: Pilates instructor

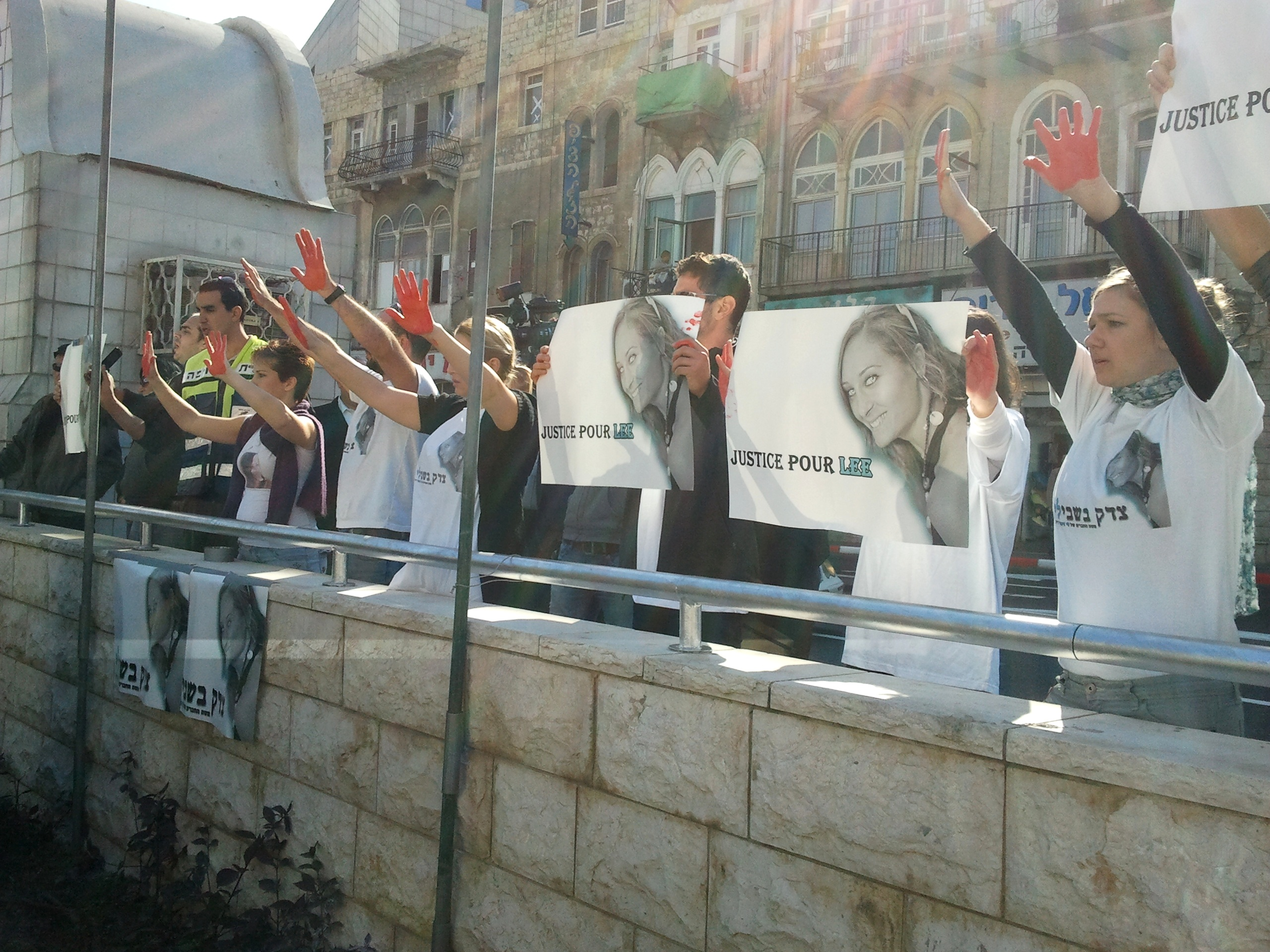
Demonstration in Haifa

Lee Zeitouni (Hebrew: לי זיתוני; April 25, 1986–September 16, 2011) was an Israeli Pilates instructor, born in Kibbutz Neve Ur in northern Israel. At the age of 25, she was struck and killed by two French nationals, Claude Khayat and Eric Robic, who were driving a black BMW sports utility vehicle on September 16, 2011, in Tel Aviv. The two left the accident scene and fled to France to avoid criminal prosecution.

The Israeli and French authorities were in close communication with each other on how to proceed, as the French law of extradition, like Israel's, does not allow extradition of nationals, except to countries of the European Union, to bring them to justice.

In July 2012, after an official complaint from the Zeitouni family, France launched a criminal investigation into the death of Lee Zeitouni that led to Khayat and Robic being charged for homicide, failure to assist a person in danger and unlawful escape to avoid responsibility.

In December 2014, Eric Robic, the driver of the car that hit Zeitouni, was found guilty of manslaughter and sentenced to 5 years in prison. Passenger Claude Khayat was found guilty of deliberately failing to provide assistance to a person in danger and was sentenced to 15 months.

On April 16, 2026, Eric Robic, the driver who ran her over, was killed in a shooting assassination in the wealthy suburb Neuilly-sur-Seine, France. Previously, in 2024, he was convicted of running a million-euro international fraud operation.

== Early life ==
Lee Zeitouni was born in Kibbutz Neve Ur in 1986, and was the sibling of two brothers and a sister. At the time of her death, Zeitouni was a Pilates instructor.

== Death ==
On September 16, 2011, Zeitouni was heading to a gym to teach a class when a black BMW sports utility vehicle with two occupants struck her on Pinkhas Street at 6:45 a.m. The impact sent Zeitouni flying onto the oncoming lane, where a second vehicle struck and instantly killed her. The two French nationals in the BMW, Eric Robic, 37, a businessman who frequently spends time in Israel, and Claude Khayat (who has dual French-Israeli nationality), a neighbor and close friend of Robic, escaped the scene and drove through red lights. They hid the car in the parking lot of the building they lived in on Maze Street in Tel Aviv, and fled the country.

Thousands of people gathered for Zeitouni's funeral in her hometown of Kibbutz Neve Ur on September 18, 2011.

== Investigation ==
Police officials conducted a nationwide search, and traced the vehicle to Eric Robic. Police discovered his apartment to be empty, since he quickly escaped to France together with Khayat. Detectives determined that Robic and Khayat had been drinking in Tel Aviv and Ramat Gan, and left a bar at around 6 A.M. on the day that Zeitouni was killed.

Soon after, Israeli police asked Interpol for assistance in bringing the French tourists into custody, and an international arrest warrant was issued for Robic and Khayat.

=== Statements by suspects ===
In an interview with an Israeli television channel on September 22, 2011, Khayat said, “We want to be in Israel, to go to the family and explain how much it hurts us too. But what can we do today? We killed a Jewish woman who was 25. For us this is the end of the world... We didn’t see her at all. If I would have seen her, I would have pressed on the brakes. But I saw her only when she was hit."

On October 23, 2011, Khayat and Robic stated that they spoke to an Israeli attorney who specializes in traffic accidents, and requested that the attorney begin discussions with state prosecutors to explore their options for a plea bargain or a specific sentence.

In December 2011, the two suspects stated that they do not plan to return to Israel to face justice, but are determined to stay in France. One of their lawyers stated that it was possible that the Israeli authorities would allow the trial to take place in France, but stated that there was still a "power struggle" between the French and Israeli authorities at the moment.

=== Speeding by suspect ===
In late December 2011, Claude Khayat was caught driving at a speed of 156 kilometers per hour (nearly 100 mph) in France, and was released immediately after paying a fine for speeding. Zeitouni's boyfriend said "The fact that Claude Khayat was caught speeding in his new Audi A8 proves that France has become a sanctuary for fugitives... We expect the authorities in Israel to have them extradited and bring them to justice."

=== Israel-France Cooperation ===
On September 18, a short while after the incident, Israel's State Attorney's Office announced that the authorities were communicating with their French counterparts regarding Zeitouni and the French tourists involved in the hit-and-run. Because Israel and France do not have an extradition treaty, French laws make it difficult, if not impossible, to bring the two French tourists to Israel for trial unless they agree voluntarily. According to the French prosecutor in the case, "French law does not allow the extradition of French citizens – there are no exceptions." If the two were convicted in France, they would face a minimal sentence, with a maximum of 10 years as opposed to 14 years in Israel.

On September 21, 2011, Christophe Bigot, the French ambassador to Israel, visited Zeitouni's family, who demanded that he would act to extradite Robic and Khayat to Israel for a trial. Bigot responded that the French "will make an effort to return the two boys to Israel." Bigot confirmed that there was close cooperation between the Israeli and French law enforcement officials, and that both Israel and France were dedicated to bringing the suspects to justice. On the same day, approximately 200 protestors outside the French embassy in Tel Aviv demanded that Robic and Khayat would be extradited to Israel.

In late December 2011, Carla Bruni, the wife of then French President Nicolas Sarkozy, wrote a personal letter to Zeitouni's mother, Kate, in which she shared her condolences and sorrow. Bruni stated that France received Israel's request to investigate the matter and a prosecutor was appointed and a judge has taken the lead of the investigation. Bruni also wrote that Israeli investigators recently visited Paris and the French authorities conveyed a commitment to coordinate all their activities.

In January 2012, Christophe Bigot stated before a Knesset panel that justice would be served in the case of Lee Zeitouni, but there was little chance that the two would be extradited to Israel from France. Bigot stated, "There is no indifference in France, we are ready to judge them and we want to judge them, we don’t see it any other way." He also emphasized close cooperation between Israeli and French authorities in regards to the case.

=== Campaign to extradite suspects ===
Roy Peled, Zeitouni's fiancé, created the organization 'Justice for Lee' to raise awareness about Zeitouni and achieve justice for her. Peled has stated, "I am not a lawyer and I do not care if there is a legal agreement or not, all I know is that justice must be found and we need to stop the next murder... Lee will never come back to me." Peled is also concerned that foreign nationals who commit crimes in Israel manage to leave with few consequences, and stated that this is "very dangerous."

In late November 2011, activists in a group working to extradite Khayat and Robic from France to Israel handed out flyers at Ben-Gurion International Airport to passengers arriving from France. The flyers had the slogan "license to kill" written on them, and the group hoped to appeal to the French passengers, many of whom are Jewish, to assist in extraditing them from France.

=== French investigation and trial ===
In July 2012, Zeitouni's family filed a complaint in France against Robic and Khayat, after the family unsuccessfully tried to extradite the two to Israel. The French newspaper Le Figaro dedicated its headline to the story, and explained that the two suspects enjoyed a legal loophole that allowed them to remain free. The French authorities couldn't act without a complaint, while the Israeli authorities couldn't act without an extradition. According to the newspaper, "The move seals the deal" and Robic and Khayat would be tried in France. On July 11, 2012, France launched a criminal investigation into the death of Lee Zeitouni.

On December 3, 2014, the driver of the car that hit Lee Zeitouni, Eric Robic, was found guilty of manslaughter, in coincidence with deliberately failing to provide assistance to a person in danger ("non-assistance à personne en danger") and sentenced to 5 years in prison by the criminal court (tribunal correctionnel) in Paris.

Passenger Claude Khayat was found guilty of deliberately failing to provide assistance to a person in danger and was sentenced to 15 months in prison.
