= YuMe =

Data analysis platform

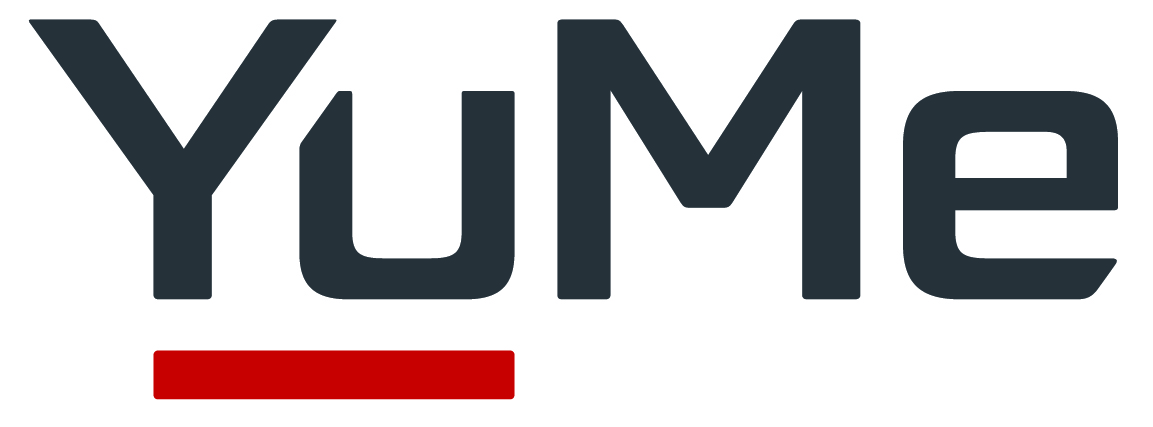
- Website type: Public
- Traded as: LSE: RTHM
- No. of locations: Redwood City, New York City, Chicago, Los Angeles, Atlanta, Boston, Detroit, London, Paris, Madrid, Chennai, Pune
- Creators: Jayant Kadambi, Ayyappan Sankaran
- Industry: Video advertising
- Employees: 500-1000
- Website: yume.com
- Launched: 2004

YuMe is a data analysis platform for television advertising, founded in 2004 by Jayant Kadambi and Ayyappan Sankaran. The company was acquired by RhythmOne plc (LSE AIM: RTHM, “Company” or “RhythmOne”), an advertising technology company, in February 2018.

== History ==
Jayan Ramankutty had just came off of acquisition of Lara tech by Cypress Semi. And Empower tell by IP UNITY. Empower tell was voice over IP. He is now thinking of delivering video over the same. Jayan registered YuMe as LLC. He knew Ayyappan who was from his home town back in India. Eventually Ayyappan joined him. Ayyappan knew Jayant Kadambi from his previous job and he brought him in the equation. Jayan made them equal partner thinking they will bring good energy and they became co- founders. YuMe LLC got converted into YUME Inc. In 2006 investors came in and Jayant and Ayyappan took over the company. 2011, YuMe acquired Appealing Media, a mobile video advertising company. In early 2013, YuMe acquired Crowd Science, an audience targeting technology company, and on August 7, 2013, the company held its initial public offering. In September 2017, YuMe Inc was acquired by San Francisco ad tech company RhythmOne LLC for $185 million. In November 2017, YuMe launched people-based marketing suite. After acquisition of RhythmOne, there has been massive layoffs across all of YuMe's branches. YuMe is also shutting down its office at Chennai by June 30, 2019. Employees have been advised to seek other jobs with a severance package.

== Products ==
YuMe has products for both the supply side and the demand side of the digital video ecosystem. For the demand side, the Connected Audience Network offers brands a way to reach receptive audiences across video inventory running on any of the four connected screens (personal computers, smartphones, tablets, and connected TVs). On the supply side, the YuMe for Publishers suite of products offers digital media owners (publishers, app developers, and CE OEMs) an ad management platform that allows them to maximize their inventory monetization efforts across direct-sold, mediated, and YuMe-fulfilled ads.
