= Shoshana Arbeli-Almozlino =

Israeli politician (1926–2015)

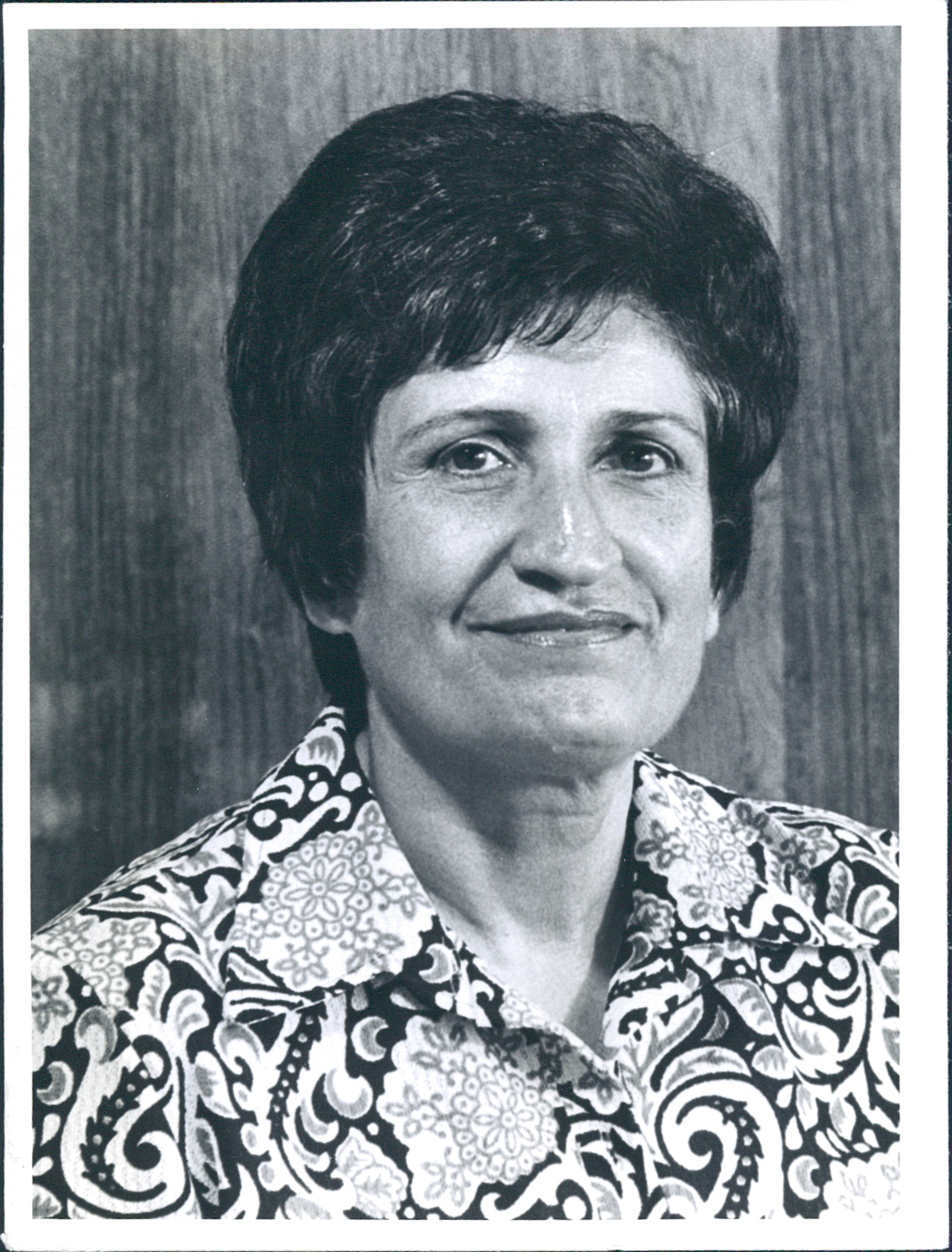
- Arbeli-Almozlino during her time in the Knesset

Ministerial roles
- 1986–1988: Minister of Health

Faction represented in the Knesset
- 1965–1968: Alignment
- 1968–1969: Labor Party
- 1969–1991: Alignment
- 1991–1992: Labor Party

Personal details
- Born: 26 January 1926 Mosul, Iraq
- Died: 12 June 2015 (aged 89) Tel Aviv, Israel

Shoshana Arbeli-Almozlino (Hebrew: שושנה ארבלי-אלמוזלינו; 26 January 1926 – 12 June 2015) was an Israeli politician who served as a member of the Knesset for the Labor Party and the Alignment alliance from 1965 until 1992. She was also Minister of Health between 1986 and 1988.

== Biography ==
Born Shoshana Arbeli in Mosul, Iraq, she was one of six children of the merchant Shmuel Binyamin Arbili (or Arbeli) and his wife Safra. She was an activist with the underground HeHalutz movement, for which she was jailed.

Having originally studied to be a teacher, she emigrated to Mandatory Palestine in 1947. The rest of her family immigrated to Israel in Operation Ezra and Nehemiah in 1951. She joined Ahdut HaAvoda in 1948, becoming a member of the secretariat of the party's Ramat Gan/Givatayim branch. The following year she was amongst the founders of kibbutz Neve Ur. Between 1952 and 1957 she worked as co-ordinator of the women's department of the Ramat Gan Labour Bureau, before serving as co-ordinator of the youth section from 1957 until 1959.

Between 1959 and 1966 she was a member of the secretariat of workers councils, and chaired its department of training and employment. She was also later a member of the Histadrut council and the council of the Na'amat women's organisation. She missed out on election to the Knesset on the Alignment's list in 1965 (the Alignment being an alliance of Ahdut HaAvoda and Mapai), but entered the parliament in January 1966 after two Alignment MKs, Moshe Carmel and Haim Gvati, resigned their seats. She was re-elected in 1969, 1973, 1977, 1981 and 1984.

In September 1984 she was appointed Deputy Minister of Health. In the government formed in October 1986 she became Minister of Health, serving until the 1988 elections, in which she retained her seat, but lost her place in the cabinet. She retired in 1992 after 26 years in the Knesset, and was placed 112th on the Labor Party list for the 1992 elections.

Arbeli-Almozlino died at Tel Aviv Sourasky Medical Center on 12 June 2015 at the age of 89 of Alzheimer's disease.

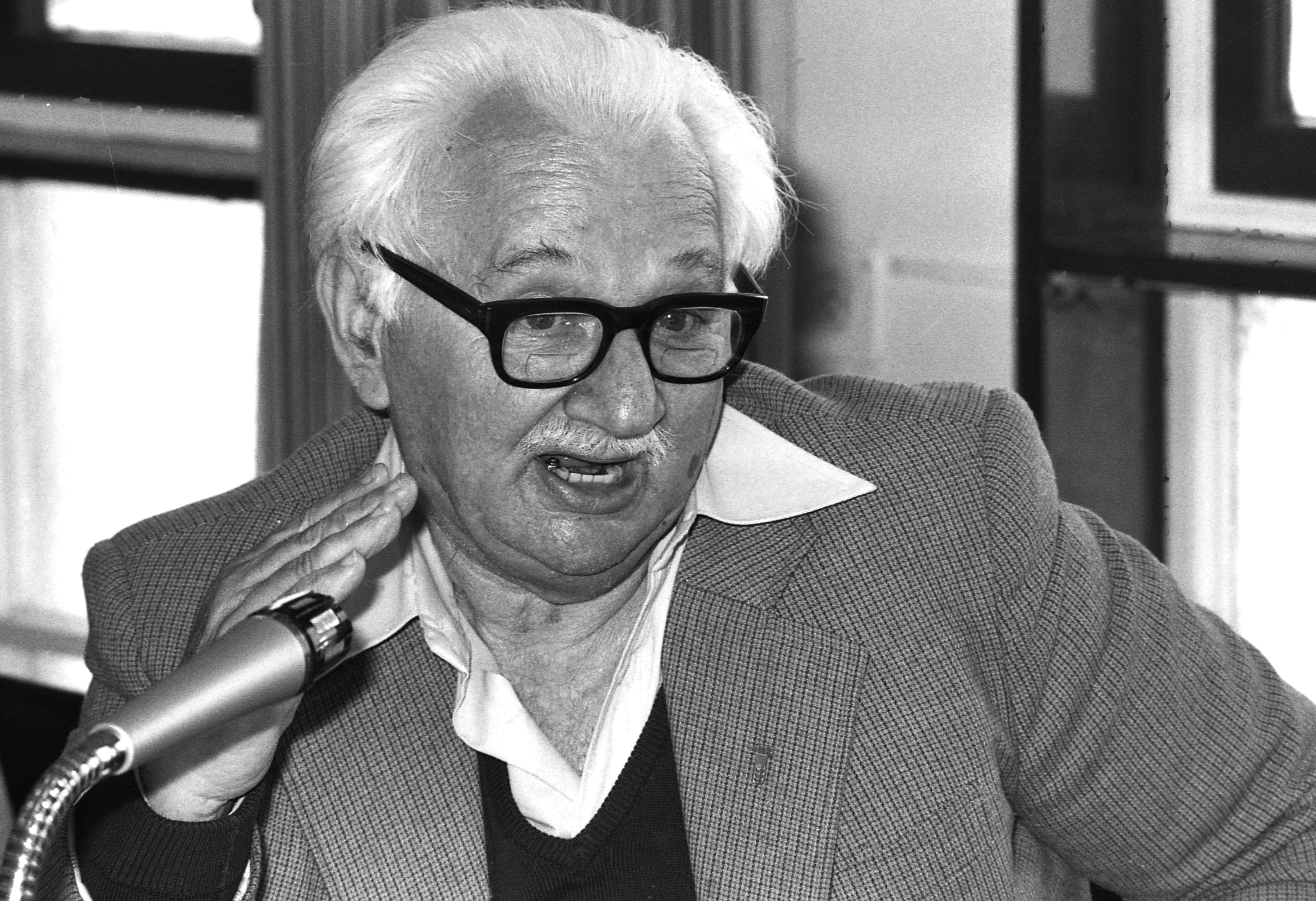
Natan Almozlino

== Marriage ==
In 1965, aged 39, Arbeli married Natan Almozlino, a widower who was active in Ahdut Ha-Avodah and served as the treasurer of the Histadrut. Natan Almozlino and his first wife, Bellina, had two children, Uzi and Yishai. He and Arbeli-Almozlino lived in Givatayim and had no children.
