= People Matters =

Media Platform founded in 2009

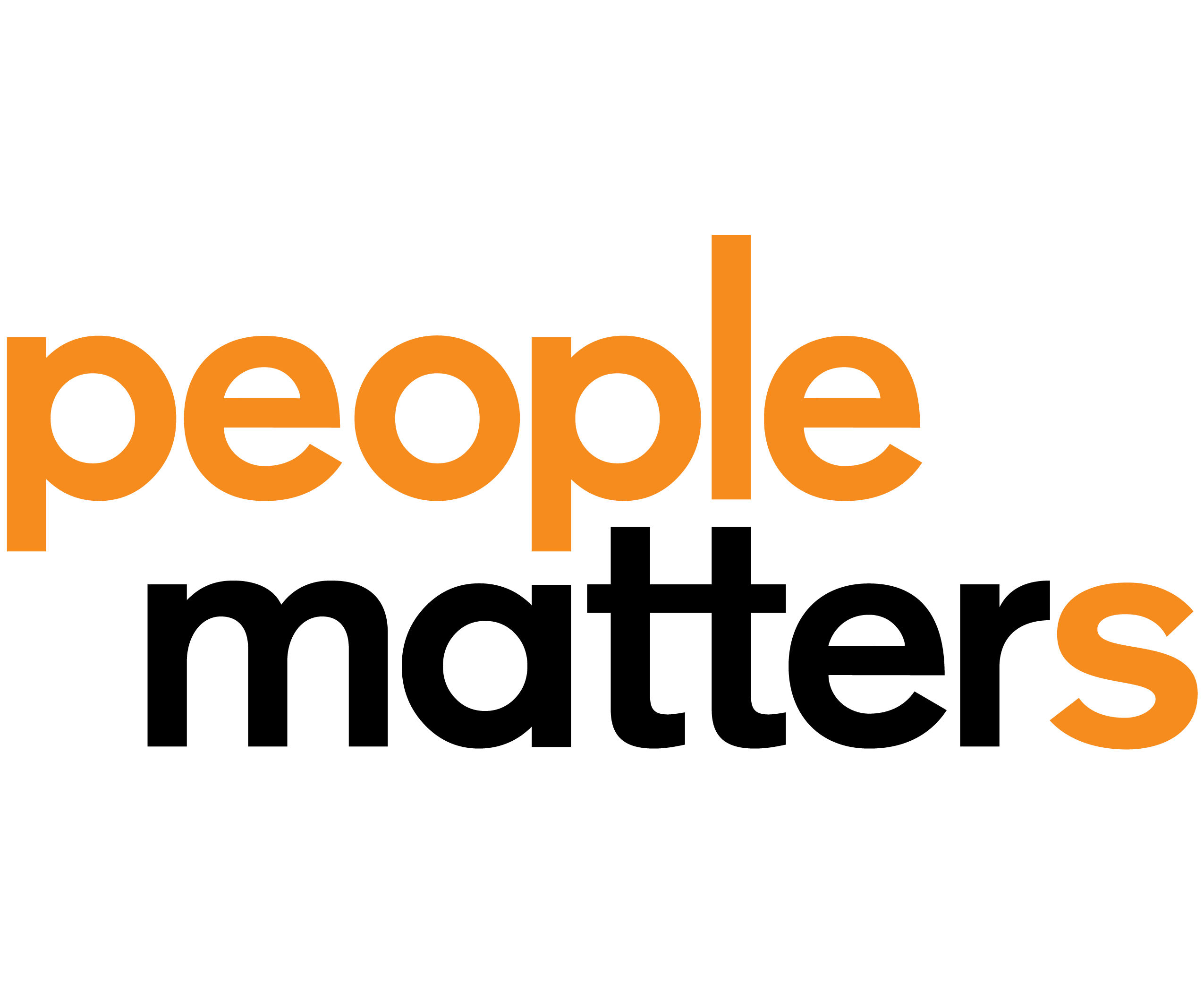
- Founded: 2009
- Founder: Ester Martinez
- Headquarters: Gurugram, Haryana, India
- Area served: India; Singapore; Malaysia; Philippines; Indonesia; Thailand
- Key people: Ester Martinez, Editor In-chief
- Website: peoplematters.in

People Matters is an HR media platform founded in 2009. People Matters aims to foster ideas between HR-related professionals. People Matters prints a homonym magazine, online publishing, conducts research and creates events focused on human resources. Abhijit Bhaduri, Anil Khandelwal and Aatish Jaisinghani among others have collaborated and written popular opinion editorials for People Matters.

In 2012 the HR Fund backed People Matters with ₹4 crore in the first round, with the aim to help build a digital platform. The magazine started in 2010 and can be found in news stands in Delhi, Kolkata, Mumbai, Hyderabad, Chennai and Bengaluru. It has been named the best HR Magazine in Asia in 2012. Besides this monthly printed magazine People Matters has participated in numerous publications globally.

== Awards ==
- Best HR Magazine 2011 at the Asia – Pacific HRM Congress.
