= Ada Geller =

Israeli women's rights activist (1888-1949)

- עדה גלר
- Born: 4 May 1888; Tlumach
- Died: 30 March 1949 (aged 60); Jerusalem
- Known for: Women's rights activist, first woman accountant in mandatory Palestine

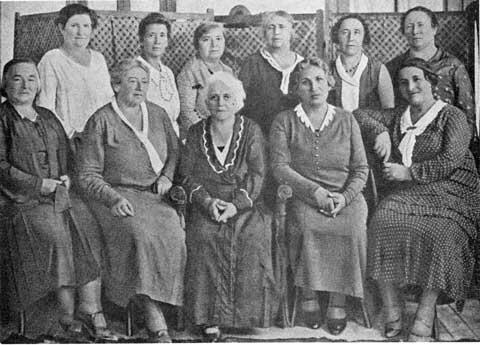
Ada Geller (standing on the far left)

Ada Geller (Hebrew: עדה גלר; 4 May 1888 – 30 March 1949) was a Zionist and women's rights activist, a teacher and headmaster, and the first woman accountant in Mandatory Palestine.

== Biography ==
Geller was born on 4 May 1888 in the town Tlumach (currently in Ukraine). Despite attending a Polish school, she learned Hebrew and later also taught Hebrew to girls and young women.

In 1911, Geller immigrated to Ottoman Palestine, and served as teacher and headmaster at the "Shoshana" handicrafts school in Jerusalem. After the school was closed in 1922, Geller left for the USA, where she studied accounting and trading. She returned to mandatory Palestine in 1927, and after a relentless negotiation with the British Mandate, succeeded in obtaining an accountant work permit. Thus, she became the first woman, and for many years also the sole woman, in this profession. As an accountant, Geller became an executive of the Jerusalem-based King Solomon Bank.

== Women's rights activism ==
In addition to her work as teacher, executive and accountant, Geller was active as an advocate for women's rights. The handicrafts school she headed was intended to provide educational and occupational opportunities to young women from low socioeconomic background, supported by the "Women's Association for Cultural Work", led by Sarah Thon. After obtaining her accounting permit, she joined an organization of academic women, and was active in the "Organization of Hebrew Women for Equal Rights in Palestine".

== Commemoration ==
Geller streets exist in Jerusalem and Beersheba.
