= Papaya Global =

Fintech SaaS company

- Industry: Fintech
- Founded: 2016; 10 years ago
- Founder: Eynat Guez, Ruben Drong, Ofer Herman
- Headquarters: New York, USA
- Key people: Eynat Guez (CEO)
- Services: Global payroll, Workforce management, Cross-border payments, Employer of Record (EOR), Contractor management, Global benefits and immigration services, Equity management
- Number of employees: 700+ (2023)
- Website: www.papayaglobal.com

Papaya Global is a fintech SaaS company that specializes in global workforce payroll and payments. Eynat Guez is the CEO and co-founder of the company. The company gained unicorn status (more than $1 billion in valuation) in 2021. In March 2022, Papaya Global acquired Azimo. The company provides a unified platform that enables businesses to pay and manage employees and contractors worldwide, ensuring compliance with local regulations. Initially, Papaya has expanded into a payments-first workforce management platform, supporting organizations in over 160 countries.

== History ==
=== 2016–2021: Startup in workforce management ===
PAPAYA Global was founded in 2016, by Eynat Guez, Ruben Drong, and Ofer Herman. The company raised $1.5 million in June 2016. In November 2019, the company raised $45 million in a Series A funding round led by Insight Partners and Bessemer Venture Partners.

In September 2020, Papaya Global secured an additional $40 million in Series B funding, led by Scale Venture Partners and Workday Ventures. This investment aimed at further developing the company's technology and expanding its market reach. The following year, in March 2021, Papaya Global raised $100 million in a Series C funding round led by GreenOaks Capital Partners, with participation from IVP and Alkeon. This round valued the company at over $1 billion. In September 2021, Papaya Global raised $250 million in Series D funding, bringing the company's valuation to $3.7 billion led by Insight Partners and Tiger Global Management.

=== 2022–: Global payroll and payments company ===
In March 2022, Papaya Global acquired Azimo, a cross-border payments platform, for an estimated $150–200 million, securing payment licenses in the UK, Netherlands, Canada, Australia, and Hong Kong. In January 2023 Papaya announced that it will move all its money from Israel following the 2023 Israeli judicial reform. Dovi Frances invested in PAPAYA Global, which he later sold at an estimated valuation of approximately $400 million.

In March 2023, the company underwent a rebranding as a payments company, and launched ad campaigns including a Super Bowl LVIII advertisement under the tagline "Small Balls. Big Game." In 2025, Papaya launched a follow-up campaign during the Super Bowl LIX.

== Products and services ==
Papaya Global provides a cloud-based platform for managing global workforce payments and payroll. Its services include payroll processing in over 160 countries, contractor management, Employer of Record (EOR) solutions, and equity administration tools. The platform is designed to support compliance with local labor laws and tax regulations across jurisdictions.

== Operations ==
Papaya Global is headquartered in New York City, with additional offices in Hong Kong, Herzliya (Israel), London, Austin (Texas), Krakow, Melbourne, India, Singapore, and Barcelona. As of 2024, the company employed approximately 832 people.

== See also ==
- Global labor arbitrage
- Global workforce
- Deel, Inc.
