= Emil Grunzweig Human Rights Award =

Israeli award

- Awarded for: a unique contribution to the advancement of human rights in Israel
- Country: Israel
- Presented by: Association for Civil Rights in Israel
- First award: 1981; 45 years ago

The Emil Grunzweig Human Rights Award is an award made annually by the Association for Civil Rights in Israel to "an individual or NGO that has made a unique contribution to the advancement of human rights in Israel". The award was established in 1981 but was renamed in 1983 after the murder of activist Emil Grunzweig by a grenade thrown by a right-wing activist during a Peace Now demonstration against the war in Lebanon.

== Winners of the award ==
Winners of the award have included:

- 1981 – Gabriel Stern, journalist for Al Hamishmar
- 1982 – Yehuda Litani, Haaretz reporter in the occupied territories; special posthumous recognition to Robert Weltsch, a Jewish journalist in Germany
- 1983 – Lieutenant Colonel Dov Yermiya, for his activities promoting the welfare of civilians in Lebanon; this was the first year the award was named after Emil Grunzweig
- 1984 – Moshe Negbi, editor of the radio program "Din Udvarim"
- 1985 – Baruch Meiri, journalist for Maariv
- 1986 – Prof. Yitzhak Zamir, former legal advisor to the government
- 1987 – High court justice Zvi Berenson
- 1988 – Reporters in the occupied territories
- 1989 – Alice Shalvi, the founder of the Israel Women's Network
- 1990 – Yitzhak Kadman, head of the Israel National Council for the Child
- 1991 – Dr. Lotte Salzberger, a founder of the HaMoked: Center for the Defence of the Individual
- 1992 – Bassem Eid, the founder of the Palestinian Human Rights Monitoring Group; special award to Mr. James Ya'acov Rosenthal, journalist, for his lifelong devotion to human rights
- 1993 – Eyal Simchoni, attorney
- 1994 – Yitzhak Clinton Bailey, campaigner for Bedouin rights
- 1995 – "Women against Violence", a foundation for aid to women and girls who have been victims of violence in the Arab sector
- 1996 – Gideon Levy, Haaretz journalist
- 1997 – "Community Advocacy", a legal organisation that assists residents of impoverished neighborhoods in obtaining their rights; the Juarish family, for agreeing to donate the organs of their son, killed by Israeli Defence Forces fire, to recipients both Jewish and Arab
- 1998 – Kav LaOved (Workers' Hotline), for their activities promoting the rights of foreign workers; Aluf Hareven former intelligence officer, Foreign Ministry official and scholar, for his strengthening the relations between Jews and Arabs; special lifetime award to Shulamit Aloni
- 1999 – Physicians for Human Rights and its founder Ruchama Marton
- 2000 – Haaretz journalist Dr. Yossi Algazi
- 2002 – The Hotline for migrant workers
- 2003 – the women of Machsom Watch, organization of Israeli women who monitor checkpoints
- 2004 – Hanna Safran, feminist
- 2006 – Adva Center for analysis of Israeli policy
- 2007 – Kolech ("Your Voice", fem.), the religious Zionist feminist movement
- 2008 – "Breaking the Silence"; The Refugee Rights Clinic at Tel Aviv University
- 2009 – Nir Katz of blessed memory; Ruth and Paul Kedar of the Yesh Din organization for human rights
- 2010 - Former Judge Yehudit Tsur; Negev Coexistence Forum for Civil Equality and Oren Yiftachel
- 2011 – Keren Neubach, journalist; Tamar Pelleg-Sryck, attorney and human rights activist; Koah LaOvdim – Democratic Workers’ Organization
- 2012 – Attorney Gaby Lasky; Attorney Michael Sfard; Coalition Tag Meir
- 2013 – Sari Bashi and Gisha – The Legal Center for Freedom of Movement
- 2014-2015 – The Association of Rape Crisis Centers (ARCCI); Prof. Kenneth Mann and The Public Defender’s Office
- 2017 – The Task Force on Human Trafficking and Prostitution; Vered Lee, journalist; Salah Haj Yahya, mobile clinic director, Physicians for Human Rights - Israel
- 2018 – Shula Keshet, artist, social and political activist and Mizrahi feminist; Odeh Bisharat, author; Itach Ma’aki – Women Lawyers for Social Justice
- 2019 – Salametcom Association; Attorney Eitay Mack
- 2022 – Jessica Nevo, sociologist, co-founder of Justice in Case - The Center for Alternative Justice; Gadi Algazi, professor of history and social activist; Kholod Massalha, general manager, I’lam - Arab Center for Media Freedom, Development and Research
- 2024 – Dr. Sharaf Hassan - Sociologist, educator, activist, serves as the Chair of the Committee Tracking Arab Education; Local Call (Sikha Mikomit) - Independent journalism website committed to democracy, opposition to the occupation and the pursuit of peace, equality, and social justice; Yuval Avraham - Writer for Local Conversation; Oren Ziv - Photographer, journalist, a founder of the photography collective "Activistills"; Amalia Wiesel - Advocate for the right to health, life, freedom of movement for sick children from Gaza
- 2025 – Jack Khoury - Haaretz journalist, news director of Radio A-Shams; Dr. Assaf David - Head of Israel in the Middle East program at the Van Leer Institute; co-founder and academic director of the Forum for Regional Thinking; Michal Deutsh, Matanel Ciechanowski - Founders of Changing Direction (Meshanim Kivun), nonviolent activists
