= Basel Adra =

Palestinian journalist and activist (born 1996)

- باسل عدرا
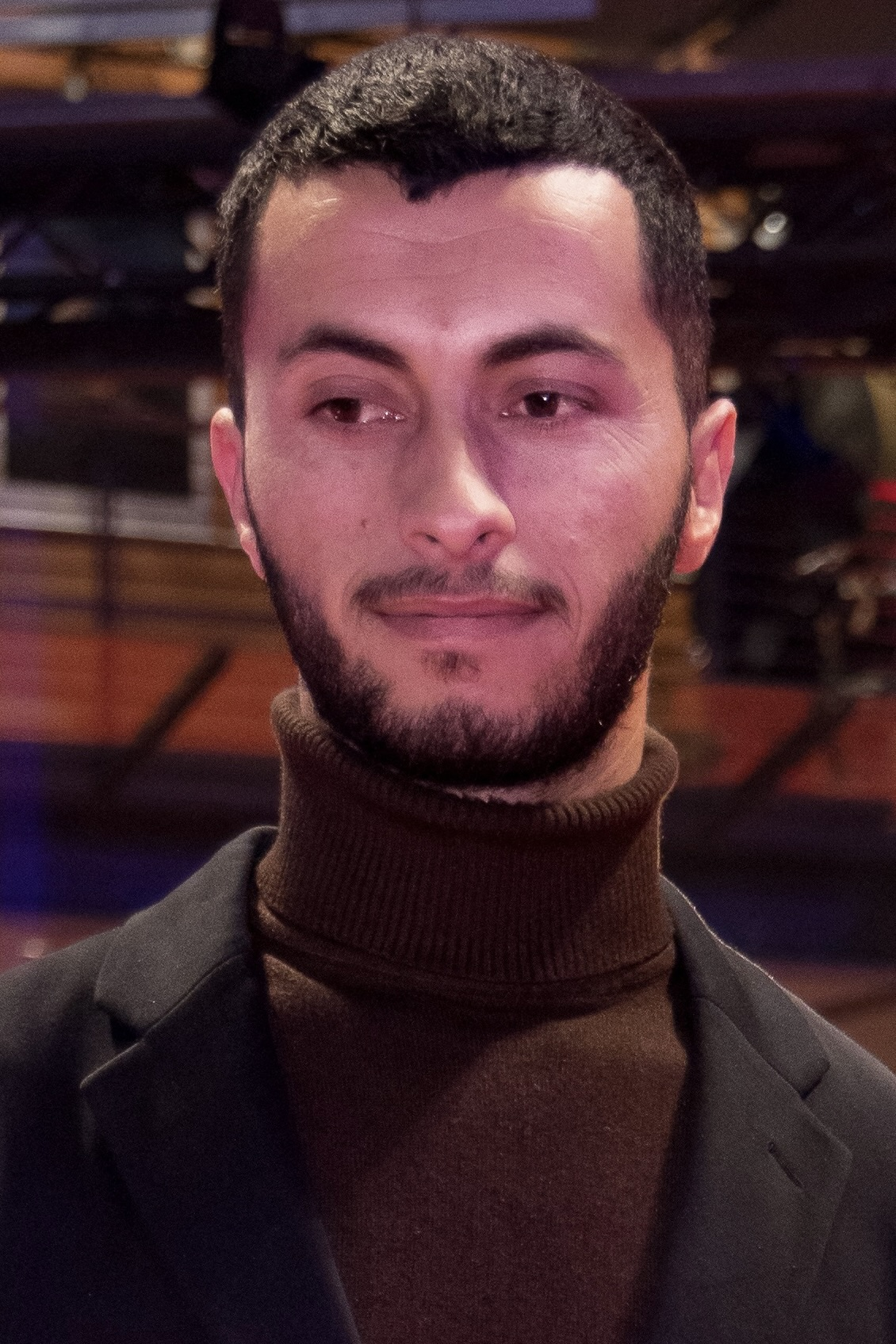
- Adra at the 2024 Berlinale
- Born: June 13, 1996 (age 30); At-Tuwani, Hebron, Palestine
- Occupations: Journalist; filmmaker
- Employers: +972 Magazine; Local Call
- Organization: B'Tselem

Basel Adra (Note: Given name also romanized as Basil, last name also romanized as Adraa.) (or Al-Adra; (Note: Also romanized as Al-Adraa.) Arabic: باسل عدرا or باسل العدرا; born June 13, 1996) is a Palestinian film director, lawyer and journalist. He has documented attempts by the Israel Defense Forces (IDF) to expel Palestinian villagers from the occupied West Bank and the violence committed by Israeli settlers.

Adra co-wrote and co-directed the 2024 documentary film No Other Land with Israeli journalist Yuval Abraham and activists Hamdan Ballal and Rachel Szor. The film captures the plight of the besieged community of Masafer Yatta, where Adra was raised, showing Israeli forces demolishing homes and forcibly removing families who have lived there for generations, claiming the land for military training purposes. It premiered at the 74th Berlin International Film Festival and won the Panorama Audience Award for Best Documentary Film and the Berlinale Documentary Film Award. In 2025, the film won the Academy Award for Best Documentary Feature Film, making Adra the first Palestinian filmmaker to win an Oscar.

== Career and activism ==
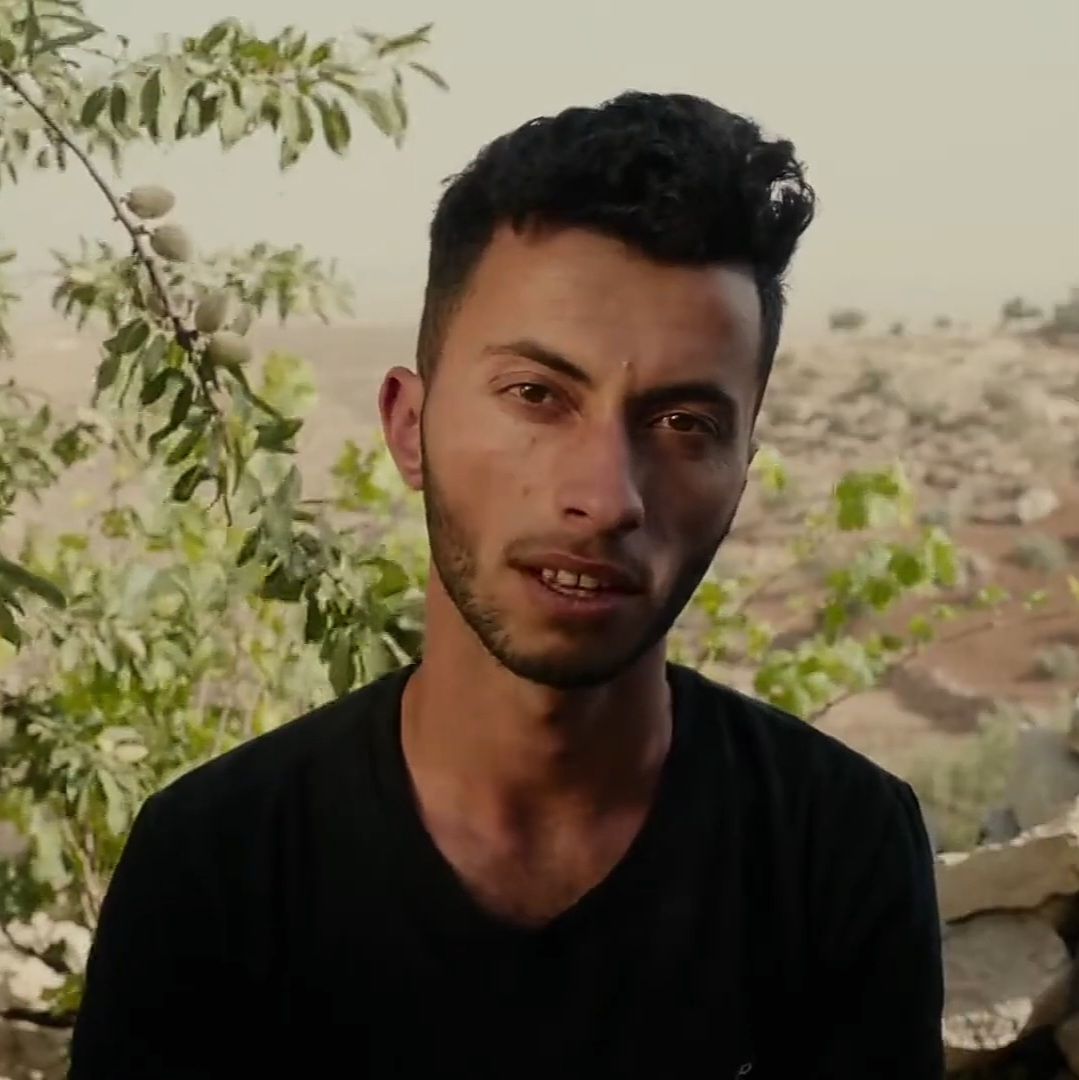
Adra in Masafer Yatta, June 2022

Adra is an activist and a volunteer photographer for B'Tselem. He works as journalist for online publications +972 Magazine and Local Call along with photojournalist Oren Ziv, who wrote the +972 Magazine article following the Channel 12 allegations made against al-Adra.

In 2021, the HaKol HaYehudi and Channel 12 news outlets accused al-Adra of setting fire to a building in the Hebron Hills (the West Bank) claiming that he tried to frame Jewish settlers and Israeli Defence Forces (IDF) soldiers for the incident. The body camera footage used by Channel 12 instead shows that the fire was caused by a tear gas canister fired by the Israeli army, and al-Adra can be seen trying to put it out. Since then, Channel 12 News and the right-wing media in Israel have failed to provide any evidence to support their claims against al-Adra, and the news channel has said it does not intend to investigate the incident further.

In 2022, he was beaten while he was recording the IDF demolishing a structure that he had built, and detained in harsh conditions after filming an attack by an Israeli army security coordinator in 2023.

== No Other Land ==
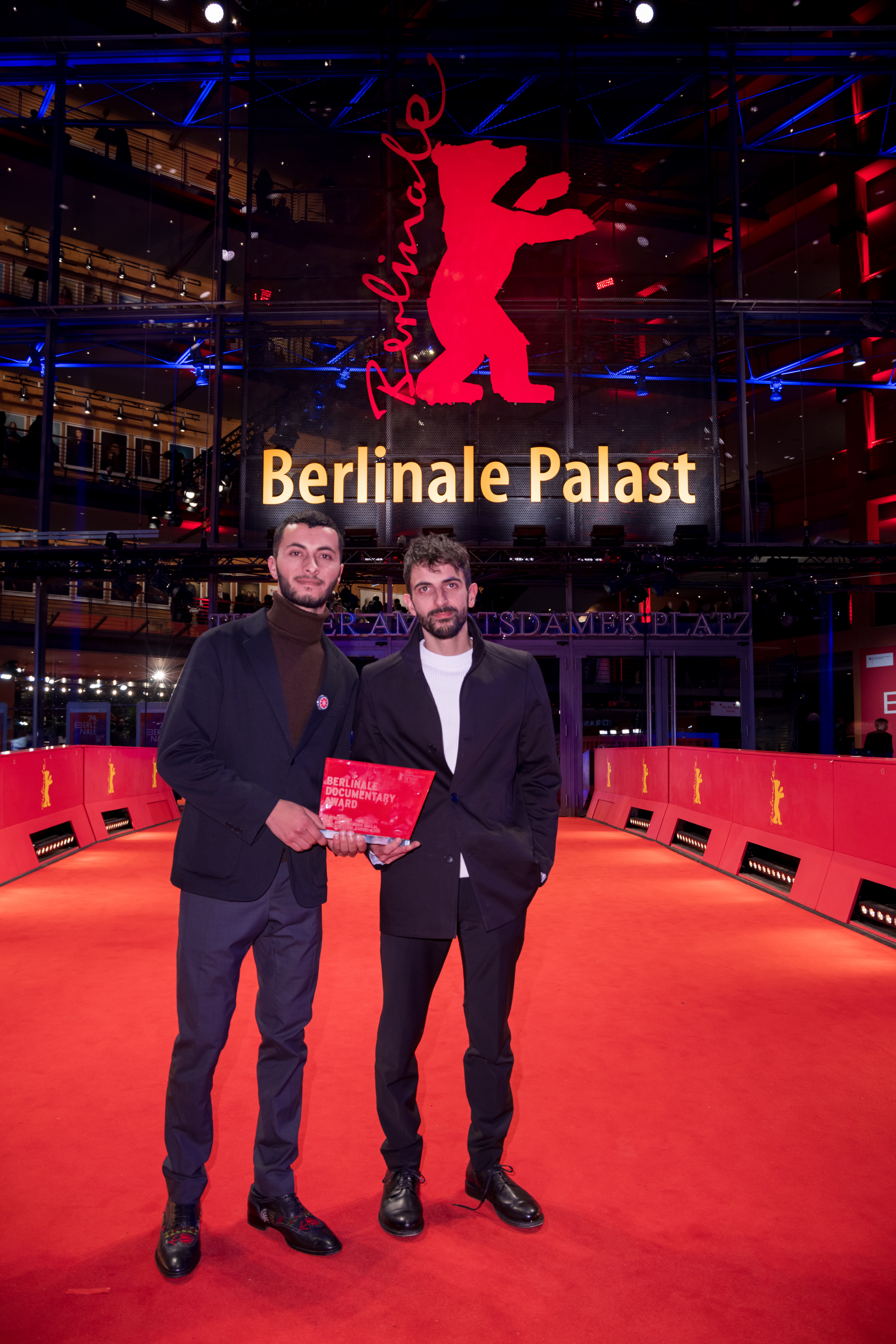
Basel Adra and Yuval Abraham with their Berlinale award

In February 2024, the film No Other Land about the situation of Masafer Yatta that he co-wrote and co-directed with Israelis Yuval Abraham and Rachel Szor and Palestinian Hamdan Ballal, premiered at the 74th Berlin International Film Festival and won the Berlinale Best Documentary film award and Panorama Audience Award for Best Documentary Film. The film won the Best Documentary Feature Film category at the 97th Academy Awards.

== Personal life ==
Adra was born to father Nasser in At-Tuwani, Hebron Municipality, in the West Bank of Palestine. He lives in Masafer Yatta, Hebron. Adra married in 2024 and has a daughter.

On 3 February 2025, Adra was attacked by masked Israeli settler extremists in Masafer Yatta. On March 24, 2025, after No Other Land co-director Hamdan Ballal was also attacked by Israeli settlers, Adra said: "We came back from the Oscars and every day since there is an attack on us. This might be their revenge on us for making the movie. It feels like a punishment."

On 13 September 2025, a group of Israeli settlers, from the illegal Havat Ma'on outpost, attacked Adra's village, injuring three family members and a foreign activist. Israeli soldiers at the scene did not intervene during the attack, and while Adra accompanied the injured to the hospital, nine Israeli soldiers raided his home. The soldiers searched through his wife's phone, detained one of his uncles, and blocked At-Tuwani's entrance, preventing Adra from returning home.

== See also ==
- Human rights violations against Palestinians by Israel
- Israeli apartheid
- Gaza genocide
