= Bassem Eid =

Palestinian human rights activist and political analyst (born 1958)

- باسم عيد
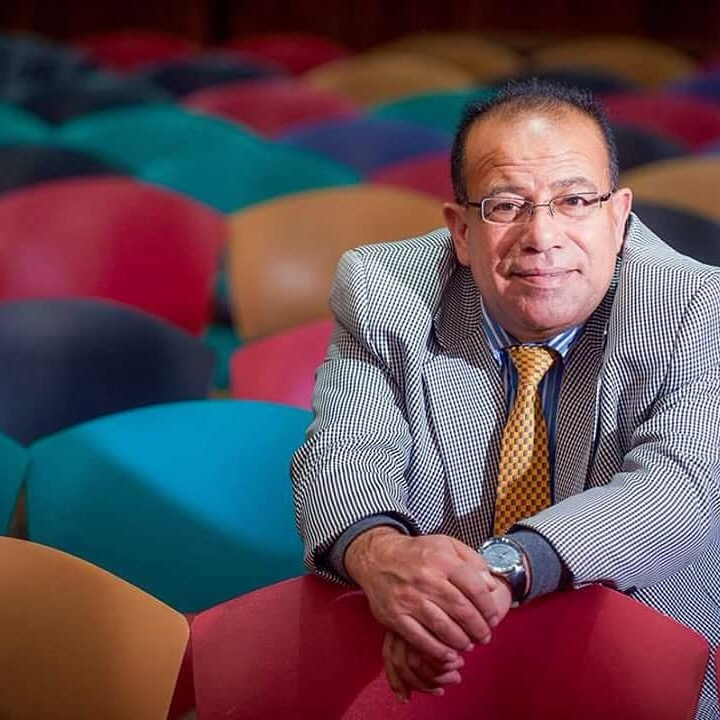
- Born: 5 February 1958 (age 68); East Jerusalem, Jordanian West Bank (now West Bank)
- Occupation: Political analyst
- Known for: Founder, Palestinian Human Rights Monitoring Group

Bassem Eid (Arabic: باسم عيد; born 5 February 1958) is a Palestinian living in East Jerusalem who comments on the Israeli–Palestinian conflict for Israeli TV and radio. He has been invited to speak by many pro-Israeli organizations in North America, including on university campuses.

Eid initially worked for B'Tselem, documenting Israeli human rights violations against Palestinians, but changed his views after the Oslo Accords. His research currently focuses on human rights violations committed by the Palestinian Authority (PA) and the Palestinian armed forces.

Bassem Eid opposes the Palestinian right of return. Eid opposes the one-state solution. In 2023, Bassem also opposed the creation of a Palestinian state and predicted Israel will annex the West Bank without giving Palestinian residents full citizenship.

== Biography ==
Eid was born in the Jewish Quarter of the Jordanian-ruled Old City of Jerusalem. In 1966, the Jordanian government evacuated over 500 Palestinian families, including Eid's family, and relocated them to Shuafat Refugee Camp, with no clear reason given. He spent the first 33 years of his life in the United Nations Refugee Works Agency (UNRWA) refugee camp of Shuafat. He rose to prominence during the First Intifada and was a senior field researcher for B’Tselem, a non-governmental organization reporting on human rights abuses in Israeli administered areas of the West Bank.

Eid reports that his views began to change as PLO leader Yasser Arafat came to power during the Oslo Accords. He believes that the violence and corruption committed by Arafat stalled the Israeli-Palestinian peace process and that it has "been stuck for many years".

Eid says the reason the European Union and other Europeans donate to B'Tselem is because Europeans are "out for revenge on the State of Israel".

In response, Eid set up his own organization to monitor violations of human rights being committed by the Palestinian Authority against Palestinians. In 1996, he founded the Jerusalem-based Palestinian Human Rights Monitoring Group, and was arrested shortly thereafter. He formally ended his work at the group in October 2010.

Since 2003, Eid has worked as a paid political commentator for Israeli TV, and since 2009, he has worked as a commentator on Palestinian politics for Israeli Radio (Reshet Bet). In 2016, he assumed the role of chairman of the Center for Near East Policy Research.

== Human rights and advocacy work ==
In 1997, The Washington Post called Eid "an internationally recognized rights campaigner."

He has spent 26 years researching UNRWA policies and has written extensively on the subject of UNRWA reform. He advocates against the right of return of Palestinian refugees.

Eid is a critic of the Boycott, Divestment and Sanctions (BDS) movement. In 2021, he sued Ben & Jerry's for ending sales in the West Bank, Jerusalem and Gush Etzion.

Per his website, he has traveled widely to lecture on the Palestinian-Israeli conflict. In the United Kingdom, he presented his research on UNRWA to the British think tank The Henry Jackson Society in December, 2015. He has also appeared as a speaker for a workshop at the International Institute for Counter-Terrorism in Herzliya, Israel.

== Views ==
=== Two-state solution ===
Eid has blamed the Palestinian people for the Israeli government shift to the right. During the Gaza war, Eid commented to the National Post that he no longer sees a two-state solution as a possibility given Hamas's control over Gaza and Abbas's control over the West Bank. He further stated that he believes Israel will annex the West Bank over the next 20–30 years. He has condemned Hamas for the October 7 attack against Israel and has criticized Turkey and Jordan for supporting them. In January 2024, Eid criticised Palestinian leaders since the beginning of the 20th century for having rejected all offers of a state and consistently opposing peace.

Eid is against dividing Jerusalem and favors it remaining open to all communities and religions. On security, he blames Palestinian leadership for failures in Gaza post-Israel's withdrawal and has condemned Hamas on several occasions. Eid believes that the majority of West Bank Palestinians prioritize economic issues over land and further believes that the majority of East Jerusalem Palestinians are leaning towards Israeli citizenship for more rights.

=== Palestinian right of return ===
On refugees, Eid sees the right of return as unworkable and thinks other countries should resettle refugees or grant them citizenship, particularly Jordan and Syria. Eid blames Arab countries rather than Israel for the status of Palestinian refugees. He believes the Palestinian leadership uses refugees as a political tool against Israel. Furthermore, he believes Zionism is not discriminatory towards Arabs. He stresses that peace requires confidence-building, not just agreements. In 2022, Eid stated to the Jewish News Syndicate that Palestinian culture is taught to celebrate grievance rather than peace with Israel. He further stated that the Nakba Day perpetuates this cycle of grievance and hatred as it distorts history and Israel's existence.

=== BDS movement ===
Eid is highly critical of the Boycott, Divestment and Sanctions movement, accusing it of harming Palestinians economically. He disputes accusations of Israeli apartheid; he acknowledges that discrimination exists within Israel like any other country but does not address the charge of apartheid in the West Bank. He believes Palestinians would face harsher crackdowns of violence if living in other Middle Eastern countries.

Eid was critical of a May 2026 effort by the Park Slope Food Coop to remove Israeli-produced products such as Bamba snacks from its shelves, noting that "Not a single Palestinian life will change for the better because of this vote" in which voting procedures were changed to restrict voting to online and eliminate the standard supermajority requirement. Rather than a boycott that he felt accomplished little for Palestinians, Eid advocated for changes in Palestinian society to work towards co-existence with Israel based on shared efforts to build prosperity and stability.

== Published works ==
Eid has contributed editorial articles to publications such as The Jerusalem Post and Times of Israel. He participated in the Doha Debates series by the Qatar Foundation in 2007 advocating for the motion "This House believes the Palestinians should give up their full right of return."

=== Publications ===
- Neither Law Nor Justice: Human Rights in the Occupied Territories Since the Oslo Accords (co-written by PHRMG and B’Tselem, 1996)
- The State of Human Rights in Palestine I: The practice of torture by the Palestinian Authority (1997)
- violations of freedom of the press and freedom of expression (1997)
- deaths in custody (1997)
- police brutality (PHRMG)
- The State of Human Rights in Palestine II. In-depth report on the judicial system (1997)
- illegal arrests, and long term illegal detention (PHRMG)
- Eid, Bassem (2011). "10: Fatah and Hamas Human Rights Violations in the Palestinian Occupied Territories from April 2006 to December 2007". In Matthews, Elizabeth (ed.). The Israel-Palestine Conflict: Parallel Discourses. Routledge. ISBN 9781136884320.

== Awards ==
The Association for Civil Rights in Israel awarded him its Emil Gruenzweig Memorial Award in 1992.

== Personal life ==
Eid calls himself "a proud Palestinian who grew up in a refugee camp and raised a large family". As of November 2023, he lives in Jericho, in the West Bank, and identifies as Muslim.
