= Koah LaOvdim =

- Koah LaOvdim – Democratic Workers’ Organization
- כוח לעובדים
- Founded: 2007
- Members: 19,000 (2024)
- Award: Emil Grunzweig Human Rights Award
- Website: workers.org.il

Koah LaOvdim (Hebrew: כוח לעובדים, lit. 'Power to the Workers') is an Israeli labor union organization founded in 2007 (and registered in 2008) as an initiative by a group of social and labor activists to create a new, active and militant general labor union in Israel. The organization was established as a result of several failed labor struggles and unionization attempts in Israel in the preceding years, primarily that of the temporary labourers in the Ben Gurion International Airport in 2006. In the years since its establishment, Koah LaOvdim has increased its numbers substantially and by 2017 it became Israel's third largest labor union with around 35,000 workers represented by the organization. The organization's establishment is often credited with initiating the "unionization boom" of the late 2000s in Israel.

== Goals ==
The union's political position is on the left, with their stated aims being:

- To assist unorganized workers in getting organized in their workplace both in the public and the private sector.
- To promote the existence of organized labor in the Israeli economy.
- To wage an uncompromising struggle in the defense of workers’ rights and the improvement of their pay and working conditions.
- To work for the establishment of social and economic justice, a welfare state and industrial democracy.

Koah LaOvdim is a multi-national, trans-ethnic and cross-sectional organization, unionizing workers from all sectors of Israeli society, with equality and solidarity between Jews and Arabs being one of the organization's core beliefs, it has worked to mitigate racist incidents towards Arab workers in Israel. Koah LaOvdim is also a proponent of feminism and gender equality in the workforce, and it maintains a feminist section called "Koah LaOvdot".

== Awards ==
In 2011 the labor union received the Emil Grunzweig Human Rights Award, which is granted annually since 1981 by the Association for Civil Rights in Israel (ACRI) to individuals and organizations that have made an outstanding contribution to the advancement of human rights in Israel. The nomination stated that the union "has played a leading role in the key battles for workers' rights and trade agreements. The organization combats harmful work conditions in the private and public sectors, and helps promote the values of social and economic equality".

In 2020 on independence day, Reut Peretz, the head of the Jerusalem office of the union, was selected to light a torch in the alternative torch lighting ceremony organized annually by Yesh Gvul.
