= 2017 Humboldt University lecture incident =

BDS controversy

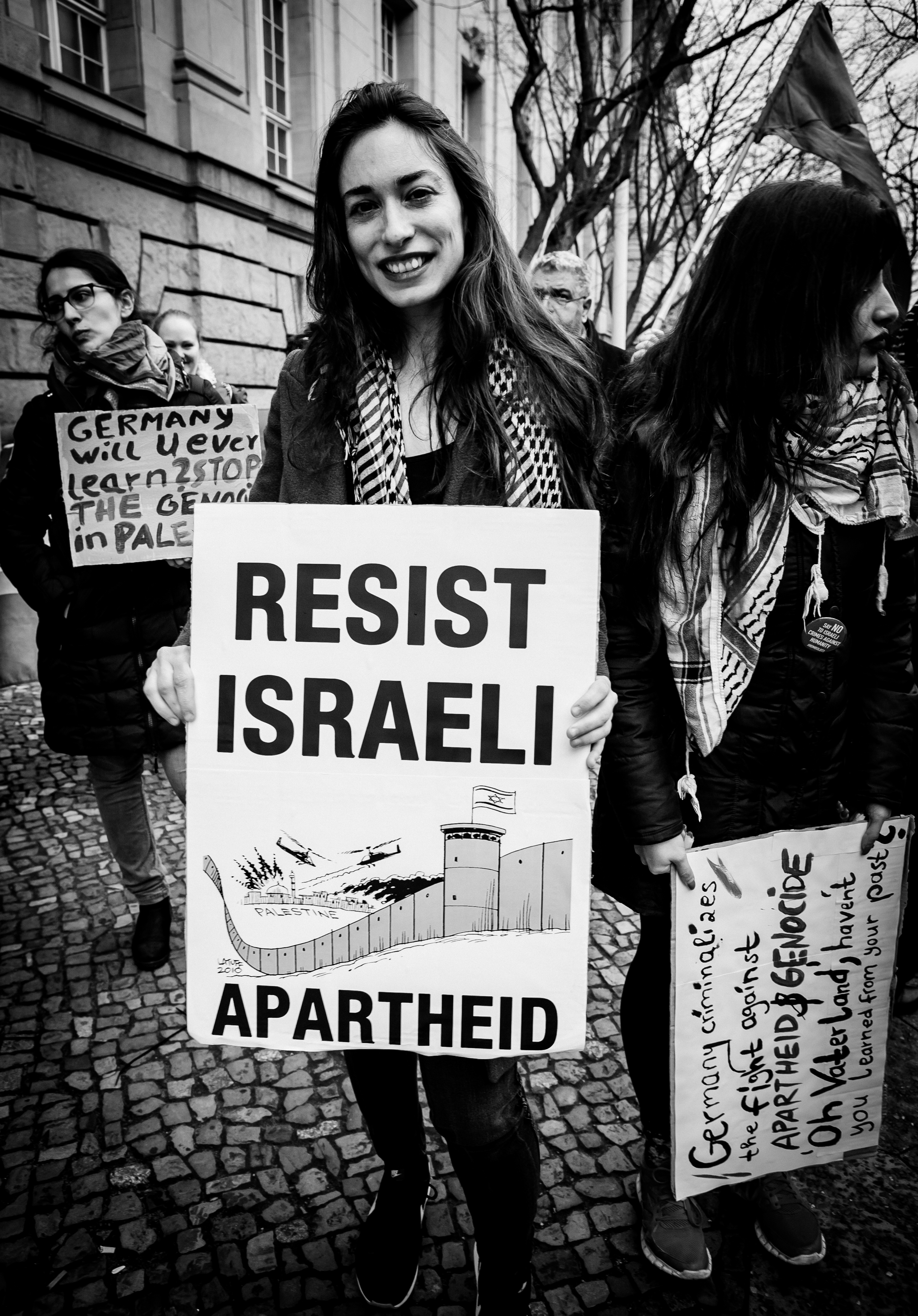
Stavit Sinai during a BDS protest in 2019

On June 20, 2017, BDS activists, including at least two Israeli Jews and at least one Palestinian, disrupted a lecture by Israeli politician Aliza Lavie taking place at Humboldt University of Berlin. Humboldt University was not the organizer of the lecture. The activists expressed accusations against Israel and Lavie, including accusations of war crimes and apartheid. The activists were then removed from the lecture hall.

On August 3, 2020, a Berlin court sentenced Stavit Sinai, one of the BDS activists, to a 450 euro fine for assault, related to the fact that she pounded on the door of the lecture hall, which reportedly caused injuries to two people. Her fellow activists claimed Sinai had been punched in the face while being ejected from the lecture hall, and tried to get back in to find out the identity of the person who had hit her. Two other BDS activists charged in relation to the incident, Ronnie Barkan and Majed Abusalama, were found not guilty.

The conviction of Stavit Sinai for assault was used as an argument for calling BDS a violent movement.

== Incident ==
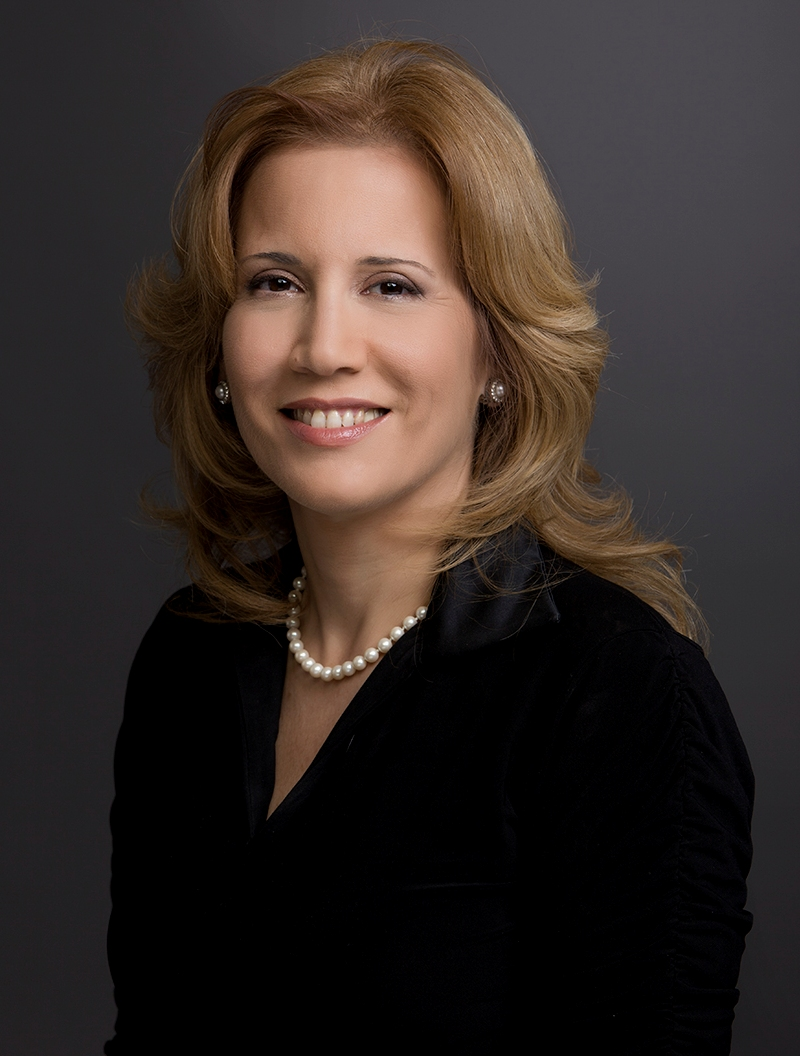
Aliza Lavie, Member of Knesset

On June 20, 2017, an event was taking place in one of the lecture halls at Humboldt University in Berlin. The organizers were DIG (Deutsch-Israelische Gesellschaft) and Mideast Freedom Forum Berlin (the executive director of which is also a DIG member) The event took place in English. The title of the event was Leben in Israel - Terror, Voreingenommenheit und die Chancen für eine Friedenslösung (Life in Israel - Terror, Bias and the Chances for Peace).

The announcement of the event also mentioned BDS and their "questionable" purpose (boycott of Israel).

It was advertised as lecture and discussion with Aliza Lavie, Knesset MP, Yesh Atid, Committee on Foreign Affairs and Defense, and members of the delegation of Yesh Atid and Young Yesh Atid. Aliza Lavie was also the chair of the Knesset Caucus for the Struggle Against the Delegitimization of the State of Israel; one BDS activist characterized her as the "chair of anti-BDS lobby".

Besides members of Yesh Atid and the party's youth organization, an 82-year-old Holocaust survivor, Dvora Weinstein, was also present (she was not speaking, at least at the time of the incident). (Note: Dvora Weinstein, or any participants being Holocaust survivors, were not mentioned in the announcement of the event. The announcement did however mention that Aliza Lavie and members of Young Yesh Atid will talk about how Israel was created after the Holocaust.)

Among the audience were at least three BDS activists: Stavit Sinai (an Israeli Jewish university lecturer), Ronnie Barkan (an Israeli Jewish math teacher) and Majed Abusalama (a Gaza Palestinian born in the Jabalia refugee camp, shot in a leg by an Israeli soldier during a nonviolent protest).

According to Michael Spaney from DIG, "several minutes" or "about 10 minutes" into Aliza Lavie's lecture, one of the activists started shouting at her before being removed from the hall, and then two others started speaking and/or shouting against Lavie and against Israel before being removed too. The activists were accusing Israel of apartheid and accusing Israel, and Aliza Lavie specifically, of war crimes in Gaza.

Lavie said the activists told her "the blood of the Gaza Strip is on your hands" and called the politician a "child murderer" (a reference to the 2014 bombardment and airstrikes in Gaza). Lavie and her group reportedly left the hall through a back exit to avoid a group of about 20 protesters at the main entrance.

Describing the way the activists were removed from the hall by DIG members, Michael Spaney from DIG said they were "nicely maneuvered out" of the hall (though they were "lashing out"), while the BDS activists said Stavit Sinai was punched in the face. Ronnie Barkan said that a video shown to the judge during the trial showed the moment Sinai was punched.

== Criminal proceedings ==
The Berlin branch of DIG filed a criminal complaint against the three BDS activists. The complaint says the BDS activists launched tirades exceeding their permitted speaking time and interrupted Lavie's talk.

The complaint also alleges Stavit Sinai "swung [her fists] wildly around her and attendees" as she was escorted from the university room for disrupting the event; and that she "continuously attempted to reenter the lecture hall and pounded on the door", and that a member of DIG positioned himself by the door to block her reentry.

In August 2017, the spokesman for Humboldt University told the press that the university had filed a criminal complaint as early as June 27, following the DIG complaint from June 26.

After more than three years, on August 3, 2020, the court dismissed the trespassing charges. Barkan and Abusalama were acquitted of all charges; however, Sinai was found guilty of assault because of her pounding on the door of the lecture hall, which reportedly caused injuries to two people, and sentenced to a fine of 450 euro. Barkan and Abusalama said Sinai was trying to reenter the hall to find out the identity of the person who had punched her in the face.

== Reactions ==
=== Media ===
The day after the verdict, B.Z., a tabloid newspaper, published an article titled Disgusting hatred of Jews in and in front of the Berlin courtroom (Widerlicher Judenhass in und vor Berliner Gerichtssaal). The article portrayed the lecture disruption as "sheer hatred of Jews" and the entire 2017 event as an "event with a Holocaust survivor". Aliza Lavie was not mentioned. Ronnie Barkan was described as "Slovak, according to his own information also in possession of Israeli citizenship" and Stavit Sinai as "Romanian, allegedly also an Israeli citizen". (in fact both of them are Israeli Jews)

The Jerusalem Post followed suit with an article titled BDS ‘Jew-hater’ convicted for violent assault in Germany. The article reads: "A Berlin court convicted on Monday a Boycott, Divestment and Sanctions activist for assaulting people during a presentation by an Israeli survivor of the Holocaust at Humboldt University in the capital". The article continues to say, "In a dramatic setback to the claim of the BDS campaign that it is a nonviolent initiative targeting the Jewish state, the Berlin court declared Stavit Sinai guilty for her violent conduct".

=== Officials ===
Uwe Becker, who is the Hesse commissioner to combat antisemitism and also the deputy mayor of Frankfurt, praised the conviction of Sinai as "an important success against the violent character of BDS and its supporters". "It unmasks the violent character of the BDS movement, because it shows that even Holocaust survivors are attacked by BDS when they speak out for the Jewish state", said Becker. (the Holocaust survivor was neither attacked nor criticized during the incident)
