= Association for Civil Rights in Israel =

Israeli human rights organization

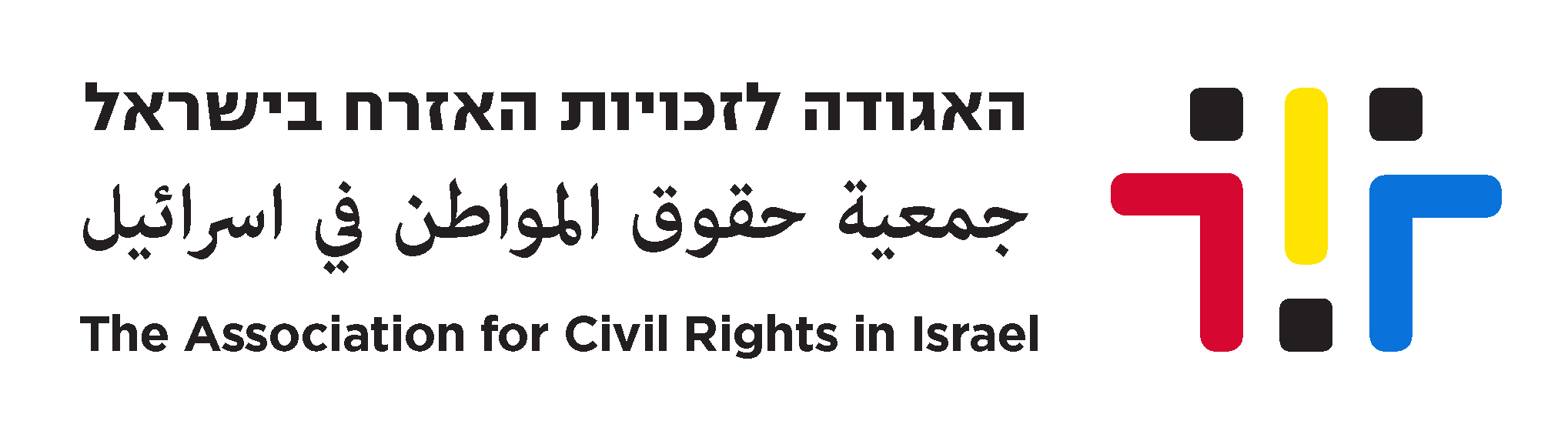
- Founded: 1972; 54 years ago
- Type: Non-profit; NGO
- Purpose: To ensure Israel's accountability and respect for human rights, by addressing violations committed by the Israeli authorities in Israel, the Occupied Territories, or elsewhere.
- Location(s): Tel Aviv, Israel (Headquarters); Jerusalem (Field Office); Nazareth (Field Office)
- Region served: Israel and the Palestinian territories
- Method: Legal and Policy Advocacy, Education, and Public Outreach
- Key people: Sami Michael, President; Noa Sattath, Executive Director; Attorney Dan Yakir, Chief Legal Counsel
- Website: www.english.acri.org.il

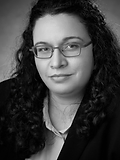
Noa Sattath, Executive Director of ACRI

The Association for Civil Rights in Israel (ACRI) (Hebrew: האגודה לזכויות האזרח בישראל, romanized: HaAgudah LeZkhut HaEzrakh BeYisrael; Arabic: جمعية حقوق المواطن في اسرائيل, romanized: Jamʻīyat Ḥuqūq al-Muwāṭin fī Isrāʼīl) was created in 1972 as an independent, non-partisan not-for-profit organization with the mission of protecting human rights and civil rights in Israel and the territories under its control. ACRI is Israel's oldest and largest human rights organization. Headquartered in Tel Aviv, with offices in Jerusalem, and Nazareth, the organization promotes transparency and accountability in government.

ACRI has been accused by critics, including former Prime Minister Yitzhak Rabin, of defending terrorists.

== History ==
Established in 1972, ACRI views itself as being "committed to promoting the universality of human rights and defending the human rights and civil liberties of all, regardless of religion, nationality, gender, ethnicity, political affiliation, sexual orientation, or socioeconomic background." The association established its views based on the basic rights recognized in the Universal Declaration of Human Rights, adopted by the United Nations General Assembly in 1948, and the values in Declaration of the Establishment of the State of Israel.

In 1981, ACRI instituted a human rights award to be given to "individuals and organizations that have made an outstanding contribution to the advancement of human rights in Israel". The award was renamed in 1983 as the "Emil Grunzweig Human Rights Award."

In 2009, ACRI organized what has become an annual "Human Rights March" to mark International Human Rights Day (December 10) in Tel Aviv.

== Activity ==
ACRI's Legal Department argues cases before the Supreme Court of Israel, and also seeks redress before district and labor courts, government ministries, and Knesset committees.

ACRI's Education Department conducts human rights training programs, produces educational curricula in Hebrew and Arabic, and organizes conferences and lectures on human rights education. Additionally, ACRI operates a program on International Humanitarian Law (IHL) and offers IHL educational workshops to social activists, students, educators, youth movement counselors, and students at pre-military academies to "enhance the participants’ knowledge of IHL, and to provide opportunities for discussion and for developing their positions on the issues involved."

ACRI publishes reports and information leaflets; organizes lectures, conferences, film screenings and other public and community events covering a wide range of human rights issues; and runs a public hotline to assist people whose rights have been infringed.

Internationally, ACRI submits shadow reports and provides information to UN committees and representatives regarding Israel’s compliance with its human rights obligations; meets with foreign diplomats and government representatives; participates in international conferences and NGO networks; and raises awareness of human rights issues by generating ongoing international media coverage.

ACRI focus on issues pertaining to Arab Minority Rights, Anti-Democratic Initiatives, Freedom of Expression, LGBT Rights, East Jerusalem, Human Rights Defenders in the Occupied Palestinian Territories (OPT), Migrant Workers, Child Rights, Negev Bedouins, Refugees and Asylum Seekers, Right to Health, Women's Rights, and the Right to Housing.

ACRI deals also with freedom of expression and the right to demonstrate. The association has initiated many legal actions to establish the right to demonstrate and the rights of demonstrators.

== Criticism ==
Though ACRI does not identify itself politically, activities of the association has been criticized as assisting organizations that harm Israel's national security. Such criticism was made by prime-minister Yitzhak Rabin over an appeal about exiling 400 Hamas activists to Lebanon in 1992. Rabin Called ACRI - "Association for Rights of Hamas". On the other side of the political spectrum, right-wing activists have called it "Association for Palestinian Civil Rights".

In November 2017, Education Minister Naftali Bennett cancelled a conference to be held in cooperation with ACRI following a letter sent by a group of bereaved families accusing ACRI of defending terrorists. ACRI denied the allegations and stated that it does not defend terrorists during their criminal proceedings, rather only in regards to their rights in prison and matters of citizenship and residency.

== The Emil Grunzweig human rights award ==
The Emil Grunzweig Human Rights Award is awarded annually by Association for Civil Rights in Israel to "individuals and organizations that have made an outstanding contribution to the advancement of human rights in Israel". The award was established in 1981 as an initiative by Professor Jacob Lorch, but was renamed in 1983 after the murder of activist Emil Grunzweig by a grenade thrown by a right-wing Israeli extremist during a Peace Now demonstration against the war in Lebanon.

=== List of recipients ===
Recipients of the award have included:

Year	Recipient	Title/Occupation	Contribution
1981	Gabriel Stern	Journalist for Al Hamishmar	For "expanding awareness of the need to safeguard the basic liberties of all citizens."
1982	Yehuda Litani	Ha'aretz reporter in the Occupied Territories	For "covering the IDF-administered territories [and] highlighting the situation of the residents of those territories to the Israeli public."
1982	Robert Weltsch	A Jewish journalist in Germany	"For his contribution to defending the rights of Jews during the beginning of the Nazi regime [and], after his aliyah in 1938, … fight[ing] for civil rights, especially those of non-Jews."
1983	Dov Yermiya	Peace Activist	For his activities promoting the welfare of civilians in Lebanon; this was the first year the award was named after Emil Grunzweig.
1984	Moshe Negbi	Editor of the radio program Din U'Dvarim	For his program which serves as "the sole media platform that consistently covers new legislative acts and landmark court rulings" and which has "introduced the general public to the subject, and has deepened their awareness of the importance of civil liberties and democratic values."
1985	Baruch Meiri	Journalist for Ma'ariv	For covering "precisely those strata of society that are weaker among us" and for his articles that "indeed uplift the hearts of the oppressed."
1986	Yitzhak Zamir	Former Attorney General	For each of his actions as Attorney General which were "rooted in a deep inner conviction of the primacy of the rule of law," and "for the consistent and sympathetic ear to human rights arguments demonstrated by the Attorney General and his staff."
1987	High Court Justice Zvi Berenson	Former Supreme Court Judge	For a "long list of rulings and determinations" which "laid down the foundations for proper governmental administration, as well as effective monitoring of that administration by the courts."
1988	Reporters covering the Occupied Territories	News Reporters	For "providing the Israeli public with up-to-date and accurate information, which is essential to the struggle for human rights" with regards to the Occupied Territories, following the outbreak of the First Intifada.
1989	Alice Shalvi	The founder of the Israel Women's Network	For founding the Israel Women's Network, and for her "important contribution in Israel to strengthening civil rights and women's rights in particular."
1990	Yitzhak Kadman	Head of the Israel National Council for the Child	For his work, particularly as Director and Founder of the National Council for the Child, serving as the "leading body that acts on behalf of the welfare of children in Israel."
1991	Lotte Saltzburger	A founder of HaMoked: Center for the Defence of the Individual	For her work with HaMoked dealing "on an ongoing basis with the adversity of daily life for numerous people living under military rule, by bringing individual cases before the authorities for clarification and resolution."
1992	Bassem Eid	The founder of the Palestinian Human Rights Monitoring Group	For standing "at the front lines of the struggle for human rights, both as a journalist and as a fieldworker and researcher for B'Tselem" and for never hesitating "to call out the Israeli authorities or the Palestinian organizations that bear direct or indirect responsibility for these abuses."
1992	James Ya'acov Rosenthal (special award)	Journalist	For his lifelong devotion to human rights.
1993	Eyal Simhoni	Former Director of the Execution Office	For his work as Director of the Execution Office and as a private attorney attempting to ensure due process for debtors referred to the Execution Office.
1994	Yitzhak Clinton Bailey	Campaigner for Bedouin rights	For "his extensive range of activities and many years of work to preserve the dignity, uplift the spirit, and help the members of Israel's Bedouin tribes to realize their rights."
1995	Women Against Violence	A foundation for aid to women and girls victims of violence in the Arab sector	For "the organization's work to provide counseling and support for female victims of violence and to protect women and girls from violence and injury by establishing shelters," as well as "work to promote equality between women and men, both on the familial and societal level" by developing "a discourse and culture of human rights in Israeli society, especially among the Arab sector."
1996	Gideon Levy	Ha'aretz journalist	"For his firm stance on human rights and respect for human dignity, especially of the oppressed and persecuted, regardless of nationality or religion. And for his impressive articles, which are written with exceptional style and grace and have awakened the nations conscience and call for a correction of its wrongs."
1997	Community Advocacy	A legal organization that assists residents of impoverished neighborhoods in obtaining their rights	"For recruiting and supervising numerous volunteers to train neighborhood residents to demand and exercise their social and economic rights, and for mediating between residents in order to build a better society that meets their common goals."
1997	The Juarish Family	Parents of Ali Muhammad Ibrahim Juarish (8 years old)	For agreeing to donate the organs of their son, killed by Israeli Defence Forces fire, to recipients both Jewish and Arab.
1998	Kav LaOved (Workers' Hotline)	Worker's Hotline	For "taking on the mission of defending the rights of workers, who are unable to stand up on their own for their individual and collective rights" and for "standing beside these workers with guidance and encouragement, and showing concern for their basic human needs."
1998	Aluf Hareven (lifetime achievement award)	Former Intelligence Office and Foreign Ministry Official	"For devoting his life to the struggle for human dignity and human rights."
1998	Shulamit Aloni (lifetime achievement award)	Former Member of the Knesset and Cabinet Member	For serving as "an enthusiastic and tireless warrior for civil and human rights."
1999	Physicians for Human Rights - Israel and its founder Ruchama Marton	An organization devoted to the right of all to adequate health services	For activities to "safeguard the right to health, both physical and mental, and for protecting the well-being of the needy, the tortured, and the oppressed in Israel and in the Occupied Territories."
2000	Dr. Joseph Algazi	Ha'aretz journalist	"For devoting his journalistic work to protecting and promoting human rights, and for the many years he has spent visiting the homes of the helpless, the persecuted, and the bereft, and for awakening the public conscience to hear their plight."
2001	Hotline for Refugees and Migrants	An organization striving to preserve the rights of migrant workers, victims of human trafficking, and asylum seekers	For helping "to protect the rights of migrant workers by operating an advisory hotline, visiting detention facilities, and providing free legal aid," and for operating "as an advocacy group, seeking to influence public opinion and government policy."
2002			
2003	Machsom Watch	An organization of Israeli women who monitor checkpoints	For "their steadfast monitoring of Israeli security forces at the checkpoints in the Occupied Territories during a period characterized by general apathy and desensitization to the human rights of Palestinians; for their interventions to prevent suffering and injury, which often saves human life; for their perseverance and dedication to alleviating the plights of Palestinians at checkpoints; and for building bridges between peoples and helping to maintain the humanity of Israeli society."
2004	Hannah Safran	Feminist and Peace Activist	For "her extensive activities aimed at promoting the status of women, protecting their rights, and achieving justice and equality; for her work to ensure the right to representation of all women, regardless of ethnicity, nationality, or sexual orientation; for her contribution to the establishment of organizations committed to advancing the rights of women, social justice, and the defense of human rights; (and) for her unwavering commitment to fighting all forms of social, economic, gender, and political oppression."
2005	Adva Center	Policy Analysis Institute	For its analysis and its "researchers' comprehensive and informative analyses of clearly presented data," without which "it would simply not be possible to criticize the government's policies and economic rhetoric, which serve to widen social gaps and severely threaten fundamental rights."
2006			
2007	Kolech ("Your Voice", fem.)	The religious Zionist feminist movement	For proving "a source of inspiration for the entire women's movement in Israel," and for placing "a host of pertinent issues such as the troubles women face within the rabbinical courts."
2008	Breaking the Silence (Shovrim Shtika)	An organization that collects and shares soldiers' testimony	For making "a bold and effective statement about the direct relationship between the daily practices of the occupation and the resulting abuse of human rights in the Territories," as well as "for its original contribution to and effective influence on the public discourse regarding the occupation; and for being one of the outstanding examples in recent years of a grassroots, civil society organization that is taking action in the face of the ongoing occupation."
2008	The Refugee Rights Clinic at Tel Aviv University	A Legal Clinic providing aid to asylum seekers and refugees	"For its partnership and leadership in the struggle to protect the human rights of asylum seekers and refugees in Israel, and for its unique ability to tap into academic forces and student energy in order to tackle this humanitarian crisis."
2009	Nir Katz	Social Activist and Youth Counselor	For his actions "guided by humanism and love," and for believing "in empowering and supporting others, especially young people, by providing them with the tools they needed to realize their potential so that they could contribute to society."
2009	Ruth and Paul Kedar of the Yesh Din	An organization for human rights	For demonstrating "strength, courage, and desire to work toward the safeguarding of democracy and toward a more for and just society," and for "a deep commitment to human rights, to accepting the other, and to helping those weaker and ourselves."
2010	Yehudit Tsur	Former judge of the Jerusalem District Court	For "numerous pioneering decisions (that) have advanced the right to equality and combated discrimination against Mizrahi Jews, the LGBT community, and the ultra-Orthodox, among others."
2010	Negev Coexistence Forum for Civil Equality and Oren Yiftachel	An organization which provides a framework for joint Jewish-Arab action and fights to promote a just solution for the Bedouin population	For standing "at the forefront of this (the Bedouin) struggle, both in the courts and in their courageous and steadfast stance with the residents."
2011	Keren Neubach	Journalist for Kol Israel	For placing "the institutionalized problems of Israeli society at the heart of the country's media discourse, including problems affecting disadvantaged groups whose voice cannot be heard elsewhere," and for exposing "the distortions of justice practiced by Israel's authorities at a time when many of her colleagues shun such stories."
2011	Tamar Pelleg-Sryck (lifetime achievement award)	Human Rights Lawyer	For dedicating "her work over the past twenty-five years to representing Palestinians in the Occupied Territories," and for "her intense work in a place where there are so many egregious violations of human rights."
2011	Koach La Ovdim: Democratic Workers' Organization	Trade Union	For changing "the self-perception of the worker community in Israel, and the consciousness of the state, employers, and the general public regarding the deeper meaning of collective organization."
2012	Tag Meir	Civil Society group	
2013	Sari Bashi	Co-founder of Gisha	

== Funding ==
Name of Donor	Amount as Contributed	Year and Duration
New Israel Fund (NIF)	$942,173	2011 over 12 months
New Israel Fund (NIF)	$724,792	2010 over 12 months
New Israel Fund (NIF)	$700,062	2008 over 12 months
The European Union	€200,000	2010 over 18 months
The European Union	€231,759	2009 over 24 months period
Sigrid Rausing Trust	£300,000	2011 over 36 months
War Child		2009
Diakonia		2011

As well as donations from individuals, foundations and other institutions.

== International network ==
ACRI is a member of the International Network of Civil Liberties Organizations (INCLO), a network of 13 independent human rights organizations around the world with the aim of advancing human liberty in their respective countries. The American Civil Liberties Union (ACLU) is among the oldest of the 13.

== Representative publications ==
- Overview of Anti-Democratic Legislation Advanced by the 20th Knesset (December 2017)--highlights recent political efforts to undermine gatekeepers of democracy and the Supreme Court of Israel among other efforts to curtail democracy and fundamental rights.
- 2012 State of Human Rights Report
- Social Rights Bill (November 2011)
- Unsafe Space: The Israeli Authorities' Failure to Protect Human Rights amid Settlements in East Jerusalem (September 2010)
- Failed Grade: The Education System in East Jerusalem 2010 (August 2010)
- The Infiltration Prevention Bill Lies and Reality (February 2010)

== See also ==
- Human rights in Israel
- Racism in Israel
