= Hannah Safran =

Israeli feminist

Hannah Safran חנה ספרן
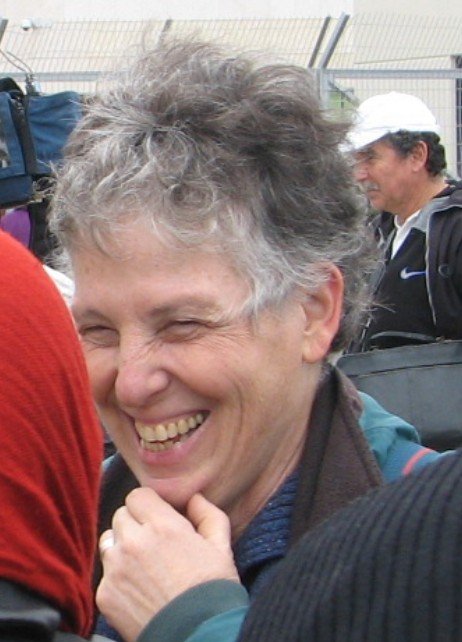
- Education: University of Haifa
- Occupations: Feminist activist and researcher

Hannah Safran (in Hebrew: חנה ספרן; born July 28, 1950) is an Israeli feminist, activist and researcher. She is one of the founders of the Coalition of Women for Peace and Women in Black.

== Education ==
Safran was born in Haifa, in 1950. She completed her BA in the History of the Jewish People and Biblical Studies at the University of Haifa in 1974. She began studying for her MA in political science at the London School of Economics, but did not complete her degree there. Later, in 1995, she received her MA from Simmons College in Boston, Massachusetts. She completed her PhD at University of Haifa in 2001. Her dissertation was on "The Influence of American Feminism on Women's Suffrage in the Yishuv Period (1926-1919) and the Women's Movement in Israel (1982-1971)". In 2002, she participated in a leadership training program at the Heschel Sustainability Center.

== Career ==
Safran is a prominent feminist activist and theorist, who has been involved in some of the most noted women's organizations and projects in Israel. She worked for Isha L'Isha The Haifa Feminist Center (part of the Haifa Women's Coalition) from 1987 to 1996, and continues to volunteer and do activism with the organization, where she also founded and runs the Center for Feminist Research. Her weekly column appeared in Isha L'Isha newsletter. She is a regular contributor of articles on feminism, sexual violence, and the occupation of Palestine in the Israeli press. She was one of the founders of the Haifa Battered Women's Shelter and the Hotline for Battered women.

Safran researches feminist history, and taught women and gender studies at the University of Haifa, Emek Yizrael College and the extension of Leslie University in Netanya which later became the Academic College for Arts and Society until her retirement in 2017. Her first book was published in 2006, Don't Wanna Be Nice Girls: The Struggle for Suffrage and the New Feminism in Israel. The book's title is inspired by a quote of one of the early feminist activist in Tel-Aviv in the 70's.

Safran resides in Haifa. She has two grown up children with her former partner. She now lives with her life partner and defines herself as a lesbian, "for as long as there is oppression of women's right to choose their own way of life and express their sexuality freely."

For her work to advance women's rights in Israel, Safran received the Emil Greenzweig Human Rights Award in 2004, from the Association for Civil Rights in Israel.

== Publications ==
=== Books ===
- Don't Wanna Be Nice Girls: The Struggle for Suffrage and the New Feminism in Israel, (לא רוצות להיות נחמדות: המאבק על זכות הבחירה לנשים וראשיתו של הפמיניזם החדש בישראל), Pardes Publishing, 2006 (Hebrew)

=== Chapters in books ===
- Safran, Hannah, "Alliance and Denial: Lesbian Protest in Women in Black", in Shadmi Erella and Chava Frankfort-Nachmias, (eds.), Sappho in the Holy Land: Lesbian Existence and Dilemmas in Contemporary Israel, SUNY Press, New York, 2005. pp. 191–202.
- Safran, H. (2008). International Struggle, Local Victory: Rosa Welt Straus and the Achievement of Suffrage 1919-1926, In R. Kark, M Shilo, & G. Hasan-Rokem (eds.), Jewish Women in Pre-State Israel (pp. 217–228). Waltham, MA: Brandeis University Press.
- Safran, H., & Chaikin, R., (2011). "Immigration, Women and Prostitution: the Case of Women from the Former Soviet Union in Israel", in Dalla, Baker, &, DeFrain (eds.) Global Perspectives on Prostitution and SexTrafficking (203-222). Lexington Books.
- חנה ספרן, רחלי הרטל, אורנה ששון-לוי, "הי[א]סטוריה לסבית מקומית: פעילות, מאבקים והישגים"' זכויות הקהילה הגאה בישראל: משפט, נטייה מינית וזהות מגדרית, 2016
- Hanna Safran, Racheli Hartal & Orly Sasson-Levy, "Local Lesbian Herstory: Activism, Struggles and Accomplishments".

=== Articles ===
- ספרן, ח. (2011). "פמיניזמ[ים], נשים ומגדר במרחב האקדמי", המשפט טז(2-1), עמ' 342-321. Safran, H. "Feminism(s), Women and Gender in Academic Spaces", HaMishpat
- Safran, H., (1995). "From denial to equal representation: women's peace groups and the creation of new feminist activism in ", Palestine-Israel Journal, II 3, p. 22-25.
