= Ruchama Marton =

Israeli psychiatrist

- רוחמה מרטון
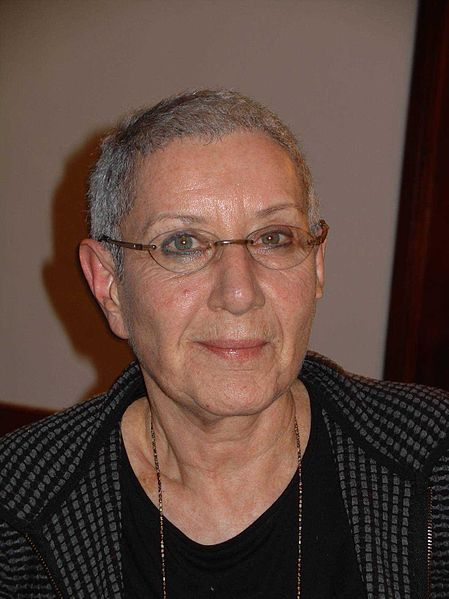
- Ruchama Marton in 2011
- Born: 1937 (age 88–89); Jerusalem, Mandatory Palestine
- Occupations: Psychiatrist, human rights activist
- Years active: 1962–present

Ruchama Marton (Hebrew: רוחמה מרטון; born 1937) is an Israeli psychotherapist, psychiatrist, and feminist, and the founder of Physicians for Human Rights-Israel.

== Early life and work ==
Ruchama Marton was born in Jerusalem, to Bilha and Aaron Smuelevitch who arrived from Poland in 1929. In Jerusalem she attended the Lämel School (often misspelled 'Lemel School'), a non-religious school for girls. Her family then moved to Tel Aviv, where she attended high school. She is the first cousin of Ada Yonath as their mothers were sisters.

During her military service, she was a soldier in the Givati Brigade and served during the Sinai War in 1956. She saw members of her regiment killed by friendly fire when the Israeli Air Force mistakenly bombed their positions and witnessed the murder of Egyptian prisoners of war who had surrendered and were unarmed by soldiers from the battalion in which she served In the battlefields of Sinai the first seeds of her anti-militarist (but non-pacifist) attitude and her lifelong commitment to fighting for human rights began. At a time when criticism of the army was practically unheard of, she openly protested the execution of the Egyptian prisoners.

After her military service, Marton studied medicine at the Hebrew University in Jerusalem and completed medical school in 1963. During this time, she gave birth to her daughter, Orna, and her son, Yuval. While a student in medical school, Marton became active in struggles for women's rights. Together with Professor Dreyfus, she organized activities to change the medical school's policy that only 10% of students could be women. Marton struggled with this policy for many years and was eventually successful. She also organized a fight against an existing ban that forbade female students from wearing pants. This battle almost cost her her place at the medical school, which was at the time the only medical school in Israel, though the university eventually removed the ban.

From 1974 to 1986 she worked as a senior psychiatrist at the Mental Health Center "Shalvata" in Hod Hasharon. While there, she tried along with Professor Davidson, director of the hospital, to promote community attitude and access, which was then not accepted in the field of psychiatry. Their idea was to create mental health clinics outside of psychiatric hospitals or centers where patients could go for care.

In her work at the hospital she initiated professional survey of private psychiatric hospitals in the Sharon area on a team that included a psychiatrist, a psychologist and a social worker. The goals of the study were to determine whether hospitalization is justified, whether the medication patients received was appropriate, and whether patients could be released if there was improvement in their mental state. This survey was the first of its kind in Israel.

From 1975 until 1990, she taught a post graduate program in psychiatry at the Institute of Psychotherapy at Tel Aviv University. At the School of Medicine she made extensive efforts, together with Professor Micha Neumann, director of the university clinic in the Shlvata hospital, to change the criteria for acceptance to medical school, so that a student's grades from humanities courses would bear equal weight to grades in math and the sciences. She believed that the change would improve the quality of the relationship between doctors and patients. In addition, for two years she directed a dynamic group of medical students in processing their experiences with patients in hospitals. After the success of these groups, group dynamics became an accepted part of training.

Along with her public activities, Marton pursued academic work in human rights and was a research fellow at the Mary Ingraham Bunting Institute at Radcliffe College of Harvard University from 1997 to 1998, as well as a Research Fellow for Peace and Human Rights at the Research Center for the Middle East at Harvard in 1998 and 1999, and human rights fellow and visiting scholar at the University of Chicago from 1999 to 2000.

== Public activities ==
Ruchama Marton has participated since 1962 in many organizations working in the field of human rights, promoting the right to health, the rights of women and the struggle for peace. From 1976 to 1990, she was a member of the Israeli-Palestinian Council for Peace, and was extensively involved promoting dialogue through seminars and meetings with representatives of the PLO. She was a volunteer in the Tel Aviv center for female victims of sexual assault and in another grassroots group called ELA, or Citizens for the Rights of the Hatiquva neighborhood.

In 1980–1981 she co-founded "Liberated Territories" - a group which published a weekly article in the Haaretz newspaper showing a radical view of the problems of Israeli society. In 1982 to 1984 she was a co-founder of the "Committee Against the War in Lebanon", which started opposition to the 1982 Lebanon War. In 1983 to 1984 she was a co-founder of "Alternative", a bi-national, extra-parliamentary organization that strove to promote peace through a two-state solution. In 1984 to 1987 she was a co-founder and a member of "Forum, Teachers from Tel Aviv University", an organization for peace and human rights. In 1988 she founded the Association of Israeli-Palestinian Physicians for Human Rights, later known as Physicians for Human Rights-Israel, a human rights organization working against the occupation of the Palestinian territories and defending the right to health. She served as the organization chairwoman for its first ten years. In 1989-1991 she was a co-founder of "Palestinians and Israelis Together for Peace," where she organized seminars and discussion groups to help advance the peace process. In 1989 she co-founded "The Public Committee Against Torture in Israel", which still exists today, and was designed to create a lobby to stop torture in Israel. She was one of the founders of the committee against the closure of Bir Zeit University and in 1989 she co-founded "Verification", an organization of mental health workers for peace.

In 1993 she co-founded One in Nine: Women for Women with Breast Cancer - a lobby and support group for women with breast cancer. In 2005 she co-founded the Committee for Political Prisoners. In 2006 she co-founded the Committee for the Rights of Residency. She was also a member of the International Committee for Palestinian NGOs.

Ruchama Marton was among the founders of the Progressive List for Peace, a bi-national party to the Knesset in 1984, which elected two representatives to the Knesset.

== Physicians for Human Rights ==
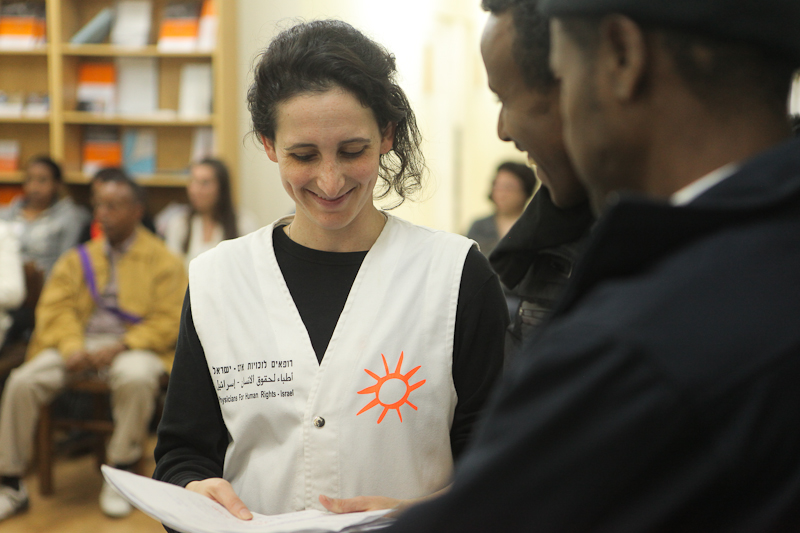
Physicians for Human Rights – Israel Open Clinic in Jaffa, 2010

In 1988 Marton founded the Association of Israeli-Palestinian Physicians for Human Rights, which later changed its name to Physicians for Human Rights-Israel (PHR-IL). She put together a group of Israeli and Palestinian doctors, working together in full equality and solidarity. The organization works towards a common goal of fighting against the occupation and promoting human rights and health. Physicians for Human Rights sees the occupation as a sickness, creating injustice and human rights violations. The organization works to maintain and defend human rights, with a focus on the right to health. Ruchama Marton bequeathed to the association a broader understanding of the concept of health - not just as medicine, but in the spirit of the World Health Organization - as "physical, psychological and social well-being" including access to water, sanitation, education, electricity, sewage, work, and free mobility.

PHR was the first Israeli NGO run by a woman, as well as the first that introduced the concept of human rights to the Israeli public, and through its activity along the years contributed much the public discourse about human rights. PHR-IL has worked to protect human rights in general, as well as the right to equitable healthcare and to bodily integrity, dignity and mental health.

In her public work, Marton has co-worked with Palestinian and international organizations dealing with mental health and human rights. She is on the board of the Mental Health Center in Gaza. PHR's partnership with organizations in Europe and the United States led to the "Network of International Organizations for Health and Human Rights" in 1992, of which Marton is a board member. She has been invited many times for meetings with the United Nations (in Geneva, Vienna, Strasbourg, New York City and more) to discuss and analyze the Israeli–Palestinian conflict.

== Awards ==
- 2019 Yeshayahu Leibowitz Award from the Yesh Gvul movement - award ceremony on April 2, 2019.

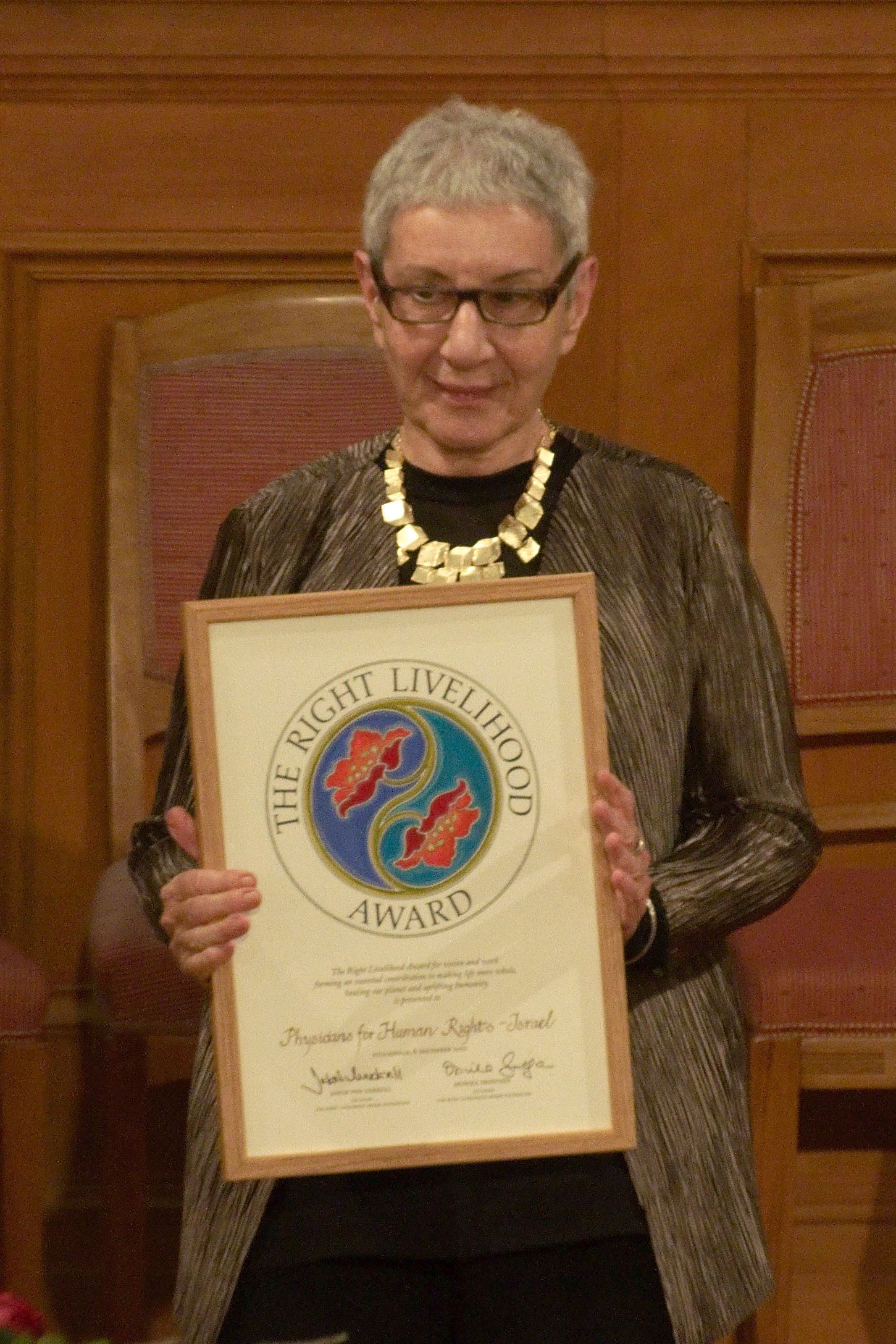
Ruchaama Marton with her Right Livelihood Award

- 2010 "Right Livelihood Award", PHR-IL, Stockholm, December 6, 2010.
- 2009 "Distinction of Honor" by the Jenin Refugee Camp Committee.
- 2007 "The American Friends Service Committee", one of 40 Palestinians and Israelis selected by AFSC Middle East peace building program, Faces of Hope, to honor contribution to ending the occupation and building a just peace. Chicago, June 2007
- 2007 "Women that Bring About Change", one out of 40 women selected by TheMarker, Tel Aviv, January 2007
- 2005 "1000 Women Nobel Peace Prize 2005", one of 1000 women nominated for the prize.
- 2005 "Alternative Independence Torch", May 11, Jerusalem, Presented by Yes Gvul Movement.
- 2002 "Jonathan Mann Award for Global Health and Human Rights", the Gates Foundation, May 30, Washington, D.C.
- 2000 Israeli Prime Minister Award: “Shield of the Child” was given to PHR Israel, November 26, Jerusalem
- 2000 "Helen Prize for Humanitarian Works, International Organization of the Helen Prize for Women", March, Montreal, Canada
- 1999 "Emil Grunzweig Human Rights Award", presented by the Association for Civil Rights in Israel
- 1998 The Mary Ingraham Bunting Institute of Radcliffe College, Harvard University, United States
- 1997 "Palestinian Award for Human Rights" Gaza City, October
- 1994 "Patient Friends Society" Tulkarem
- 1993 "Operation Smile International", Norfolk, Virginia.
- 1989 "Jewish Committee for Israeli-Palestinian Peace", Washington, D.C.

== Selected publications ==
- "Introduction" and a chapter in "The White Coat Passes like a Shadow: The Health Professions and Torture in Israel" in Torture: Human Rights, Medical Ethics and the Case of Israel, Neve Gordon and Dr. Ruhama Marton, eds, Zed Books, London, 1995
- Personal Profile, Journal of the American Medical Women's Association, Human Rights and Women's Health. Volume 52, Number 4, fall 1997.
- Marton, R. (1998), "Solitary Confinement as a Form of Torture", Vanunu and the Bomb, Israel: The Israel Committee for Mordechai Vanunu and for a Middle East Free of Atomic, Biological and Chemical Weapons
- Marton, R. (1999). "Doctors and the Duty of Intervention". Palestine–Israel Journal. 6 (1).
- Marton, R. (1999), "The Politics of Health Care in the Occupied Territories", in Gordon, Haim (ed.), Looking Back at the June 1967 War, London: Praeger
- Marton, R. (Fall 1999), "Building a Bridge of Mutual Respect", Radcliffe Quarterly, vol. 85, no. 2
- Marton, R. (2000). "A View from Within: Problems Confronting Human Rights Organizations in Israel and the Occupied Territories". Arab Studies Quarterly. 22 (1): 39–49. JSTOR 41858320.
- Marton, R. (March 2003). "About Loneliness and Radicalism" (PDF). Rethinking the Power of Aid: The Crisis of Humanitarian Action (Report). Medico International Report 25. Institute of Pedagogic, Frankfurt University. Archived from the original (PDF) on 30 March 2012.
- Marton, R. (May 2004). "The Psychological Impact of the Second Intifada on Israeli Society". Palestine-Israel Journal. 11 (1). Archived from the original on 2012-03-24.
- "The Right to Madness: From the Personal to the Political - Psychiatry and Human Right", a chapter in From the Margins of Globalization: Critical Perspective on Human Right, Neve Gordon, Editor, Lexington Books, Lanham, MD, 2004.
- "Tactics of oppression in the peace negotiations between Israel and the Palestinians: A feminist perspective". Sozial.Geschichte (2/2005). Archived from the original on 2011-04-08. Previous versions of this paper were presented at two conferences in 2002.
- Marton, R. (2005). "Transparent Wall, Opaque Gates". In Michael Sorkin (ed.). Against the Wall, Israel's Barrier to Peace. New York: The New Press.
- Marton, R. (August 2006). "What's Happening in Gaza?". Palestine/Israel News from Within. Vol. 22, no. 7.
- Marton, R. (November–December 2007), "Sight without Insight", Challenge, no. 106, archived from the original on 2011-07-22
- The Absolute Political Independence, the Condition of the Action, Revue Humanitaire/26, MDM, September 2010
- Marton, R. (2011). "Human rights violations during Israel's attack on the Gaza Strip: 27 December 2008 to 19 January 2009". Global Public Health. 6 (5). Routledge Taylor & Francis Group: 560–569. doi:10.1080/17441692.2010.551518. PMID 21390968. S2CID 205910949.
- Marton, R. (May 2011). "The Impact of Isolation on Mental Health". In Abeer Baker; Anat Matar (eds.). Threat - Palestinian Political Prisoners in Israel. London: Pluto Press.
