= Emil Grunzweig =

Israeli teacher and activist (1947–1983)

- אמיל גרינצווייג
- Born: December 1, 1947; Cluj-Napoca, Transylvania, Romania
- Died: February 10, 1983 (aged 35); Jerusalem, Israel
- Occupation: Teacher

Emil Grunzweig (Hebrew: אמיל גרינצווייג; December 1, 1947 – February 10, 1983) was an Israeli teacher and peace activist affiliated with the Peace Now movement. He became an icon of the Israeli left after he was killed by a grenade thrown at a peace rally in Jerusalem in 1983. In 1987, a nonprofit educational organization in Jerusalem was established in his name, called the Adam Institute for Democracy and Peace in Memory of Emil Greenzweig. The Emil Grunzweig Human Rights Award is awarded annually by the Association for Civil Rights in Israel.

== Biography ==
Emil Grunzweig was born in Cluj in Transylvania, Romania, to Olga and Shmuel Grunzweig. His mother was a survivor of the Nazi extermination camp Auschwitz. He had one brother, Eliezer. The family lived in France and Brazil for a time. After Shmuel Grunzweig died in France in 1963, the family immigrated to Israel. In Israel, the family settled in Haifa, where Emil attended the Hebrew Reali High School. After graduation, he was conscripted into the Israel Defense Forces, and joined a Nahal unit based on Kibbutz Revivim in the Negev. As a paratrooper in the IDF, he fought in the Six-Day War. He served as a reserve officer in the War of Attrition, the Yom Kippur War, and the 1982 Lebanon War.

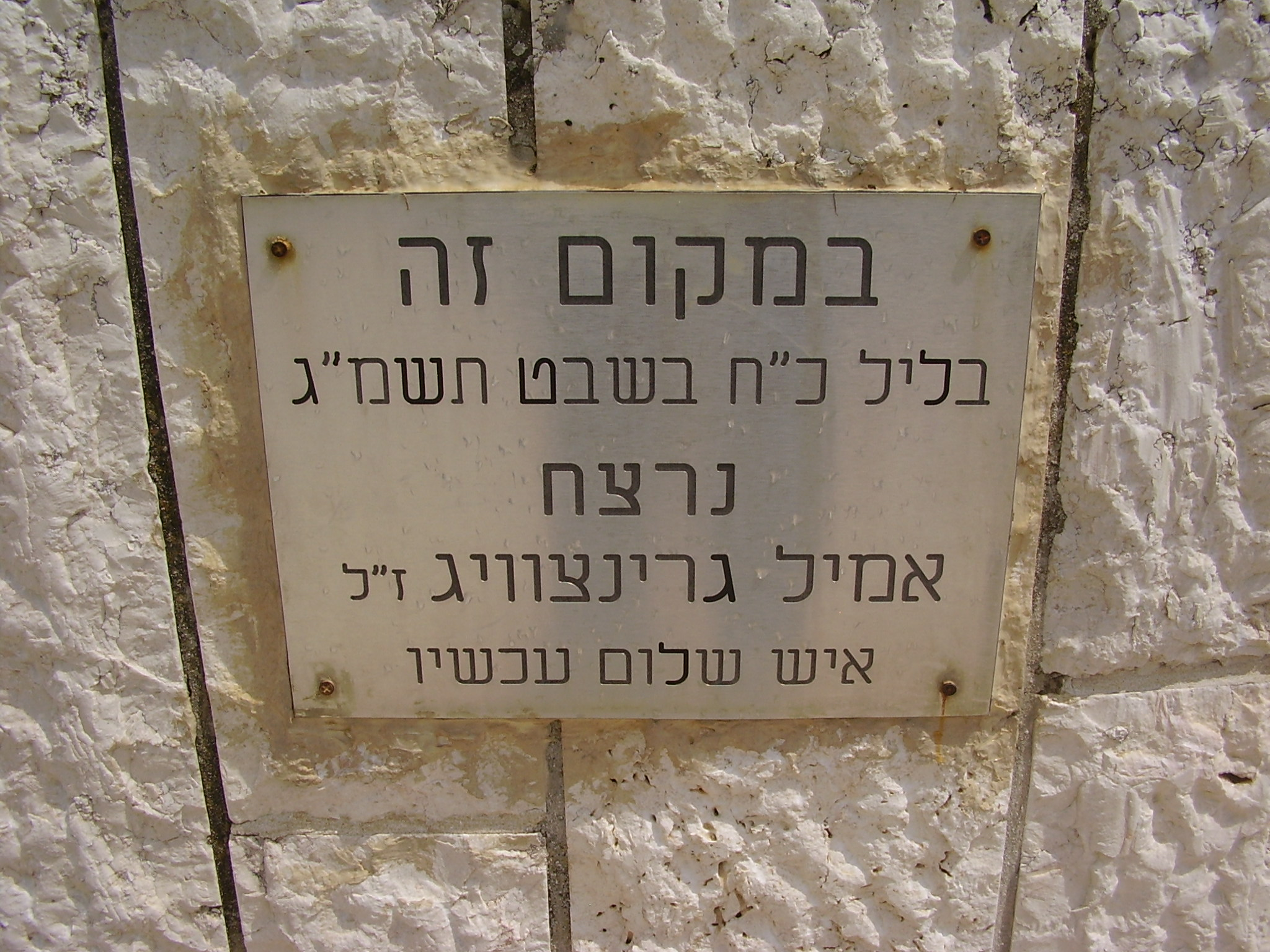
A commemorative plaque marking the spot in Jerusalem where Emil Grunzweig was killed

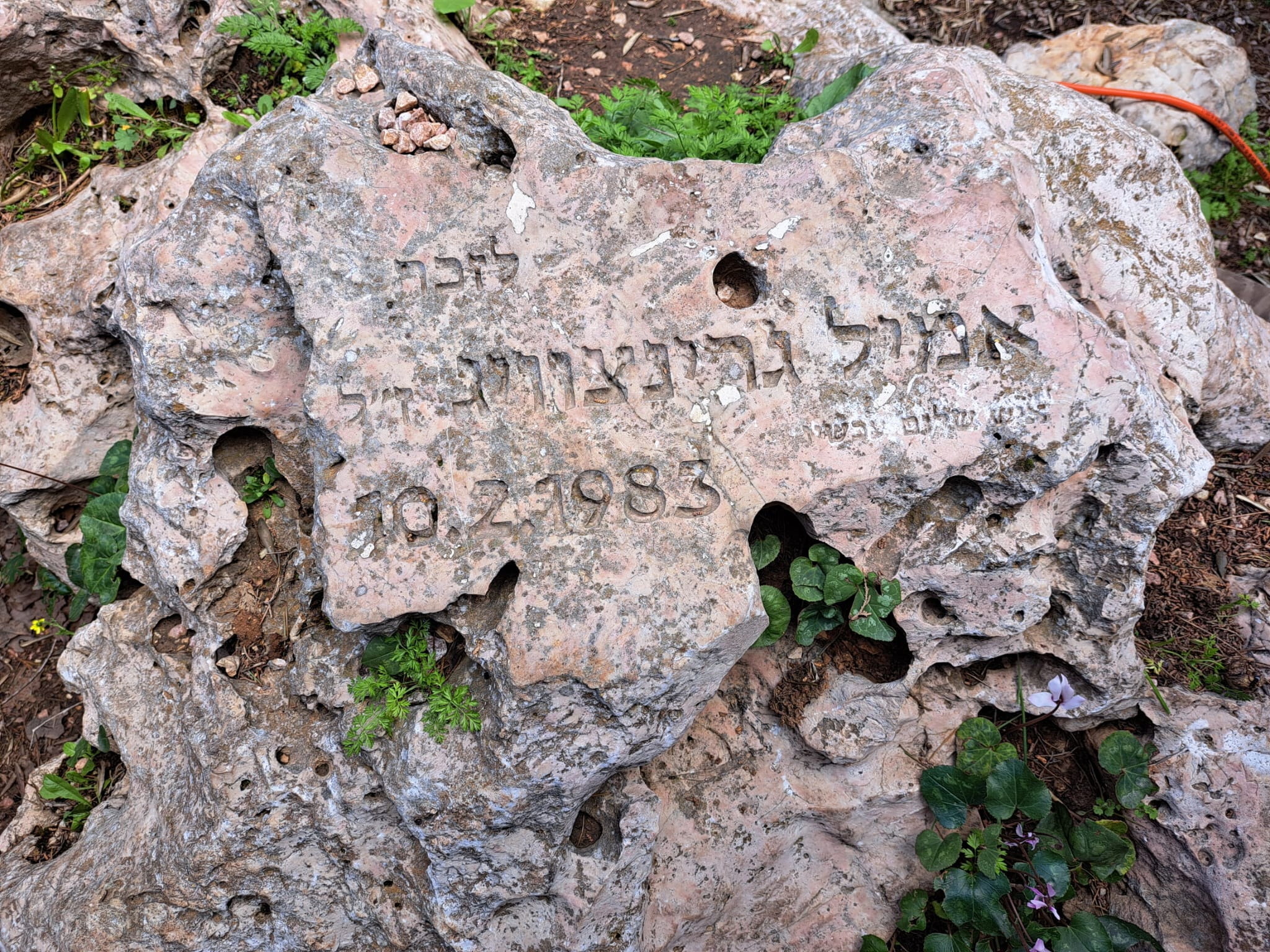
Emil Grunzweig memorial stone in Jerusalem rose garden

After his discharge from the army, he settled at Revivim, where he worked in the orchards. He studied mathematics and philosophy at the Hebrew University of Jerusalem. He taught mathematics and coordinated social activities at Maaleh haBesor high school at kibbutz Magen. He was involved in many educational projects including role-playing games with the students on issues such as the Arab–Israeli conflict, labor relations, and the relationship between religious cults and the state.

He moved to Jerusalem to complete a Master's degree in the history, philosophy, and sociology of science, at the Hebrew University of Jerusalem, and worked in educational projects at the Van Leer Jerusalem Institute. In this capacity, he organized joint Jewish–Arab summer camps to promote understanding between Jewish and Arab youths. According to philosopher G.A. Cohen, Grunzweig's closest friend was a young Palestinian man named Adeeb, who was also involved with the Van Leer Institute.

Grunzweig was married to Einat Ornan, and the couple had a daughter, Niva, who was four years old when he was killed. Grunzweig and Einat had divorced; at the time of his death he had a girlfriend, Ada Oren.

== Death ==
Grunzweig was killed on February 10, 1983, at a Peace Now rally outside the Jerusalem office of the Prime Minister. The protest was in support of the Kahan Commission's recommendation to investigate Israeli complicity in the Sabra and Shatila massacre. Grunzweig was killed from a grenade lobbed into the crowd by the right-wing extremist Yonah Avrushmi. Nine other peace activists were injured, among them future politicians Avraham Burg and Yuval Steinitz.

Avrushmi was arrested in 1984, convicted of murder in 1985, and sentenced to life in prison. In 1995, President Ezer Weizmann commuted the sentence to 27 years in prison. In 2005, Avrushmi's appeal for early release was denied by a Tel Aviv district court. Avrushmi was granted parole and released from Rimonim Prison on January 26, 2011.

== See also ==
- Emil Grunzweig Human Rights Award
- List of peace activists
