= Aliza Lavie =

Israeli academic and politician (born 1964)

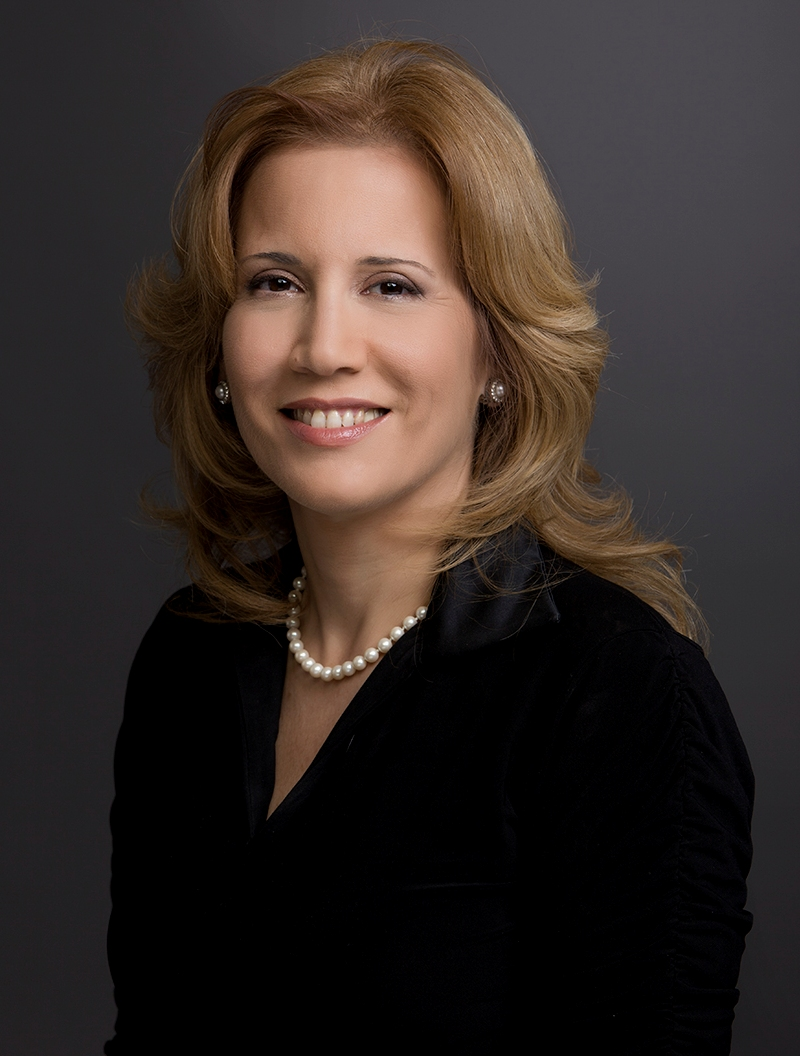

Faction represented in the Knesset
- 2013–2019: Yesh Atid

Personal details
- Born: 23 September 1964 (age 62) Kfar Saba, Israel

Aliza Lavie (Hebrew: עליזה לביא; born 23 September 1964) is an Israeli politician, author, and social entrepreneur. She served as a member of the Knesset for Yesh Atid between 2013 and 2019, and is currently a senior lecturer at the School of Communication at Bar-Ilan University and chairperson of the Israel Film Council. Her work focuses on gender issues and multiculturalism in Judaism and Israeli society.

== Early life ==
Lavie was born in Kfar Saba and attended the religious Bar-Ilan High School in Netanya, and was also a member of the Bnei Akiva youth movement. After graduation, she served in the IDF as an educator. Upon completing her service, she continued in a similar role in her work with the Society for the Protection of Nature in Israel.

== Academic career ==
Lavie studied at Bar-Ilan University, where she received a BA in 1988, an MA in 1997 and a PhD in 2002. From 2000 until her election to the Knesset in 2013, she served as a senior lecturer at the university's School of Communications. Her 2002 doctoral dissertation, "Israel Radio and Gender" dealt with the issue of gender newsreels and current affairs programs on public radio. She also spent a year as a research fellow at Brandeis University, analyzing media and gender and the cultural role of women in Judaism.

Until she began her work in the Knesset, Lavie headed the Center for Media and Religion at Bar-Ilan University. She also taught courses including Gender and Mass Communication, Radio as a Social Instrument, Media and Religion, and Advertising Products as Cultural Space.

== Public activities ==
Lavie's public activity began in 1988, when she became an advisor to Shaul Yahalom, then-political secretary of the National Religious Party. She was Executive Director of the Public Council for Youth Exchange between 1990 and 1996, and founder and chair of Matan (Beit Midrash) Netanya and A Voice (Religious Women's Forum), an organization which served as a founder of the Committee of Management and sexual harassment. Lavie is also a member of the Kolech forum for religious women and a board member of the "Izun" center for treatment and rehabilitation of youth in drug-related or spiritual crisis following backpacking trips overseas.

Lavie's social initiatives concern issues related to conversion. She is one of the founders of the Public Committee for Conversion, and one of the initiators of the petition filed in the High Court against the marriage official who refused to register the marriage of a woman who converted during her military service. She founded the J12&UP educational program and served as chair of the Herzl Museum.

== Political career ==
Prior to the 2013 Knesset elections, Lavie joined the new Yesh Atid party led by Yair Lapid, and was placed seventh on the party's list. She was elected to the Knesset as the party won 19 seats, and became Chairwoman of the Committee on the Status of Women and Gender Equality. She was also a member of the Finance committee, the National Security and Foreign Affairs Committee, and the House Committee in the 19th Knesset.

She was placed tenth on the party's list for the 2015 elections, and was re-elected as the party won 11 seats. Lavie became a member of the Committee on the Status of Women and Gender Equality and head of the Subcommittee on Human Trafficking and Prostitution. She also served on the National Security and Foreign Affairs Committee, the Ethics Committee, and the House Committee and headed the Knesset caucus on religion and state. In July 2015, she was named "Outstanding Member of Knesset" by the Israel Democracy Institute, for her activities in the 19th parliamentary session.

Prior to the April 2019 elections Yesh Atid joined the Blue and White alliance, with Lavie placed 38th on the alliance's list. She lost her seat as Blue and White won 35 seats.

== Personal life ==
Lavie married attorney Zuriel Lavie in 1987, after which the couple served as emissaries of Bnei Akiva in Durban, South Africa. They have four children and live in Netanya.

== Books ==
- A Jewish Woman’s Prayer Book, 2005, Yedioth Books (Hebrew); 2008, Random House (English); 2010, Morasha (Italian). A collection of prayers which draw from a variety of Jewish traditions; the English translation won the 2008 National Jewish Book Award.
- The Jewish Backpack, 2010 (Hebrew). Yedioth Books.
- Women’s Customs – A Feminine Mosaic of Customs and Stories, 2012 (Hebrew). Yedioth Books.
- Hours of Devotion: Fanny Neuda’s Book of Prayers for Jewish Women, 2013 (Hebrew), Yedioth Books.
- To Be a Jewish Woman, 2005 (Hebrew), co-edited with Tova Cohen. Kolech.
- Achshav Torech ('Now It's Your Turn: Your Bat Mitzvah Journey'), 2021, Kinneret Zmora-Bitan Dvir.
- Iconic Jewish Women. Fifty-Nine Inspiring, Courageous, Revolutionary Role Models for Young Girls, 2024, (English, Gefen Publishing).
