= Zvi Berenson =

Israeli jurist (1907-2001)

- צבי ברנזון
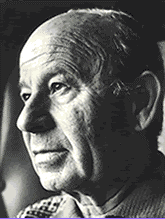

Judge of the Supreme Court of Israel
- In office 1954–1977

Personal details
- Born: 26 February 1907 Safed, Ottoman Empire (Now Israel)
- Died: 30 January 2001 (aged 93) Tel Aviv, Israel
- Spouse: Hannah Wolf
- Children: Ilana, Chaim
- Education: Scottish College of Safed; University of Cambridge
- Occupation: Jurist, judge
- Known for: One of the writers of the Israeli Declaration of Independence
- Awards: Emil Grunzweig Human Rights Award (1987)

Zvi Berenson (Hebrew: צבי ברנזון; February 26, 1907 – January 30, 2001) was an Israeli jurist who served as a judge on the Supreme Court of Israel. He was one of the writers of the Israeli Declaration of Independence in 1948.

== Early life ==
Berenson was born in Safed to a family of merchants. In his youth he studied in a cheder and yeshiva before studying at a boys' elementary school from 1919 to 1922, and then studied at the Scottish College of Safed until 1926. He continued to study mathematics and physics and received a doctorate in sciences in 1929. He taught mathematics and Hebrew at the Scottish College of Safed from 1929 to 1931 before receiving a grant from the British Mandatory government to study in the United Kingdom. He moved to the United Kingdom in 1931 to study mathematics and law at the University of Cambridge.

Berenson married Hannah Wolf in 1931 and had two children, Ilana and Chaim. His son Chaim would later follow in his father's footsteps and open law firm in Herzliya. He and his wife were vegetarians.

== Legal career ==
After returning to Palestine, he specialized in the law firm Zmora Korngold and Bar-Shira and received a law license. He served as a legal adviser to the Histadrut labor federation from 1934 to 1948. In 1948, he prepared the first draft for the Israeli Declaration of Independence. Berenson also helped prepare recommendations for labor laws and national insurance programs in the new state.

In 1950, Berenson was named Director-General of the Ministry of Labor, and he was appointed a judge on the Supreme Court of Israel in 1954. He also headed the Israeli delegation to the International Labor Union from 1958 to 1959. Berenson served on the court for 23 years before retiring in 1977. His main contributions were in administrative law, public tenders, torts, labor law, and family law. In 1987, the Association for Civil Rights in Israel awarded him the Emil Grunzweig Human Rights Award for a "long list of rulings and determinations" which "laid down the foundations for proper governmental administration, as well as effective monitoring of that administration by the courts."

== Later life ==
After his retirement from the court, he served as Chairman of the Arbitration Board for the Public Sector for 17 years until 1994. He died in 2001 at the age of 93.
