= Kolech =

Orthodox feminist organization in Israel

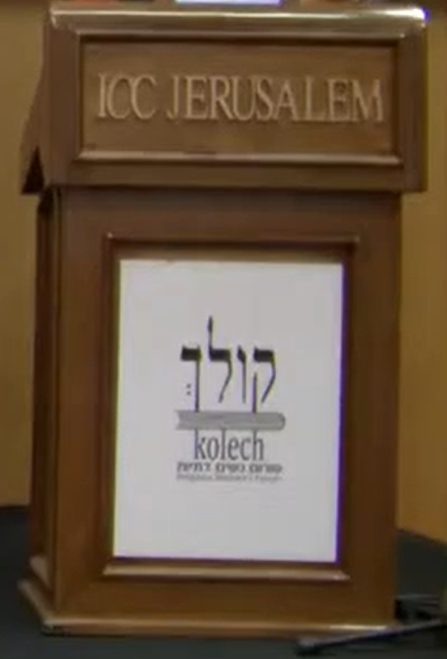
- Kolech organization at the International Conference Center in Jerusalem
- Formation: 1988
- Founder: Chana Kehat
- Type: Nonprofit
- Registration no.: 580328136
- Legal status: Charitable organization
- Purpose: Promoting the status of Jewish women in Israel, and advocacy in the areas of Jewish family law, religious education
- Location: Jerusalem, Israel
- Coordinates: 31.7617601°N 35.1732309°E
- Award: Emil Grunzweig Human Rights Award (2007)
- Website: www.kolech.org.il/en/

Kolech (Hebrew: קוֹלֵךְ), also known as Kolech: Religious Women's Forum (Hebrew: קולך: פורום נשים דתיות), is an Israeli women's organization associated with Orthodox Judaism. The group's stance is aligned with Orthodox Jewish feminism and religious Zionism.

== Founding ==
The group was established in 1998, and it describes its mission as advancing the status and rights of Jewish women in the areas of religious law, leadership, and community life. The group's founder was Chana Kehat, a history and Jewish studies professor, who led the group from 1998 to 2004. The group was founded after Kehat attended the inaugural conference of Jewish Orthodox Feminist Alliance (JOFA) based in the United States (founded by Blu Greenberg in 1997). Other leadership associated with the group include Yael Rockman, an attorney, who served as Kolech Executive Director from 2015 until 2020. The organization is currently led by Efrat Shapira-Rosenberg, the granddaughter of Rabbi Shlomo Goren, a religious Zionist leader and former Chief Rabbi of Israel. The group reportedly has over one thousand members.

According to researchers, the social dynamic underlying the foundation and continued activities and support for organizations like Kolech is the tension experienced by women who practice Orthodox Judaism and are also educated and are drawn to feminism. For these women, there is a real obligation to observe Jewish ritual law and to adhere to institutional frameworks which are patriarchal in nature. The tension arises when these individuals want to continue to maintain uncompromising loyalty to their faith, families, and communities, however, at the same time, they want to modify the Jewish religious system to allow a new, egalitarian approach to emerge. The aim of Kolech is to produce new solutions to these social dilemmas, solutions that may possibly combine feminist concepts with patriarchal traditions.

== Activism ==
=== Women and Torah study ===
At the time of the founding of Kolech, the main activities were the establishment of conferences for religious women and the weekly publication of articles on Jewish topics, such as the weekly Torah portion. The agenda of Torah study by women and their recognition as Torah scholars is a continuous effort for group members. In 2016, Kolech launched an initiative called "Shabbat Dorshot Tov" which promoted women speakers and scholars in residence in dozens of synagogues across Israel. The project was formed in collaboration with Midreshet Lindenbaum, Matan Women's Institute for Torah Studies, Midreshet Ein HaNetziv, and the Beit Hillel association.

=== Supporting modern Orthodoxy ===
In 2010, Kolech and other modern Orthodox organization campaigned to prevent the dismissal of a director of rabbinic courts by a committee with a majority of members from ultra-Orthodox backgrounds. The move was understood as an attempt to prevent the increase of ultra-Orthodox control over rabbinic courts.

Following a decision made regarding the issue of women praying in a quorum at the Western Wall where a new egalitarian section was established. Kolech objected to the decision stating that Orthodox women who wish to pray in a quorum would only do so in the women's section of the Western Wall plaza, and could not do so in the egalitarian section, as under Orthodox ritual, prayer requires segregation of the sexes.

Kolech has initiated and support efforts to encourage the use of Jewish prenuptial agreements in religious marriage ceremonies in order to mitigate the issue of agunot ("chained marriages").

=== Advocacy against sexual harassment ===
In 2002, Kolech's activism took a significant turn toward advocating on behalf of the legal rights of Israeli religious women when it publicly backed the accusation of sexual harassment against a notable Israeli rabbi, and later against a second rabbi. The group faced opposition from Israeli rabbis who condemned the accusation. However, following the incident, Kolech collaborated with Israeli rabbis to formulate a code of conduct for religious educational institutions. Kolech's activism in this area continued after the event with a 2019 petition to the High Court to strip the rabbinical title of a rabbi convicted in 2013 and had committed to the rabbinical courts that he would refrain from holding any communal post within ten years of the conviction. Kolech's argument against the rabbinical court was that by allowing the rabbinical title to remain in place, the rabbinate failed to fully protect members of the public. The legal argument for the rabbinate rested on their position that the rabbi's commitment to abstain from leadership roles satisfied the concern at hand.

=== Kol Barama suit ===
In 2012, Kolech filed a discrimination suit against the Israeli ultra-Orthodox radio station, Kol Barama, which was founded in 2009 and had maintained a practice not to allow women's voices to be aired on their station. The group sought NIS 104 million in damages for discrimination against the station's female audience, in accordance with Israel's discrimination law passed in 2000. According attorney Yael Rockman, then Executive Director of Kolech, part of the argument against the radio station was that it was not a sole private entity but was receiving funds from the Israeli government. After Kolech's victory in the Supreme Court of Israel in 2015, the radio station filed an appeal. In 2018, the district court in Jerusalem ruled in favor of Kolech and issued a NIS 1 million fine (roughly $280,000) for the radio station to pay or risk losing its broadcast license. The fine would be split up by organizations supporting Orthodox Jewish women in Israel. In 2019, the station reportedly paid their required payment to Kolech in buckets filled with 10 agorot coins (₪1/10), Israel's smallest denomination in use.

=== Recognition ===
In 2007, the Israel Association for Civil Rights awarded Kolech for their advocacy for Orthodox Jewish women.

== Funding ==
The organization's annual budget is NIS 1 million. Funding for Kolech is from membership, donations, as well as financial support from various foundations such as New Israel Fund (NIF), and the Dafna Fund. In 2015, Kolech received NIS 70,000 from the Israeli Ministry of Justice.

== See also ==
- Women in Israel
- Feminism in Israel
- Jewish Orthodox Feminist Alliance
- Chochmat Nashim
