= Physicians for Human Rights–Israel =

Israeli human rights organization

- Founded: 1988
- Type: Non-profit; NGO
- Location(s): Based in Jaffa, Israel, operates in Israel and the Palestinian Territories
- Services: Humanitarian aid, advocacy
- Fields: Monitoring the Right to Health in Israel and the Palestinian Territories
- Members: 1,500
- Key people: Ruchama Marton, Tzvi Bentewich, Professor Raphi Walden, Dr. Mushira Aboo-Dia, Ran Goldstein
- Award: Right Livelihood Award
- Website: www.phr.org.il

Physicians for Human Rights–Israel (PHR-I or PHR-IL; Hebrew: רופאים לזכויות אדם-ישראל) is a non-governmental, non-profit, human rights organization based in Jaffa. Physicians for Human Rights–Israel was founded in 1988 with the goal of promoting "a just society where the right to health is granted equally to all people under Israel's responsibility."

PHR-I states that "principles of human rights, medical ethics, and social justice are at the core of our worldview," and is against what it maintains to be the "ongoing occupation of the Palestinian Territory." In September 2010, PHR-I was awarded the Right Livelihood Award "for their indomitable spirit in working for the right to health for all people in Israel and Palestine".

PHR-I founder and CEO, Ruchama Marton, supports the Boycott, Divestment and Sanctions movement and has received criticism from Israeli groups opposed to it. PHR-I's President is Professor Raphi Walden, a vascular surgery expert, board member of the Sheba Medical Center Tel HaShomer, and professor of medicine at Tel Aviv University, and the Chairman of the Executive Committee is Dr. Mushira Aboo-Dia, a gynecologist at Hadassah Ein Kerem hospital and winner of the Gallanter Prize for Social Justice. During July 2025, Physicians for Human Rights–Israel joined with B'Tselem in the publication of a report, assessing that Israel is committing genocide in Gaza.

== Principles of action ==
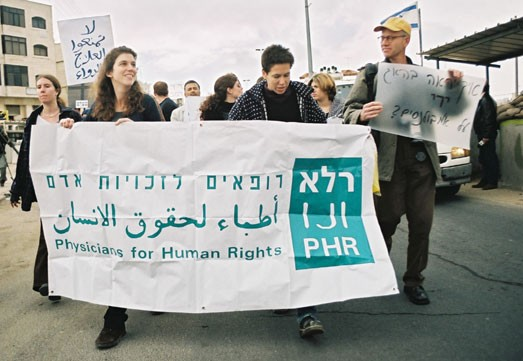
Physicians for Human Rights–Israel participating in an anti-occupation demonstration at the Qalandia checkpoint, March 2002

PHR-I's working guidelines are based on the concepts of medical ethics, social justice, and human rights. Much of PHR-I's work is based on appeals and testimonies from persons whose rights may have been violated. Such claims may come from the Occupied Palestinian Territories, the unrecognized Bedouin villages in the Negev, or from migrant workers, refugees and asylum seekers living in Israel. PHR-I advocates on their behalf through different established authorities such as the Israeli Prison Service, Kupat Holim Israel Health Services, the Israel Defense Forces, the Ministry of Health, and others and appeals to the court system when necessary. Additionally, PHR-I publishes reports on various human rights concerns, and operates two clinics; one for persons of no civil status located in Jaffa, Israel, and a mobile clinic operating 3-5 times per months in a number of towns in the West Bank.

PHR-I’s diverse staff and volunteer base are composed of Jewish and Arab medical professionals and human rights activists who are committed to changing Israeli government policies that allegedly restrict the right to health. According to their website, PHR-I has more than 1500 members, some of whom are health workers.

Physicians for Human Rights–Israel cooperates with other human rights and medical NGOs in Israel, the occupied Palestinian territories, and abroad. PHR-I is also in partnership with the Legal Clinics of the Tel Aviv University. Cooperation is based on universal human rights principles.

PHR-I retweeted a message calling for Israeli soldiers to refuse orders, during Operation Pillar of Cloud in November 2012.

== Departments ==
PHR is composed of four departments which conduct research and manage projects concerning patient and human rights.

=== Occupied Palestinian Territories Department ===
The OPT department conducts research on the violations of the right to health in the West Bank and the Gaza Strip. The department researches and publishes information regarding prevention of medical care from the Gazan population, limitations on the right to move and reside freely in the West Bank, Shin Bet interrogation of patients at Erez Crossing, and other cases. The OPT department takes individual cases to the District Coordination Office, the State of Israel, and the Palestinian Authority, in order to provide medical passes for Palestinians to enter Israel for treatment. The OPT department operates the Mobile Clinic in the West Bank.

=== Migrants Department ===
The migrants and undocumented people department strives to promote the right to health of immigrants and persons of no civil status living in Israel. This includes refugees and asylum seekers, migrant workers carrying or lacking a work permit, children who are not recognized as residents, victims of human trafficking, Palestinians, persons deprived of citizenship through the Law of Citizenship and Entrance to Israel, and even returning residents. The department handles personal claims of persons without civil status and aids them in achieving their rights through the different bodies of the State of Israel. The migrants department advocates for a reformation of Israel's immigration policies, and in particular acts to promote a social residency status which will differentiate between the right to health and civil status, and will guarantee access to decent medical care for all, regardless of civil class or status. Additionally, the migrants department promotes reforming the private medical insurance sector, and transferring immigrants' medical insurance policies to the public system. The department advocates for applying universal health care to all children living in Israel, for preventing the deportation of immigrants who suffer from complex or life-threatening illnesses, and advocates against the proposed Anti-Infiltration Law (which may result in up to 7 years detention for Asylum Seekers). The department operates the Open Clinic.

=== Prisoners Department ===
The Prisoners department caters to the inmate population in Israel. PHR-I receives and handles claims from detainees, criminal prisoners, or security prisoners who may have had their right to health violated while in jails, interrogation centers, or prisons. The prisoners department conducts research and publishes reports on prison health services, denial of medical treatment to inmates, torturing of inmates and physicians' collaboration with torture. As a left-wing organization, the department opposes the privatization of the Israel prison system, as it believes inmate care should not be handled by a for-profit company.

=== Residents of Israel Department ===
The main focus of the Residents of Israel department is the promotion of equality in availability and standards of health care in Israel. The department aims to identify concerns with the implementation of Israel's public health insurance law, and acts to create solutions to these problems. Issues addressed by this department include:

- A campaign to cancel co-pay fees on medical services and medications included in the official list of provided medical services in Israel.
- A campaign to diminish gaps in health and in the availability of health care between different groups within Israeli society; Jews and Arabs, urban and rural residents, upper and lower classes.
- A campaign to repeal amendments to the Israeli public health insurance law which may harm the public health system. Such amendments are often included in the Israeli Law of Arrangements.

The ROI department manages a case-specific project which handles violations of the right to health within the unrecognized Bedouin villages in the Negev. These villages are not recognized by the Israeli government. The project promotes the recognition of the villages as legitimate towns, which will guarantee their residents the right of access to medical services, infrastructure, development and public health maintenance. The project follows health services operating within the unrecognized villages, and appeals to relevant authorities or to the Israeli Supreme Court in order to provide residents of the villages with non-discriminatory health care and full civil rights.

== The Mobile Clinic ==
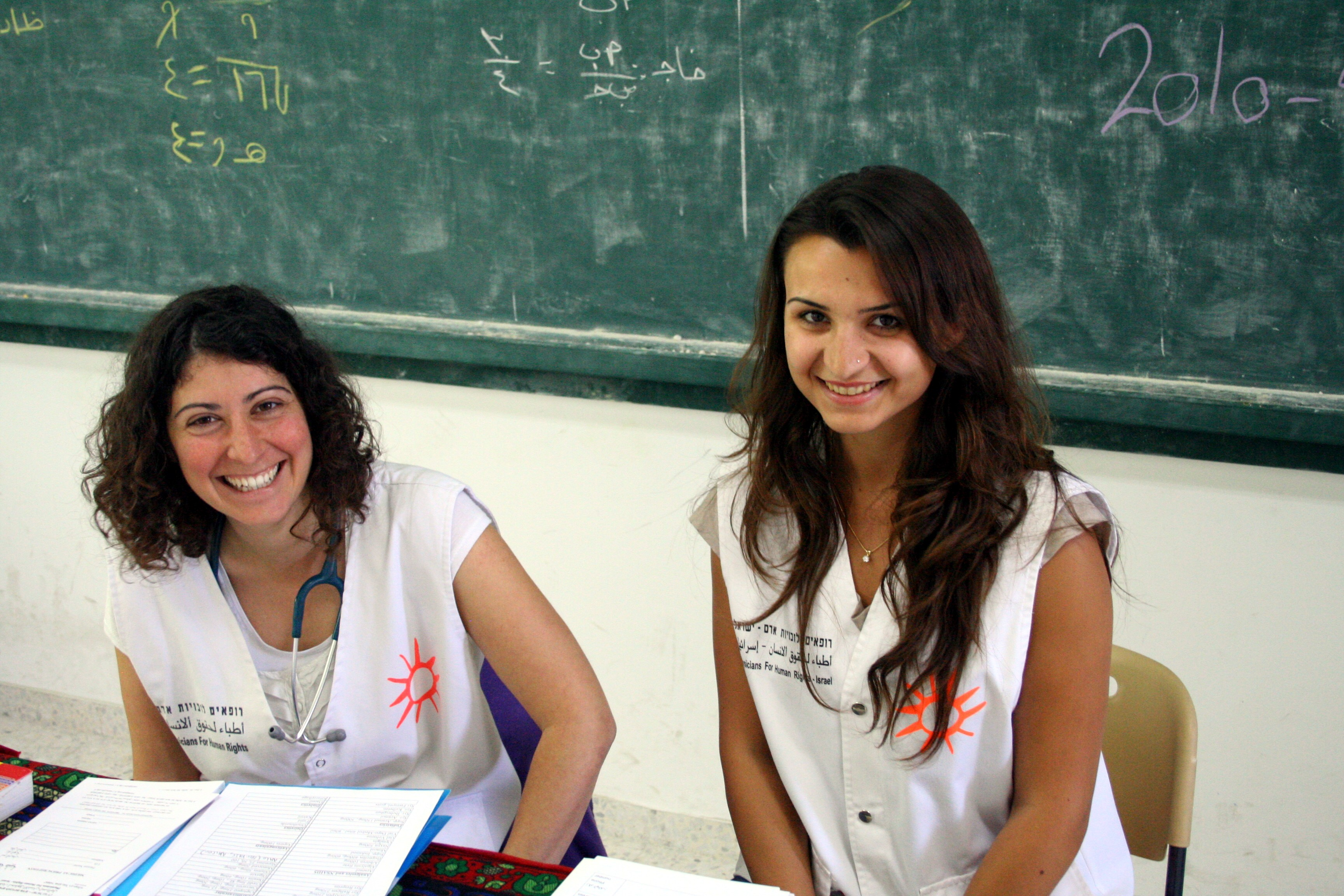
Mobile Clinic Medical day for women In Azbat Jarrad village, near Tul Karem, April 2010

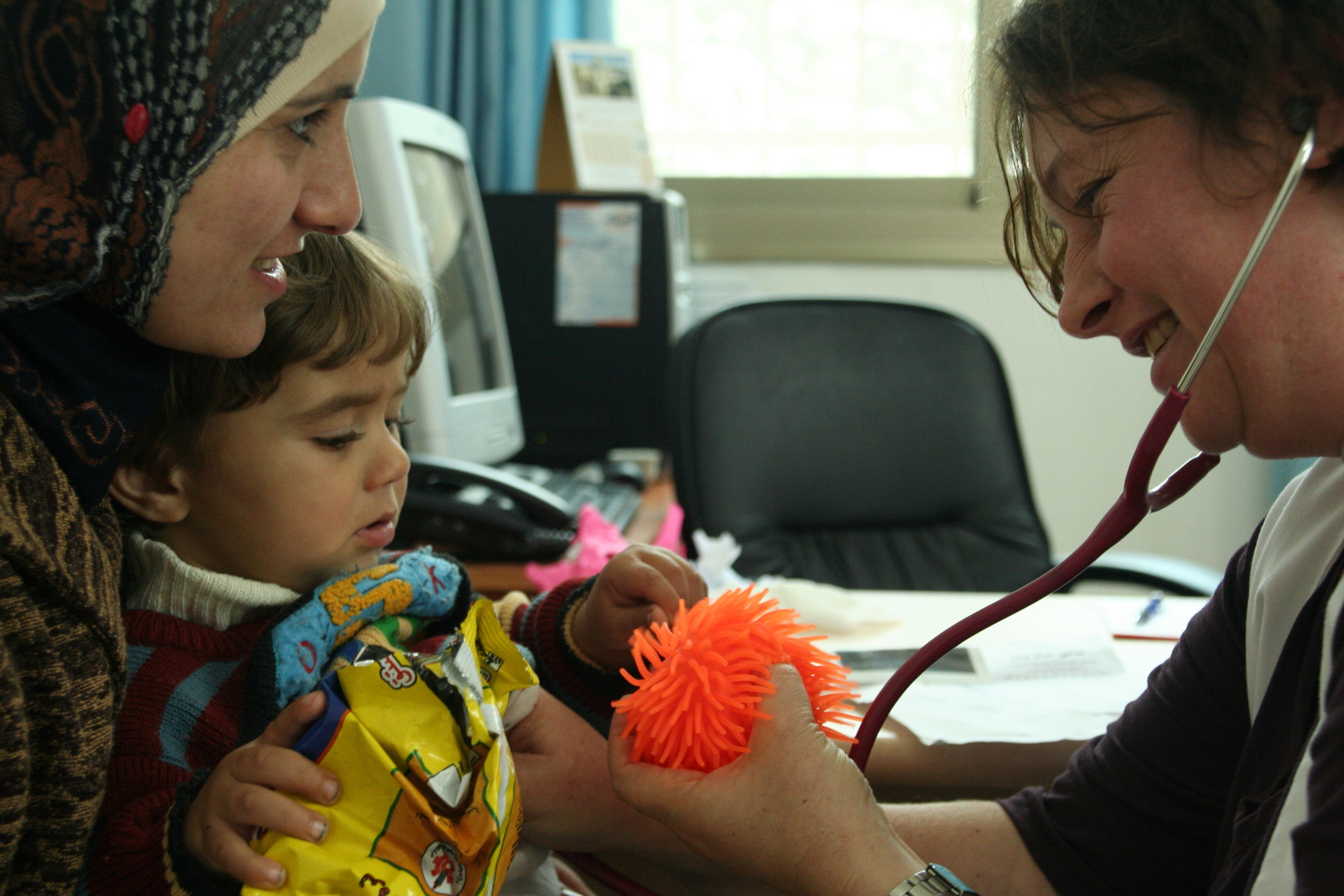
A medical examination during a PHR mobile clinic visit to Bruqin, February 2007

Physicians for Human Rights–Israel has operated the Mobile Clinic Project since its establishment in 1988, with the goal of addressing ongoing health issues in the Occupied Palestinian Territory. The Mobile Clinic brings together Israeli and Palestinian health professionals and active members of Palestinian civil society for weekly cooperative medical work in rural Palestinian villages. Within this setting, Israeli doctors provide immediate primary care and when necessary, referrals for follow up care, while Palestinian and Israeli pharmacists dispense basic medications to patients.

From the very beginning, the Palestinian Medical Relief Society, the largest non-governmental primary healthcare provider in the West Bank, has been the main partner of PHR-I in these activities. Over the years, PHR-I has built partnerships with other local non-governmental, independent organizations. Through consistent collaborative work, the mobile clinic aims to serve as a gesture of trust and solidarity with Palestinian patients and medical professionals, help to foster greater recognition for human rights values among the Israeli medical community, while sensitizing the Israeli public and international community to the need for Israeli policy change vis-à-vis the occupied Palestinian territory.

== The Open Clinic ==
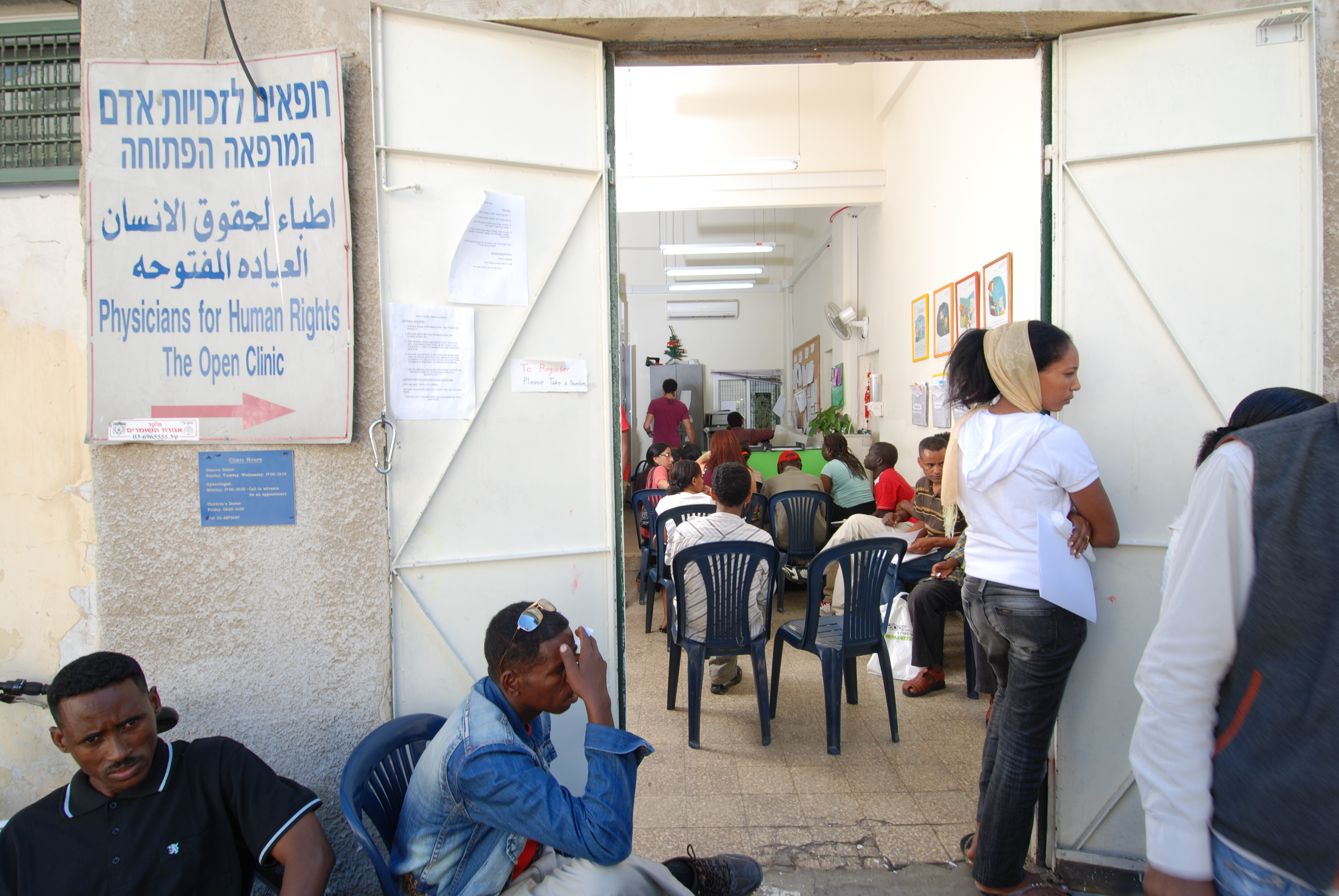
The Open Clinic

The Open Clinic is an established medical clinic located within PHR's headquarters in Jaffa. The clinic provides community healthcare to immigrants and persons lacking civil status living in Israel. The Open Clinic was founded in 1998 as an initiative of volunteer physicians, and due to the limitations in access to healthcare imposed on persons with no civil status. The clinic does not claim to solve all medical problems of the immigrant community, or to replace the Ministry of Health, but acts to point out the alleged faults in Israel's policy towards immigrants, and to show solidarity with the immigrant and refugee community. The Open Clinic provides primary medical care and specialized medicine, as well as hospital referrals and medical follow-up to persons with no civil status, free of charge or for a minimal fee. The clinic team, including reception staff as well as medical professionals, is made up solely of volunteers. While in the early years of the clinic most patients were migrant workers, today the patient population includes mostly refugees and asylum seekers. The clinic cares for over 6,000 patients annually.

== Position on Israeli anti-boycott law ==
PHR-I, in a statement, said that they strongly oppose the Israel boycott law and that they "will refuse to comply with it."

== Relationship with the Israel Medical Association ==
After PHR-I gave a first aid course to protesters of a security fence in the West Bank village Bil'in, Yoram Blachar the president of the World Medical Association (WMA) and the Israel Medical Association (IMA) told Haaretz that PHR-I "are a radical political group disguised as a medical organization."

The IMA severed ties with PHR-I after Ruchama Marton signed a petition to remove Blachar as president of the WMA. PHR-I and Marton stated that Marton was not expressing the views of PHR-I, but her own. In 2016, the IMA and PHR-I have also both petitioned the Supreme Court to strike down Israel’s force-feeding of prisoners law as in violation of international law, including the prohibition of torture. Following an appeal from PHR-I, the IMA adapted its ethical guide on the prioritization of medical care in multiple-casualty settings when the presumed attacker is also wounded. In 2019, the IMA joined PHR-I’s appeal against the removal of government-subsidized insurance options for undocumented migrant children as amicus.
