= Tamar Pelleg-Sryck =

Israeli attorney and human rights activist (1926–2024)

- תמר פלג שריק
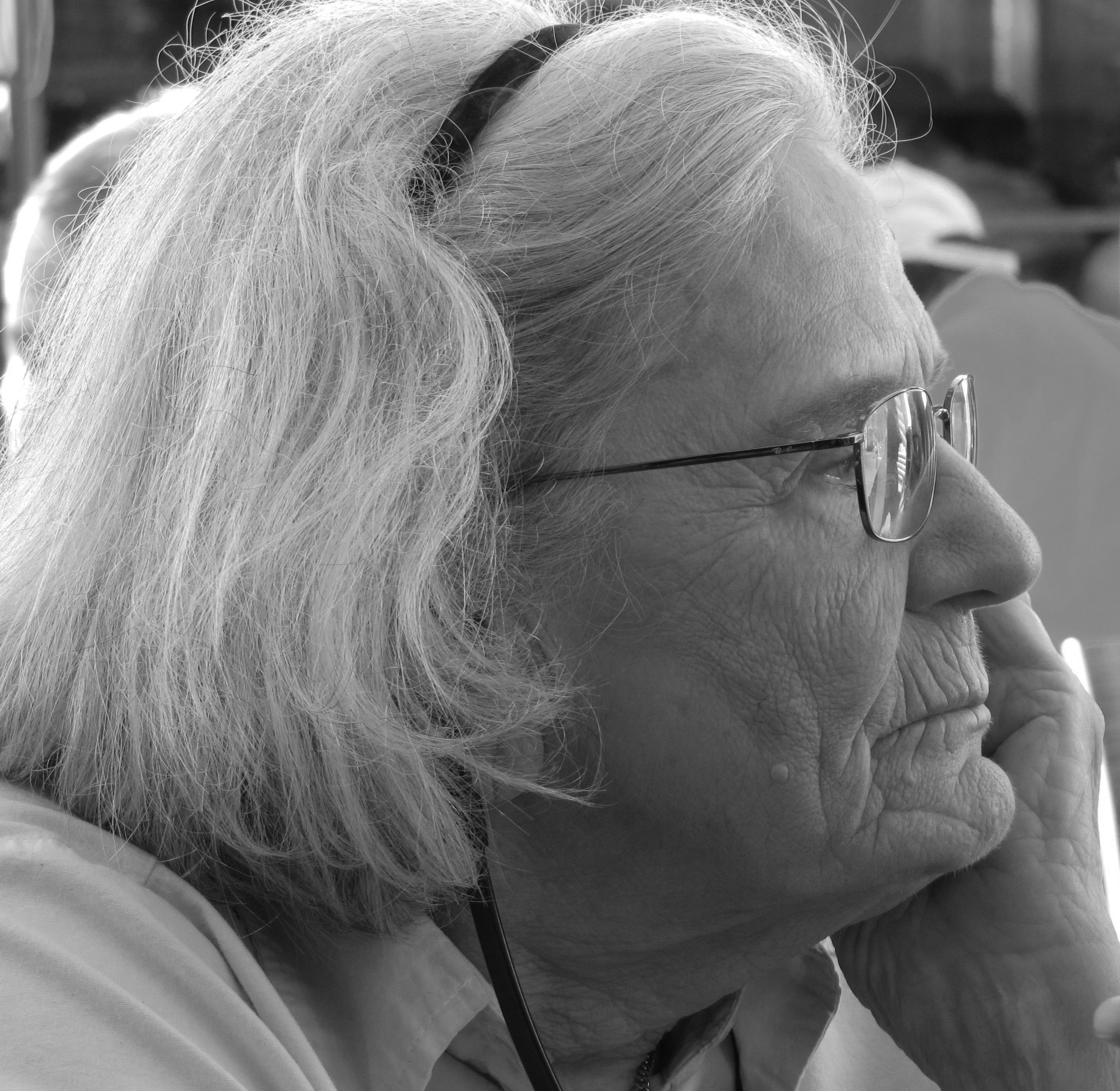
- Pelleg-Sryck in 2009
- Born: 2 June 1926; Pinsk, Poland
- Died: 11 March 2024 (aged 97)
- Occupations: Lawyer; Human rights activist
- Known for: Representing Palestinian detainees
- Awards: Emil Grunzweig Human Rights Award (2011)

Tamar Pelleg-Sryck (Hebrew: תמר פלג שריק; 2 June 1926 – 11 March 2024) was an Israeli lawyer and human rights activist. After working as a teacher and organizer, she qualified as a lawyer at 61 and was best known for representing Palestinian detainees in court and advocating for human rights in Palestine since the Intifada in December 1987.

Tamar Pelleg-Sryck died on 11 March 2024, at the age of 97.

== Award ==
- Emil Grunzweig Human Rights Award (2011) – lifetime achievement award
