= Palestinian Human Rights Monitoring Group =

Human rights organization in Jerusalem

- المجموعة الفلسطينية لمراقبة حقوق الإنسان
- Founded: 1996
- Dissolved: 2011
- Type: Non-profit
- Location(s): Beit Hanina; East Jerusalem
- Key people: Bassem Eid (Executive Director)

The Palestinian Human Rights Monitoring Group (PHRMG; Arabic: المجموعة الفلسطينية لمراقبة حقوق الإنسان) was a human rights group led by Bassem Eid, a former fieldworker for B'Tselem. It was active from 1996 to 2011 and largely focused on monitoring human rights violations by the Palestinian National Authority (PNA).

According to B'Tselem, PHRMG "monitors human rights violations by both Israel and the Palestinian National Authority." However, the Encyclopedia of the Israeli-Palestinian Conflict, edited by Cheryl Rubenberg, points out that despite the potential of PHRMG for that larger scope of reporting according to its official mandate, "in practice, the group has dedicated most of its work to monitoring human rights violations committed by the PNA." In April 2006, the group published its final regular bulletin on human rights, and it closed it doors officially in 2011 due to lack of funding.

PHRMG was founded by Eid when he quit B'Tselem over the organization's decision, as an Israeli NGO, to focus on Israeli human rights violations rather than those committed by Palestinian groups. In 1997, The Washington Post described PHRMG as "defying a taboo" among human rights organizations against criticizing violations of human rights by Palestinian governing authorities.
