= Israel National Council for the Child =

Israeli non-governmental organization

- המועצה הלאומית לשלום הילד المجلس الوطني الإسرائيلي للطفل
- Abbreviation: NCC
- Formation: 1980 (46 years ago)
- Type: Non-profit NGO
- Purpose: Children's rights advocacy
- Headquarters: 38 Pierre Koenig Street; Jerusalem, Israel
- Executive Director: Adv. Vered Windman
- Website: www.children.org.il?lang=en

The Israel National Council for the Child (Hebrew: המועצה הלאומית לשלום הילד, romanized: Ha-Moetzah ha-Lumit le-Shalom ha-Yeled, Arabic: المجلس الوطني الإسرائيلي للطفل, romanized: almjls alwtny alesra'eyly lltfl) in Jerusalem, Israel, is an Israeli independent non-profit non-governmental organization that advocates for children's rights and well-being. The organization serves all religions, ethnicities, and income levels in Israel.

The NCC was created in 1980 by the President of Israel. It is the oldest and largest children's rights advocacy organization in Israel.

== Activities ==
The NCC undertakes a number of activities in the interest of Israeli children. The NCC's ombudsmen, a position established in 1999 after a three-year test project, investigates thousands of potential violations annually.

== History ==
The NCC was created in 1980 by the President of Israel.

In February 1990, the NCC published a report that concluded that abused and neglected children in Israel faced a shortage of juvenile court judges and a case backlog, and suggested the creation of a country-wide children-protection authority.

Every year since 1992, the NCC has published "The State of the Child in Israel – A Statistical Abstract," which contains data on Israeli children.

In 1998, the NCC created the Child Victim Assistance Project, managed by an attorney, to provide child victims and their supporting families with information, and with support and advocacy services.

The NCC has sought for many years to terminate corporal punishment against children within Israel. According to Director Yitzchak Kadman, even slaps are "not ethical and not educational and [have] destructive results".

In December 2007, the NCC's Executive Director warned of "the potential damage to the mental health of a child exposed" to pedophiles online, and warned that maintaining child pornography on a computer is not only illegal but has the effect of providing support for an industry that causes harm to children.

In 2010, the NCC helped draft a Knesset bill providing state compensation to minors who suffer physical abuse or sexual abuse. In November 2011, NCC's Executive Director noted that as of the spring of 2011, due to a legislative amendment that the NCC had started, Israeli law forbids employing any person in Israel who has been convicted of child pornography issues.

In January 2012, the NCC reported that over 1,000 Israeli children and teens were considered missing, and said that the number could be decreased by improving information flow between the Israeli Ministry of Welfare and Social Services, the Ministry of Education, and the Israeli police. Most of the missing children (980) were over 12 years old; 14 were between 1–5; and 76 were ages 11–16.

In December 2013, the Israeli Knesset approved a bill co-drafted by the NCC, regulating foster care.

== Management ==
Dr. Yitzhak Kadman has served as Executive Director of the NCC from 1986 to 2016. Since 2016, Vered Windman, formerly the head of the NCC's legal department, serves as the Executive Director.
