= Oren Ziv =

Israeli journalist and photographer

- אורן זיו
- Born: 1985 (age 40–41); Israel
- Occupations: Journalist, Photographer and Videographer
- Years active: 2003 - present
- Employer(s): Local Call & +972 Magazine
- Organization: Activestills Collective (Co-founder)

Oren Ziv (Hebrew: אורן זיו; born in 1985) is an Israeli journalist, political commentator, and photographer. He reports for Local Call and +972 Magazine and is a freelance photographer for Haaretz, Agence-France Presse, and Getty Images. He has won several awards and been a jury member at the 5th International Activist Award, issued by the PhotoPhilanthropy in 2014, for his work documenting social and political issues in Israel and Palestine since 2003. In 2024, he was awarded the Emil Grunzweig Human Rights Award for his outstanding contribution to the advancement of human rights in Israel.

Ziv is the co-founder of The Activestills Collective, a photojournalism collection known for shaping the visual language of Local Call over the years. He joined Local Call as a staff reporter in 2018, covering human and civil rights issues in a broad spectrum, including themes such as the occupation, affordable housing, socio-economic struggles, and protests against discrimination. Ziv's work has been published in the New York Times "Lens" Blog, Al Jazeera, Vice, Tablet, and other reputable platforms.

Israeli settlers in occupied Hebron in Palestine's West Bank attacked Ziv, Breaking the Silence activist Yehuda Shaul and Irish writer Colm Toibin in 2016.

== Education ==
Ziv has a Master of Arts degree in Research/Forensic Architecture from Goldsmiths University in London.

== Awards ==
He received the Curators' Choice Prize during the "Israeli Local Testimony" exhibition at the Eretz Israel Museum from 2011 to 2014.

== Works ==
- Video image credit on the "Israeli Cabinet Members Join Settler Event of Thousands Calling for Ethnic Cleansing of Gaza" story reported by Amy Goodman, Democracy Now, Jan 31st 2024
- "Young Israelis refuse to join the Israeli army in protest of the occupation", Islam Channel, November 2023
- "Seder Held at Migrant Detention Center in Israel", Tablet, April 2014

== Appearances as commentator ==
- "Israeli Cabinet Members Join Settler Event of Thousands Calling for Ethnic Cleansing of Gaza", Democracy Now, January 2024
- "The fear is everywhere: Israel's Fascist Internal Crackdown", Marc Steiner Show, November 2023
- "Activestills: Photography as Protest in Palestine/Israel", Center for the Humanities, March 2017
