= 2021 ban of Palestinian human rights organizations =

On 19 October 2021, Israel designated six Palestinian human rights organizations—Addameer, Al-Haq, Bisan Center for Research and Development, Defense for Children International-Palestine, the Union of Agricultural Work Committees, and the Union of Palestinian Women's Committees—as terrorist organizations. After the ban, an Israeli official told American media that arrests of the organizations' leadership was not being pursued, the goal was to cut off funding for the targeted groups. Although the ban was justified on the basis that the organizations had links to the Popular Front for the Liberation of Palestine, no evidence for such links has been made public by Israel.

The ban was widely criticised by human rights organisations. Multiple European states rebuffed the idea the NGOs were 'terrorist organizations' while the CIA determined that the accusations were unsupported by evidence. Some European countries said they would continue to fund the organisations from the list, while one such organisation has had their funding cut by the Netherlands.

== Background ==
Since 1967, more than 400 organizations in the Palestinian territories have been banned by Israel, including all major Palestinian political parties and several media and charity groups. The six targeted organizations had been operating for decades in the Israeli-occupied Palestinian territories as part of the Palestinian NGOs Network. All of them received funding from Western governments and documented allegations of human rights violations, war crimes and apartheid by Israel. This documentation was a major factor in the opening of the International Criminal Court investigation in Palestine. Al-Haq faced longstanding allegations by Israel of a connection to the Popular Front for the Liberation of Palestine; its executive director, Shawan Jabarin, spent eight years imprisoned without charge.

After May 2021, some of the organizations' offices were raided, possibly to obtain evidence for the designation. On 16 October 2021, Al-Haq contacted Front Line Defenders after it suspected it had been hacked. Hacking experts later confirmed that six devices had been targeted by Pegasus, the first time that NSO Group spyware had been used against Palestinians. Among those targeted were the Bisan Center's leader Ubai al-Aboudi, a United States citizen, and Adameer researcher Salah Hamouri, who is a citizen of France.

The ban of the organizations is based on the 2016 Israeli counter-terrorism law. Legal scholars Eliav Lieblich and Adam Shinar describe the law as "flawed beyond repair". Organizations only learn that they have been designated terrorist after the fact and have limited opportunity to appeal—to the minister of defense, who is authorized to issue the declaration in the first place. Although it is possible to appeal in the courts, a court is virtually guaranteed to rule against the organization because of the use of secret evidence that the defense is not allowed to see. One Western diplomat explained the reaction to the terrorism designation by explaining that terrorism laws in European countries are narrower.

In 2024 it was reported that Al-Haq, Addameer, Al Mezan, and the Palestinian Center for Human Rights (PCHR) had been targeted for a surveillance operation as part of a broader strategy, involving the IDF, Mossad, Shin Bet and other Israeli institutions, which sought to derail investigations by the international Court of Justice and the International Criminal Court into human rights abuses committed against Palestinians. All four were considered as bodies damaging Israel's standing in the international world.

== Designation ==
Israel claims that the groups are connected to the PFLP and that more than half of the funding for the groups is being funneled to the PFLP. The groups deny any link to the PFLP. As of April 2022, Israel has not publicly released any evidence of such a link. After the ban, an Israeli official told American media that arrests of the organizations' leadership was not being pursued, the goal was to cut off funding for the targeted groups.

+972 Magazine, Local Call, and The Intercept obtained a copy of a 74-page dossier on the organization sent to European governments in May in an effort to defund the organizations; NPR, the Associated Press and other media publishers also analyzed the dossier. According to the dossier, Switzerland, Germany, the Netherlands, the United Kingdom, Belgium, Sweden, Spain, and the European Union provide funding to the six organizations. Most of the dossier focuses on interrogations of two former employees of a seventh NGO, the Health Work Committees, fired on suspicion of financial wrongdoing. The employees asserted that it was generally known that the six organizations had ties to the PFLP, but did not provide any evidence. One man's lawyer said that his client's testimony could have been provided under torture or ill-treatment. According to +972 Magazine, "contrary to the Israeli Defense Ministry’s claims, the dossier did not provide a single piece of evidence proving the six organizations diverted their funds to the PFLP or to violent activities." Israeli officials said that they had more evidence. After the ban, some speculated that it was based on information provided by NGO Monitor, which The Intercept describes as "a hyperpartisan Zionist group".

Shortly after the ban, Shin Bet officials traveled to Washington to discuss the ban with the United States government. They gave Associated Press a summary of their presentation, which was similar to the dossier obtained by +972 Magazine. At the time, United States State Department spokesperson Ned Price declined to comment. The Dutch foreign minister and the Belgian economic development minister stated that the dossier did not have "even a single concrete piece of evidence". Belgium and Sweden said that they independently audited their funding of the organizations, and found no evidence of wrongdoing. Israeli human rights lawyer Michael Sfard said that after the dossier failed to persuade, "since the Europeans didn’t buy the allegations, [the Israeli authorities] used unconventional warfare: declaring the organizations terrorist groups".

According to Haaretz, the organizations remained legal in the West Bank after the ban.

== Reactions ==
The ban was subject to widespread criticism. Within the Israeli coalition government, health minister Nitzan Horowitz (of Meretz) criticized the announcement, and the transport minister Merav Michaeli (of the Israeli Labor Party) said that the announcement "caused Israel great damage with our greatest and most important friends". Michelle Bachelet, the United Nations High Commissioner for Human Rights, called the ban "an attack on human rights defenders", and said it should be revoked. The United Nations Human Rights Office in the Palestinian territories stated that it was "the latest development in a long, stigmatising campaign against these and other organisations, damaging their ability to deliver on their crucial work". Several UN human rights experts condemned the designation, calling it "a frontal attack on the Palestinian human rights movement, and on human rights everywhere" and "manifestly egregious misuse of counterterrorism and security legislation". According to an article in openDemocracy, "the Israeli minister’s recent decision could be read as an attempt to silence Palestinian organizations and prevent them from providing" evidence to the ICC's Palestine investigation.

242 human rights organizations signed a joint letter condemning the ban; Several dozen major foundations and philanthropists also condemned the ban and said it would not affect their funding. Said Benarbia of the International Commission of Jurists said that "Israeli authorities are, once again, joining a long list of repressive States that use measures purportedly designed to counter terrorism as a pretext to crack down on legitimate human rights work". The American Bar Association does not take a position on the charges, but expressed concern that the organizations in question lacked a procedural opportunity to challenge the designation. Amnesty International and Human Rights Watch called it "an attack by the Israeli government on the international human rights movement". Israeli human rights organization B'Tselem called it "an act characteristic of totalitarian regimes, with the clear purpose of shutting down these organisations”.

Sahar Francis, the director of Adameer, said that "Israel has no authority to apply this law to the occupied West Bank" and had avoided the use of military law because it would be seen as less legitimate internationally. Lieblich and Shinar highlight the conflict of interest in the declaration, given that the organizations expose human rights violations of an occupying power. They add: "it simply cannot be accepted that well-known and widely respected Palestinian human rights groups be designated as “terrorist organizations” by executive fiat and on the basis of classified intelligence. The reasons are too murky, the interests too conflicting, and the stakes are far too high for this extreme action to pass as tolerable."

The targeted organizations appealed to the United States, European Union, and the international community to oppose Israel's action. Irish foreign minister Simon Coveney stated that he had "not gotten any credible evidence linking the NGOs to terrorism". Six months later, the Biden administration said it was still considering the evidence presented to it by the Israeli government, although eleven members of the House of Representatives cosponsored a resolution to condemn the ban. Itay Epshtain, an adviser to the Norwegian Refugee Council, said that the organizations' funding is regularly audited and no evidence of fraud has been discovered. He said that there is "no question" that "These six organizations are bonafide human rights organizations that do valuable, credible, reputable work." British and American celebrities, including Mark Ruffalo, Peter Gabriel and Philip Pullman, also signed a statement condemning the ban. According to Middle East analyst Khaled Elgindy, the ban of the groups is part of Israel's strategy to delegitimize non-violent Palestinian resistance.

Ireland and Denmark rejected the charges against the six organizations and said they would continue funding. Norwegian foreign minister Anniken Huitfeldt said in October that she was concerned that the designation would shrink the civil society space in Palestine.

The government of the Netherlands cut ties with one of the organisations on the list, Union of Agricultural Work Committees (UAWC), in January 2022. A review found no evidence that the UAWC transferring money to PFLP; however, it did find personal ties and overlapping membership between the two organisations.

In May 2022, Dutch foreign minister Wopke Hoekstra met with Al-Haq in Ramallah. Hoekstra said he had not seen any evidence that Al-Haq had links with terrorism, adding that no European country or even the United States had come to the same conclusion as Israel. He invited Israel to provide evidence that the organizations were terrorist, but said that according to the rule of law accusation had to be substantiated by evidence.

The European Anti-Fraud Office was informed of the charges but has not opened an investigation. European diplomats interviewed by Haaretz stated that the evidence provided by Israel did not prove the allegations.

Citing the case, Diana Buttu says that "it does not take much for donors to run scared: just using the “t” word is sufficient, with no need for evidence". Any Palestinian can be imprisoned indefinitely based on secret evidence; upon their release, their involvement with any organization could be cited as evidence of a terrorist connection. Because of the high rate of imprisonment of Palestinians, practically any Palestinian organization could be deemed to be terrorist-affiliated.
