= Timeline of the Israeli–Palestinian conflict in 2022 =

- Timeline of the Israeli–Palestinian conflict
- 2021; 2022; 2023

The following is a list of events during the Israeli–Palestinian conflict in 2022.

== January ==
=== 1 January ===
At least two rockets were fired towards Tel Aviv from the Gaza Strip. The rockets exploded in the sea. No injuries or damage were reported. Military groups in Gaza said the incident was accidental and that it was “caused by weather conditions".

=== 3 January ===
Shots were fired by Palestinian gunmen from Gaza towards southern Israeli communities. Tensions heightened along the border as it was the third attack from Gaza that week, although no injuries or damage were reported.

=== 6 January ===
A 21-year-old Palestinian was killed by Israeli forces following an army raid on Balata refugee camp near Nablus in the West Bank.

A 25-year-old Palestinian was hit and killed by a settler vehicle at the Beit Sira checkpoint. The driver reportedly turned himself in to authorities.

=== 12 January ===
In Jilijliya, an 80-year-old Palestinian-American man died after being detained by Israeli forces. U.S. State Department spokesman Ned Price said U.S. officials had requested “clarification” of events from Israel, saying “We support a thorough investigation into the circumstances.” The Israeli authorities announced an investigation.

On 9 October, Israel's defense ministry said it will pay the family of the deceased 500,000 shekels (US$141,000) On 16 October, the family of the deceased said they rejected compensation offered in return for dismissing a lawsuit they had submitted before US and Israeli courts.

=== 13 January ===
Israeli officers Maj. Ofek Aharon and Maj. Itamar Elharar, were accidentally killed by another soldier near the Nabi Musa base. They had been mistaken for attackers after they fired into the air at a suspected assailant.

=== 17 January ===
A Palestinian man was shot and killed after he attempted to stab Israeli soldiers near the Gush Etzion Junction.

A 65-year-old Palestinian activist from Umm al-Khair, Hebron, who was run over by a tow truck on 5 January, died of his injuries. The tow truck and its police escort both left the scene.

=== 23 January ===
Palestinian Islamic Jihad held a demonstration in Gaza where dozens of protesters chanted “Death to the House of Saud” and waved posters of the leader of Yemen's Houthi militia. Hamas condemned the demonstrations.

=== 24 January ===
Near Qalandiya refugee camp, after a clash between Israeli forces and Palestinians, a 57-year-old patient at an UNRWA health facility, inhaled teargas and later died. On 26 January, UNRWA called for an investigation, saying that staff had appealed for a ceasefire to allow patients to exit safely.

== February ==
=== 2 February ===
Attempted drive-by shooting attack towards an IDF post near Nablus was reported. No soldiers were injured in the attack.

=== 3 February ===
Israeli Border Police troops came under heavy gunfire and IEDs during dawn arrests in the West Bank town of Tubas.

=== 8 February ===
In Nablus city, undercover Israeli forces killed three Palestinians. Subsequently, sources described the killings as an assassination or extrajudicial killing. According to Israeli authorities cited by Israeli media the men were members of an armed Palestinian group that had carried out attacks on Israeli forces.

=== 14 February ===
A 17-year-old Palestinian was killed in Silat al-Harithiya, during a punitive demolition by Israel where the IDF said soldiers were attacked with rocks and Molotov cocktails and they responded with live fire.

=== 15 February ===
A 19-year-old Palestinian man was killed by Israeli forces at Nabi Salih. According to security forces, “dozens of Palestinians” had approached an army post and threw stones, who responded by using riot control techniques including live fire. Palestinian witnesses disputed the IDF account of events. According to a medical source, the man was shot in the lower back from a very short distance. No Israeli injuries were reported.

=== 22 February ===
Israeli forces shot and killed a 13-year-old Palestinian near al-Khader. Israeli forces said the boy was throwing a Molotov cocktail at passing vehicles.

== March ==
=== 1 March ===
A 19-year-old Palestinian was killed near Beit Fajjar; He and an associate fled when approached by Israeli forces who said they carried out an “arrest procedure, which included shooting at the suspects,” and that the incident is being investigated.

Two Palestinians, 18 and 22, were killed in clashes after Israeli forces entered Jenin refugee camp to arrest a suspect “wanted for terrorist activity”.

=== 2 March ===
A 23-year-old Palestinian man was critically wounded on 2 March when Israeli forces shot him near Burqa and died from his wounds on March 9.

=== 4 March ===
Australia designates Hamas in its entirety to be a terrorist organization, in contrast to the previous stance that only recognized the group's military wing, the Izz ad-Din al-Qassam Brigades as such.

=== 6 March ===
A 15-year-old Palestinian was shot in Abu Dis, after Israeli forces said that he threw a Molotov cocktail at them; he died later in hospital.

=== 7 March ===
Two Israeli border police soldiers were stabbed and moderately injured at the entrance to Temple Mount in the Old City of Jerusalem. The Ramallah-born attacker was shot dead. According to the Times of Israel "Footage from the scene showed the two officers standing over the assailant, who appears to be lying on the ground shortly after the attack. One of the officers then opened fire before standing on top of the alleged attacker while shouting expletives."

=== 15 March ===
A 16-year-old Palestinian was shot and killed after Israeli forces entered Balata refugee camp to make an arrest. According to Israeli forces, "a "terrorist" also arrived on a motorbike and shot at the troops, who returned fire and "neutralised" him,"".

A Palestinian man in his 20s was shot dead by Israeli forces in the Qalandiyah refugee camp. Israeli forces said they came under attack after they arrested two people.

=== 29 March ===
A 26-year-old Palestinian man killed 5 people in a mass shooting in the streets of Bnei Brak. The attacker was killed by the police, and an Arab Israeli officer later died of wounds sustained during the gunfight. The al-Aqsa Martyrs' Brigades claimed responsibility for the attack.

=== 31 March ===
A Palestinian militant stabbed an Israeli bus passenger near the Neve Daniel settlement with a screwdriver before being shot dead by another passenger.

== April ==
=== 7 April ===
Palestinian Raad Hazem killed three Israelis in a mass shooting in Dizengoff Street, Tel Aviv. Hazem was killed the following day.

=== 9 April ===
An 18-year-old Palestinian man was shot and wounded by Israeli forces on 9 April during a search-and-arrest operation in Al-Yamun, and died as a result on 22 April.

A 17-year-old Palestinian, wounded in the same operation, succumbed to his wounds two days later.

An 18-year-old female Palestinian student, Hanan Khadour, was shot critically when she entered a taxi in Jenin to go home. The incident occurred during an Israeli operation in the area and she died of her wound several days later on 18 April. Israel said it would investigate but as of 11 May has issued no statement regarding the cause of her death.

=== 10 April ===
A 47-year-old unarmed Palestinian woman was shot at a makeshift checkpoint near Bethlehem after Israeli forces said she had approached the soldiers “in a suspicious manner,” failing to heed verbal commands and warning shots.The woman died of blood loss from a severed artery in her thigh after being taken to Beit Jala hospital. OCHA reported that according to eyewitnesses, soldiers prevented medical teams from reaching the woman for about half an hour. George Noll, head of the Palestinian Affairs Unit at the US Embassy, made a call to the family although she was not an American citizen but had American relatives.

=== 12 April ===
A Palestinian from Hebron was shot dead after stabbing and lightly wounding a policeman at construction site in Ashkelon. The injured officer said he encountered the man during a check for Palestinians in Israel illegally. According to OCHA, Palestinian eyewitnesses said he was asleep and did not resist.

=== 13 April ===
A Palestinian man was killed by Israeli forces in his car taking his nephews to school when hit by a stray bullet fired from an ongoing clash between Israeli forces and Palestinians at Joseph's Tomb in Nablus.

A 34-year-old Palestinian was shot by Israeli forces "during the aggression on the city of Nablus,” according to the Palestinian health ministry. Israeli forces said troops were “conducting counterterrorist operations” in Nablus and other West Bank cities. Five consecutive days of Israeli raids in the West Bank followed a series of attacks within Israel.

A 14-year-old Palestinian who allegedly threw a petrol bomb at soldiers conducting a sweep in the area was also killed.

=== 14 April ===
A 14-year-old boy was killed by Israeli forces at the entrance to Husan where Palestinians threw stones at Israeli forces positioned at the entrance of the village, and Israeli forces fired live ammunition, rubber-coated metal bullets and tear gas canisters. The IDF said soldiers used live ammunition according to the open fire regulations. (Note: In November 2021, the open-fire regulations were changed to permit Israeli forces to fire on "suspects who hurl Molotov cocktails or rocks, even after the deadly object is no longer in their hands.") An eyewitness told CNN said that soldiers were shooting at someone else preparing firebombs and that the victim had been seeking shelter.

=== 15 April ===
Israeli forces raided the Haram Al Sharif/Temple Mount and arrested 470 Palestinians, including 60 children. The Israeli Police Commissioner said Palestinians "attacked a police station and threatened the safety of Jewish worshipers at the Western Wall". 180 Palestinians, including 27 children and four women, were injured from stun grenades, sponge-tipped bullets and baton strikes, "including children, women, journalists and others who were demonstrably not involved in any stone-throwing" while 3 members of Israeli forces were injured by stones.

=== 17 April ===
After further altercations at the Al-Aqsa mosque, Ra'am announced it would temporarily halt its coalition membership in the Government of Israel in protest against the situation at al-Aqsa. According to the U.S State department, US Secretary of State Antony Blinken and Jordanian Foreign Minister Ayman Safadi discussed the situation on 18 April and “Secretary Blinken emphasized the importance of upholding the historic status quo at the Haram Al-Sharif/Temple Mount, and appreciation for the Hashemite Kingdom of Jordan's special role as custodian of Muslim holy places in Jerusalem,” Jordan's King Abdullah, speaking with UN Secretary-General Antonio Guterres, said that “provocative acts” by Israel violated “the legal and historic status quo” of the Muslim holy shrines.

=== 19 April ===
A rocket is fired from the Gaza Strip into Israel, which the Iron Dome intercepts. Israel launches an attack on a weapon depot in Gaza in response.

=== 22 April ===
Israeli police in full riot gear stormed the mosque after Palestinian stone throwing at a gate where they were stationed. A 21-year-old Palestinian man was injured and succumbed to his wounds on May 14. Palestinian sources said he was severely wounded by a sponge-tipped bullet while the police said he had fallen and sustained a head injury.

=== 23 April ===
Israel closed Erez Crossing in retaliation for three rockets fired from Gaza.

=== 26 April ===
A 20-year-old Palestinian was killed during a raid on the Aqabat Jabr refugee camp in Jericho, in the eastern West Bank.

=== 27 April ===
An 18-year-old Palestinian was shot and killed during a raid on the Jenin area. According to Al-Jazeera', as of 27 April, at least 47 Palestinians have been killed since the start of 2022, inclusive of 11 in the previous two weeks (including 6 from Jenin) since Israel intensified activity across the West Bank following four attacks in Israel that killed 14 people, including three police officers.

=== 29 April ===
There were new clashes at Al-Aqsa mosque on the last Friday of Ramadan. 42 Palestinians were wounded.

A 23-year-old Israeli security guard was killed in a drive-by-shooting at the Israeli settlement of Ariel by two Palestinian assailants. Both al-Aqsa Martyrs' Brigades (Fatah) and Hamas (al-Qassam Brigades) claimed responsibility for the terror attack.

=== 30 April ===
A 27-year-old Palestinian was shot dead near Azzun by Israeli forces. An army spokesperson told AFP the operation was linked to the hunt for the Ariel attackers.

== May ==
=== 4 May ===
A two-decade-old legal battle culminated with an Israeli Supreme Court ruling that deemed eight small Palestinian villages in Masafer Yatta were illegally located in Firing Zone 918 by non-permanently residing residents who used the land for seasonal purposes such as farming and grazing, thus paving way for the eviction of approximately 1,000 Palestinians from the land. Israeli international human rights lawyer Michael Sfard said the judges rejected the claim that the “prohibition of forcible transfer set forth in international law is customary and binding,” calling it instead a “treaty norm” that is not enforceable in a domestic court. Human rights groups, the UN, and several nations expressed concern and/or condemned the decision

=== 5 May ===
On Yom Ha'atzmaut (Independence Day), three Israelis were killed by two Palestinian assailants from Rummanah in an axe murder terror attack at a park in El'ad. Israeli security forces launched a manhunt to apprehend the suspects, who fled by car. They were captured 3 days later in a wooded area near El'ad. A fourth victim, a 75-year-old man, succumbed to his wounds in February 2023, eight months after the attack.

=== 8 May ===
At least one police officer was moderately injured in a stabbing near Damascus Gate. The attack took place immediately after officers had stopped him outside of after he had aroused their suspicion. The attacker, a 19-year-old Palestinian man from Ramallah, was shot and subdued.

A Palestinian man was shot and killed by Israeli forces who said that soldiers “spotted a suspect who attempted to illegally cross the security fence” near the northern West Bank city of Tulkarem and fired at him "in accordance with the rules of engagement". The Gaza Strip resident had entered Israel in 2019 and never returned.

A 17-year-old Palestinian boy armed with a knife was shot dead after infiltrating the West Bank settlement of Tekoa in Gush Etzion. He was spotted by a resident of the settlement, who was also a civilian member of its security team, after he had vaulted the security fence and approached the settler's home. He was shot point blank with an M16 rifle after a brief confrontation. The intruder was from Harmala, a village adjacent to the settlement. Although he was a Hamas member, the attack was not ordered by the group.

=== 9 May ===
The Palestinian Ministry of Health published the names of the 50 Palestinians killed during 2022, 49 from the West Bank and one from the Gaza Strip.

=== 10 May ===
Israeli authorities demolished a three-storey building in Silwan stating that the owners had no permits. 35 people, mostly children were left homeless. Israel frequently carries out such demolitions for this reason but, according to an UN study, permits are "virtually impossible" to obtain. Nearly 40 structures have been demolished in east Jerusalem in 2022, displacing about 100 people, according to the United Nations Office for the Coordination of Human Affairs.

=== 11 May ===
Shireen Abu Akleh, a veteran reporter for Al Jazeera was shot and killed during clashes between Israeli forces and Palestinians in Jenin. Al Jazeera accused Israel of deliberately targeting the victim. Israel denied responsibility and suggested that Palestinian gunfire was responsible. The United States Ambassador to Israel, Tom Nides called for a full investigation.

An 18-year-old Palestinian man was killed near Ramallah by Israeli forces, who said they responded to stone throwing with rubber-coated bullets. Palestinian security sources said the soldiers used live fire.

=== 12 May ===
Israel gave final approval for 2,791 housing units in illegal settlements, advanced plans for 1,636 and retroactively authorized two Israeli outposts. The move, previously condemned by the US, was also condemned by the UN and by the EU.

=== 13 May ===
48-year-old Israeli police commando Noam Raz was shot and killed by Palestinian militants in Jenin during a raid. The Palestinian Ministry of Health said 13 Palestinians were injured, two critically, during the Israeli raid. Two days later (May 15), a 41-year-old Palestinian militant died from the wounds he sustained.

=== 15 May ===
A 43-year-old Israeli man was attacked by Palestinians in the neighborhood of Isawiya, East Jerusalem.

=== 16 May ===
In the early morning hours, a 22-year-old Palestinian from Al-Bireh wielding an axe and carrying a suicide note stating that he was intending an attack in the West Bank was arrested by Israeli police.

The funeral of Walid al-Sharif, who was struck by a rubber bullet fired by Israeli forces near al-Aqsa mosque compound on April 22 and died from his injuries on May 14, was accompanied by violence in Jerusalem. Police said there were "violent disturbances" in the graveyard and their officers were attacked. The deceased's brother received a fractured skull from a rubber-coated bullet during the funeral and the family accused police of using excessive force.

=== 20 May ===
Demolitions and evictions were initiated for eight Palestinian villages in Masafer Yatta following the May 4th Israeli Supreme Court ruling.

=== 21 May ===
A 17-year-old Palestinian member of the Palestinian Islamic Jihad was shot and killed in Kafr Dan near Jenin when he engaged in fighting with Israeli forces during a raid. Another 18-year-old Palestinian was critically wounded from the same confrontation.

=== 22 May ===
European Parliament member Manu Pineda, chair of the Parliament's Delegation for relations with Palestine, announced on Twitter that Israel had denied entry to him and his group of European lawmakers. European Parliament President Roberta Metsola responded saying that she regretted the decision and would raise the issue with relevant authorities.

=== 25 May ===
A 16-year-old Palestinian was shot and killed by Israeli forces in clashes near Joseph's Tomb, Nablus. 88 Palestinians were injured.

=== 27 May ===
A 15-year-old Palestinian was shot and killed by Israeli forces that used live fire in response to throwing of stones and petrol bombs at al-Khader near Bethlehem. The European Union Delegation to the Palestinians said that in May 2022 "five Palestinian children died as a result of the continued disproportionate use of lethal force by Israeli forces, bringing the total number in 2022 to 13." According to the human rights group B'Tselem, Israeli forces open fire policy, "allowing the use of live ammunition to respond to even minor security incidents such as isolated rock throwing" has resulted in several deaths, including two Palestinian teenagers in February of this year.

=== 29 May ===
The annual Jerusalem Day and Dance of Flags march produced violence as well as anti-Palestinian racism before ending in what was described as "a relatively calm manner." 81 Palestinians were wounded and the Israeli police said 5 of its members were lightly wounded.

== June ==
=== 1 June ===
A 31-year-old Palestinian woman was shot and killed by Israeli forces who said that the woman approached a soldier with a knife at Arroub refugee camp. Palestinian eyewitnesses said there was no attack and video footage showed no weapon in her possession.

A 24-year-old Palestinian was shot and killed by Israeli forces in Ya'abad, southwest of Jenin around which Israel conducts near-daily raids. Israeli forces including 30 military vehicles and bulldozers arrived to demolish the residence of Diaa Hamarsheh, who killed five people in Bnei Brak in March, leading to firefights with the military in which conflicting accounts say others received bullet wounds and are in critical condition. According to a statement by the military "hundreds of rioters threw stones, set fire to tires and threw Molotov cocktails and explosives at the forces." A 37-year-old Palestinian shot by Israeli forces later died of his wounds.

=== 2 June ===
According to the Palestinian Ministry of Health, a 29-year-old Palestinian was killed during a raid by Israeli forces at the Dheisheh refugee camp near Bethlehem.

A 17-year-old Palestinian boy was shot and killed by Israeli forces near al-Midya, west of Ramallah, according to the Palestine Ministry of Health.

=== 3 June ===
Following a preliminary vote in the Israeli Knesset to ban the display of enemy flags at state-funded institutions, including that of Palestine, an Israeli NGO, in response, paid to erect enormous Palestinian and Israeli flags at the Israel Diamond Exchange building. Recent notable news stories demonstrate the potential for tension around Palestinian flags. Israeli police assaulted pallbearers carrying the coffin, draped in a Palestinian flag, of the Al Jazeera journalist Shireen Abu Aqla, shot dead while covering an Israeli army raid in Jenin refugee camp on 11 May. At her funeral, Israeli officers took Palestinian flags from mourners and smashed the window of the hearse to remove a Palestinian flag. Israeli soldiers have been filmed removing Palestinian flags and protecting Jewish settlers doing the same in Huwara which is under PA administration. Palestinians cheered a drone flying a Palestinian flag over Damascus Gate in response to Israeli flag waving during a nationalist Jerusalem day flag march.

=== 6 June ===
A Knesset vote to extend the emergency authorization that applies Israeli law to settlers in the West Bank for an additional five years from June 30, 2022, failed to pass, adding to uncertainty about how long the ruling coalition can survive.

=== 7 June ===
The Heads of Mission of the European Union and likeminded countries visited the Wadi Qadoom area of Silwan and Deputy European Union Representative Maria Velasco reaffirmed "The continued practice of demolitions and evictions in occupied East Jerusalem is in violation of international humanitarian law and must cease," In 2022, 75 demolitions have been carried out in East Jerusalem alone on the basis of lacking a building permit, virtually impossible to obtain.

=== 9 June ===
A 27 year-old Palestinian was shot and killed by Israeli forces that had raided Halhul three hours earlier. Israeli forces routinely carry out such raids that often lead to the killing or injury of Palestinians. In 2022, Israeli forces have killed at least 62 Palestinians in the West Bank, according to the Ministry of Health. According to Israel Army Radio, the incident occurred when rioters threw stones and Molotov cocktails at the Israeli soldiers.

According to Axios, citing current and former U.S and Israeli officials, the Biden administration has in recent months raised the possibility of a White House meeting between senior Israeli and Palestinian officials with Israel expressing reservations. Israeli officials said that in a meeting last week with Israel's national security adviser Eyal Hulata, Deputy Secretary of State Wendy Sherman suggested a five-way summit between Israel, the PA, the U.S., Egypt and Jordan. According to the Israeli officials, the proposal was rejected and they said they did not understand why the matter was being pressed when the chance for a successful outcome was low. The State Department said, "We have nothing to announce.

=== 14 June ===
During a meeting with Palestinian Prime Minister Mohammad Shtayye in Ramallah, EU commissioner Ursula von der Leyen said that the transfer of frozen economic aid for 2021 had been approved and that an annual €600 million would "be disbursed rapidly,". The EU did not condition the aid to any change in Palestinian school textbooks, walking back from a previous decision to delay aid until the removal of alleged incitement from the books. Twenty-six EU countries backed a proposal to remove conditionality with Hungary the sole dissenter. Hungarian Commissioner Oliver Várhelyi blocked the funding in 2021, arguing for changes in content of the textbooks, which some pro-Israeli groups said contained anti-Semitic content.

=== 17 June ===
Three Palestinian militants were killed by Israeli forces in Jenin, after they opened fire at Israeli forces. Two Palestinians who carried out recent attacks came from Jenin, and Israel has been carrying out nearly daily raids following the killings by Palestinians of seventeen Israelis and two Ukrainians. According to the Palestinian health ministry, more than 60 Palestinians have been killed by Israeli forces this year.

=== 18 June ===
Palestinian militants fired a rocket from Gaza at Ashkelon in the early hours. The rocket was intercepted, and the IDF later responded with airstrikes. The launch broke a two month long lull between Gaza and Israel.

=== 19 June ===
Israeli forces said they killed a Palestinian man who was attempting to damage the Israeli West Bank barrier near Qalqilya. The Israeli military said "The suspect damaged the security fence… in an attempt to cross into Israeli territory. The soldiers opened fire. A hit was identified," The Israeli army declined to say whether the victim was armed. The victim was a 53 year-old resident of Nablus. The Palestinian Foreign Ministry called the killing a "field execution". Every week thousands of Palestinians illegally cross the fence to avoid checkpoints.

=== 21 June ===
According to WAFA, the ministry of health said in a statement that a 27 year-old Palestinian was stabbed to death in Iskaka by an Israeli settler. According to the Jerusalem Post, the Israeli police said they are investigating a fight between Palestinians and Israelis near Ariel and that the identity of the attacker is unclear. Al Jazeera cited Yesh Din who said in a statement that the stabbing occurred on private Palestinian property "Settlers arrived at the scene and attempted to set up a tent. Friction ensued and settlers left the place. Immediately afterward, soldiers arrived at the scene, and later the settlers returned," and a fight ensued, “during which a settler pulled out a knife and stabbed the young man to death" According to The Times of Israel Shin Bet has joined police to investigate the stabbing and obtained a gag order on the details of the investigation, including the names of the suspects. Eyewitness Naim Harb, the victim's uncle, told The New Arab that he and two family members were arrested on 27 June and he was interrogated about his statement given to police at the time saying that Israeli soldiers were present at the time of the stabbing, a position he maintained under interrogation.

In August, Israel's State Prosecutor released a statement saying, "after reviewing evidence in the case, including statements from those involved in the incident … the decision was made to close the case since the claim of self-defence could not be ruled out". According to Yesh Din, since 2005, 92 percent of cases of settler violence were closed without an indictment and only three percent of cases have led to convictions in the same period.

=== 25 June ===
A 16-year-old Palestinian was shot on June 24 near Silwad by Israeli forces and later died from his wounds while in custody. Israeli forces told AFP that dozens of Palestinians had gathered near Silwad and that "a number of suspects hurled rocks" at passing cars, "endangering civilians." and live fire was used as a last resort. ABC news via AP, said that "..soldiers opened fire at stone-throwing Palestinians, according to Israeli and Palestinian officials."

=== 29 June ===
Israeli forces shot and killed a 25-year-old Palestinian member of the Islamic Jihad during a raid on Jenin.

=== 30 June ===
Palestinian gunmen fired on Jewish worshippers at Joseph's Tomb, sparking a gun battle in which 17 Palestinians, two Israeli civilians and one IDF commander were injured. Palestine Islamic Jihad claimed responsibility for the attack stating that it was in retaliation for the killing of one of their group's operatives the previous day in Jenin.

== July ==
=== 2 July ===
The UN, OCHA issued the Protection of Civilians Report covering the period 14–27 June 2022. During the reporting period, there were 96 Israeli military search and arrest operations in the West Bank, 5 (60 year to date) Palestinians were killed by Israeli forces and 0 (12 year to date) Israelis were killed by Palestinians, and 39 Palestinian-owned structures were demolished.

In a statement, the local UN Human Rights Office said that the number of Palestinians killed by Israeli security forces in the West Bank and east Jerusalem increased by 46% in the first half of 2022, compared to the previous year. "In a number of incidents, it appears that lethal force was used by Israeli forces as a first rather than as a last resort to confront the alleged threat," and "Lack of accountability for these violations remains pervasive. Such impunity also allows further violations to occur," the UN report said. The report acknowledged the complex security situation in which Palestinians killed 18 people in a series of four attacks within Israel between March and May.

=== 3 July ===
A 17-year-old Palestinian died from his wounds, sustained in an IDF raid on Jaba, a village in the Jenin governorate, the day before. Israeli forces said that the deceased threw a Molotov cocktail at soldiers.

=== 4 July ===
The Gazan family of a 32-year-old Gaza resident said that he was assaulted and later died after he and other Palestinians were caught after trying to cross the barrier near Tulkarm in the West Bank. Israeli forces told Middle East Eye they were "not aware of any such event with involvement of IDF soldiers."

=== 6 July ===
During clashes Israeli forces shot a 20-year-old Palestinian in Jaba' south of Jenin. The IDF said "The force gave medical treatment to the suspect, but later pronounced him dead". The deceased was a terror suspect, and the IDF said he was shot as he tried to escape during arrest.

Palestinian Authority President Mahmoud Abbas and Ismail Haniya of Hamas, met publicly in Algeria for the first time in over five years. Recently, Algeria has promoted intra-Palestinian reconciliation.

=== 7 July ===
An IMPACT-se study finds that UNRWA's study materials continue to contain antisemitism, incitement to violence, and erasure of Israel from maps.

On July 15, UNWRA announced the results of a review following the allegations made in the IMPACT-se report. The Agency review concluded "that the self-learning materials cited in the report are not authorized for use in any UNRWA school." The agency also said "IMPACT-se is an organization already well known for its previous sensationalized attempts to delegitimize the Agency's work. Stenseth reminded [Agency] partners that this organization's latest report was consistent with its other sensationalized work, characterized in a robust 2021 academic review undertaken by the Georg Eckart Institute on behalf of the European Commission as "marked by generalizing and exaggerated conclusions based on methodological shortcomings,"".

=== 11 July ===
The UN annual report Children and Armed Conflict was released. Commenting on Israel, Secretary General António Guterres wrote "Should the situation repeat itself in 2022, without meaningful improvement, Israel should be listed". In 2021, the report said that "Israeli security forces killed 78 Palestinian children, maimed another 982 and detained 637 Palestinian children."

=== 16 July ===
After several rockets were fired at Israel from the Gaza Strip, causing no damage, the Israeli military stated it had targeted an underground facility which it believed to be used for the production of rocket materials in central Gaza, in what was the IDF described as a significant setback of Hamas rocket production capabilities. After two more rockets were fired from Gaza, the Israeli military said it had struck another weapons production facility the IDF said belonged to Hamas.

=== 17 July ===
A 17-year-old Palestinian killed an Israeli police officer who was manning a roadblock in a suspected car ramming on highway 4 near Ra'anana. After criticism over the restrictiveness of open fire rules, the Israeli police commissioner clarified that officers are permitted to fire at those endangering them.

=== 22 July ===
The UN, OCHA issued the Protection of Civilians Report covering the period 28 June to 18 July 2022. During the reporting period, there were 166 Israeli military search and arrest operations in the West Bank, 3 (63 year to date) Palestinians were killed by Israeli forces and 0 (11 year to date) Israelis were killed by Palestinians, and 51 Palestinian-owned structures were demolished.

=== 24 July ===
The Palestinian health ministry said two Palestinians, 25 and 28 years old and members of the Al-Aqsa Martyrs Brigade, were killed during a raid by Israeli forces on Nablus. In November, a Palestinian seriously wounded during the raid, succumbed to his wounds.

=== 26 July ===
The Palestinian health ministry said that a 60-year-old Palestinian shot and critically injured by Israeli occupation soldiers at the Huwwara checkpoint, south of Nablus, succumbed to his wounds on 29 July. The mayor of Huwwara said that the victim was "mentally disabled". According to Israeli forces, soldiers "spotted a suspect approaching them at a military post", fired a warning shot after "receiving no response" and then "The suspect continued approaching the soldiers who responded with fire toward him. A hit was identified."

=== 28 July ===
The Palestinian health ministry and witnesses said a 16-year-old Palestinian was killed by Israeli forces in Al-Mughayyir, Ramallah during a protest by Palestinians against settler violence. Israeli forces said that the army had responded after Palestinians burned tyres and threw stones and the army had "worked to restore order" after "clashes erupted between Palestinians and settlers, which involved throwing stones at one another".

== August ==
=== 1 August ===
A 17-year-old Palestinian was killed and Bassam al-Saadi, a senior Palestinian Islamic Jihad leader in West Bank, was arrested by the IDF after a gun battle when it raided the Jenin refugee camp.

=== 4 August ===
According to a statement, Hamas leader Ismail Haniyeh said during a phone conversation with Tor Wennesland, the UN special coordinator for the Middle East peace process, that the threats of Israeli Defence Minister Benny Gantz against the Gaza Strip were unacceptable.

=== 5 August ===
Tor Wennesland, United Nations Special Coordinator for the Middle East Peace Process reportedly visited the home of arrested Palestinian Islamic Jihad leader Bassem Saadi in Jenin and met with his family members as part of efforts to prevent an escalation between Israel and the PIJ.

Israeli airstrikes on Gaza killed at least ten Palestinians, including a 5 old, and wounded another 55, according to the Gaza health ministry. Israel said it was targeting the Islamic Jihad militant group in response to threats made by the group following Israel's arrest of al-Saadi earlier in the week. Islamic Jihad said that Taysir al-Jabari, a commander of the Al-Quds Brigades, died in an air strike on an apartment in the Palestine Tower.

The UN, OCHA issued the Protection of Civilians Report covering the period 19 July to 1 August 2022. During the reporting period, there were 143 Israeli military search and arrest operations in the West Bank, 3 (66 year to date) Palestinians were killed by Israeli forces and 0 (11 year to date) Israelis were killed by Palestinians, and 44 Palestinian-owned structures were demolished.

=== 9 August ===
The Palestinian Ministry of Health said 3 Palestinians were killed and 40 wounded during a raid by Israeli forces on Nablus. The dead included 18-year-old Ibrahim al-Nabulsi, a senior commander of the al-Aqsa Martyrs Brigades, another militant and a 16-year-old. Subsequently, on 23 August a 25-year-old Palestinian youth succumbed to wounds received during the clash.

During clashes that broke out across the West Bank following the killing of al-Nabulsi earlier in Nablus, Israeli forces killed a 17-year-old Palestinian in Hebron, according to the Health Ministry.

=== 14 August ===
A 26-year-old Israeli citizen and Palestinian resident of East Jerusalem carried out a shooting attack in Jerusalem on a bus carrying Jewish worshippers near the Western Wall, wounding 8, including a pregnant woman whose child, emergency delivered, "is in serious but stable condition." The attacker turned himself in six hours later.

=== 15 August ===
Israeli forces shot and killed a 21-year-old Palestinian during a raid at his home in Kufr Aqab. Israeli media cited the IDF as saying they opened fire in response to a stabbing attempt. According to WAFA, citing the victim's family, there was no stabbing attempt and said the soldiers admitted they had made a mistake and came to the wrong house.

=== 18 August ===
Clashes erupted in Nablus between Palestinians and the Israeli army which was guarding Jewish worshippers travelling to Joseph's Tomb. An 18-year-old Palestinian was killed and over 30 wounded in Nablus according to the Palestinian Red Crescent, Israeli forces said the deceased was shooting at soldiers, denied by Palestinians.

Israeli security forces raided and shut down seven Palestinian human rights and civil society organizations based in the West Bank. The organizations, six of them designated "terrorists" a year earlier in a highly criticized move, are Al Haq, Addameer, Defense for Children Palestine (DCIP), Bisan Center for Research and Development, Union of Agricultural Work Committees, Union of Health Work Committees, and Union of Palestinian Women's Committees. Material from their offices was confiscated, and their entrances were blocked with metal plates. State Department spokesman Ned Price stated that the United States was concerned about the raids, and the United Nations and the International Federation for Human Rights condemned the closures.

=== 19 August ===
A 58-year-old Palestinian was shot during a raid by Israeli forces in Tubas and later succumbed to his wounds. Al Jazeera was unable to verify a video that appears to show the victim "unarmed and attempting to enter a store before being shot." Israeli forces said in a statement that "During the activity in the village of Tubas, a number of armed men threw Molotov cocktails and opened fire at the forces who responded with fire".

The UN, OCHA issued the Protection of Civilians Report covering the period 2 August to 15 August 2022. During the reporting period 41 (107 year to date) Palestinians were killed by Israeli forces and 0 (11 year to date) Israelis were killed by Palestinians. In addition a Palestinian was killed by either Israeli forces or Israeli settlers in the West Bank and 13 more Palestinians were killed between 5–7 August by either Israeli forces or Palestinian armed groups in the Gaza Strip. Details concerning the latter are being investigated by the UN. There were 141 Israeli military search and arrest operations in the West Bank and 55 Palestinian-owned structures were demolished.

== September ==
=== 1 September ===
According to the Palestinian health ministry, Israeli forces killed a 25-year-old Palestinian during a raid on Balata refugee camp, east of Nablus.

A 26-year-old Palestinian was killed shortly after the raid on Balata, in Umm al-Sharayet, south of Ramallah and el-Bireh. The IDF said they had conducted operations in el-Bireh and "confiscated funds that were suspected to be destined for terrorism".

=== 2 September ===
Israeli forces shot a Palestinian who stabbed and wounded an Israeli soldier. The Palestinian health ministry said the Palestinian, who resided in the Dheisha refugee camp near Bethlehem, died of his wound.

=== 3 September ===
The UN, OCHA issued the Protection of Civilians Report covering the period 16 August to 29 August 2022. During the reporting period 2 (109 year to date) Palestinians were killed by Israeli forces and 0 (11 year to date) Israelis were killed by Palestinians. There were 108 Israeli military search and arrest operations in the West Bank and 55 Palestinian-owned structures were demolished.

=== 4 September ===
At least 2 Palestinian gunmen opened fire on a bus carrying Israeli soldiers in the Jordan Valley, injuring 7 (2 moderately, including the bus' civilian driver). The soldiers returned fire, and a pair of suspects were apprehended, both covered in severe burns after their vehicle caught fire. A third suspect evaded capture.

Subsequently on 14 October, one of the pair arrested, a 17-year-old Palestinian from the refugee camp of Jenin, succumbed to his wounds.

=== 5 September ===
Four Israeli soldiers were lightly injured after an improvised explosive device was thrown at them near Halamish. A manhunt was launched, and the entrance to the nearby town of Nabi Salih was closed.

Israeli forces killed a 19-year-old Palestinian during a raid near Jenin. Israeli forces said "..rioters hurled rocks, explosive devices and Molotov cocktails at the forces and shots were heard in the area...The soldiers responded with live fire, hits were identified."

=== 6 September ===
Dozens of Israeli military jeeps entered Jenin to enforce a punitive demolition of the house of Ra'ad Hazem who killed three people in a shooting attack in Tel Aviv last April. A 29-year-old Palestinian was killed and at least 16 other Palestinians wounded. The raid lasted for several hours, Palestinian youth threw rocks and armed clashes with Palestinian fighters broke out. The IDF said that Israeli troops came under "massive gunfire".

Subsequently on 11 September one of those wounded, a 24-year-old Palestinian, died from his wounds.

=== 7 September ===
In the latest of what are now daily raids in the West Bank, Israeli forces killed a 20-year-old Palestinian during a raid on the Far'a refugee camp near Tubas. The army said that Palestinians had thrown an improvised explosive device and fired at soldiers. The victim's uncle witnessed the killing and said he was "in an open area, exposed to the soldiers".

=== 8 September ===
Israeli forces shot and killed a 17-year-old Palestinian near Beitin, Palestinian officials confirmed. The military said he struck a soldier with a hammer, lightly wounding him.

=== 14 September ===
An Israeli soldier and two Palestinians, 22- and 23-years-old, were killed during a firefight near the security barrier north of Jenin. The Israeli army said it had been carrying out "a suspect arrest procedure, during which the suspects shot at the fighters" and that "[A major] was killed overnight during operational activity adjacent to the Gilboa Crossing during an exchange of fire". Fatah identified the Palestinians as members of the al-Aqsa Martyrs Brigades, one being a PA intelligence officer. The Jenin Brigades said in a statement the Palestinians were fighters killed after engaging in "intense armed clashes with occupation forces".

=== 15 September ===
Israeli forces killed a 17-year-old Palestinian in a raid on Kufr Dan near Jenin. Three other Palestinians were injured, one critically.

=== 17 September ===
The UN, OCHA issued the Protection of Civilians Report covering the period 30 August to 12 September 2022. During the reporting period 7 (116 year to date) Palestinians were killed by Israeli forces and 0 (11 year to date) Israelis were killed by Palestinians. There were 125 Israeli military search and arrest operations in the West Bank and 47 Palestinian-owned structures were demolished.

=== 20 September ===
A Palestinian man from Qalqilya suspected of killing an 84-year-old Israeli woman in Holon was found hanged in central Tel Aviv the following day in an apparent suicide. The man had been diagnosed with schizophrenia.

=== 22 September ===
A 22-year-old Palestinian assailant from the Ramallah area attacked people with a knife and pepper spray close to the Shilat junction near Modiin, lightly wounding eight Israelis before being shot dead by an off-duty policeman, according to the Israeli police. According to AP, "there was no way to immediately verify the account."

=== 24 September ===
Israeli forces killed a Palestinian who allegedly tried to ram his car into a group of soldiers patrolling near Nablus. According to AP, "there was no way to immediately verify the account." WAFA reported that the Palestinian was a 36-year-old schoolteacher and father of three children.

=== 25 September ===
Israeli forces shot and killed a suspected Palestinian gunman, according to Israeli and Palestinian reports. The army said "Overnight, during IDF routine activity, IDF soldiers spotted armed suspects driving in a vehicle and motorcycle adjacent to the city of Nablus" and "IDF soldiers responded by firing towards the armed suspects. Hits were identified." Militant group The Lions' Den said one of their number was killed.

=== 28 September ===
Israeli forces killed four Palestinians and injured 44 during a raid on the Jenin refugee camp. Al-Aqsa Martyrs’ Brigade said that three of the men killed were members. One of the dead worked as a Palestinian Authority (PA) intelligence officer. Two were killed when their house was hit by a missile. The army said that it shot "two suspects involved in a number of recent shooting attacks". The raid started at eight in the morning and clashes continued till midday.

Subsequently on 10 October, a 12-year-old Palestinian succumbed to wounds received during the raid.

=== 29 September ===
The Palestinian health ministry said that a 7 year old Palestinian died after falling from a height near Teqoa, south of Bethlehem, while being chased by IDF forces. The Army Radio, without citing sources, said the boy was throwing stones at soldiers. According to WAFA, who had earlier attributed a similar report to Beit Jala hospital, the child's father said later that soldiers chased his son to their house, that his son tried to run away but that apparently his heart stopped and he fell dead. The Jerusalem Post has reported that an initial investigation by the IDF found no connection between soldiers' operations in the area and the death of the child although the incident was still under investigation. According to Axios, an IDF official said that the commander on the ground spoke to the boy's father "on the doorstep." and that "it was a calm conversation and no violence was used", adding that shortly after the conversation, the soldiers left and only after that did the boy collapse. On 29 September 2022, the U.S. State Department demanded an "immediate and thorough" investigation into the death.

On 6 October 2022, the Israeli military released the results of its investigation, finding no connection between the child's death and the army's operation at the time. The Associated Press said that the Israeli military "cleared itself of wrongdoing".

== October ==
=== 1 October ===
The Palestinian Ministry of Health said that Israeli forces killed an 18-year-old Palestinian in al-Eizariya, east of Jerusalem. Israeli police said he was killed after hurling Molotov cocktails. Israeli border police said the Palestinian was attempting to throw a firebomb.

The UN, OCHA issued the Protection of Civilians Report covering the period 13 to 26 September 2022. During the reporting period 6 (123 year to date) Palestinians were killed by Israeli forces and 1 (12 year to date) Israelis were killed by Palestinians. There were 120 Israeli military search and arrest operations in the West Bank and 47 Palestinian-owned structures were demolished.

=== 2 October ===
According to the Israeli NGO HaMoked, Israel is holding 798 Palestinians in administrative detention, without trial or charge, the highest number since 2008.

=== 3 October ===
Israeli forces killed 2 Palestinians during a raid in the Jalazone refugee camp near Ramallah. The military "alleged that the men tried to ram their car into soldiers, a claim that could not be independently verified."

=== 5 October ===
Israeli forces killed a 21-year-old Palestinian man who allegedly shot at Israeli forces during a military raid on Deir al-Hatab, east of Nablus. At least 6 other Palestinians were injured, including two journalists covering the raid for Palestine TV.

=== 7 October ===
Israeli forces killed a 17-year-old Palestinian during clashes in Al-Mazra'a al-Qibliya, northwest of Ramallah. Witnesses said that soldiers opened fire during clashes between residents and Israeli settlers. The military said rioters hurled rocks at settlers and Israeli forces. Separately a 14-year-old Palestinian was killed by Israeli forces in Qalqilya.

=== 8 October ===
Two 17-year-old Palestinians were killed and at least 11 others injured by Israeli forces during an arrest raid in Jenin refugee camp, according to the Palestinian Ministry of Health. The camp is known as a stronghold of Palestinian militants. The Israeli military said it arrested a 25-year-old Islamic Jihad operative who had previously been imprisoned by Israel and had recently been involved in shooting attacks on Israeli soldiers. The military claimed that Israeli soldiers opened fire when dozens of Palestinians hurled explosives and shot at them. According to the Associated Press, 2022 is now the "deadliest year of violence in the occupied territory since 2015."

A Palestinian gun shot and killed an 18-year-old Israeli Border Policewoman and injured two others, one critically, at a security checkpoint at the entrance to the east Jerusalem neighborhood of Shuafat. In a statement, UN Special Coordinator for the Middle East Peace Process Tor Wennesland said he is "alarmed by the deteriorating security situation, including the rise in armed clashes between Palestinians and Israeli security forces in the occupied West Bank, including East Jerusalem" and "The mounting violence in the occupied West Bank is fueling a climate of fear, hatred and anger. It is crucial to reduce tensions immediately to open the space for crucial initiatives aimed at establishing a viable political horizon".

=== 11 October ===
A 21-year-old IDF soldier was seriously wounded and later succumbed to his injuries after being shot by Palestinian gunmen in a drive-by shooting near the West Bank settlement of Shavei Shomron. Two assailants escaped by car. The soldier had been securing a march held by settlers protesting recent shootings in the West Bank. Lions' Den claimed responsibility for the attack.

=== 12 October ===
Israeli forces killed an 18-year-old Palestinian in al-Aroub refugee camp according to the Palestinian health ministry. The military said soldiers pursued people who were throwing rocks towards vehicles on a road near the camp stating "[Soldiers] spotted the suspects adjacent to the refugee camp … and responded with live fire towards them. A hit was identified."

=== 14 October ===
A 20-year-old Palestinian, identified by the Jenin Brigades as a member, and a 43-year-old doctor were reported as killed during an Israeli raid in Jenin according to the Palestinian health ministry. The Times of Israel reported that Palestinian media reports said The Al-Aqsa Martyrs Brigades claimed the doctor as a member.

Later, a spokeswoman for the Israeli army told AFP "A [23-year-old] Palestinian fired towards Beit-El, wounding one of its residents, and was shot dead by Israeli soldiers who were in the area".

=== 16 October ===
A 31-year-old Palestinian wounded on 15 October during a raid by Israeli forces on the town of Qarawat Bani Hassan near Salfit died from his wounds.

The UN, OCHA issued the Protection of Civilians Report covering the period 27 September to 10 October 2022. During the reporting period 13 (136 year to date) Palestinians were killed by Israeli forces and 1 (13 year to date) Israelis were killed by Palestinians. A further 5 Palestinians and 1 Israeli were killed between 11 and 15 October, outside the reporting period. There were 145 Israeli military search and arrest operations in the West Bank and 27 Palestinian-owned structures were demolished.

=== 20 October ===
A Palestinian man was shot dead after opening fire on security guards at the entrance of the Ma’ale Adumim settlement in East Jerusalem, injuring one. The deceased gunman was identified as the suspect wanted in connection with a shooting attack that killed an 18-year-old Israeli Border Policewoman and wounded 2 other soldiers on 8 October.

In response to the shooting, Palestinians began a one-day general strike and called for confrontations with Israeli forces. At the same time, the Palestinian health ministry announced that a 16-year-old Palestinian succumbed to wounds sustained one month ago when shot by Israeli forces.

=== 21 October ===
According to the Palestinian Health Ministry, Israeli forces killed a 19-year-old Palestinian during clashes in Jenin. Israeli forces also arrested the cousin of a deceased Palestinian fighter killed during a raid on 28 September.

=== 22 October ===
Israeli forces killed a 32-year-old Palestinian at a checkpoint southeast of Qalqilya according to Palestinian health officials. The military said a vehicle hit a soldier and left the scene, that "The soldiers fired toward the vehicle" and “The soldier did not need medical treatment. We are aware of reports regarding a hit. The incident is under review.".

A 23-year-old man Israeli man was stabbed in the back and severely wounded by a 16-year-old Palestinian in the East Jerusalem neighborhood of French Hill. After a pursuit, the suspect was shot and critically wounded by Israeli security forces after refusing to comply with their demands. Israeli police subsequently entered the Shuafat refugee camp to retrieve the suspect's father and brother for interrogation. The police alleged that when they entered the camp, rioters assaulted them with stones, irons and firecrackers. Three police officers were lightly injured, and a number of vehicles were damaged.

=== 23 October ===
A 33-year-old Palestinian was killed in what Fatah said was an assassination. The Lions' Den group claimed the deceased as a member and said that Israel was responsible. The Israeli military refused to confirm any involvement.

=== 25 October ===
Israeli soldiers killed 5 Palestinians and injured more than 20 during an extensive raid on Nablus. The army said "“A joint force of IDF soldiers, Shin Bet security service agents and anti-terror forces raided a hideaway in Nablus's old city that was being used as a bomb workshop by central members of [Lions'] Den." the IDF said in a statement released following the raid. The Palestinian health ministry named the fatalities as Hamdi Ramzy, 30, Ali Antar, 26, Hamdi Sharaf, 35, Wadee al-Houh, 31, and Mishaal Baghdadi, 27. The IDF said al-Houh, a leader of the group allegedly responsible for many attacks, was a "main target of the operation."

Subsequently, a 20-year-old Palestinian was killed by Israeli forces in Nabi Saleh, north of Ramallah, during protests over the Nablus raid.

A 55-year-old Israeli resident of Kedumim that was moderately to severely injured in a stabbing attack in the West Bank village of Al Funduq, subsequently died on 8 November from his wounds, according to the IDF Spokesperson's Unit.

=== 28 October ===
(Note conflicting accounts). Two Palestinians, a 47- and a 35-year-old, were killed by Israeli forces. Al Jazeera said the circumstances of their killing are unclear. The Israeli army said its forces were "carrying out an operation close to the Hawara checkpoint" and "identified two suspicious vehicles and fired at them," according to Israeli media. According to Al Arabiya, Israeli forces received reports "regarding a shooting attack from a moving vehicle" on a military target near Nablus while Haaretz and Israeli media in earlier reports said the incident was preceded by a shooting attack on soldiers at the checkpoint.

Special coordinator for the Middle East peace process Tor Wennesland told the UN Security Council that "mounting hopelessness, anger and tension have once again erupted into a deadly cycle of violence that is increasingly difficult to contain," and "too many people, overwhelmingly Palestinian have been killed and injured." calling for immediate action to calm "an explosive situation" and renewed Israeli-Palestinian negotiations.

=== 29 October ===
According to the Palestinian Red Crescent, a 35-year-old Palestinian gunman from Hebron was killed by Israeli forces outside the Israeli settlement of Kiryat Arba. According to the army, the gunman entered Kiryat Arba from Hebron via the Ashmoret crossing and opened fire, killing a 49-year-old Israeli settler and injuring his son before shooting at responding medics and security guards. 3 Israelis were injured, including one seriously. A Palestinian man was also reported lightly injured. According to Haaretz the gunman was "run over by the settlement's military security coordinator while holding an M-16 rifle, and then shot dead by an off-duty military officer after shooting at Israelis in a store near the Ashmoret checkpoint." According to the Washington Post, security camera footage showed the gunman "firing his assault rifle outside a grocery before a security guard rammed him with his truck and pinned him to the ground. An off-duty military officer then opened fire and killed the assailant".

=== 30 October ===
The Israeli military said a Palestinian driver drove his car into a group of soldiers at a bus stop near Jericho, and continued on to a nearby intersection where other soldiers were standing. As a result, five soldiers suffered light or moderate injuries. An Israeli police officer and armed civilian who were at the scene shot the motorist dead. In a video, according to the Washington Post, "two Israelis are seen firing over a dozen bullets at the man as he stands outside his vehicle." The Palestinian was a 49-year-old from Azariya.

== November ==
=== 2 November ===
UN, OCHA, issued the Protection of Civilians Report covering the period 11 to 24 October 2022. During the reporting period 8 (144 year to date) Palestinians were killed by Israeli forces and 1 (14 year to date) Israelis were killed by Palestinians. A further 10 Palestinians and 1 Israeli were killed between 25 and 30 October, outside the reporting period. There were 157 Israeli military search and arrest operations in the West Bank and 6 Palestinian-owned structures were demolished.

Israeli forces killed a 54-year-old Palestinian from occupied Beit Duqqu according to the Palestinian health ministry. The Israeli army said "The assailant got out of his vehicle with an axe to attack the officer, who fired at the attacker and neutralised him" and "The officer was seriously injured and taken to hospital." According to witnesses, Israeli soldiers opened fire on the Palestinian.

=== 3 November ===
During a raid on the home of the Palestinian that was killed on 2 November, Israeli forces killed a 42-year-old Palestinian. The Israeli army said that Palestinians hurled rocks and petrol bombs and they responded with live fire.

According to the Israeli police, a Palestinian who stabbed a police officer in Jerusalem's Old City was killed by police officers, in occupied East Jerusalem. The officer was lightly wounded.

The Palestinian Ministry of Health said a Palestinian was killed in an Israeli raid on Jenin refugee camp. According to the Jerusalem Post, citing Palestinian media, the 28-year-old Palestinian was a member of Palestine Islamic Jihad and reportedly killed in an exchange of fire. Also killed was a 14-year-old from Burqin.

US Secretary of State Antony Blinken called outgoing Prime Minister Yair Lapid and voiced "his deep concern over the situation in the West Bank, including heightened tensions, violence and loss of both Israeli and Palestinian lives, and underscored the need for all parties to urgently de-escalate the situation."

=== 4 November ===
Israeli airstrikes targeted what Israeli sources claimed was a Hamas facility in the Maghazi refugee camp of central Gaza after four rockets were fired at Israel. One rocket was intercepted and the other three fell short in Gaza. Israeli reports said the rockets were a response to the Israeli army's killing of an Islamic Jihad member in Jenin on 3 November.

In a call to Palestinian Authority President Mahmoud Abbas, US Secretary of State Antony Blinken said that the US is "exerting efforts" to "end the current escalation" between Palestinians and Israeli forces. Blinken also reaffirmed the US commitment to a two state solution.

=== 5 November ===
Israeli forces killed an 18-year-old Palestinian near Ramallah according to the Palestinian health ministry. The Israeli army said soldiers responded to "a report about stone hurling toward a highway" that had caused damage "to a number of cars" and that soldiers "responded with fire toward the perpetrators. Hits were identified".

=== 9 November ===
(conflicting reports) A 17-year-old Palestinian was killed during clashes near Joseph's Tomb, east of Nablus. The army said it was protecting civilians visiting Joseph's Tomb and troops returned fire including at the Palestinian placing an explosive device in the area. Reports indicate that the device exploded in his hands.

According to Palestinian sources, Israeli forces killed a 29-year-old Palestinian near Jenin. The IDF said a soldier guarding the barrier saw a Palestinian vandalizing it, initiated an arrest procedure and then shot him.

The UN, OCHA issued the Protection of Civilians Report covering the period 25 October to 7 November 2022. During the reporting period 15 (159 year to date) Palestinians were killed by Israeli forces and 1 (15 year to date) Israelis were killed by Palestinians. The report said "Measured as a monthly average, 2022 is the deadliest year for Palestinians in the West Bank since the United Nations started systematically counting fatalities in 2005." There were 144 Israeli military search and arrest operations in the West Bank and 54 Palestinian-owned structures were demolished.

=== 14 November ===
Israeli troops killed a 15-year-old autistic Palestinian girl in Beitunia, near Ramallah. The military said the soldiers opened fire on a vehicle that was accelerating towards them and the incident is under review. The driver was subsequently released after an investigation was unable to find an intention to commit an attack.

=== 15 November ===
An 18-year-old Palestinian from Hares in the northern West Bank killed three Israelis at the Ariel settlement and wounded four others in a stabbing attack before being shot by Israeli forces.

=== 21 November ===
During an arrest raid on Jenin, Israeli forces shot an 18-year-old Palestinian who later died of his wounds.

=== 23 November ===
Israeli forces killed a 16-year-old Palestinian and wounded four others during a raid in Nablus. One of the injured later succumbed to his wounds.

A 16-year-old Israeli Canadian was killed in one of two suspected bomb blasts at bus stops in Jerusalem. 18 people were injured, 4 seriously. On 26 November, a second victim, a 50-year-old, succumbed to his wounds. A Palestinian with an Israeli residence card was subsequently arrested on 29 November (announced on 27 December after a news blackout was lifted). The suspect is said to have acted alone and to identify with ISIS ideology.

=== 26 November ===
The UN, OCHA issued the Protection of Civilians Report covering the period 8 to 21 November 2022. During the reporting period, 5 Palestinians were killed by Israeli forces and 4 Israelis were killed by Palestinians. There were 110 Israeli military search and arrest operations in the West Bank, and 36 Palestinian-owned structures were demolished.

=== 29 November ===
Israeli forces killed five Palestinians in the West Bank. Two Palestinian brothers, 22- and 21-years-old, were killed during clashes with Israeli soldiers in Kafr Ein. The IDF said it was reviewing the incident. Another Palestinian was killed when an Israeli jeep came under attack in Beit Ummar. A 20-year-old Israeli woman was seriously wounded in what the military said was a car-ramming attack near the entrance to the Migron outpost. The alleged attacker was shot dead. Later in the day, another Palestinian was killed by Israeli soldiers in al-Mughayyir. According to the BBC the Israeli army said soldiers used live ammunition in response to a suspect "spotted hurling Molotov cocktails [petrol bombs]" at them but that "video evidence and eyewitnesses suggest this wasn't the case when he was struck." Israeli human rights group B'Tselem are investigating the death and say that a significant number of cases of protesters being shot dead this year amount to "excessive use of force".

=== 30 November ===
Israeli forces shot a 25-year-old Palestinian during an arrest raid on Yabad and he later died from his wounds.

== December ==
=== 1 December ===
Two Palestinians, 26 and 27-years-old, were killed during a raid by Israeli troops on the Jenin refugee camp. The Jenin Battalion of Islamic Jihad's al-Quds Brigades said that the men killed were two of its leaders.

The Israeli military confirmed that the Netzah Yehuda Battalion will be moved to the Golan Heights by end year. Members of the battalion have been implicated in past cases of abuse including the Death of Omar Assad, which led to an outcry from the US government.

=== 2 December ===
(conflicting reports) A 22-year-old Palestinian was killed by an Israeli soldier in an incident at Huwwara checkpoint, Nablus. Israeli border police said that several suspects approached police and one took out a knife and stabbed one of the officers, who then shot and killed the suspect. The Palestinian Red Crescent say that Israeli security forces blocked emergency responders from providing assistance. A later report by The New Arab says that their review of a video shows no evidence of the victim having attempted to stab Israeli officers. Instead, they say it shows a scuffle between the Palestinian and a border guard who then "reached for a gun and shot the unarmed man", continuing to shoot even when the man was immobilized on the ground. The United Nations Middle East envoy, Tor Wennesland, on Twitter, said he was "horrified" by the killing and the European Union said it was concerned by what "appears to be an excessive use of force by Israeli security forces". On 4 December, both the UN and the EU condemned the killing, called for an investigation and those responsible to be held accountable while the Israeli authorities stood by their version of events.

=== 5 December ===
Israeli forces killed a 22-year-old Palestinian during an arrest raid on Dheisheh refugee camp near Bethlehem.

=== 7 December ===
A 32-year-old Palestinian opened fire at a military post near the settlement of Ofra. The army said that IDF soldiers returned fire, chased the vehicle and when the driver exited the car and fired at them, the soldiers shot and killed the man near his home in Silwad.

=== 8 December ===
Israeli forces killed three Palestinians in an arrest raid on Jenin, the latest of almost daily raids in the West Bank. According to Palestinian sources, two of the three were 29 years old and the third was 46.

A 15-year-old Palestinian was killed by Israeli forces, who said Palestinians were hurling stones and bottles filled with paint at cars driving near Beit Aryeh-Ofarim settlement north-east of Ramallah. Two others were wounded.

=== 11 December ===
Israeli forces killed Jana Zakarneh, a 16-year-old Palestinian girl, during a raid on Jenin. She was shot four times while standing on the roof of her house. The military said it was "aware of the allegation of a Palestinian female's killing" and was investigating. Israel subsequently said the killing was unintentional and dismissed claims that the shooting was deliberate.

=== 16 December ===
The UN, OCHA issued the Protection of Civilians Report covering the period 22 November to 5 December 2022. During the reporting period, 13 Palestinians were killed by Israeli forces and 0 Israelis were killed by Palestinians. A further six Palestinians including two children were killed outside the reporting period between 7 and 11 December. There were 118 Israeli military search and arrest operations in the West Bank, and 60 Palestinian-owned structures were demolished.

=== 22 December ===
Israeli forces killed a 23-year-old Palestinian during clashes that broke out between soldiers escorting settlers to St. Josephs Tomb and local residents. The military said Palestinians had thrown explosives and fired at them. The victim was from nearby Tubas.

The UN, OCHA issued the Protection of Civilians Report covering the period 6 to 19 December 2022. During the reporting period, 6 Palestinians were killed by Israeli forces and 0 Israelis were killed by Palestinians. There were 144 Israeli military search and arrest operations in the West Bank, and 58 Palestinian-owned structures were demolished.

=== 23 December ===
An Arab-Israeli resident of Kafr Qasem was shot and killed after attacking and wounding three police officers in what law enforcement purported to be a premeditated act of terrorism. According to police, the assailant called police to the parking lot of a building, citing a domestic violence incident. Upon the arrival of the police officers, he attempted to open fire with a makeshift submachine gun, which seemingly jammed. The assailant retreated into the building and then hurled Molotov cocktails at a police vehicle before entering his car and ramming it into the officers and another vehicle. Three of them were lightly wounded. Police claim a number of Molootov cocktails were found on the roof of the building and that a knife was found in his vehicle. CCTV footage of the incident was released. The assailant's family denied the incident was a premeditated attack. They said that the officers should have shot at his legs instead of killing him and accused them of murdering their son "in cold blood".”

Palestinian gunmen opened fire at the frequently targeted settlement of Shaked. Minor damage was caused to a home and no casualties were reported. Palestinian Islamic Jihad claimed responsibility for the shooting but did not provide any evidence.

== See also ==
- 2022 in Israel
- 2022 in the State of Palestine
