= Palestinian NGOs Network =

Umbrella organization of Palestinian non-government organizations

- PNGO
- Formation: 1993
- Type: Umbrella organization
- Purpose: Coordination and cooperation between Palestinian NGOs
- Headquarters: Ramallah, Palestinian territories
- Website: www.pngo.net/en

The Palestinian NGOs Network (PNGO or PNGO Net) is an umbrella organization of about 30 Palestinian non-government organisations (NGOs) in the Palestinian territories formed to enhance coordination, consultation and cooperation between member NGOs, strengthen Palestinian civil society, and contribute to the establishment of a Palestinian state. PNGO was formed in September 1993, and as of January 2020, had 135 member NGOs operating in the West Bank, Gaza Strip and East Jerusalem.

PNGO operates through committees of members working in five sectors: health, democracy and human rights, women and children, rehabilitation and agriculture. PNGO's role is to establish general guidelines and coordinate the NGOs work but has no line authority on the NGOs.

PNGO is a member of the Boycott, Divestment and Sanctions (BDS) movement. Individual PNGO members, such as Defense for Children International – Palestine, also promote BDS and are active participants in lobbying the UN, EU, foreign governments, and other international bodies that promote this agenda.

== Funding of NGOs ==
Each member NGO obtains separate funding for its activities and projects from donors, including foreign governments, international organisations, charities, etc., which all form part of the international aid to Palestinians.

In January 2020, the European Union (EU) inserted a clause into their new grant contracts to prohibit recipients from working with and funding organizations and individuals designated on the EU's terror lists; Article 1.5 of Annex II listed in the "General conditions applicable to European Union-financed grant contracts for external actions". The PNGO vehemently opposed the new requirement: media reports stated the PNGO's position was that Palestinian terrorist organizations are in fact "political parties." According to the PNGO, the EU sent a "clarification letter" on 30 March 2020, which specified that the EU provision only applies to persons explicitly named in its restrictive list and emphasized that no Palestinian persons are included in that list, and that the provision is limited to "financial procedures", adding: "The EU does not ask any civil society organization to change its political position towards any Palestinian faction or to discriminate against any natural person based on his/her political affiliation". The EU reaffirmed its position in April 2021, saying the EU must "thoroughly verify" that its funds are not "allocated or linked to any cause or form of terrorism and/or religious and political radicalization." Any funds that did go to any person or organization with terrorist ties must be "proactively recovered, and recipients involved are excluded from future union funding."

According to research by NGO Monitor, a pro-government Israeli monitoring group focused on sources and uses of Palestinians' civic society organizations' funding, has alleged that at least 70 NGO officials are affiliated with the PFLP and that between 2014 and 2021 numerous European governments gave over €200 million to the NGO network, which they claim is linked to the PFLP - some of which was used to finance terrorism.

== Outlawing of Palestinian NGOs by Israel ==
On 22 October 2021, Israel designated Addameer, Al-Haq, Bisan Center for Research and Development, Defence for Children International – Palestine, Union of Agricultural Work Committees and the Union of Palestinian Women's Committees as terrorist organizations.

On 18 August 2022, Israeli forces raided the headquarters of the six along with the Union of Health Work Committees (outlawed in 2020) in Ramallah and al-Bireh, removed computers and equipment and ordered their closure. Hussein Al-Sheikh tweeted his condemnation of the action. Michael Sfard, lawyer for Al-Haq, said "Let's recall that this is all happening after the government failed to convince the European countries who one by one determined that there is no basis for the accusations against the organizations. An urgent international intervention is needed to protect Palestinian human rights defenders from the Israeli dictatorship."

== Members ==
Each member NGO has its own area of activity and is affiliated to related international organisations (which may in turn be affiliated with other entities) and attends international conferences at which it may present papers on its area of interest.

Members of PNGO include:

- Al-Haq
- Addameer
- Alternative Tourism Group
- BADIL
- Defence for Children International - Palestine
- Jerusalem Legal Aid and Human Rights Center (JLAC)
- Applied Research Institute - Jerusalem (ARIJ)
- Miftah
- Women's Centre for Legal Aid and Counseling (WCLAC)
- Union of Agricultural Work Committees (UAWC)
- Young Women's Christian Association (YWCA)
- Palestinian Agricultural Relief Committees (PARC)
- Arab Thought Forum
- Democracy and Workers' Rights Center
- Ramallah Center for Human Rights Studies (RCHRS)
- Health, Development, Information and Policy Institute (HDIP)
- Health Work Committees (HWC)
- Palestinian Medical Relief Society (PMRS)
- Palestinian Academic Society for the Study of International Affairs (PASSIA)
- Women's Studies Center

== See also ==
- Palestinian Environmental NGOs Network
