= List of Palestinian rocket attacks on Israel in 2022 =

The following is a list of Palestinian rocket attacks on Israel in 2022.

== April ==
- April 18: The first rocket launch from Gaza in 6 months was launched towards Kissufim and Ein Hashlosha. The rocket was intercepted midair by the IDF.
- April 20: Two rockets were launched from Gaza towards Israel. One landed inside Gaza, injuring a person, and one landed in the northern part of the Gaza Envelope.
- April 22-23: Palestinians launch several rockets towards Israel but all landed within the strip or open areas adjacent to the strip. In response, Israel closed the Erez Crossing to Palestinian workers crossing into Israel for work.

== August ==
- August 5-7, 2022: 1175 rockets were fired at Israel, with around 200 rockets falling in the Gaza Strip or in the Sea. On at least three incidents Palestinian civilians were killed by misfired rockets that landed in the Gaza Strip, amounting to 11 people killed.

== November ==
- November 3, 2022: 4 rockets fired from the Gaza Strip at Israel. 3 rockets fell inside the Gaza Strip.
- November 7, 2022: Test-fire rockets launched towards the sea.

== See also ==
- Timeline of the Israeli–Palestinian conflict in 2022
