= Al-Haq =

Palestinian human rights organization

- الحق
- Founded: 1979; 47 years ago
- Type: Non-profit
- Purpose: Documenting human rights violations by parties to the Israeli–Palestinian conflict
- Location: Ramallah, West Bank
- Region served: Palestinian territories
- Key people: Lily Feidy (Chairperson); Amin Thalji (Vice Chairperson); Shawan Jabarin (Director); Ghassan Abdullah (Treasurer)
- Website: www.alhaq.org

Al-Haq (Arabic: الحق, romanized: al-Ḥaqq; transl. "the Truth" or "the Right") is a Palestinian non-governmental human rights organization based in the city of Ramallah in the West Bank. Founded in 1979, Al-Haq monitors and documents human rights violations committed by parties to the Israeli–Palestinian conflict, issuing reports on its findings and producing detailed legal studies. It is in special consultative status with the United Nations Economic and Social Council (ECOSOC) since 2000.

Al-Haq has been affiliated with the Geneva-based International Commission of Jurists and is a member of the International Federation for Human Rights, Habitat International Coalition and the World Organisation Against Torture. It also is part of EuroMed Rights' Executive Committee and the Steering Committee of the Palestinian NGOs Network.

== Early years ==
Al-Haq was established in 1979 by a group of Palestinian lawyers. According to Al-Haq, it was one of the first human rights organizations set up in the Arab world.

During its early years, Al-Haq was largely engaged in analyzing Israel's legal status as an occupying power in the West Bank, East Jerusalem and the Gaza Strip, as well as the structures put in place by its governmental authorities. Al-Haq was a forerunner in researching the application of humanitarian law in these circumstances and helped shape the debate on what laws and regulations were applicable in the OPT. It was during this period that Al-Haq established a legal unit to advance its positions in the legal sphere.

By 1986, it had started taking on projects involving human rights issues of specific concerns, like women's and labour rights. It was this work that helped Al-Haq earn international recognition.

Middle East analyst Mouin Rabbani noted that, from its outset, Al-Haq has been as involved with understanding its environment as it has been with pursuing changes. The need for an organization like this stemmed from both the "incomprehensible" judicial system in the Occupied Territories and its "arbitrary implementation". Rabbani also said that in "an accurate reflection of these concerns, legal research, as opposed to human rights monitoring and intervention as narrowly understood, assumed pride of place during al-Haq's formative period," and Al-Haq still defines itself as both a human rights and legal research organization.

== Issues and campaigns ==
=== Human rights accusations ===
Al-Haq's 2012 report into Operation Pillar of Defense stated that the Gaza strip was subjected to "indiscriminate and disproportionate Israeli attacks". The report found that 173 Palestinians were killed including 113 civilians, of whom 38 were children and at least 1,221 injuries, of which 445 are to children.

Al-Haq's 2009 report on its findings in relation to the 2008/09 Gaza War stated that the Israeli offensive had led to 1,409 Palestinian deaths including 1,172 civilians, of which 342 were children; and over 5,000 wounded. According to the report, "[e]xcessive civilian casualties were compounded by the unprecedented destruction of civilian infrastructure across the Gaza Strip including hospitals, schools, mosques, civilian homes, police stations and United Nations compounds.

In July 2008, Al-Haq said that more than 1,000 people had been detained by Fatah and more than 1,000 by Hamas within the previous year and that 20%-30% had been tortured.

In June 2005, Al-Haq condemned the execution of four convicts in Gaza by the PA. Al-Haq said that four were killed without notice: "[t]hree were hanged and one was shot". It mentioned that dozens of Palestinians await execution, particularly those sentenced by the State Security Court and "may not have been granted a fair trial".

In 1996, Al-Haq charged Palestinian police tortured to death Mahmoud al-Jamil—a member of the Fatah Hawks organisation who was imprisoned in Nablus jail in the West Bank.

Al-Haq's position on PLO assassinations of collaborators has been the topic of discussion. Al-Haq claimed that, because the authorities were responsible for keeping order, the killings were not human rights violations and were at worst common crimes. Al-Haq said that the "network of informers" and "agents of the state" were executed by an aroused citizenry, acting spontaneously. The Jerusalem Post, commenting on Al-Haq's position on the PLO killings, noted that the "mutilation-murders of young boys and girls, housewives, pregnant women and old men...did not fit the pacific image the PLO was trying to project". The Post also noted that although Al-Haq did not condone the killings in its human-rights report, it did not condemn them either.

Yasser Arafat would later clarify the PLO involvement, telling an Egyptian newspaper that he dealt with each file of the executed, if not before the killing then definitely after. PLO spokesman Bassam Abu Sharif said that the procedure is that the suspect is warned three times to change his or her ways before taken to trial and given a chance to repent. Shariff reported that only after this would the accused be executed.

=== Relations to Israel ===
Al-Haq and its counterpart, the Israeli human rights organization B'Tselem, were co-recipients of the Carter-Menil Human Rights Prize in 1989, and of the Geuzenpenning, a Dutch human rights award, in 2009. In the 1990s, Israel's Ambassador to the United States, Moshe Arad, accused Al-Haq of being a front for Arafat's PLO and stated that "most of its members are supporters of Fatah and other members of the PLO terrorist organization".

While conscious of internal human rights abuses within the Palestinian community, Al-Haq views Israeli presence in the West Bank and the Gaza Strip as "the root of the conflict in our region."

When Al-Haq accepted the 2009 Geuzen Medal, its representative said that the international community needs to increase its efforts, citing Al-Haq's case against the UK government for "failing to fulfill its obligations under international as well as domestic UK law." The representative also expressed his desire for the Netherlands to "become the site of accountability for Israeli international crimes" and said Al-Haq, in line with its conviction to protect human rights, would never shy away from internal challenges in the West Bank and Gaza.

Al-Haq showed support for a 2012 wave of Palestinian hunger strikes in protest of Israeli administrative detention of a 33-year-old member of Palestinian Islamic Jihad.

Al-Haq board members have expressed their feelings of doubt towards a two-state solution. One wrote that "If there cannot be two states, there will be one, and it will have a Palestinian majority." Another said that a two-state solution looks increasingly unlikely. He went on to say that birthrates suggest Jews will eventually be a minority once again, and "unless continued military occupation and all-out apartheid is the desired path, now may be the time for Israelis to start putting in place the kinds of legal and constitutional safeguards that will protect all minorities, now and in the future, in a single democratic state of Israel-Palestine. This is both the right thing and the smart thing to do."

=== World Conference against Racism ===
Al-Haq was an active participant in the World Conference against Racism held in Durban in 2001. In 2002, the organization issued a substantial report based on its conference concept paper. The conference turned into an argument about whether Zionism was equivalent to racism and whether the West should apologize for the Atlantic slave trade. Both the U.S. and Israel withdrew their delegations in reaction to what they called antisemitic language.

=== Al-Haq and Palestinian groups ===
The Palestinian Centre for Human Rights (PCHR) condemned an attack launched by members of the General Intelligence Service (GIS) on al-Haq staffers in Ramallah. The staffers were documenting GIS's attempts to stop an assembly organized to protest against the Palestinian National Authority's decision to participate in direct negotiations with Israel. The PCHR called upon the government to respect freedoms and encourage respect done by human rights organizations.

=== Al-Haq legal cases ===
In November 2006, Al-Haq brought a case in the UK Court of Appeal against the British government to end export licenses to Israel to "secure the implementation of the July 2004 [ICJ] Advisory Opinion on Israel's Wall". The case was dismissed in November 2008.

In February 2009, Al-Haq, with solicitor Phil Shiner of Public Interest Lawyers (PIL), filed a claim for judicial review before the High Court of England and Wales challenging the British government over its failure to fulfill its alleged "obligations under international law with respect to Israel's activities in the Occupied Palestinian Territory". The case was dismissed in July 2009, and the dismissal was affirmed by an appellate court in February 2010.

In March 2010, Al-Haq filed a criminal complaint alleging that a Dutch company, Riwal, "was complicit in the commission of war crimes and crimes against humanity through its construction of the Annexation Wall, 'the Wall,' and illegal settlements in the Occupied West Bank." The complaint was dismissed in May 2013.

=== Operation Cast Lead ===
In April 2009, Al-Haq issued a position paper titled "Operation Cast Lead and the Distortion of International Law". The paper is a legal analysis of Israel's claim to self-defence under Article 51 of the United Nations Charter as a justification for its military operation in the Gaza Strip.

== Travel bans on Shawan Jabarin ==
Al-Haq's general director, Shawan Jabarin, has been prevented by Israel from traveling outside of West Bank since 2006. Shin Bet claims Jabarin is a member of the Popular Front for the Liberation of Palestine, and that "his travel may endanger regional security" but refuses to disclose evidence on the grounds that it is classified. Jabarin has been detained on at least two previous occasions following convictions in Israeli courts on the charge that he has engaged in activity on behalf of the PFLP, once for nine months in 1985 and once in 1994. Jabarin denies membership saying that he has worked for Al-Haq since 1987. Israeli and international human rights organizations sent letters of protest to Defense Minister Ehud Barak, asking that Jabarin be allowed to travel and accept the prize.

In 2009, Israel's Shin Bet prevented Jabarin, from travelling to the Netherlands to accept the Geuzenpenning, a prestigious Dutch human rights prize presented by the Geuzen Resistance 1940-1945 Foundation jointly awarded to Al-Haq and B'Tselem. The Supreme Court of Israel was asked to review Jabarin's petition to reverse the travel ban which the petitioners stated "suggests he is being targeted for securing human rights for his people". Previous secret hearings decided in Shin Bet's favour. The court upheld the travel ban. In a previous case in 2008, the Supreme Court reviewed classified intelligence material and concluded that Jabarin was also a senior activists of the Popular Front for the Liberation of Palestine.

In November 2010, Jabarin was again refused permission by Israel to travel, this time to Galway, Ireland, to receive a "distinguished graduate award" at the 10th anniversary celebrations of the NUI's Irish Centre for Human Rights, where he had studied international human rights law from 2004 to 2005.

In addition, Jordan does not allow Jabarin to travel through its territory.

== Jabarin's appointments ==
In February 2011, Jabarin was appointed by Human Rights Watch to its Mideast Advisory Board, which was seen as a controversial appointment since Jabarin was labeled "Dr. Jekyll and Mr. Hyde" by the Israeli Supreme Court, for the dual roles it claimed he held in both the militant organization PFLP, and the human rights organization, Al Haq. The HRW appointment was criticised by Robert L. Bernstein, the founder of HRW, Stuart Robinowitz, a prominent New York attorney who has undertaken human-rights missions for the American Bar Association and Helsinki Watch (the predecessor to HRW) in Yugoslavia, Bulgaria and El Salvador, and Prof. Gerald Steinberg, the president of the Jerusalem-based NGO Monitor.

In May 2013, Jabarin was elected a vice president of the International Federation for Human Rights (FIDH). Jabarin had also been elected Commissioner of the International Commission of Jurists. In August 2016, Jabarin was elected Secretary General of FIDH.

== Awards ==
- 1989 – The Carter-Menil Human Rights Prize (co-recipient with B'Tselem)
- 1990 – Reebok Human Rights Award (awarded to Shabwan Jabarin)
- 2009 – The Geuzen Medal (co-recipient with B'Tselem)
- 2019 – Human Rights and Business Award

== Terrorist designation by Israel ==
In October 2021, Al-Haq was branded a terrorist organization by Israel, together with five other Palestinian non-profit, non-governmental organizations (Addameer, Bisan Center for Research and Development, Defence for Children International – Palestine, the Union of Palestinian Women's Committees and the Union of Agricultural Work Committees). Israel shared its intelligence on the groups with the C.I.A. which in a classified report response said it could find no evidence to confirm Israel's designation of these groups as terrorist.

The designation was condemned by Amnesty International, Human Rights Watch, and the Office of the United Nations High Commissioner for Human Rights, who called it a "frontal attack on the Palestinian human rights movement and on human rights everywhere."

In July 2022, nine EU countries, Belgium, Denmark, France, Germany, Ireland, Italy, the Netherlands, Spain and Sweden, issued a joint statement saying they will continue working with the six Palestinian organisations that Israel had banned because Israel had failed to prove that they should be considered terrorist groups.

On 18 August 2022, Israeli forces raided the headquarters of the six along with the Union of Health Work Committees (outlawed in 2020) in Ramallah and al-Bireh, removed computers and equipment and ordered their closure. Hussein Al-Sheikh tweeted his condemnation of the action. Michael Sfard, lawyer for Al-Haq, said "Let's recall that this is all happening after the government failed to convince the European countries who one by one determined that there is no basis for the accusations against the organizations. An urgent international intervention is needed to protect Palestinian human rights defenders from the Israeli dictatorship."
