= Gisha =

Gisha گیشا Kuy-e Nasr کوی نصر
- Neighborhood
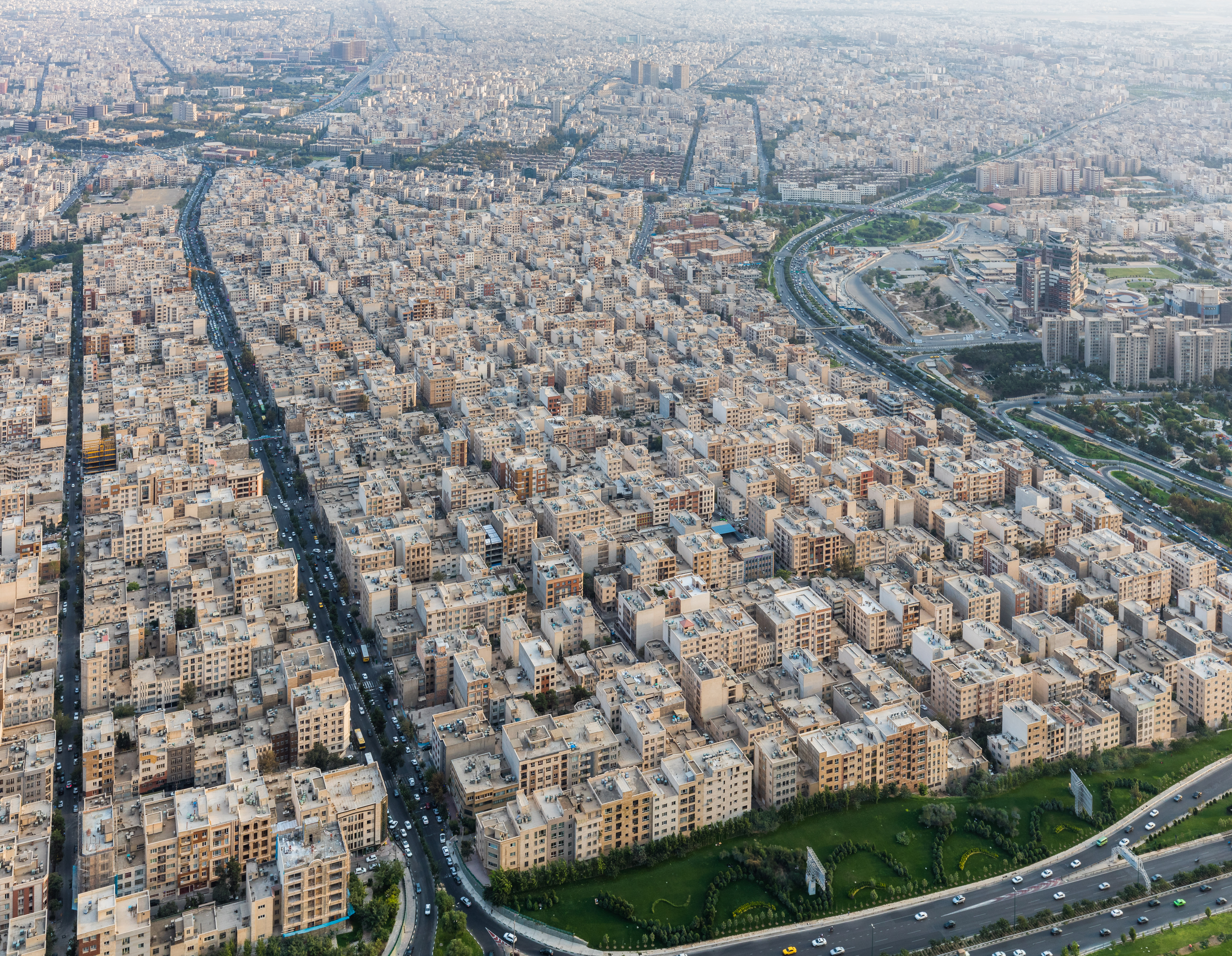
- Aerial view of the Gisha neighbourhood
- Interactive map of Gisha
- Location in Tehran Location in Iran
- Coordinates: 35°44′13″N 51°22′38″E
- Province: Tehran
- City: Tehran
- District: Districts 2
- Time zone: UTC+3:30 (IRST)
  - Summer (DST): UTC+4:30 (IRDT)

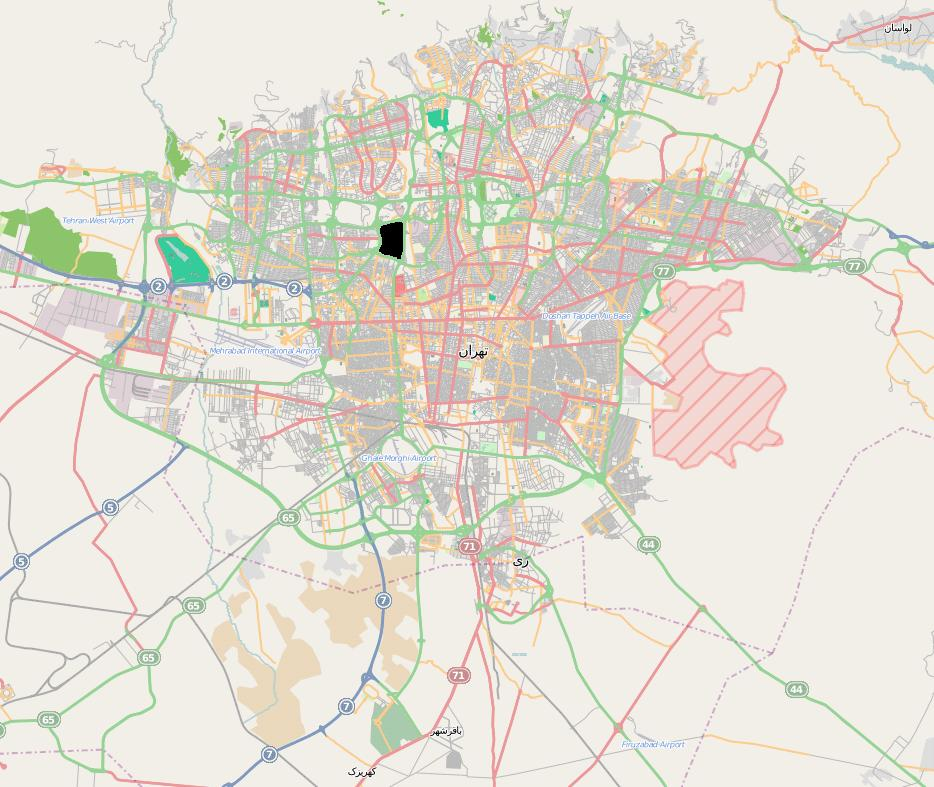
Location of Guisha (black)

Gisha or Guisha (Persian: گیشا, also called Kuy-e Nasr, کوی نصر), originally Kisha (from the names of its two founders, "Keynejad" and "Shapourian"), is a neighborhood in Tehran, Iran. The neighborhood was known as a center for youth recreation, shopping, and dating. Guisha is home to the marketplace Bazzar-e Nasr (بازار نصر). The Iranian Bank of Agriculture is also headquartered in Guisha.

== History ==
In 2017, Gisha's newly constructed Orsi Khaneh residential apartment block won the Residential Project of the Year award at the 10th annual Middle East Architect Awards in Dubai.
