= Union of Agricultural Work Committees =

Palestinian non-profit organization

- Founded at: 1986
- Type: Agricultural development institution
- Website: uawc-pal.org

The Union of Agricultural Work Committees (UAWC) is a Ramallah-based Palestinian non-profit organization that was established in 1986 to improve the performance and professionalism of Palestinian farmers. The Union also aims to help Palestinian farmers market their produce and provides agricultural employment opportunities through a framework of cooperation with domestic, Arab, and international agricultural development institutions.

== History ==
Established in Jerusalem in 1986 by a group of agronomists loosely affiliated with the Popular Front for the Liberation of Palestine (PFLP) UAWC is one of the oldest Palestinian non-governmental organizations.

In 1993, UAWC developed its organizational structure, consisting of a general assembly, board of trustees, general director, and two executive directors; one for the West Bank and one for the Gaza Strip.

UAWC initially focused on forming Agricultural Cooperatives and Committees in the different Palestinian rural areas of the West Bank and the Gaza Strip.

UAWC is a member of the Palestinian NGOs Network and supports the Boycott, Divestment and Sanctions campaign against Israel.

In 2021, it was designated as a terrorist organization along with 5 other NGOs (Addameer, Al-Haq, Bisan Center for Research and Development, Defence for Children International – Palestine, and the Union of Palestinian Women's Committees), by the Israeli government. The designation was condemned by UN and human rights organizations and on 23 February 2022, France, in a statement to the United Nations Security Council, said that "In the absence of evidence, France will continue to support these organisations." In July 2022, nine EU countries (Belgium, Denmark, France, Germany, Ireland, Italy, the Netherlands, Spain and Sweden) issued a joint statement saying they will continue working with the six Palestinian organisations that Israel had banned because Israel had failed to prove that they should be considered terrorist groups.

On 18 August 2022, Israeli forces raided the headquarters of the six organisations along with the Union of Health Work Committees (outlawed in 2020) in Ramallah and al-Bireh, removed computers and equipment and ordered their closure.

== Funding ==
UAWC receives funding from governments and aid organizations, including the European Commission, World Vision Australia (WVA), AusAID, and FAO. UAWC has worked with international and local organizations like Action Against Hunger, Oxfam, Save the Children, NARC, and LRC.

In February 2012, the Israeli law organization Shurat HaDin alleged that UAWC was a front for PFLP and that WVA and AusAID were providing financial aid to PFLP. Letters sent to these organizations warned them that they were "personally, criminally and civilly liable under Australian and US law" which could include "liability for future terrorist attacks carried out by the PFLP." A spokesperson for WVA said that there was no evidence to support the allegations but that WVA had suspended its dealings with UAWC pending the outcome of an investigation into the matter. UAWC denied that it had any links to PFLP.

WVA and AusAID resumed working with UAWC after an investigation into the allegations found them baseless. Shurat HaDin, however, continued to threaten legal action against WVA. In a letter to Shurat HaDin, WVA described its allegations as unsubstantiated and in some cases defamatory.

In 2022, Netherlands stopped the funding over alleged ties with PFLP, as it found that 12 employees of the organization were part of the PFLP leadership.

== Affiliate of PFLP ==
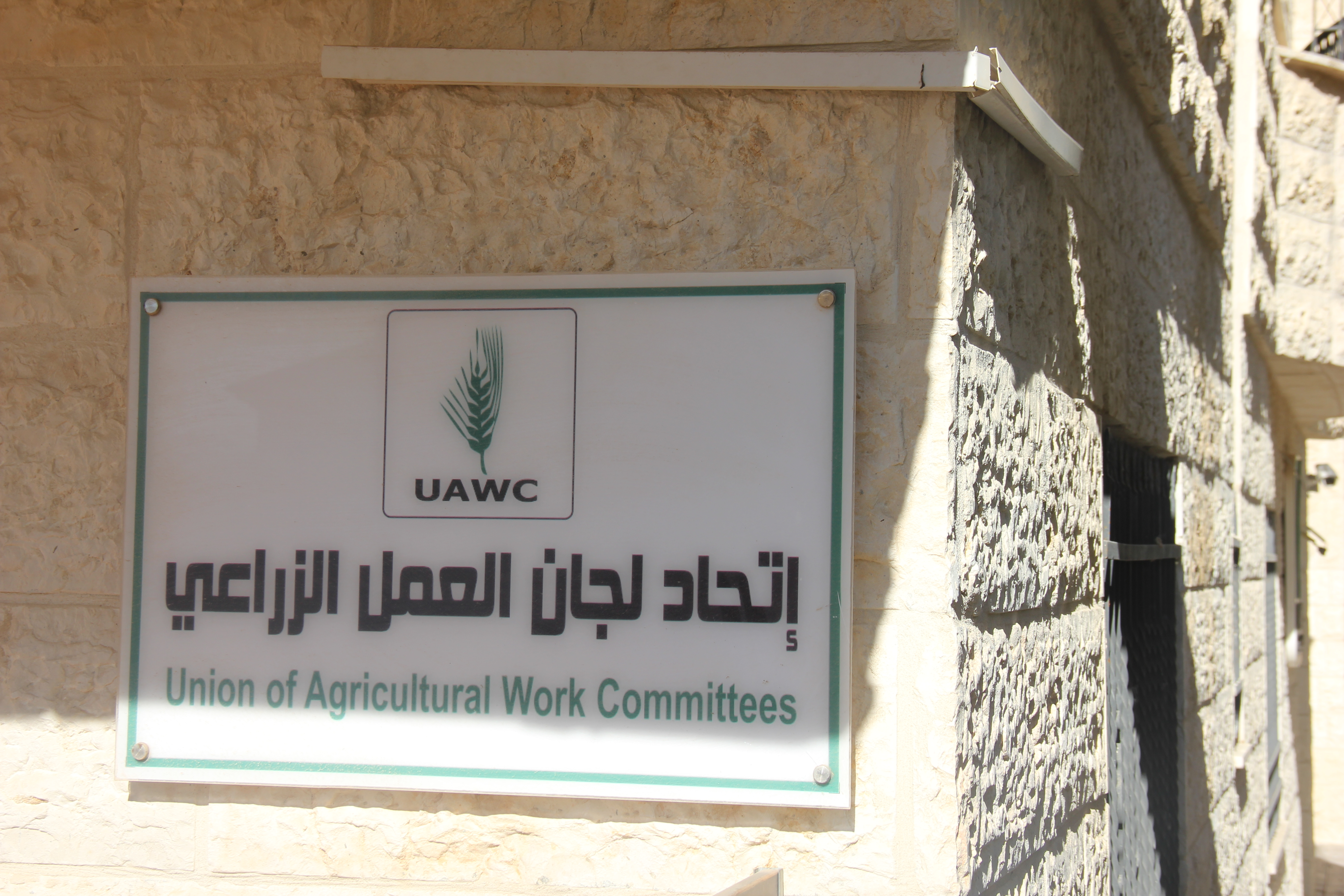
UAWC building

In July 2020, the Dutch government announced that it had suspended funding to UAWC over allegations that it has links to PFLP. The allegations came from the Israeli NGO Monitor, a group that examines nongovernmental organizations involved in the Israel-Palestinian conflict. According to the allegations, UAWC has used money to pay two men Israel accuses of carrying out a bombing in the West Bank that killed an Israeli teen named Rina Shnerb.

In October 2021, the UAWC was designated a terrorist organization by Israel, together with five other Palestinian non-profit, non-governmental organizations. The designation was condemned by Amnesty International, Human Rights Watch, and the UN Office of the High Commissioner of Human Rights who called it a "frontal attack on the Palestinian human rights movement and on human rights everywhere." Israel citing alleged ties to PFLP as the reason. The designation applies within Israel but not in the West Bank.

== Awards and honours ==
- UAWC won the Food Sovereignty Prize in October 2014 which is awarded by the US Food Sovereignty Alliance, an American NGO established to mobilize and educate US and international activists on the "food crisis".
- In November 2014, the UAWC won the Equator Prize for its role in sustainable development and fight against poverty through its Seed Bank project initiative. The award was given by the United Nations Development Agency (UNDP) in New York.

== Notes and references ==
=== Sources ===
- Pfahler, Lennart (26 July 2020). "Terror im Westjordanland: Rina (†17), ihre Mörder und das Geld aus Europa". DIE WELT.
- "Netherlands suspends aid to group that employed suspected Palestinian terrorists". www.timesofisrael.com.
- "Union of Agricultural Work Committees". European Youth Portal.
- Hass, Amira (22 January 2009). "Palestinian farmers are being treated like criminals". Haaretz. Archived from the original on 26 January 2010.
- Le Grand, Chip (18 February 2012). "World Vision to investigate terror link". The Australian. Archived from the original on 18 February 2012.
- Pollard, Ruth (19 October 2012). "Australian aid projects in Gaza under threat". The Sydney Morning Herald.
- Robinson, Glenn E. (1997). Building a Palestinian state: the incomplete revolution. Indiana University Press. p. 54. ISBN 9780253210821. "union of agricultural work committees palestine."
- "Outcry as Israel labels Palestinian rights groups 'terrorists'". Al Jazeera. 22 October 2021.
