= Gerald M. Steinberg =

Israeli political scientists and advocate

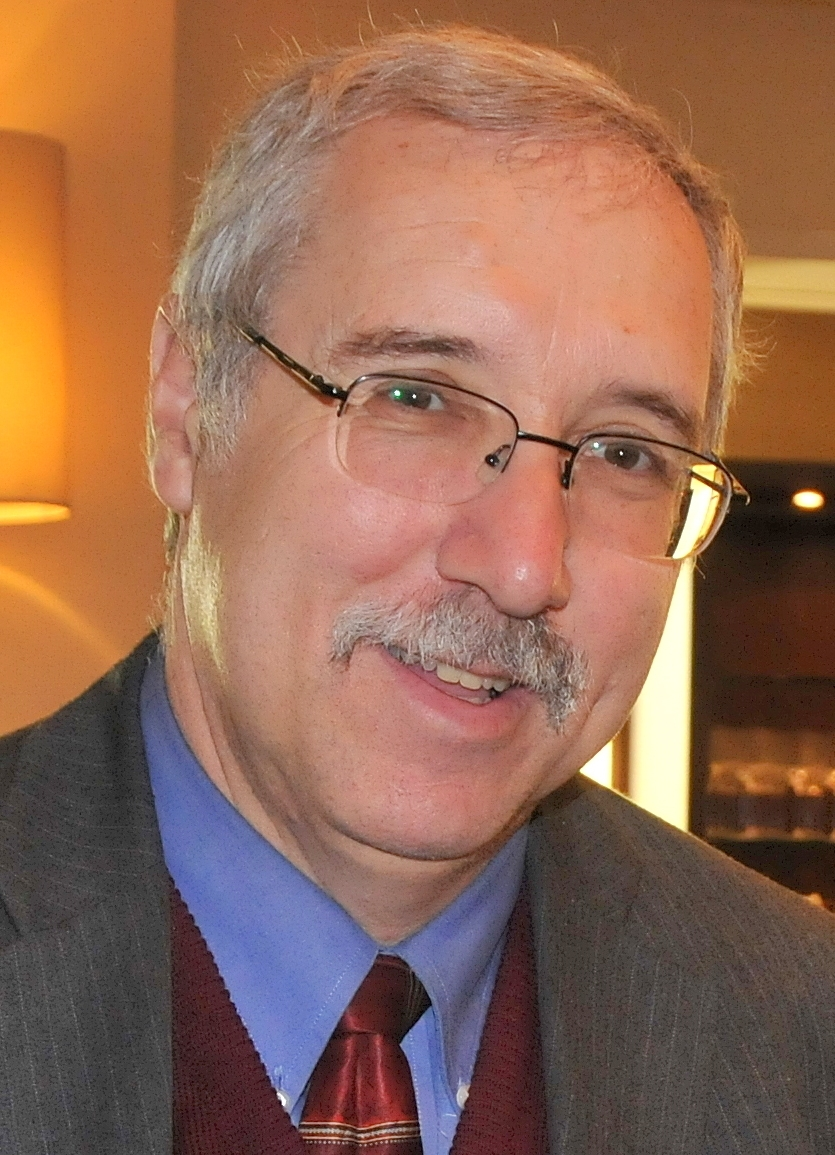
Gerald Steinberg

Gerald M. Steinberg (Hebrew: ג'ראלד שטיינברג) is an Israeli academic, political scientist, and political activist who is a professor of politics at Bar Ilan University. Steinberg is the founder and president of NGO Monitor, a policy analysis think tank focusing on non-governmental organizations.

== Biography ==
Gerald Steinberg was born in the United Kingdom. He completed a joint bachelor's degree in physics and Near Eastern Studies at the University of California, Berkeley, in 1973 and a master's degree in physics at the University of California, San Diego, in 1975. He obtained his doctorate in government from Cornell University in 1981. He began teaching at Bar Ilan University in 1982, and is a professor of political science.

Steinberg has served as a consultant to the Israeli Ministry of Foreign Affairs and to the Israeli National Security Council. He also served as a legislative adviser to Likud Knesset Member Ze'ev Elkin.

== NGO Monitor ==
Steinberg is founder and president of NGO Monitor, a right-wing non-governmental organization based in Jerusalem that reports on international NGO activity from a pro-Israel perspective.

Steinberg has been a longtime critic of Human Rights Watch, Amnesty International, Christian Aid, Oxfam, and other organizations he says have "contributed to the hatred, rather than supporting peace". In a 2004 Jerusalem Post article he wrote, "HRW's press statement exposes it as a biased political organization hiding behind the rhetoric of human rights." Later he accused HRW of "exploiting the rhetoric of human rights to delegitimize Israel". HRW accused Steinberg of "sleight of hand" in his reporting of its activities, and of ignoring its condemnations of Palestinian militant actions.

In 2014, former Associated Press journalist Matti Friedman said that AP reporters had been banned from interviewing Steinberg and NGO Monitor. The AP denied the claim.

=== Court case ===
In January 2010, after the European Commission refused to release documents on NGO funding, Steinberg initiated legal action under the EU's Freedom of Information statutes. The court ruled that instability in the Middle East and the prospect that "such information may pose a danger to human rights groups" justified the refusal. The court further found that Steinberg's petition was "manifestly lacking any foundation in law".

Of Steinberg's failed legal action, Israeli attorney Michael Sfard said: "Steinberg invents demons and then chases them. On the way, he convinces the Europeans that the fears for the welfare of Israeli democracy are justified. All the data about the donations of foreign countries to Israeli human rights organizations are published on the Web sites of the organizations, as required by law."

== Criticism ==
Yehudit Karp, a former Israeli deputy attorney general, charged that Steinberg published material he knew to be wrong "along with some manipulative interpretation".

Reporter Uriel Heilman said that Steinberg played "fast and loose" with the facts by repeating comments about the New Israel Fund that Steinberg knew were untrue. In response, Steinberg acknowledged that some of his reports were poorly phrased and promised to correct them.

In The Jerusalem Post, Kenneth Roth wrote that Steinberg shows a "disregard for basic facts" when writing about human rights.
