= Defence for Children International =

Non-governmental organization for children's rights (1979–present)

- Abbreviation: DCI
- Formation: 1979
- Type: INGO
- Purpose: Protecting and promoting children's rights
- Headquarters: International Secretariat in Geneva, Switzerland
- Location: 38 national sections
- Region served: Worldwide
- Website: https://www.defenceforchildren.org

Defence for Children International (DCI) is an international non-governmental organisation (INGO) set up in 1979, during the International Year of the Child, to ensure ongoing, practical, systematic and concerted international and national action specially directed towards promoting and protecting the rights of children, as articulated in the United Nations Convention on the Rights of the Child (UNCRC). Nigel Cantwell was one of its founders and its current president is Khaled Quzmar of Palestine.

== Defence for Children International – Palestine ==
Logo

Defence for Children International – Palestine (DCIP) is an independent, local Palestinian child rights organization established in 1991 to promote the rights of children living in the West Bank, East Jerusalem, and the Gaza Strip. It also investigates and documents human rights violations against children, provides legal services to children in urgent need.

In October 2021, DCIP was designated a terrorist organization by Israel, together with five other Palestinian NGOs: Addameer, Al-Haq, Bisan Center for Research and Development, the Union of Palestinian Women's Committees and the Union of Agricultural Work Committees. This accusation was supported by the pro-Israeli NGO Monitor, which issued a report claiming DCI-P's ties with the Popular Front for the Liberation of Palestine (PFLP), designated a terrorist organisation by the United States, European Union, Canada, and Israel. NGO Monitor alleges that PFLP members have been employed and appointed as board members at DCIP.

The designation of DCIP as a terrorist organisation was condemned by Amnesty International, Human Rights Watch, and the Office of the United Nations High Commissioner for Human Rights who called it a "frontal attack on the Palestinian human rights movement and on human rights everywhere." In July 2022, nine EU countries (Belgium, Denmark, France, Germany, Republic of Ireland, Italy, the Netherlands, Spain and Sweden) issued a joint statement saying they will continue working with the six Palestinian organisations that Israel had banned because Israel had failed to prove that they should be considered terrorist groups.

On 18 August 2022, Israeli forces raided the headquarters of the six organisations along with the Union of Health Work Committees (outlawed in 2020) in Ramallah and al-Bireh, removed computers and equipment, and ordered their closure.

In December 2023, former US State Department official Josh Paul told CNN that the Israeli government had designated DCIP a terrorist organisation after DCIP told the State Department that a 13 year old Palestinian boy had been raped in Israeli custody.

DCIP published a report in March 2026 alleging that about half of Palestinian children held by Israel have not been charged.

DCIP shut down in April 2026, stating that they were "not able to overcome operational challenges resulting from Israel's targeted criminalisation of Palestinian human rights organisations". Human Rights Watch expressed regret over the closure, calling DCIP "one of the most reliable messengers about life for Palestinian children under Israeli occupation."

== See also ==
- Defense for Children International-Palestine et al v. Biden et al
