= Addameer =

Palestinian prisoner support and legal assistance charity

Addameer Prisoner Support and Human Rights Association
- مؤسسة الضمير لرعاية الأسير وحقوق الإنسان
- Formation: 1991; 35 years ago
- Purpose: Prisoner support
- Headquarters: Ramallah, Palestine
- Director: Sahar Francis
- Website: addameer.ps

Addameer (Arabic: الضمير, romanized: aḍ-Ḍamīr, lit. 'Conscience'), officially Addameer Prisoner Support and Human Rights Association (مؤسسة الضمير لرعاية الأسير وحقوق الإنسان, Muʾassasat aḍ-Ḍamīr li-Riʿāyat al-ʾAsīr wa-Ḥuqūq al-ʾInsān), is a Palestinian NGO based in Ramallah, dedicated to monitoring the treatment of and providing legal assistance to Palestinians arrested in the West Bank by Israel and the Palestinian Authority. Israel has designated it a terrorist organization.

== History ==
Addameer was established in 1991. It defines its aims as twofold: support for Palestinian prisoners held in Israeli and Palestinian prisons and the provision of "free legal aid to political prisoners, advocates their rights at the national and international level, and works to end torture and other violations of prisoners' rights through monitoring, legal procedures and solidarity campaigns".

Khalida Jarrar, its former director, has been held repeatedly under administrative detention without trial.

The director of Addameer since 2006 has been Sahar Francis.

== Reaction of the State of Israel ==
=== IDF raids ===
The Israel Defense Forces (IDF) has raided the offices of Addameer, and seized documentation in their care, on four occasions.

==== 2002 ====
The first Israeli raid on Addameer offices was conducted in 2002, during the Israeli invasion of Ramallah in that year.

==== 2012 ====
The second incident took place in 2012. The timing coincided with the expiry of the annual International Human Rights Day. On 11 December, at approximately 3 am, the IDF conducted raids on the offices of Addameer and two other Palestinian NGOs, and from Addameer's offices four computers from the legal and documentation units containing information on prisoners and their cases, a hard drive, a video camera and employees' business cards were confiscated. The soldiers also ripped off and tore up posters of prisoners and hunger strikers pinned on the office walls. In the view of Allam Jarrar of the Palestinian NGO Network, the raid's timing was to be seen in the context of the United Nations General Assembly's recognition of Palestine as a de facto state two weeks earlier, on 29 November.

Executive Director Sahar Francis told Human Rights Watch that video equipment and paper files of prisoner's cases were also missing after the raid. According to a military spokesperson, the raids were based on a suspicion that the three NGOs were affiliated with the Popular Front for the Liberation of Palestine (PFLP), though no evidence has been produced to substantiate the claim, and the NGOs themselves deny the assertion.

The Israeli Human Rights NGO B'Tselem, also in the name of several other human rights organisations such as Gisha and Yesh Din, issued a strong protest, demanding not only the restitution of the confiscated property but that protection be given to civil society organizations, in particular those engaged in upholding the cause of human rights. Human Rights Watch also demanded that compensation be made for the damage caused. Joe Stork deputy Middle East director at Human Rights Watch stated:

In the absence of warrants or demonstrated military necessity, these raids are nothing but an unlawful attempt to seriously harm the work of groups supporting the local population.. The Israeli military needs to justify why it was absolutely necessary to ransack the offices of Palestinian rights groups and seize their property.

==== 2019 ====
At 2 o'clock in the morning of 19 September 2019, an IDF unit broke into the offices of Addameer and after ransacking it, took away, according to the inventory left, "five laptops, memory cards, three laptop memories, one laptop card and several books". According to the Al-Haq NGO, the raid and expropriation was in contravention of several principles of international law: private property in such circumstances is protected; and the pillaged items bore no relation to military needs. The loss of the material caused difficulties for the group at a time when 5,150 Palestinian prisoners, many assisted by Addameer, were incarcerated by Israel, and often in Israel, in contravention again of international law.

==== 2022 ====
On 18 August 2022, Israeli forces raided the headquarters of Addameer and six other organisations in Ramallah and al-Bireh, removed computers and equipment and ordered their closure.

=== Terrorist designation ===
In October 2021, Addameer was designated a terrorist organization by Israel, together with five other Palestinian non-profit, non-governmental organizations (Al-Haq, Bisan Center for Research and Development, Defence for Children International, Union of Palestinian Women's Committees and Union of Agricultural Work Committees). The designation was condemned by Amnesty International, Human Rights Watch, and the UN Office of the High Commissioner of Human Rights who called it a "frontal attack on the Palestinian human rights movement and on human rights everywhere".

In July 2022, nine EU countries (Belgium, Denmark, France, Germany, Ireland, Italy, the Netherlands, Spain and Sweden) issued a joint statement saying they will continue working with the six Palestinian organizations that Israel had banned because Israel had failed to prove that they should be considered terrorist organisations. Reviewing secret Israel intelligence shared with the CIA, the latter could find no evidence to verify the Israeli accusations.

On June 10, 2025, the US Treasury Department imposed sanctions on Addameer along with four other charities, accusing them of supporting terrorist groups including affiliation with the Popular Front for the Liberation of Palestine and Hamas' military wing under the pretense of humanitarian aid. The move was criticized by human rights organizations Human Rights Watch and Amnesty International. Following the sanctions, the website and social media presence of Addameer were taken down. UK Lawyers for Israel claimed responsibility for the takedown following a letter informing the domain name registrar of the U.S. sanctions. The sanctions followed a request from advocacy group Zachor Legal Institute.

== See also ==
- Palestinian prisoners in Israel

== Sources ==
- "Al-Haq Condemns Israeli Occupation Forces Raid on Addameer Prisoner Support and Human Rights Association". Al-Haq. 20 September 2019.
- Ashly, Jaclynn (1 November 2019). "Israeli army arrests Palestinian feminist lawmaker, months after her release". +972 Magazine.
- Bayour, Elham (2005). "Occupied Territories, Resisting Women: Palestinian Women Political Prisoners". In Sudbury, Julia; Oparah, Julia Chinyere (eds.). Global Lockdown: Race, Gender, and the Prison-industrial Complex. Psychology Press. pp. 201–215. ISBN 978-0-415-95057-2.
- "Human rights organizations in Israel condemn the Israeli military's raid on Palestinian Human Rights & Civil Society Organizations". B'Tselem. 12 December 2012.
- "Israel/Palestine: Designation of Palestinian Rights Groups as Terrorists: Attack on the Human Rights Movement". Human Rights Watch. 22 October 2021.
- "Israel: Stop Raids on West Bank Rights Groups". Human Rights Watch. 12 December 2012.
- "Israeli army raids West Bank NGO offices". Al-Jazeera. 12 December 2012.
- "Israeli forces raid offices of several Palestinian CSOs in Ramallah". WAFA. Wafa. 18 August 2022.
- Lis, Jonathan; Shezaf, Hagar (22 October 2021). "Gantz Declares Six Palestinian NGOs Terrorist Organizations". Haaretz.
- Mackenzie, James (18 August 2022). "Israeli forces kill Palestinian in West Bank clashes, medics say". Reuters – via www.reuters.com.
- "Sahar Francis" (PDF). European Parliament.
- Scher, Isaac (22 August 2022). "CIA unable to corroborate Israel's "terror" label for Palestinian rights groups". The Guardian.
- Shezaf, Hagar (12 July 2022). תשע מדינות באירופה: בהיעדר ראיות מישראל, נמשיך לסייע לארגונים האזרחיים בגדה [Nine European countries: In the absence of evidence from Israel, we will continue to assist the civil society organizations in the West Bank]. Haaretz.
- Shezaf, Hagar; Khoury, Jack (18 August 2022). "Israel Raids Outlawed Palestinian Rights Groups' Offices in West Bank". Haaretz. Associated Press.
- The Palestinian Human Rights Organizations Council (12 December 2012). "Raid on offices of three Palestinian NGOs in Ramallah" (PDF). United Nations.
- "UN experts condemn Israel's designation of Palestinian human rights defenders as terrorist organisations". UN Office of the High Commissioner of Human Rights. 25 October 2021.
