= Bisan Center for Research and Development =

Palestinian non-profit organization

- Founded: 1989; 37 years ago
- Type: Non-profit
- Purpose: Funding cultural programmes with the aim of preserving Palestinian identity and civil society
- Region served: Palestine
- Website: bisan.org

The Bisan Center for Research and Development is a civil society non-profit, non-governmental organization in Ramallah, Palestine. It was established in 1989 and is registered with the Palestinian Ministry of Interior.

Bisan works to support Palestinian women through youth organizations, feminist institutions, and community-based organization in marginalized and rural areas in Palestine, including through cultural initiatives encouraging the participation of youth and women. The Bisan Centre also runs a hotline on domestic violence.

In 1990, with funding from Austcare, Bisan founded 22 community centers in the West Bank offering vocational training. At the time, they were also running a center for small scale enterprise and development in Nablus. It also has a legislative unit that lobbies for effective civil legislation, and has historically worked with the Ministry of Health on research studies, including on domestic abuse in the West Bank and Gaza.

The organization has also previously partnered with UNIFEM on hosting women's conferences, including outside of Palestine, for example in Iraq, where it held a civic education workshop on behalf of UNIFEM with the Iraqi Al-Amal Association to train women in women's rights advocacy campaigning.

In October 2021, Bisan was designated a terrorist organization by Israel, together with five other Palestinian non-profit, non-governmental organizations (Addameer, Al-Haq, Defence for Children International – Palestine, the Union of Palestinian Women's Committees and the Union of Agricultural Work Committees). The designation was condemned by Amnesty International, the Human Rights Watch, and the UN Office of the High Commissioner of Human Rights who called it a "frontal attack on the Palestinian human rights movement and on human rights everywhere." In July 2022, nine EU countries (Belgium, Denmark, France, Germany, Ireland, Italy, the Netherlands, Spain and Sweden) issued a joint statement saying they will continue working with the six Palestinian organisations that Israel had banned because Israel had failed to prove that they should be considered terrorist groups. The C.I.A. could find no corroborative evidence to back the Israeli label, though it had access to Israel's intelligence on the issue. The U.S. government has, of August 2022, failed to act on the results of the C.I.A. report. On 18 August 2022, Israeli forces raided the headquarters of the six organisations along with the Union of Health Work Committees (outlawed in 2020) in Ramallah and al-Bireh, removed computers and equipment and ordered their closure.

In November 2021, it was revealed by Frontline Defenders, working with Amnesty International and the University of Toronto's Citizen Lab, that Ubai al-Aboudi, head of the Bisan Center, was among the employees of the targeted groups that were hacked with NSO Group's Pegasus spyware.

In February 2022, the Bisan Center launched "The Bisan Lecture Series", a planned series of discourses on subjects of cultural, scientific, and societal importance aimed at "full integration of Palestine into the global learning community".
