= Union of Palestinian Women's Committees =

Palestinian non-profit organization

Union of Palestinian Women's Committees Society اتحاد لجان المرأة الفلسطينية
- Founded: 1980; 46 years ago
- Type: Non-profit
- Purpose: Empowering Palestinian women to contribute in the Palestinian national struggle
- Region served: Palestinian territories
- Website: upwc.org.ps

The Union of Palestinian Women's Committees (UPWC; Arabic: اتحاد لجان المرأة الفلسطينية) is a Palestinian non-profit organization founded in 1980 "to empower Palestinian women on all levels and to contribute in the Palestinian national struggle against the Israeli military illegal occupation of the Palestinian territories".

In October 2021, UPWC was designated a terrorist organization by Israel, together with five other Palestinian non-profit, non-governmental organizations (Addameer, Al-Haq, Bisan Center for Research and Development, Defence for Children International – Palestine, and the Union of Agricultural Work Committees). The designation was condemned by Amnesty International, Human Rights Watch, and the UN Office of the High Commissioner of Human Rights who called it a "frontal attack on the Palestinian human rights movement and on human rights everywhere."

In July 2022, nine EU countries (Belgium, Denmark, France, Germany, Ireland, Italy, the Netherlands, Spain and Sweden) issued a joint statement saying they would continue working with these six Palestinian organisations that Israel had banned because Israel had failed to prove that they should be considered terrorist groups.

On 18 August 2022, Israeli forces raided the headquarters of the six organisations along with the Union of Health Work Committees (outlawed in 2020) in Ramallah and al-Bireh, removed computers and equipment and ordered their closure.
