= NGO Monitor =

Pro-Israel non-governmental organization

- Founded: 2001; 25 years ago
- Founder: Gerald M. Steinberg
- Type: Non-profit; NGO
- Purpose: Reporting on NGOs claiming to advance human rights and humanitarian agendas
- Location: Jerusalem
- Region served: Israel
- Key people: Gerald M. Steinberg (president)
- Revenue: US$ 385,000 (2008)
- Employees: 14 (November 2025)
- Website: ngo-monitor.org

NGO Monitor is a Jerusalem-based organization that reports on international non-governmental organization (NGO) activity from a pro-Israel perspective. It describes itself as independent and nonpartisan.

NGO Monitor was founded in 2001 by Gerald M. Steinberg under the auspices of the Jerusalem Center for Public Affairs.

NGO Monitor has been criticized by academic figures, diplomats, and journalists for allowing its research and conclusions to be driven by politics, for not examining right-wing NGOs, and for spreading misinformation. A number of academics have characterized NGO Monitor as right-wing or argued that its aims and activities are political in nature.

== Structure and staff ==
NGO Monitor is the central project of the Organization for NGO Responsibility, an independent nonprofit organization registered in Israel. Its president is Gerald M. Steinberg, professor emeritus of political science at Bar-Ilan University.

Its staff includes:

- Gerald M. Steinberg, president
- Naftali Balanson, COO
- Anne Herzberg, legal advisor

As of 2025, NGO Monitor's advisory council members included Elliott Abrams, Alan Dershowitz, Douglas Murray, and James Woolsey. Steinberg has reportedly worked for the Israeli Foreign Ministry and Office of the Prime Minister while heading NGO Monitor.

== Funding ==
The Wechsler Family Foundation is one of NGO Monitor's founding donors. Other acknowledged supporters are Nina Rosenwald and Newt Becker. Since its separation from the Jerusalem Center for Public Affairs (JCPA) and its formation as an independent organization in 2007, NGO Monitor has drawn on a wider range of funding sources. NGO Monitor has said it receives no governmental support and is funded by private donors and foundations, though it did receive some funds, in 2010 and 2011, via the Jewish Agency for Israel (JAFI), a quasi-governmental agency.

Other donors include the Center for Jewish Community Studies (part of JCPA), the Orion Foundation, Matan, Peter Simpson, Nir Ben Josef, Real Property Investment DR. Tuchmen, and Jewish Federations of North America.

According to a February 2012 article by Uri Blau in Haaretz, his examination of NGO Monitor's finances revealed that "the organization sought to block the publication of one contributor and to get hundreds of thousands of Shekels from anonymous sources". The donations in question were channeled through the Jewish Agency for Israel and Matan, and originated with undisclosed donors from outside Israel. In the same article, Jason Edelstein, NGO Monitor's communications director, is quoted as saying "all of our financial information is fully disclosed with the Registrar for Non-Profits as required by law".

A 2015 report published by the Peace Now movement discovered that NGO Monitor failed to file a legally required disclosure regarding the source of its funding, and that many of the group's funding sources are hidden from the public.

NGO Monitor's U.S. sources of funding, as revealed by U.S. tax filings, have included the Abstraction Fund, American Jewish Committee, Ben and Esther Rosenbloom Foundation, CJM Foundation, Jewish Community Federation, Koret Foundation, Lisa and Douglas Goldman Fund, Middle East Forum, MZ Foundation, Network for Good, Paul E. Singer Foundation, Milstein Family Foundation, Newton and Rochelle Becker affiliated charities, Shillman Foundation, Sinder Foundation, Vanguard Charitable Endowment Fund, and the William P. Goldman and Brothers Foundation.

== Activities ==
=== Publications ===
NGO Monitor maintains an online directory of NGOs worldwide, which generally includes a description of each organization, a quote from the organization, its funding sources, and selected quotes about the organization from publications and officials. NGO Monitor also has considerable material related to the first Durban Conference and the Durban strategy of divestment and boycott, as well as considerable discussion of the 2009 Durban Review Conference. NGO Monitor staff have co-authored two books relating to NGOs: Best Practices for Human Rights and Humanitarian NGO Fact-Finding (with founder and president Gerald Steinberg, NGO Monitor's Legal Advisor Anne Herzberg, and NGO Monitor's Best Practices Legal Fellow Jordan Berman) and The Goldstone Report "Reconsidered": A Critical Analysis (with Steinberg and Herzberg). In 2009, NGO Monitor published "Experts or Ideologues: Systematic Analysis of Human Rights Watch", a monograph that includes analysis of key HRW staff members, five case studies of HRW campaigns, and quantitative analysis comparing HRW publications in the Middle East from 2002 to 2009.

In 2004, NGO Monitor released a document comparing Amnesty International's response to the 20 years of ethnic, religious, and racial violence during the Second Sudanese Civil War to its treatment of Israel.

=== Legal activities ===
Rashid Khalidi has called NGO Monitor an organisation that opposes legal means against Israel and at the same time a proponent of the use of legal means against those who criticise Israel. Sabine Lang writes that NGO Monitor has focused on the use of legal means to limit funding to NGOs.

Neve Gordon, writing in Law & Society Review, describes the term as part of a campaign to portray human rights as a national security threat and to impede organizations that expose human rights abuses, using NGO Monitor's activities as one of its main examples.

In January 2010, Steinberg brought a case before the European Court of Justice arguing that it was wrong of the European Commission to withhold some of the contents of over 200 financial documents that NGO Monitor had requested regarding the funding of Israeli and Palestinian NGOs. In November 2012, the court said that NGO Monitor could not receive the financial documents regarding 16 projects of human rights organizations in Israel, calling it "in part, manifestly inadmissible and, in part, manifestly lacking any foundation in law". The EU said "that the Middle East is an unstable region, and therefore such information may pose a danger to human rights groups".

In 2013, NGO Monitor issued a report on the findings of the 2011 Israeli law requiring Israeli non-governmental organizations to disclose financial contributions from foreign donors and governments. The report assessed that foreign funding of Israeli NGOs totalled NIS 34,355,579 in 2012. Steinberg called the new law an "international model for transparency". He also said, "the amount of foreign funding going to NGOs involved in polarizing activity in the context of the Arab–Israeli conflict [is] alarming." The Association for Civil Rights in Israel (ACRI) spokesman Marc Grey said that ACRI's donors were already listed on its website, making the law "redundant", and that the donations allowed organizations to protect human rights and freedoms, adding, "the basis for Israel's relations with democratic countries is shared values – democracy and human rights above all – the State of Israel itself is a recipient of funds from these very same countries, in the framework of trade agreements, investments, loans, and donations." A spokesman for B'Tselem said the information had been published on its website for years and that NGO Monitor is a group of "Israeli government apologists masquerading as an objective watchdog. They do not even practice what they preach in terms of their own transparency and their sloppy, third-rate research."

=== Criticisms of NGOs ===
NGO Monitor criticized the Ford Foundation for funding the 2001 World Conference against Racism, Racial Discrimination, Xenophobia and Related Intolerance in Durban, South Africa. The Ford Foundation has modified its policies regarding funding of NGOs. It also has taken exception to such accusations and says its involvement in the Palestinian territories reflects its belief that a just solution to the conflict is vitally important to the region and the peoples directly affected and that it also funds groups such as the New Israel Fund.

NGO Monitor also criticized B'Tselem, "The Israeli Information Center for Human Rights in the Occupied Territories".

NGO Monitor has criticized the New Israel Fund, which says its primary objective is "to strengthen Israel's democracy". Larry Garber, then executive director of the New Israel Fund, and Eliezer Ya'ari, then NIF's Israel director and a retired Israeli air force major, wrote in an op-ed in The Jerusalem Post that if Israel accepts Steinberg's premises, then "Israel's credibility—and, more important, the nation's morality—will suffer."

With the stated aim of encouraging critical debate on the role of NGOs in the Middle East conflict, NGO Monitor held a 2006 conference in Jerusalem with 21 humanitarian aid groups in attendance. A panel discussed the pros and cons of NGOs dealing with Hamas. NGOs such as Amnesty International, B'Tselem and Physicians for Human Rights were invited to speak but declined. Amnesty International said the conference did "not give a balanced ground for open and fair dialogue" while another human rights group accused NGO Monitor of "partiality".

In 2007, the Applied Research Institute–Jerusalem (ARIJ) and other NGOs successfully sued NGO Monitor for libel after it said the groups "emphasize external issues including the justification of violence". Steinberg was subsequently forced to apologize.

=== Editing Wikipedia ===
In June 2013, NGO Monitor's online communications editor, Arnie Draiman, was indefinitely banned from editing Wikipedia articles about the Arab–Israeli conflict due to biased editing, concealing his place of work, and using a second account in a way Wikipedia policy forbids. Draiman was a major contributor to the articles on NGO Monitor and Gerald Steinberg, and made hundreds of edits on articles about human rights organizations, including B'Tselem, the New Israel Fund, Human Rights Watch, and many others Steinberg opposes.

== Reception ==
Political research conducted at Lund University in 2019 rated NGO Monitor poorly for its "counter-democratic activities" and found that the organization was "heavily involved in [the] denunciation" of human rights NGOs by depicting them as "unprofessional and biased". In all of NGO Monitor's reports, it was found to criticize NGOs that "had a perspective of promoting Palestinian human rights and/or taking a critical stance toward Israeli Government policies vis-à-vis Palestinians". The research also found that NGO Monitor appeared to "be promoting pro-Israel views regarding the conflict in a partisan way" and that, organizationally, NGO Monitor "might be less independent" and "tied to strong political interests and actors".

In 2005, Leonard Fein wrote in The Forward that NGO Monitor is "an organization that believes that the best way to defend Israel is to condemn anyone who criticizes it".

Yehudit Karp, a member of the International Council of the New Israel Fund and a former deputy attorney general of Israel, said that NGO Monitor has released information "it knew to be wrong, along with some manipulative interpretation".

The New Israel Fund said in May 2011 that NGO Monitor "knowingly published false information in its newsletter" about the NIF funding of Coalition of Women for Peace (CWP). NIF said that NGO Monitor's director was given the correct information verbally in advance. NGO Monitor responded by asserting that its report was based on NIF grant information. NIF rejoined that its public records lag the end of the reporting year by several months, but reiterated that updated information was given to NGO Monitor verbally. NIF also said that it asked CWP to remove mention of NIF's name from the CWP website.

Yoaz Hendel, a former adviser to Likud leader Benjamin Netanyahu who is now a columnist at Yediot Aharonot, called NGO Monitor a "serious voice in the field".

In July 2009, HRW issued a statement saying, "NGO Monitor ... conducts no field investigations and condemns anyone who criticizes Israel".

Uriel Heilman, a managing editor for the Jewish Telegraphic Agency (JTA) and a senior reporter for The Jerusalem Post, wrote in an opinion column that there were a "couple of disingenuous (read: inaccurate) elements" in the May 2009 digest of NGO Monitor. Heilman rhetorically asked whether the situation itself was "enough for Steinberg and NGO Monitor's followers without Steinberg having to stretch the truth?" Steinberg later conceded that the statement's phrasing was confusing and revised it.

Kathleen Peratis, a member of the board of Human Rights Watch, called into question the research methodology underlying an op-ed by Steinberg for not saying specifically where or when HRW statements have been unverifiable. In 2006, she criticized NGO Monitor for accusations against HRW and its "executive director, whose father fled Nazi Germany". Peratis took issue with an op-ed by Steinberg titled "Ken Roth's Blood Libel", and argues those like NGO Monitor "who want selective exemption of Israel from the rules of war" may not "have faced the implications of getting what they wish for".

In 2009, David Newman criticized NGO Monitor for concentrating "almost entirely with a critique of peace-related NGOs and especially those which focus on human rights, as though there were no other NGOs to examine". He said that NGO Monitor, which he called a right-wing organization, had consistently refused requests to investigate the activities and funding of right-wing NGOs, many of which, Newman said, were facilitating illegal activity in the West Bank.

In January 2010, 13 Israeli human rights organizations released a common statement calling NGO Monitor and Im Tirtzu "extremist", and criticised an "unbridled and incendiary attack" by them against human rights groups.

The 2013 Menachem Begin Prize was awarded to NGO Monitor, "a leading organization defending the State of Israel and the Jewish people." The Begin Prize is awarded for "extraordinary act(s) for the benefit of the State of Israel and/or the Jewish People." Natan Sharansky said, "NGO Monitor is the leading organization defending the State of Israel and the Jewish people."

Ambassador Andrew Stanley, the EU representative to Israel, took issue with NGO Monitor's description of EU policy as operating in secret, writing, "as Prof. Steinberg is fully aware from the various conversations we have had with him, funding of projects by the European Union worldwide is carried out by open and public calls for proposals published on EU websites, including the website of the Delegation of the European Union to the State of Israel."

Michael Edwards lists NGO Monitor among a group of organisations who use deficiencies in NGO accountability as a pretext for politically motivated attacks to silence views with which they disagree. Edwards writes that they "single out liberal or progressive groups for criticism while ignoring the same problems, if that is what they are, among NGOs allied with conservative views". According to Joel Peters, NGO Monitor's activities include "high profile campaigns with the aim of delegitimizing the activities of Israeli civil society and human rights organisations, especially those advocating the rights of Arab citizens of Israel and/or address the question of violations of human rights in the Occupied Territories", to which NGO Monitor responded, "Our aims and objectives (holding political advocacy NGOs accountable, providing checks and balances, researching and publishing on these issues) are clearly spelled out."

According to Naomi Chazan, NGO Monitor is closely linked to a "tightly knit, coordinated set of associations" whose goal is to undermine liberal voices in Israel and entrench a negative image of them by "continuously hammer[ing] away at their key message—in this instance, the abject disloyalty of certain civil society organizations and their funders and their collusion with Israel's most nefarious external detractors". According to Chazan, "by reinforcing this mantra by every available means, innuendo could be transformed into fact".

In an editorial published by The Forward, J. J. Goldberg called NGO Monitor "one of the smoothest left-bashing operations".

Ilan Baruch, Israel's former ambassador to South Africa, said in a September 2018 report by the Policy Working Group (PWG) that NGO Monitor "disseminates misleading and tendentious information, which it presents as factual in-depth research". NGO Monitor's efforts are designed to "defend and sustain [Israeli] government policies that help uphold Israel's occupation of ...the Palestinian territories". The Dutch government has also criticised NGO Monitor, singling out the unreliability of its accusations against human rights defenders. Dutch Foreign Minister Stef Blok said, "the government is familiar with the accusations by NGO Monitor against a broad group of Israeli and Palestinian human rights organisations, as well as with criticism of the conduct of NGO Monitor itself", citing the PWG report. "This research shows that many of NGO Monitor's accusations are based on selective citations, half-facts and insinuations, but not necessarily on hard evidence", Blok added.

In 2024, the Wikipedia community reached a consensus to prohibit the use of NGO Monitor as a source.

== Political orientation ==
In 2010, NGO Monitor attempted to cut the funding of The Electronic Intifada by the Dutch foundation Interchurch Organisation for Development Cooperation by asserting that the website was "anti-Semitic and frequently compares Israeli policies with those of the Nazi regime." It also said that EI's executive director campaigned to delegitimize and demonize Israel. The ICCO's website praised Electronic Intifada as "an internationally recognized daily news source", functioning as a counterweight to pro-Israeli reportage. The ICCO's chairman, Marinus Verweij, said in reply:

Electronic Intifada ... has become an important source of information from the occupied Palestinian territories. Newspapers such as The Washington Post and the Financial Times have frequently used material from the Electronic Intifada, and the rights of Palestinian people to a decent way of living are central in the news brought by the EI. The EI reports frequently about the violations of human rights and international humanitarian law by the State of Israel. In no way is the EI anti-Israel or anti-Semitic.

EI's Ali Abunimah, answering the accusations, noted that in the "scurrilous" claims, not one piece of evidence from the over 12,000 articles printed by EI since its inception in 2001 had been cited by the NGO.

In a 2009 opinion column for The Jerusalem Post, Larry Derfner wrote: "NGO Monitor doesn't have a word of criticism for Israel, nor a word of acknowledgment, even grudging, for any detail in any human rights report that shows Israel to be less than utterly blameless. In fact, on the subject of Israel's human rights record, NGO Monitor doesn't have a word of disagreement with the Prime Minister's Office."

John H. Richardson, writing for Esquire magazine's website in 2009, called NGO Monitor a "rabidly partisan organization that attacks just about anyone who dares to criticize Israel on any grounds". It notes that Steinberg is dedicated to fighting "the narrative war" and has made a "special project" of attacking Human Rights Watch.

Didi Remez, a former spokesperson for the Peace Now group and former consultant to BenOr Consulting, which was co-founded by Jeremy Ben-Ami of J Street, said NGO Monitor "is not an objective watchdog: It is a partisan operation that suppresses its perceived ideological adversaries through the sophisticated use of McCarthyite techniques – blacklisting, guilt by association and selective filtering of facts".

In an op-ed published in 2005 by The Forward, Leonard Fein, a former professor of politics and Klutznick Professor of Contemporary Jewish Studies at Brandeis University, took issue with NGO Monitor's statement that Human Rights Watch places "extreme emphasis on critical assessments of Israel" and has issued more reports about HRW than on any other of the 75 NGOs it concerns itself with. Fein wrote that HRW had devoted more attention to five other nations in the region—Iraq, Sudan, Egypt, Turkey and Iran—than it has to Israel; but that, despite extensive correspondence, Steinberg had failed to correct the "misleading" statement about HRW on the NGO Watch website. Fein argued that NGO Monitor might not be free of the "narrow political and ideological preferences" of which it accused HRW.

In a 2004 article for the Political Research Associates, Jean Hardisty and Elizabeth Furdon call NGO Monitor a "conservative NGO watchdog group ... which focuses on perceived threats to Israeli interests", adding that "the ideological slant of NGO Monitor's work is unabashedly pro-Israeli. It does not claim to be a politically neutral examination of NGO activities and practices."

Ittijah, Union of Arab Community-Based Organisations in Israel, has said NGO Monitor represents the interests and the say of the Israeli state rather than civil society's voice based on human rights values, and that it is guided by the Israeli Ministry of Foreign Affairs.

According to former New Israel Fund president Naomi Chazan, NGO Monitor is "tied to the national-religious right".

In an op-ed published in The Jewish Journal of Greater Los Angeles in 2016, Noam Shelef wrote that NGO Monitor's leaders are affiliated with the Israeli government and that the organization scrutinizes only progressive critics of government policies.

== Relationship with the Associated Press ==
According to former Associated Press reporter Matti Friedman, the AP bureau in Jerusalem gave "explicit orders to reporters...to never quote [NGO Monitor] or its director, an American-raised professor named Gerald Steinberg." Friedman continues, "In my time as an AP writer moving through the local conflict, with its myriad lunatics, bigots, and killers, the only person I ever saw subjected to an interview ban was this professor."

The AP responded by saying, "There was no 'ban' on using Prof. Gerald Steinberg. He and his NGO Monitor group are cited in at least a half-dozen stories since the 2009 Gaza war."

Examining the evidence, law professor David Bernstein surmises that while there may not have been a written ban, there was a clear bias by the AP in terms of what it chose not to cover and which sources it chose not to use, that the problem "might not primarily be who is being quoted, but whether NGO influence and possible bias are considered newsworthy to begin with."

== See also ==
- Criticism of Amnesty International
- Criticism of Human Rights Watch
- NGOWatch
- Palestinian NGOs Network
