= Killing of al-Najjar children =

Israeli mass killing in Gaza

- Part of the Gaza war, Israeli war crimes in the Gaza war, and the Gaza genocide
- Location within the Gaza Strip
- Location: Khan Yunis, Gaza Strip
- Date: May 23, 2025
- Target: Palestinian family
- Attack type: Airstrikes
- Deaths: 10 (including 9 children)
- Injuries: 1 child
- Perpetrator: Israeli Air Force

On May 23, 2025, the Israel Defense Forces (IDF) bombed a home in the Gazan city of Khan Yunis, belonging to a doctor couple employed at Nasser Hospital. The massacre resulted in the deaths of 9 of the couple's 10 children.

The father of the family, Hamdi al-Najjar, was in critical condition and succumbed to his injuries after several days. A son, 11-year-old Adam, survived the attack and had to undergo multiple surgeries. The mother, pediatrician Alaa, who had just started her shift at the hospital at the time of the bombing, was unharmed. The children ranged in age from 7 months to 12 years.

== Background ==
According to the Gaza Health Ministry, Israeli forces have killed about 1,600 Gaza health workers since the start of the war until the end of May 2025. Israeli attacks on hospitals and health workers in the Gaza Strip are one of the elements cited by Amnesty International in concluding that Israel is committing genocide in Gaza. Additionally, the UN and local officials estimated that more than 16,000 children were killed and 34,000 wounded.

The Gaza Health Ministry counts 380 healthcare workers imprisoned during the Gaza war, including Dr. Hussam Abu Safiya. According to the Israeli NGO Physicians for Human Rights (PHR-I), Palestinian healthcare workers detained by Israel have reported torture and being targeted because of their profession. Four Palestinian doctors have been killed in Israeli custody since the start of the Gaza war, including surgeon Adnan al-Bursh, whose body the United Nations (UN) stated showed signs of torture.

Alaa Al-Najjar and Hamdi al-Najjar were doctors at Nasser Hospital in Khan Yunis, Gaza. Alaa worked there as a pediatrician for about 14 years. Six months before the strike she gave birth to her youngest child. She returned to work shortly thereafter due to the ongoing war and shortage of medical workers.

== Strike ==
On the morning of Friday, May 23, 2025, Alaa left her home for work. Minutes later, an Israeli airstrike hit their house, resulting in the deaths of nine of their ten children: Yahya, Rakan, Ruslan, Jubran, Eve, Revan, Saydeen, Luqman, and Sidra. The eldest was 12 years old, and the youngest was six months old. According to a relative, the family's home was hit by the Israeli Air Force (IAF) twice. After the first time, in which the missile failed to detonate, Hamdi rushed home to get his children out, following which the Israelis launched a second missile, causing the explosion.

Witnesses reported that the children's charred bodies recovered from the rubble had been burned to a crisp; an uncle who rushed to the scene shortly after the strike described seeing a blown-out skull and scattered bits of brain tissue. The children's bodies were in such poor condition that their mother was unable to identify them. Hamdi suffered multiple fractures throughout his body and damage to the brain; he died on June 1.

The couple's 11-year-old child, Adam, survived the strike and was taken to the hospital with serious injuries. His surgeon Graeme Groom said that his "left arm was just about hanging off, he was covered in fragment injuries and he had several substantial lacerations". He sustained burns and multiple fractures. An uncle requested assistance for Adam in the Italian newspaper La Repubblica. In June 2025, the Italian foreign ministry evacuated Adam, Alaa, and 5 relatives to Milan for treatment. Alaa stated that she hoped to start a new life in Italy. She called herself: "a woman whose children were killed, nearly all of them, when all I ever wanted was to protect them."

== Reactions ==
The massacre drew international attention and condemnation. The family’s story became emblematic of the suffering endured by Palestinian civilians and healthcare workers during the conflict. Additionally, it drew attention to the impact of the Gaza war on Palestinian children.

=== Israeli ===
The Israel Defense Forces (IDF) stated they had bombed a group of suspects moving near Israeli troops, adding that reports of civilian casualties were "under review". However, no other victims of the strike are known, and the children's uncle says the area was deserted at the time. Marwan al-Hams, director of field hospitals at the Gaza Health Ministry (GHM), told Le Monde that most likely the army knew very well who the house belonged to and who was in it at the time of the bombing. He said it appeared that the IDF "wanted to target the health care system itself, the last line of defense protecting the Palestinian people by saving lives."

The IDF stated that the family should have complied with an evacuation order for the area. According to Haaretz, the evacuation order had been issued a month and a half earlier. At the time, at least 80% of Gaza was controlled by Israel or under evacuation order.

On May 27, Israeli newspaper Haaretz reported that Israeli media was spreading misinformation about the attack, such as AI-generated photos of the children and doubt about whether the IDF carried out the attack. Haaretz stated that the purpose was "undermining the veracity of the incident". In September 2026, the Israeli newspaper Ynet criticized the Israeli government as failing to engage in public diplomacy over the incident, while the "Palestinian account" and images of the dead children were widely circulated in the media.

=== Palestinian ===
Hamas described the mass killing as a:

"Heinous crime [that] clearly expresses the sadistic nature of the occupation, and the level of the deep-rooted spirit of revenge that drives Netanyahu and his gang of murderers and human monsters."

The Palestinian Ministry of Health in the Israeli-occupied West Bank, said:

"This horrific crime is not an isolated incident, but part of a systematic targeting of medical personnel and institutions, aimed at breaking the will of those standing steadfast in Gaza."

Munir al-Boursh, Director-General of the Gaza Health Ministry (GHM), stated:

"This is the reality our medical staff in Gaza endure. Words fall short in describing the pain. In Gaza, it is not only healthcare workers who are targeted—Israel's aggression goes further, wiping out entire families."

=== International ===
- United Nations: Francesca Albanese, the UN Special Rapporteur for the occupied Palestinian territories, said it represents a "distinguishable sadistic pattern of the new phase of the genocide".
- Brazil: President Lula condemned the massacre as "shameful and cowardly".
- Italy: Foreign Minister Antonio Tajani offered to welcome Adam and his parents into the country. Italian authorities offered to evacuate the surviving child, Adam, for medical treatment, citing the lack of adequate care available in Gaza.

== See also ==
- Rafah paramedic massacre
- Outline of the Gaza war
- Timeline of the Israeli–Palestinian conflict in 2025
- Timeline of the Gaza war (16 May 2025 – 19 August 2025)
- Gaza genocide
- Israeli war crimes
  - Israeli war crimes in the Gaza war
