= Killing of health workers in the Gaza war =

Killings of medical and humanitarian personnel during the Gaza war

Many health workers have been killed during attacks on medical facilities and medical transport in the Gaza war. By July 2026, Israeli forces had killed more than 1,700 healthcare workers in Gaza. The Palestinian Central Bureau of Statistics reported that at least 1,701 health sector workers were killed between October 2023 and October 2025, not including at least five additional medical workers killed during 2026. The Euro-Mediterranean Human Rights Monitor verified that Israel had killed over 1,700 healthcare workers and detained hundreds more since the start of the war. By mid-2026, more than 80 percent of hospitals and healthcare institutions in Gaza had been rendered non-operational. According to a July 2026 United Nations humanitarian report, overall Palestinian fatalities since October 2023 exceeded 73,000, including more than 1,700 healthcare workers and 595 humanitarian aid workers.

Although deaths and injuries occurred among medical responders on both the Israeli and Palestinian sides, the vast majority of attacks were conducted by Israeli forces against Palestinian personnel. Throughout the conflict, the World Health Organization (WHO) documented hundreds of attacks on healthcare facilities, ambulances, and medical personnel, with the highest concentration in the Gaza Strip.

== Attacks on health workers in Palestine ==
Israeli forces killed at least 1,722 healthcare workers in Gaza by October 2025, averaging two fatalities per day. The World Health Organization (WHO) verified more than 449 attacks on healthcare in Gaza and the occupied West Bank since 7 October 2023, alongside 60 attacks on healthcare infrastructure within Israel. The casualties in Gaza encompassed physicians, nursing staff, paramedics, hospital administrators, and specialized supportive personnel.

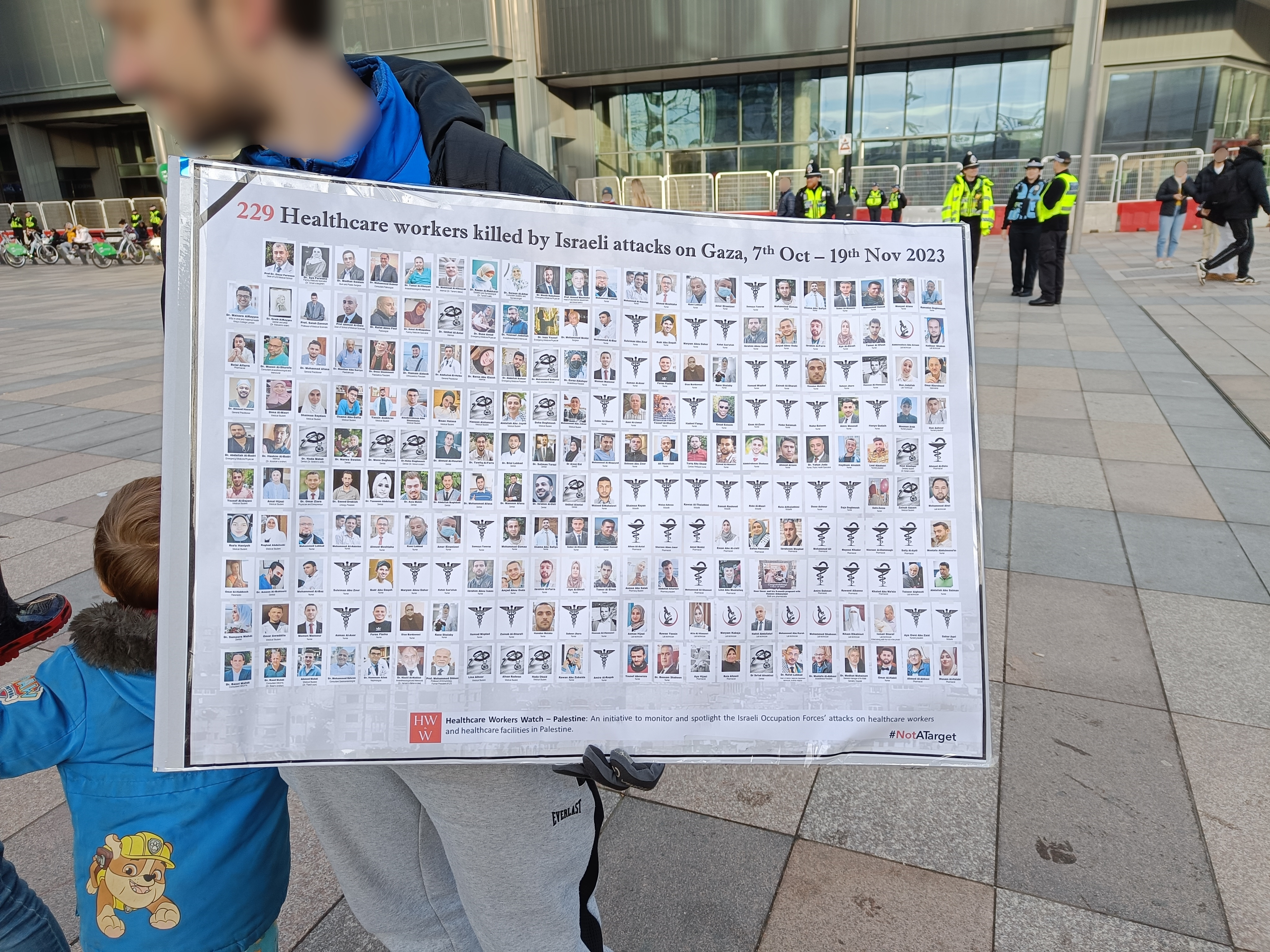
Photos of Palestinian healthcare workers killed in the Gaza war, 25 November 2023

On 8 October 2023, Israel killed at least six health workers during strikes on medical facilities and ambulances. By 15 October 2023, the confirmed number of health workers killed had risen to 28, spanning 30 recorded incidents of violence against health facilities, ambulances, and medical responders. By 16 November 2023, more than 200 health workers had been killed, dying inside hospitals, while operating ambulances, at active bombing sites, or within their private residences.

On 18 January 2024, Israel struck a residential compound housing Medical Aid for Palestinians staff and their family members, injuring several individuals. On 9 February 2024, the Gaza Health Ministry reported that the cumulative medical worker death toll had reached 340.

In early March 2024, Meinie Nicolai, a director at Doctors Without Borders (MSF), stated that Israel had killed two humanitarian aid workers without providing an official military justification. Reem Abu Lebdeh, a trustee on the UK board of MSF, was killed by an Israeli airstrike in Khan Younis during the same period.

By 26 March 2024, the Palestine Red Crescent Society (PRCS) reported that 15 of its staff members had been killed since the outbreak of war. By 1 June 2024, that total had risen to 33.

In July 2024, a Palestinian physician and his family were killed by an Israeli airstrike after complying with an Israeli military evacuation order. In September 2024, the Gaza Health Ministry released an identified list of 1,151 healthcare workers killed up to that date.

=== Hospital staff ===
On 14 October 2023, according to a statement by the Archbishop of Canterbury, Justin Welby, an Israeli rocket damaged the upper two floors of the Al-Ahli Arab Hospital's cancer treatment centre, which housed the ultrasound and mammography wards, injuring four staff members. Another explosion in the hospital's courtyard on 17 October led to an estimated death toll of about 471, according to the Gaza Health Ministry. The cause of the explosion is disputed; investigations by several mainstream news agencies suggested the blast was caused by an errant rocket fired from inside Gaza, though without reaching a definitive forensic consensus. Conversely, an independent visual investigation by Forensic Architecture published on 20 October 2023 concluded that the blast originated from a munition fired from Israel.

At al-Awda Hospital, staff reported that Israeli snipers opened fire on civilians outside the building, while a hospital monitoring manager stated that a staff nurse was fatally shot through a window on the building's fourth floor. On 3 February 2024, the Red Crescent buried three of its staff members following two weeks of repeated bombardments surrounding the Al-Amal Hospital. Another hospital physician in Deir el-Balah was killed by a strike on 22 February 2024.

By mid-2024, cumulative deaths among healthcare professionals in Gaza had surpassed the combined total of health worker fatalities documented across all other global conflicts during 2022, as well as in any single year since 2016. Furthermore, dozens of medical personnel were detained by Israeli forces, including Dr. Muhammad Abu Salmiya, director of Al-Shifa Hospital, who remained held without charges for seven months until his release in July 2024. In May 2024, Adnan al-Bursh, head of orthopaedics at Al-Shifa Hospital, died inside an Israeli prison following four months in military detention.

In October 2024, MSF condemned an Israeli airstrike that killed one of its healthcare staff alongside fourteen civilians. On 13 December 2024, Israeli tank fire killed Dr. Sayeed Joudeh, identified as the last practicing orthopaedic surgeon operating in northern Gaza.

Dr. Hussam Abu Safiya, director of Kamal Adwan Hospital, was detained by Israeli forces during hospital military operations in December 2024 and remained in custody as of July 2026. In July 2026, the UN Independent International Commission of Inquiry on the Occupied Palestinian Territory concluded that Israeli security forces had intentionally killed, detained, and mistreated medical personnel, characterizing the acts as war crimes of wilful killing and torture, alongside the crime against humanity of extermination. The Commission formally demanded Israel release Abu Safiya and all arbitrarily detained healthcare providers.

=== Paramedics and ambulance strikes ===
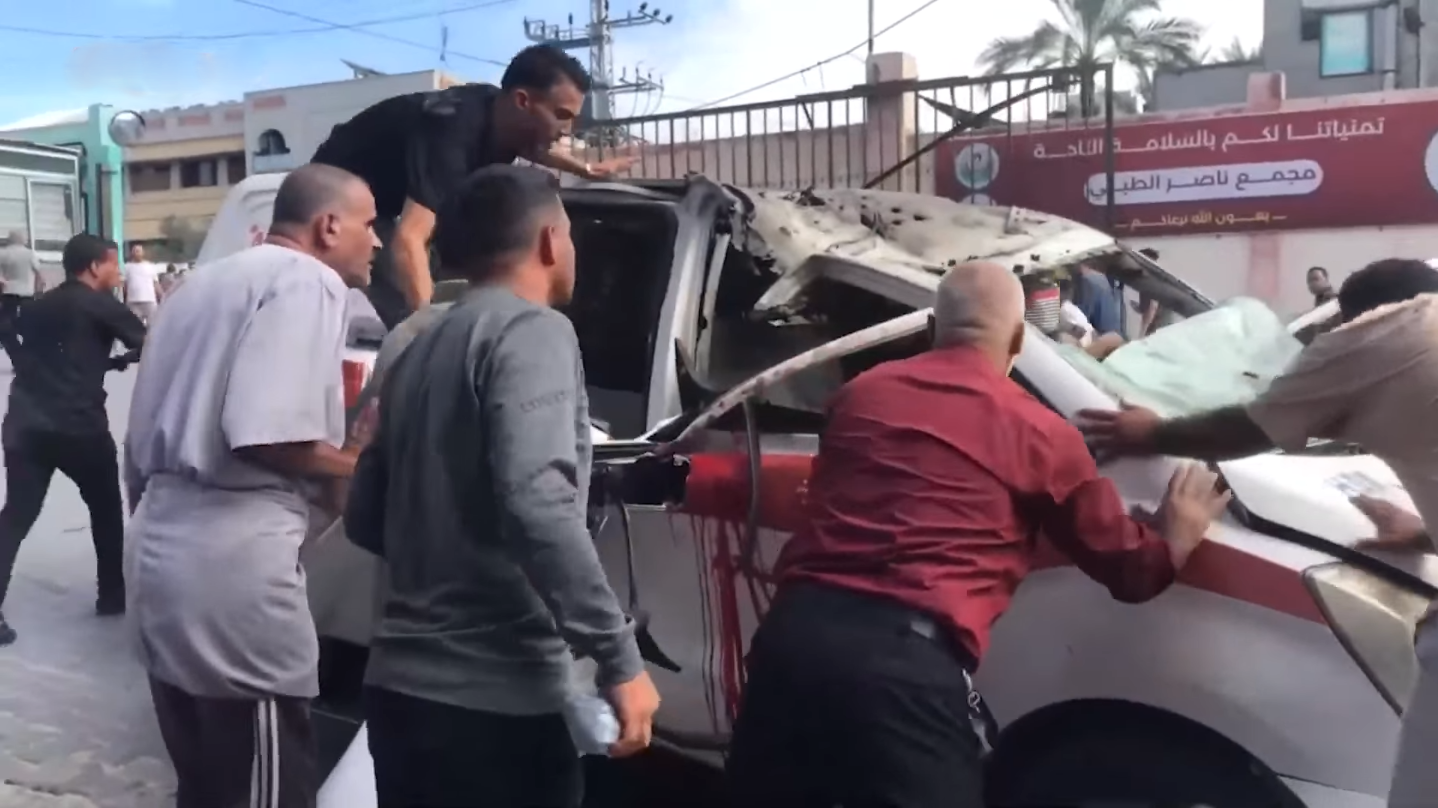
Palestine Red Crescent Society ambulance hit by an Israeli airstrike in Khan Yunis on 7 October 2023

On 7 October 2023, an ambulance departing the Nasser Medical Complex in Khan Younis was hit by an Israeli strike at approximately 14:00, injuring multiple paramedics, an attack subsequently documented by verified social media footage and Anadolu Agency reporting. On the same date, WHO recorded a separate strike in Jabalia targeting two ambulances, killing two paramedics. Gaza's Health Ministry confirmed that three ambulances overall were directly struck during the initial response, leaving ten paramedics injured.

On 18 November 2023, two people were killed while travelling in a marked MSF evacuation convoy in Gaza City. Shortly thereafter, PRCS reported that Israeli forces targeted an ambulance operating in northern Gaza, resulting in three fatalities.

On 7 February 2024, PRCS stated that gunfire in Gaza City killed one paramedic and wounded two others. On 10 February 2024, two PRCS paramedics dispatched to rescue six-year-old Hind Rajab were found dead inside their destroyed ambulance after losing communications on or around 29 January 2024. In response, the WHO released an institutional condemnation mourning paramedics Yusuf Zeino and Ahmed Al-Madhoun. Independent forensic investigations by media organizations and human rights monitors analyzing munition fragments and satellite imagery indicated that Israeli armor fired directly upon the rescue vehicle.

On 23 February 2024, an airstrike killed a PRCS paramedic in Rafah. In May 2024, PRCS documented another bombing that destroyed an operational ambulance in Rafah, killing two paramedics. In June 2024, an Israeli strike on a civil defence command installation killed three emergency rescue personnel.

In March 2025, Israeli troops killed 15 Palestinian medics and rescue personnel during pre-dawn military operations in the Tel al-Sultan district of Rafah, an event described by surviving eyewitnesses and UN observers as a massacre. The bodies—comprising eight PRCS responders, six Civil Defence rescue specialists, and a UN worker—were recovered from a mass grave alongside destroyed medical ambulances and a marked UN vehicle. Witnesses stated that several recovered bodies displayed evidence of binding and execution at close range. Although initial IDF accounts stated the operation targeted a militant named Mohammed Amin Shobaki, subsequent identifications confirmed no individual matching that identity among the deceased. In July 2026, an internal military inquiry conducted by the IDF concluded the deaths resulted from operational and "professional failures," resulting in the formal dismissal of the military unit's deputy commander.

In a separate strike on 25 July 2026, an Israeli strike killed an emergency medic responding to casualties within the Nuseirat refugee camp in the central Gaza Strip.

=== Israel's stated reasons for targeting medical facilities ===
Israeli officials state that military operations target hospitals and ambulances due to operational exploitation by armed groups deploying within them. Multiple legal scholars and human rights monitoring groups argue that Israeli forces frequently fail to provide independent evidentiary substantiation justifying the revocation of protected medical status.

The Palestinian human rights organization Al-Haq argues that systematic killings of healthcare professionals operate within a comprehensive military methodology designed to irreversibly dismantle healthcare capability across Gaza, correlating personnel fatalities with severe restrictions on humanitarian medical entry and structural interdictions against emergency patient evacuations.

=== Dual roles ===
Belated obituaries and lists published by Hamas and Palestinian Islamic Jihad have identified several killed healthcare workers as members or commanders in their military wings. A July 2026 report by the Times of Israel, verifying research compiled by independent researcher Salo Aizenberg, identified at least 18 instances where doctors, nurses, paramedics, and hospital employees were subsequently named in these notices.

== Attacks on health workers in Israel ==
Magen David Adom (MDA), Israel's national emergency medical service, reported that three employees were killed, four volunteers were injured, a treated patient was shot inside an operational ambulance, and nine emergency vehicles were destroyed by gunfire and arson during the initial 7 October 2023 attack. During the Be'eri massacre, the kibbutz dental clinic became the locus of a prolonged standoff between armed militants and security personnel. The clinic was subsequently breached by Hamas militants, resulting in the fatal shooting of all sheltering medical staff and injured patients.

Two doctors from the Soroka Medical Center in Beersheba were killed following the outbreak of the war in October 2023. Dr. Eitan Ne'eman, a pediatric intensive care physician and IDF reservist in the 7008th Battalion, was killed in battle near the Gaza border. Dr. Daniel Levy, an ENT resident living in Kibbutz Be'eri, was killed inside the kibbutz clinic while treating the wounded alongside the local emergency response team.

By February 2024, Israeli military medical reporting documented that approximately 230 Israeli frontline medevac teams had come under active enemy fire during tactical medical evacuation missions.

== Attacks on health workers in Lebanon ==
On 11 January 2024, IDF operations targeted a civilian rescue facility in the southern Lebanese village of Hanine, destroying an ambulance and killing two rescue workers affiliated with the Islamic Health Committee.

== Blockade and restrictions on medical supplies ==
In addition to direct structural kinetic strikes, humanitarian organizations documented systemic military prohibitions stopping medical equipment from entering the Gaza Strip. CNN reporting revealed arbitrary Israeli border prohibitions barring entry of "anesthetics and anesthesia machines, oxygen cylinders, ventilators and water filtration systems," alongside specialized oncological therapeutics and basic surgical supplies.

Dr. Hussam Abu Safiya, director of Kamal Adwan Hospital, documented that WHO ambulance convoys were routinely subjected to invasive tactical checkpoint searches and prohibited from transporting full functional complements of trauma life support into northern combat zones. The Israel Defense Forces rejected assertions of willful medical interdiction, stating in media interviews that specialized operations directly facilitate incubator transfers, infant nutrition deliveries, and trauma medical supplies even during active tactical engagements inside hospital zones.

In February 2024, Amnesty International assessed that Israeli logistical restrictions violated preliminary provisional measures ordered by the International Court of Justice, calling on military authorities to immediately facilitate unimpeded passage of life-saving medical supplies.

== Impact on healthcare infrastructure ==
The war caused extensive structural degradation across Gaza's medical landscape. By July 2026, more than 80 percent of hospitals and clinical health institutions had been rendered non-operational. Doctors Without Borders (MSF) reported that approximately 90 percent of the aggregate health infrastructure across the Gaza Strip had been completely destroyed or structurally incapacitated.

WHO Director-General Tedros Adhanom Ghebreyesus noted that merely a third of clinical installations across the territory "remain even partially functional." WHO tracking recorded 22 dedicated structural attacks against operational healthcare facilities within the initial six months of 2026, accelerating clinical disruptions. Severe deficits in basic wound dressings and anesthesia equipment remained the principal operational bottleneck affecting residual trauma capability.

Furthermore, MSF confirmed it had been logistically prevented from bringing any new medical supply convoys or replacement international clinical staff into Gaza since 1 January 2026, coincident with the formal administrative expiration of its operational registrations.

== Attacks on international humanitarian workers ==
=== United Nations workers ===
The conflict became the deadliest operational environment in the history of the United Nations, with at least 88 staff members working for UNRWA, the primary relief agency for Palestinian refugees, killed within the initial five weeks. UNRWA maintained approximately 13,000 workers in Gaza prior to hostilities; fatalities comprised educators, school administrators, clinical nurses, a gynaecologist, structural engineers, operational support staff, and a trauma psychologist, many killed alongside immediate dependents during residential bombardment. The UNRWA worker death toll subsequently advanced to 136 in late December 2023, reaching 171 by 25 March 2024, and 182 by 30 April 2024. In mid-July 2026, UN humanitarian reporting noted that an additional six UNRWA operations staffers were killed across the territory during a single 24-hour period of intense bombardment.

=== Independent NGOs and World Central Kitchen airstrikes ===
Independent non-governmental organizations repeatedly experienced frontline staff fatalities and operational suspensions. Since October 2023, 15 international and regional staff colleagues working for Doctors Without Borders (MSF) were killed during military strikes.

On 1 April 2024, three clearly marked logistics vehicles operated by the relief charity World Central Kitchen (WCK) were destroyed by Israeli munition drone strikes in central Gaza, killing all seven aid workers aboard. The casualties comprised citizens of Australia, Poland, the United Kingdom, a dual citizen of the United States and Canada, and a Palestinian driver. Spanish‑Australian chef José Andrés, founder of WCK, publicly argued that the humanitarian convoy had been systematically targeted despite coordinated route deconfliction. WCK immediately suspended regional relief food deliveries following the attack.

Spanish Prime Minister Pedro Sánchez formally called on Israel on 2 April to deliver a fully transparent investigation into the strike sequence, noting the personnel operated exclusively under humanitarian neutrality. Australian Prime Minister Anthony Albanese characterized initial Israeli operational explanations as "not good enough." On 2 April, Israeli Prime Minister Benjamin Netanyahu acknowledged IDF responsibility for the deaths, describing the incident as an unintended operational misidentification and stating: "Such incidents occur during times of conflict."

By mid-2024, United Nations verification tracking confirmed that approximately 200 humanitarian relief professionals had lost their lives in Gaza since the beginning of hostilities.

== Casualties ==
Event	Total	Civilians		Children	
Event	Total	Total	%	Total	%
October 7 attacks	1,195	828	69.2% (Note: Calculated from referenced table data (828/1,195).)	36	3.01% (Note: Calculated from referenced table data (36/1,195).)
Israeli invasion and bombing of Gaza	74,370	~59,496 (Note: Calculated from referenced table data (80% of 74,370).)	~80%	21,976	29.55% (Note: Calculated from referenced table data (21,976/74,370).)
Israeli attacks in the West Bank	1,216			254	20.89% (Note: Calculated from referenced table data (254/1,216).)

As of 9 October 2026, at least 77,632 people (75,586+ Palestinians (Note: Calculated from referenced table data (74,370+1,216).) and 2,046+ Israelis) have been reported killed in the Gaza war (in all of Israel-Palestine) according to the Gaza Health Ministry (GHM) and Israeli Ministry of Foreign Affairs, including 270 journalists and media workers, 120 academics, and over 560 humanitarian aid workers, a number that includes 393 employees of UNRWA. A study by OHCHR found that 70% of the Palestinians killed in residential buildings or similar housing were women and children.

A February 2025 analysis of deaths in Gaza between October 2023 and 30 June 2024 concluded that trauma-related deaths were undercounted by the GHM by 41% during this period. It estimated that there had been 64,260 deaths from traumatic injury by June 2024, likely exceeding 70,000 by October 2024, with 59.1% of them being women, children and the elderly. The findings do not include non-trauma-related deaths. A comparable estimate up to May 2025 would be 93,000 (77,000 to 109,000), representing 4–5% of Gaza's pre-war population. Another casualty analysis published in February 2026 estimated 75,200 violent deaths up to 5 January 2025 – 34.7% higher than the GHM's casualty count at the time, and 56.2% women, children, and elderly individuals. The analysis estimated 8,540 excess non-violent deaths. An October 2025 analysis estimated 78,318 violent deaths (70,614 to 87,504) up to 31 December 2024, with a comparable estimate of between 100,000 and 126,000 violent deaths by November 2025.

A May 2025 investigation found that a classified IDF database listed 8,900 Palestinian fighters as dead or likely dead, or 17% of the 53,000 death toll at the time, which if correct would indicate that 83% of the dead were civilians—among conflicts since 1989, only the Srebrenica massacre (though not the Bosnian war overall), the siege of Mariupol, and the Rwandan genocide have seen a higher rate of civilian casualties. In response, the IDF said that the numbers in the article are incorrect.

A survey by the Palestinian Center for Policy and Survey Research (PCPSR) reported showed over 60% of Gazans have lost family members since the war began. Thousands of more dead bodies are thought to be under the rubble of destroyed buildings. The number of injured is greater than 100,000; United Nations agencies have reported that Gaza is now home to the highest number of child amputees per capita in the world.

The majority of casualties have been in the Gaza Strip. The GHM total casualty count does not distinguish Palestinian deaths by Israeli attacks from those by other means, like friendly fire, and describes all casualties as victims of "Israeli aggression". On 3 March 2026, the GHM published the names, gender and birth date of 72,004 individual Palestinians whose identities were confirmed and continues to attempt to identify all casualties.

The October 7 attacks on Israel killed 1,195 people, including 815 civilians. Casualties have also occurred in other parts of Israel, as well as in southern Lebanon, Syria, Yemen, and Iran. As reported by the Defense Ministry, the total number of Israeli fatalities as of October 2025 is 1,152. This figure encompasses soldiers, police personnel, Shin Bet operatives, and civilian security officials who died on duty, as well as those who succumbed to accidents, illness, or suicide. Notably, around 42% of the deceased were individuals under the age of 21. According to the Israeli Ministry of Defense's Rehabilitation Division, about 1,000 soldiers are wounded every month. In August 2024, the ministry predicted that it would have to account for 100,000 disabled IDF veterans by 2030 due to the war. An August 2025 report indicated that the rise in suicides among IDF soldiers was due to psychological trauma resulting from the prolonged conflict.

== International reactions ==
=== International Court of Justice filing ===
In December 2023, the Republic of South Africa instituted proceedings against Israel at the International Court of Justice (ICJ), alleging acts constituting violations of the Genocide Convention in Gaza. In its supportive documentary submission, South Africa highlighted systematic military attacks against clinical healthcare infrastructure, ambulances, and the killing of operational medical personnel as intentional conduct designed to render general conditions of life unsustainable across the territory.

=== Institutional warnings and advocacy ===
International humanitarian leaders and human rights bodies repeatedly condemned the degradation of medical protection. In July 2026, WHO Director-General Tedros Adhanom Ghebreyesus stated that the ongoing tactical environment imposed a "catastrophic" crisis on residual health systems, noting medical responders faced an "impossible" triage job within collapsing infrastructure. MSF issued supportive institutional warnings documenting that despite diplomatic assertions of ceasefire implementations since October 2025, kinetic strikes persistently inflicted medical casualties, recording at least 733 fatalities and 1,913 traumatic injuries during that timeframe.

In early July 2026, UN Special Procedures rights experts publicly called on Israeli authorities to release Dr. Hussam Abu Safiya and all arbitrarily detained medical personnel, arguing that indefinite military detentions of administrative hospital directors functioned as an intentional destabilization of Palestinian clinical leadership.

=== Protests by medical professionals and civil society ===
Throughout the conflict, international medical workers and human rights advocacy networks conducted solidarity demonstrations protesting the killings and detentions of frontline healthcare responders:

- On 10 November 2023, hundreds of British healthcare workers gathered outside Downing Street in London holding silent vigils to memorialize over 200 Palestinian medical professionals killed up to that date, presenting petitional demands to Prime Minister Rishi Sunak urging an immediate humanitarian ceasefire.
- In December 2023, advocacy coalitions affiliated with Healthcare Workers for Palestine staged public readings of deceased Gazan doctors and nurses outside the Art Institute of Chicago, while Pakistani medical staff conducted a synchronized "White Coat March" through Karachi demanding academic and military protection for clinical facilities.
- In July 2026, international medical trade unions and rights activists renewed demonstration campaigns focusing specifically on detained medical staff. On 16 July 2026, French clinical workers and civil activists congregated outside the French Ministry of Foreign Affairs in Paris chanting slogans demanding diplomatic intervention to secure the release of Dr. Hussam Abu Safiya and 84 identified medical staff incarcerated within Israeli detention facilities. During the same week, demonstrators in Stockholm, Sweden, staged theatrical architectural protests emphasizing the degradation of clinical protections and calling for international monitoring inside Israeli military detention centers holding healthcare personnel.

== Investigations by Israel ==
On 19 August 2026, the Israeli Government announced that it was launching criminal investigation into the case of 15 rescue workers killed in a convoy Rafah in March 2025 as well as into the death of Hind Rajab in Gaza City in January 2024, but closed the cases of two separate killings of Doctors Without Borders employees as well as the World Central Kitchen aid convoy attack, in which seven workers were killed. The decisions are made by the Military Advocate General, the top legal body of the IDF, after cases are referred to them by the General Staff Fact-Finding Assessment Mechanism, "an independent military body responsible for investigating unusual incidents amid the war".
