= We Feed People =

2022 documentary film by Ron Howard

- Theatrical release poster
- Directed by: Ron Howard
- Produced by: Brian Grazer; Ron Howard; Sara Bernstein; Justin Wilkes; Meredith Kaulfers; Walter Matteson
- Cinematography: Kris Kaczor; Sebastian Lindstrom; Alicia Sully
- Edited by: Andrew Morreale; Gladys Murphy
- Music by: Sami Jano
- Production company: Imagine Documentaries
- Distributed by: National Geographic Documentary Films; Disney+; Hulu; National Geographic Channel
- Release dates: March 19, 2022 (United States); May 19, 2022 (Canada)
- Running time: 89 minutes
- Country: United States
- Language: English

We Feed People is a 2022 American documentary film directed by Ron Howard that chronicles how chef José Andrés and his nonprofit World Central Kitchen (WCK) rebuild nations in the wake of disaster, providing food to those affected. It had its world premiere in Austin, Texas, at the SXSW Film Festival and was released on March 19, 2022, in the U.S. and in Canada on May 19, 2022, by National Geographic Documentary Films. The film received critical acclaim and was nominated for two Primetime Emmy Awards at the 74th Emmy Awards.

== Backstory ==
In a conversation about the collaboration process with Emmy-nominated directors of photography Kris Kaczor, enlisted by film director Ron Howard for the film, and Sebastian Lindstrom and Alicia Sully, who for nearly twelve years had already been filming World Central Kitchen, it was clearly noted that Andrés did not want to be the focus of attention for the film. According to Lindstrom, "It's not about José, but it is about José," and had the director said that to Andrés, it would have been "No way—I don't want this to be about me." There was only one sit-down interview with Andrés, as he was resistant to being on camera and at first having a microphone attached to him.

== Synopsis ==
We Feed People is a fast-paced documentary film that follows chef José Andrés, who rushes from one disaster to another, always with the same humanitarian goal—to feed people in need. The film begins with disaster footage from Hurricane Florence in the Carolinas in 2018. Then, while vacationing in the Cayman Islands, a massive earthquake strikes Haiti, where Andrés rushes with a small team.

The film features archive footage from the 2017 disaster in Puerto Rico after Hurricane Maria, along with clips of President Trump, one of whom is doing his infamous tossing of paper towels while Andrés and his team are on the ground working to the point of physical and mental exhaustion. From further back in the archives, President Clinton is shown giving Andrés a shout-out after signing the Bill Emerson Good Samaritan Act of 1996, which shields food donors from civil and criminal liability. Additional archive footage features President Biden, Craig Fergusson, David Letterman, and uncredited footage from Ferran Adrià, Bobby Flay, Martha Stewart, and Melania Trump.

For each disaster, we see Andrés and members of the NGO World Central Kitchen map the affected area and find a suitable place to build that important first kitchen to cook familiar food for the local residents. We often see Andrés attempting to enlist the aid of established organizations like the Red Cross and FEMA while his team is busy with the logistics of getting the food to the disaster area. Then, with military precision, the Chef Relief Team begins the process of branching out to set up other kitchens and dispatching to provide thousands of meals. The film also depicts the close personal relationships Andrés shares with WCK leaders like Sam Bloch.

The film also offers a personal look at Andrés, from his humble beginnings to his culinary success first in Spain and then in the United States, and at home with his supportive wife and three daughters.

== Production ==
On April 16, 2020, National Geographic Documentary Films announced at the Sundance Film Festival that its next feature project would be from director Ron Howard and producer Brian Grazer, founders of the production company Imagine Documentaries. It was also announced that joining them were Sara Bernstein and Justin Wilkes as producers, Michael Rosenberg and Louisa Velis as executive producers, as well as Nate Mook and Richard Wolfe from World Food Kitchen and Carolyn Bernstein and Ryan Harrington from National Geographic Documentary Films.

In an interview with producer Sara Bernstein, tapping into the nearly one thousand hours of footage already filmed by World Central Kitchen was critical due to the restraints placed on the film's production during the COVID-19 pandemic.

== Release ==
We Feed People had its world premiere in Austin, Texas, at the SXSW Film Festival, and was released in select theaters throughout the U.S., including the SVA Theater in Manhattan, New York, on May 3, 2022, where many dignitaries, including Hillary Clinton with her daughter Chelsea Clinton, actors Drew Barrymore, Richard Gere, Steve Buscemi, and Liev Schreiber, and comedian Stephen Colbert attended. Celebrity chefs Rachael Ray and Eric Ripert also attended the screening, which was followed by a conversation moderated by Padma Lakshmi, host of the American television series Top Chef.

The film began streaming on Disney+ on May 27, 2022. On June 16, 2022, National Geographic Documentary Films announced that the film would begin streaming on Hulu and that on the following evening it would receive a special screening on the National Geographic Channel.

== Reception ==
=== Critical response ===
We Feed People was generally well received by critics. In The Wall Street Journal, John Anderson writes, "Alternately inspiring and dismaying, the movie is also informative, engaging and reads like an application for the Nobel Peace Prize." Glenn Kenny, critic for the film review website RogerEbert.com noted that "It's refreshing to see an account of a famous food guy who doesn't wallow in his own character defects." For The Hollywood Reporter, Dan Fienberg added that "It captures enough of the methodology behind Andrés’ trajectory to be consistently interesting and it's pragmatic enough not to be exclusively worshipful."

On the review aggregator website Rotten Tomatoes, 100% of 28 critics' reviews are positive, with an average rating of 7.70/10. The website's consensus reads: "The soul-stirring We Feed People pays tribute to a public figure who stands as a powerful example of how one person can help make a difference." Metacritic, which uses a weighted average, assigned the film a score of 77 out of 100, based on 8 critics, indicating "generally favorable" reviews.

=== Accolades ===
We Feed People was nominated for two Primetime Emmy Awards at the 74th Emmy Awards, and at the 2022 Sun Valley Film Festival in Idaho, Ron Howard won the audience award for Best Feature Film.

Award	Date of ceremony	Category	Recipient	Result	Ref.
Cleveland International Film Festival	March 30 – April 9, 2022	Best Documentary	Ron Howard	Nominated	
Primetime Emmy Awards	July 12, 2022	Outstanding Cinematography For A Nonfiction Program	We Feed People	Nominated	
Primetime Emmy Awards	July 12, 2022	Outstanding Documentary Or Nonfiction Special	We Feed People	Nominated	
Sun Valley Film Festival	March 30 – April 3, 2022	Best Feature Film	Ron Howard	Won	
SXSW Film Festival	March 11 – 20, 2022	Documentary Spotlight	Ron Howard	Nominated	

== See also ==
- World Central Kitchen – Not-for-profit NGO providing disaster food aid
