= Graeme Groom =

British surgeon

Graeme Groom CMG FRCS
- Born: Alan Frederick Graeme Groom; 1953 or 1954 (age 72–73)
- Education: St. Catharine's College, Cambridge
- Occupation: orthopedic surgeon
- Employer(s): King's College Hospital, London, United Kingdom
- Known for: volunteering in Gaza
- Military service
- Service years: 1974-1993
- Rank: Lieutenant colonel
- Unit: Royal Army Medical Corps

Alan Frederick Graeme Groom (born 1953 or 1954) is a British orthopedic surgeon and limb reconstruction expert at King's College Hospital in London. He has traveled to Gaza on medical missions more than 40 times. For his humanitarian work, he was named a Companion of the Order of St Michael and St George (CMG) in 2024.

== Background ==
Alan Frederick Graeme Groom was born in 1953 or 1954. He is half-Irish. He is an alumnus of St. Catharine's College, Cambridge. In 1971 and 1972, Groom assisted in two censuses of mountain gorillas in the Virunga Mountains in central-east Africa. The project was supervised by Dian Fossey and received funding from the National Geographic Society.

While serving in the British army, Groom became a doctor. After approximately 19 years, he retired from the Royal Army Medical Corps in 1993 with the rank of lieutenant colonel. An orthopaedic surgeon, he specializes in limb reconstruction and trauma surgery and works for the National Health Service at King's College Hospital in London. He is a Fellow of the Royal Colleges of Surgeons. According to Groom, he has worked in 14 conflict zones across the course of his career.

== Volunteer work in Gaza ==
Groom is the co-chair of Ideals (the International Disaster & Emergency Aid with Long-term Support), a medical charity that has worked in Gaza since 2009. He has visited Gaza on more than 40 medical missions. He is also affiliated with Islamic Help UK.

While working in Gaza in 2009, Groom met the Palestinian orthopaedic surgeon Adnan al-Bursh. With Groom's assistance, al-Bursh obtained a 6 month fellowship at King's College Hospital in 2013. Al-Bursh died in Israeli custody in 2024, allegedly from torture, and Groom eulogized him in BMJ.

After the 2014 Gaza war, Groom was part of a medical team of surgeons that made monthly trips to Gaza to treat patients, bring medical supplies, and train healthcare workers. Between August 2014 and February 2015, they treated at least 180 patients and performed at least 50 surgeries. He expressed shock at how many of the injured patients were children. Because of the lack of appropriate surgical supplies, the team brought $775,000 worth of equipment funded by the British government.

Groom volunteered at Al-Shifa Hospital during the 2018–2019 Gaza border protests when thousands of Palestinians were shot by the Israel Defense Forces, primarily in their legs. Groom compared the shootings to Bloody Sunday and stated that "Whole limbs are usually ripped to shreds".

=== Gaza war ===
During the Gaza war, Groom has travelled to Gaza four times. In April 2024, he worked at the European Hospital in Khan Younis, at that time one of the few functioning hospitals in Gaza. He spoke to the BBC about refugees living on hospital grounds having to move their tents to make space for additional graves. From 6 August to 3 September 2024, Groom worked at Nasser Hospital in Khan Younis. After his return he and another Ideals volunteer published a column in The Times describing the humanitarian crisis in Gaza.

During his 13 May to 4 June 2025 visit, Groom and his fellow volunteers were prohibited by Israel from bringing medical supplies into Gaza, because Israel said they could be used for military purposes. This included scalpels, staples, and circular external fixators which help prevent infections and amputations. On previous trips, they had been able to transport 25 suitcases of supplies into Gaza. Groom treated around 20 patients per day at Nasser Hospital, a third of whom were children. He has described operating on a "conveyor belt" of wounded children and working all day on "mutilated bodies and mangled limbs". He also observed daily cases of severe malnutrition in children. Treating patients was hindered by widespread malnutrition and infections, shortages of staff and essential medical supplies, and other obstacles. During that visit, Groom treated Adam al-Najjar, the 11-year-old son of two doctors employed by the hospital. Al-Najjar was seriously wounded in an Israeli airstrike that killed his father and 9 siblings. Groom and his colleagues operated on al-Najjar and saved his arm from amputation. Groom also treated a 7 year old child with multiple fractures who cried for his deceased mother.

In June and July, Groom spoke to the media about extreme shortages of food and medical supplies and treating civilians who were shot at aid distribution sites run by the Gaza Humanitarian Foundation. In his opinion, the situation in Gaza is much worse than all other conflicts he has witnessed. He told NPR: "the current campaign is directed almost exclusively at the blameless and the defenseless, and the killing must stop."

Groom has spoken about his experiences in Gaza to government officials in Belgium, France, and Germany and expressed disappointment at the lack of concrete action. Groom has been denied entry to Gaza three times by the Israeli government without explanation, including once in late 2025. He believes that it is because he has spoken publicly about what he observed in Gaza. Other healthcare workers have also been refused entry, and a legal petition arguing that these denials are illegal has been submitted to the Supreme Court of Israel.

== Recognition ==
In December 2024, Groom was recognized in the 2025 New Year Honours list. He was named Companion of the Order of St Michael and St George (CMG) "For services to International Disaster and Emergency Aid". The British Orthopaedic Association made him a 2025 Honorary Fellow.

== Writing ==
- Rose, Victoria; Groom, Graeme (2024-09-14). "The economics of Gaza: £12 for a cigarette, £3,000 for a donkey". The Times. Retrieved 2026-11-03.
- Groom AFG, Coull JT. Army Amputees from the Falklands—Review. BMJ Military Health 1984;130:114-116.
- Groom, A. F. G. (1973). “Squeezing out the Mountain Gorillas.” Oryx 12: 207-215.
- Harcourt, A. H.; Groom, A. F. G. (1972). "Gorilla Census". Oryx. 11 (5): 355–363. doi:10.1017/S0030605300010401.
