= World Central Kitchen =

Not-for-profit NGO providing disaster food aid

- Abbreviation: WCK
- Formation: 2010
- Founder: José Andrés
- Type: Not-for-profit non-governmental organization
- Purpose: Food security
- Headquarters: Washington, DC, United States
- Region served: Worldwide
- Website: wck.org

World Central Kitchen (WCK) is a not-for-profit, non-governmental organization that provides food relief. It was founded in 2010 by Spanish American chef and restaurateur José Andrés following the earthquake in Haiti, and has subsequently responded to Hurricane Harvey, the 2018 lower Puna eruption, 2023 Turkey–Syria earthquakes, the ongoing Gaza humanitarian crisis, and the 2025 Los Angeles wildfires.

The organization has suffered casualties in areas of armed conflict, including two WCK volunteers in July 2022, one volunteer in Kharkiv in June 2023, and four Ukrainian WCK volunteers in July 2023 in Orikhiv during the Russian invasion of Ukraine, and eleven aid workers during the Israeli invasion of the Gaza Strip—seven in the April 2024 aid convoy attack, three in November 2024 and one in March 2025.

== Work ==
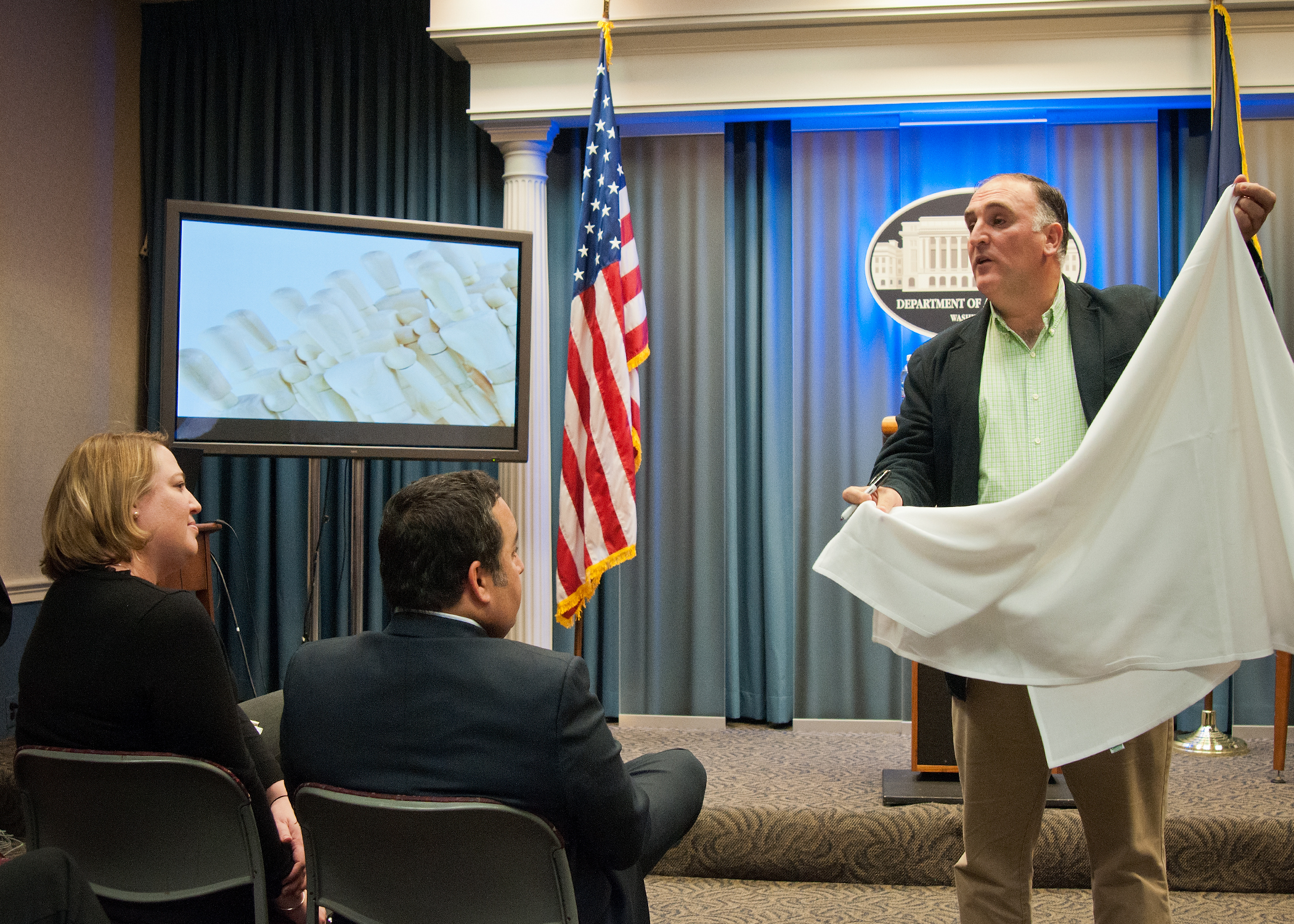
Chef José Andrés with White House liaison staff

The NGO has contributed to the provision of meals in Australia, the Bahamas, the Dominican Republic, Egypt, Israel, Lebanon, Puerto Rico, Ukraine, the United States, Turkey, Syria, and Palestine. It has also operated culinary training programs in Cambodia, the Dominican Republic, Nicaragua, Zambia and Peru.

=== Natural disasters ===
- 2010, Haiti – Following the 2010 earthquake, WCK established local kitchens and began distributing food. They returned to Haiti in the ensuing years, helping set up a culinary school in 2015.
- August 2017, United States – WCK coordinated efforts with the American Red Cross and working in Houston, Texas, following Hurricane Harvey.
- September 2017, Puerto Rico – WCK led some of the disaster relief efforts in the wake of Hurricane Maria, organizing a grass-roots movement of chefs and volunteers to establish communications, food supplies, and other resources and started serving meals. The group's efforts to provide assistance encountered obstacles from FEMA and government bureaucrats, but as Andrés said, "we just started cooking." WCK served more than two million meals in the first month after the hurricane. It received two short term FEMA contracts and served more meals than the Salvation Army or the Red Cross, but its application for longer-term support was denied. WCK developed resiliency centers on the island, and installed a hydropanel array at a greenhouse in San Juan to provide safe drinking water.
- December 2017, United States – WCK operated in Southern California in Ventura County during the December 2017 Thomas Fire to assist firefighters and first responders and provided food to families affected by the fires.
- June, 2018 United States – WCK set up a kitchen to serve the Hawaiian communities affected by the 2018 lower Puna eruption.
- September 2018, United States – WCK worked in South Carolina in the aftermath of Hurricane Florence.
- November 2018, United States – WCK and Andrés teamed up with chefs Guy Fieri, and Tyler Florence, and local Sierra Nevada Brewing Company to bring Thanksgiving dinner to 15,000 Camp Fire survivors in Butte County, California.
- September 2019, Bahamas – WCK and Andrés opened kitchens in The Bahamas to feed people in the wake of Hurricane Dorian.
- In October 2019, United States – WCK helped in Sonoma County, California, working with local chefs such as Guy Fieri, during the Kincade Fire.
- January 2020, Australia – During the 2019–2020 bushfire season, WCK deployed in January to rural locations in New South Wales. Meals were delivered to firefighters and residents. A food voucher program reimbursing restaurants for meals was trialled by WCK in Mallacoota, Victoria.
- March 2020, United States – The Grand Princess cruise ship was under quarantine near San Francisco due to the COVID-19 pandemic. WCK in collaboration with Bon Appetit Management Company (a division of Compass Group), fed thousands of stranded passengers for approximately a week while logistics were being figured out. Over 50,000 meals were served during this crisis.
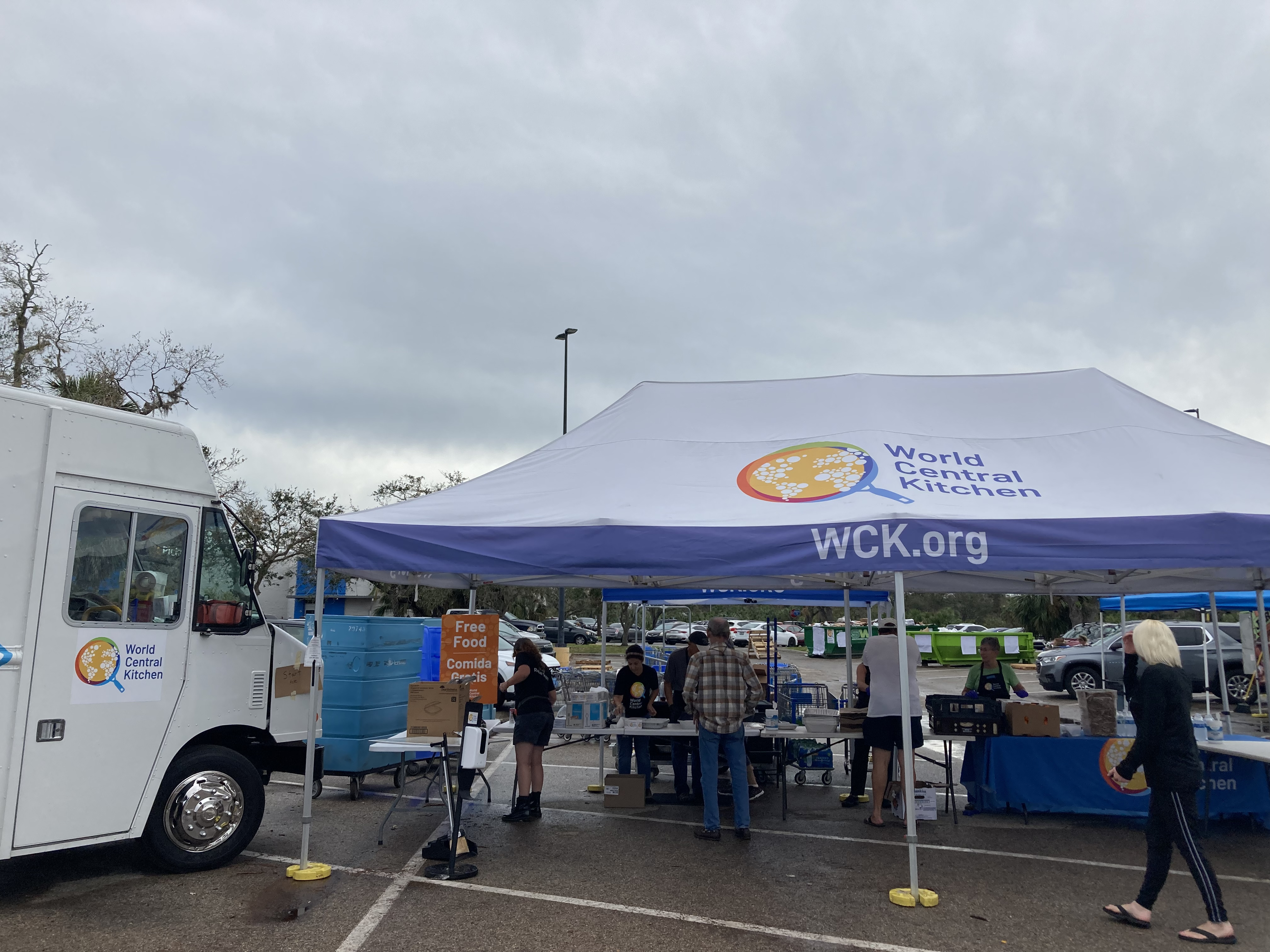
  World Central Kitchen deployed in Port Charlotte, Florida, after Hurricane Ian
- February 2023, Turkey, Syria – WCK set up mobile kitchens throughout Turkey and Syria following the 2023 Turkey–Syria earthquake.
- July 2023, United States – WCK set up a short-term kitchen in Montpelier, Vermont following the Great Vermont Flood, providing meals to clean-up volunteers and displaced residents.
- August 2023, United States – WCK set up kitchens in Maui in relief of those in Lahaina and West Maui who lost family members, businesses and homes. They provided 6000-6300 meals per day with the help of volunteers.
- January 2025, United States – WCK activated its Chef Corps following the Southern California wildfires, with chefs including Mary Sue Milliken, Susan Feniger, Evan Funke, Roy Choi, and Tyler Florence working to feed first responders and community members.
- June 2026, Venezuela – WCK deployed a relief team to Caracas within hours of the earthquakes that struck Venezuela on 24 June 2026, activating a network of local restaurant partners built during earlier responses to Hurricanes Julia and Beryl. Founder José Andrés pledged $1 million toward the effort. By early July, WCK was serving thousands of meals daily across the states of Miranda, La Guaira, and Carabobo, and opened a large-capacity field kitchen near La Guaira on 2 July, working with 42 local restaurant partners and 64 distribution sites, with a target output of 30,000 meals per day.
- August 2026, Colombia – By the day after the 2026 Colombia earthquake, WCK had begun distributing food and water across several cities.

=== Domestic food insecurity ===
- In January 2019, WCK and Andrés opened a restaurant on Pennsylvania Ave, Washington, DC, to feed federal workers that were furloughed during the government shutdown.
- In mid-March 2020, Andrés transformed eight of his New York City and Washington, DC, restaurants into soup kitchens to support customers affected by the COVID-19 crisis.
- In late March 2020 in the San Francisco Bay Area, WCK collaborated with Frontline Foods in order to provide an open-sourced effort to deliver meals from local restaurants to local hospital staff, many of which have been negatively affected by the COVID-19 closures. It later assumed responsibility and management of the Frontline Foods operation.
- During April 2020, Andrés partnered with the Washington Nationals and World Central Kitchen to use the team's stadium in Washington, D.C. as a kitchen and distribution facility for free meals.

=== Armed conflict ===
==== Ukraine (2022–present) ====
In late February 2022, Andrés and World Central Kitchen responded to multiple locations, including in border areas and in conflict zones such as hard-hit Kharkiv, Ukraine, to distribute meals during the 2022 Russian invasion of Ukraine. By March 2, 2022, WCK had opened eight kitchens on the Poland–Ukraine border.

A local volunteer was killed in 2023 by a Russian missile strike on his apartment in Kharkiv.

==== Gaza (2023–present) ====
In response to the ongoing humanitarian crisis, World Central Kitchen has been contributing to food deliveries to the Gaza Strip. As of May 2025, it has provided more than 130 million meals.

World Central Kitchen has supplied food to airdrop operations by foreign states, as well as to the NGO Proactiva Open Arms performing maritime deliveries.

On 2 April 2024, WCK announced a pause to operations after Israeli airstrikes killed seven employees (see § Casualties).

===== Contribution to maritime corridor ("Operation Safeena") =====
In February 2024, Proactiva Open Arms announced that their Open Arms tugboat would conduct delivery to the Gaza Strip towing a barge of food and water provided by World Central Kitchen. The ship had been reportedly stationed in Cyprus since 16 February.

The president of Cyprus had proposed a maritime humanitarian corridor at a conference in Paris in early November, and held conversations the following month with the Egyptian president and Jordanian king. According to Cypriot authorities, there were also "technical discussions" with Israeli officials. In an interview with Tel Aviv Radio, the Israeli foreign minister said in December that "It can start immediately".

On 11 March, the ship was in Cyprus awaiting departure, after Cypriot authorities claimed that permission had been granted. The goods had reportedly been checked by Cypriot officials with Israeli oversight. It contained "nearly 200 tons of food".

The shipment arrived on 15 March at a beach south of Gaza City. According to WCK, this was the first boat to reach Gaza in nearly two decades.

=== Chef Corps ===
The Chef Corps is a global network of over 450 prominent culinary leaders partnered with World Central Kitchen.

Prominent chefs who participate in the World Central Kitchen Chef Corps include:

- Nyesha Arrington
- Roy Choi
- Giada De Laurentiis
- Mary Sue Milliken
- Susan Feniger
- Evan Funke
- Tyler Florence
- Michael Voltaggio
- Stephanie Izard

== Recognition ==
- For his work with WCK, José Andrés won the 2018 James Beard Foundation Award for Humanitarian of the Year.
- Recognizing his work with WCK, José Andrés was named one of the world's 100 most influential people by Time in 2018.
- For his work with WCK, José Andrés won the 2021 Princess of Asturias Award, in the category "Concord".
- For his work with WCK, José Andrés received a 2021 Courage and Civility Award from Jeff Bezos, along with a $100 million award.
- In 2024, José Andrés and the WCK were nominated for the Nobel Peace Prize by former House Speaker Nancy Pelosi, and representatives Jim McGovern and Rosa DeLauro.

== Casualties ==
=== Ukraine ===
On 25 July 2022, a Russian missile attack on a Chuihuiv community center killed two WCK volunteers. Sardor Hakimov, a 36-year-old Uzbek migrant to Ukraine, and another volunteer, only identified as Viktoria, were the victims. On 2 June 2023, a WCK volunteer in Kharkiv, a 60-year-old Ukrainian man identified as Igor, was killed as the result of a Russian missile strike on his apartment. On 10 July, four Ukrainian WCK volunteers identified as Tatyana, Iryna, Olga, and Vitaliy were killed in a Russian missile strike on a community center in Orikhiv.

=== 2024 Deir al-Balah airstrikes ===
On 1 April 2024, seven WCK employees – six people with foreign citizenship and a Palestinian driver – were killed in Deir al-Balah by a series of Israeli airstrikes. After the incident, WCK announced an immediate pause to operations in Gaza. The casualties included:

- Saif Abu Taha (Saifeddin Issam Ayad Abutaha), a 26-year-old Palestinian local from Rafah, he had worked as a driver for WCK since the start of the year. The BBC reported "He was happy to work with an organization that provides humanitarian aid to the displaced."
- Damian Soból, a 35-year-old Polish national from Przemyśl. Soból had worked with the WCK since 2022, engaging in relief efforts in Russian-invaded Ukraine. In February 2023, he traveled to earthquake-stricken Elbistan in Turkey with aid. In September 2023, he helped earthquake victims in Morocco. He then helped Gaza refugees in Egypt and then in Gaza itself.
- Lalzawmi "Zomi" Frankcom, a 43-year-old Australian national. Zomi also volunteered in Pakistan and Bangladesh during the 2022 floods and joined a convoy to the Haitian highlands delivering aid.
- James Henderson, a 33-year-old British national who had served in the Royal Marines and was working as a private security contractor with Solace Global.
- John Antony Chapman, a 57-year-old British national who had served in the Royal Marines and was a private security contractor with Solace Global.
- James Kirby, a 47-year-old British national. He was a former soldier, served tours in Bosnia and Afghanistan, and was a private security contractor with Solace Global.
- Jacob Flickenger, a 33-year-old dual Canadian-American citizen. He was a 11-year veteran of the Royal 22e Regiment of the Canadian Armed Forces and served in Afghanistan, where he was later diagnosed with PTSD. He is survived by his wife and son.

== See also ==
- We Feed People – 2022 documentary film by Ron Howard
- Sam Bloch – Humanitarian aid entrepreneur
