= Sam Bloch =

Humanitarian aid entrepreneur

Samuel S. Bloch
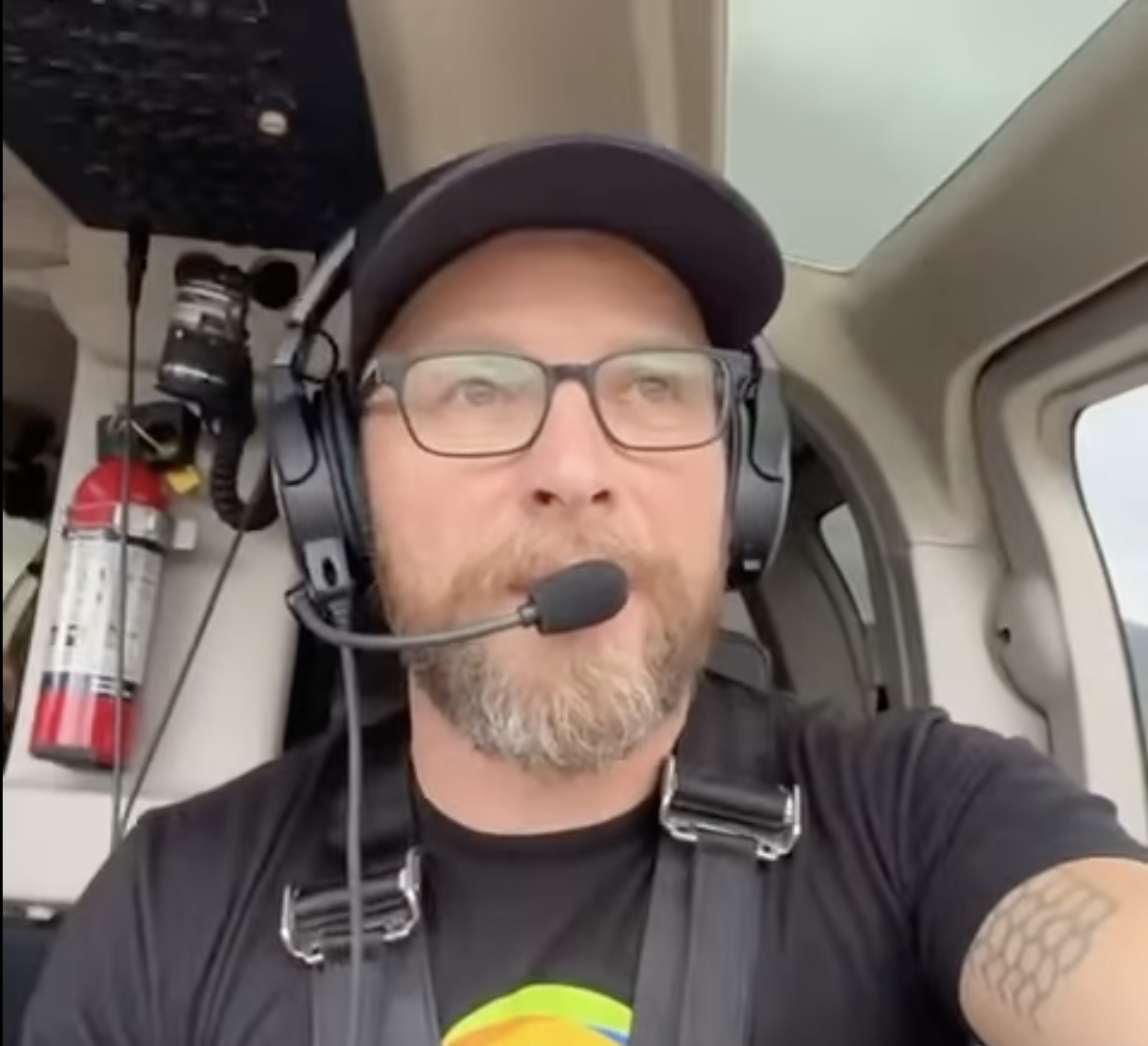
- Bloch delivering food via helicopter to remote areas affected by hurricanes Helene and Milton in the southern United States (2024)
- Born: January 1979 (age 47); New Jersey, United States of America
- Known for: Humanitarian aid; first response to natural disasters and conflict zones
- Sam Bloch's voice Bloch on his approach to humanitarian relief Recorded 2016

Samuel Steven Bloch (born January 1979) (pronunciation: Block or [blɑːk]) is an American humanitarian aid entrepreneur specializing in first response to natural disasters and conflict zones.

== Career ==
Bloch's career began in Thailand in response to the 2004 Indian Ocean earthquake and tsunami. Bloch went on to co-found Communitere International, first serving the 2010 Haiti earthquake and then expanding operations to The Philippines in 2013, Nepal in 2015, and Greece in 2017. Bloch and Communitere supported local businesses, participated in Maker Faire conventions, and aligned with the early efforts of Burners without Borders. In 2018, Bloch began as the director of emergency response with World Central Kitchen (WCK), focusing his efforts on hunger and food insecurity. Bloch has since been involved in relief for Cyclone Idai in Mozambique, Hurricane Dorian in The Bahamas, the 2020 Aegean Sea earthquake in Turkey, the 2023 Hawaii wildfires in Lāhainā, the Russian invasion of Ukraine via Poland, and the Gaza war in 2024. As of 2025, Bloch has stepped down from his position at WCK and serves on the advisory board of Watch Duty.

== Awards and appearances ==
Bloch has spoken at TEDx, Re:publica and other international conferences about the impact of resource center models in humanitarian relief. In 2017, Bloch won the Humanitarian STAR Award, in Disaster Relief and Recovery, from the Sierra Madre Rotary club. In 2022, Bloch's work was shown in documentary film We Feed People with the World Central Kitchen and chef José Andrés. In 2023, Bloch was interviewed by CNN's Christiane Amanpour while organizing relief in Morocco after the Al Haouz earthquake. In 2024, Bloch was interviewed to discuss addressing hunger on the Gaza Strip by CNN and The New York Times.
