= Adnan al-Bursh =

Palestinian orthopedic surgeon (1974–2024)

Adnan Al-Bursh
- Born: 17 September 1974; Jabalia, Gaza Strip
- Died: c. 19 April 2024 (aged 50); Ofer Prison, Israeli-occupied West Bank
- Cause of death: allegedly from torture in Israeli custody
- Occupation: Orthopedic surgeon

Adnan Al-Bursh (Arabic: عدنان البرش, romanized: ʿAdnān al-Bursh; 17 September 1974 – c. 19 April 2024) was a Palestinian orthopedic surgeon and the head of orthopedics at the Gaza Strip's largest medical facility, Al-Shifa Hospital. He died after four months of detention in Israeli prison during the Gaza war. During the Israeli invasion of the Gaza Strip, Al-Bursh was arrested by the Israeli military and held at Israel's Ofer Prison in the Israeli-occupied West Bank. Palestinian authorities and groups advocating for the rights of Palestinian prisoners said he had died as a result of being tortured.

== Early life and career ==
Adnan Al-Bursh was born in 1974 in Jabalia, the Israeli-occupied Gaza Strip, and received his early education there before traveling to Romania to study medicine. With the assistance of British orthopedic surgeon Graeme Groom, Al-Bursh obtained a 6 month fellowship at King's College Hospital in London. In his career, he was a prominent orthopedic surgeon and served as the head of orthopedics at Al-Shifa Hospital, Gaza's largest medical facility. Al-Bursh was married and had five children. He served as an adviser to the Palestine national football team.

In 2018, a viral photograph showed Al-Bursh in the Al-Shifa operating room covered in blood.

Shortly after the outbreak of the Gaza war in October 2023, Al-Bursh started living full-time at Al-Shifa, sleeping in the hospital's staff room at night. In November 2023, during the Israeli invasion of Gaza, Al-Bursh was stranded in the besieged Al-Shifa Hospital for 10 days with his nephew. Israeli forces later asked them to move south, but Al-Bursh refused to comply and instead moved north to assist at the Indonesia Hospital. Al-Bursh's wife and six children also refused to move south and sought refuge at one UNRWA school in the northern area of the strip.

On 20 November, Al-Bursh was injured when he was at work in the operating room of the Indonesian Hospital when Israeli tanks surrounded the hospital. Projectiles fired on the building killed at least 12 people and destroyed the hospitals' front entrance. The IDF denied that it was responsible for the attack. Following a truce, he relocated again in early December to Al-Awda Hospital, also in northern Gaza.

== Arrest and death ==
On 5 December 2023, the IDF surrounded Al-Awda Hospital in North Gaza where Al-Bursh was temporarily working. The hospital director told him that staff would have to leave the building. According to a doctor who worked with him there, the IDF would destroy the hospital if all the male workers did not exit. Israeli forces arrested the 50-year-old doctor alongside 10 other workers.

According to Israeli security sources, Al-Bursh was detained for national-security reasons; IDF sources reported that he was suspected of terrorism. According to Naji Abbas, Physicians for Human Rights Israel's prisoners' department director, medical professionals have been mass arrested and interrogated to 'fish' for information even if they are not suspected of participating in the militant activity. An IDF statement to Sky News confirmed that Al-Bursh was taken to Sde Teiman detention camp, which had been processing Palestinian prisoners since the start of the war and is the subject of multiple allegations of prisoner abuse. According to Dr. Khalid Hamoudeh, a former prisoner at Sde Teiman who was used as an assistant by the guards and had been ordered to receive Al-Bursh at the camp's gates, he was heavily beaten, unable to use the toilet without help, and believed that he had broken ribs. Hamoudeh also noted that he had breathing difficulties.

According to the IDF, Al-Bursh's processing at Sde Teiman was completed on 20 December, after which he was transferred to the Israel Prison Service (IPS). In April 2024, Al-Bursh was transferred to Ofer Prison near Jerusalem, where he died shortly after arrival. On 19 April 2024, the IPS confirmed Al-Bursh's death in custody at Ofer Prison, without disclosing the cause of his death.

Palestinian authorities and advocacy groups have attributed his death to torture or mistreatment in custody, and released prisoners told Al-Bursh's family that he had been subjected to torture. According to a deposition provided to HaMoked, an Israeli human rights organization, by a prisoner who knew Al-Bursh, he was injured upon his arrival at Ofer in mid-April and was "naked in the lower part of his body". This has been corroborated by a witness, cited in a 2025 report of the UN Independent International Commission of Inquiry on the Occupied Palestinian Territory. The deposition said that guards threw him down in the yard and left him there, unable to stand up, and that he died shortly after being helped to a room by prisoners. The IPS denied these events.

Al-Bursh's body was kept in Israeli custody, and the fate of the other detained medical workers remains uncertain. In May 2024, the family of Al-Bursh had a lawyer from The Hague look into his death and help facilitate the return of his body. On 15 May, Al-Bursh's wife and Physicians for Human Rights–Israel submitted a request for an investigation and autopsy to the Jerusalem Magistrate Court. Days later, Israel agreed to perform an autopsy, with a doctor representing the family present. As of March 2025, Al-Bursh's body remains withheld by the Israeli authorities.

=== Reactions ===
The Prisoners' Affairs Authority and the Palestinian Prisoners Club labelled Al-Bursh's death an "assassination" and a part of the "systematic targeting process against physicians and the health care system in Gaza". The Palestinian Ministry of Health wanted the investigation done immediately.

Francesca Albanese, UN Special Rapporteur for human rights in the occupied Palestinian territories, expressed her extreme alarm at the news of Al-Bursh's death and called for better protections for Palestinians. After additional details about his death were reported in November 2024, Albanese tweeted: "A doctor. A stellar surgeon. The embodiment of Palestinian ethics. Likely raped to death."

Tlaleng Mofokeng, UN Special Rapporteur on the Right to Health, described herself as "horrified" by his death, lamenting that Al-Bursh "died for trying to protect the rights to life and health of his patients". She called for an international investigation on the matter.

His death was highlighted as an example of the ongoing challenges and risks faced by healthcare workers in Gaza, with hundreds killed, injured or arrested. The Ministry of Health stated that 492 Palestinian doctors had been killed by Israel in the conflict. The international community and human rights organizations have repeatedly called for an end to attacks on medical personnel and the protection of Palestinians under Israeli occupation.

Al-Bursh's nephew, Mohammad Al-Bursh, described him as a "cheerful" and "loved" figure who dedicated his life to his profession, often working nonstop during the height of the conflict in Gaza. Colleagues praised him as a "rare individual" and the "safety valve" for orthopedic departments across Gaza's hospitals, often working tirelessly even during the height of conflicts in the region.

== See also ==
- List of civilians killed in the Gaza war
- Sexual and gender-based violence against Palestinians during the Gaza war
- Torture during the Gaza war
