= Al-Awda Hospital =

Hospital in Jabalia, Gaza Strip, Palestine

Al-Awda Hospital مستشفى العودة

Geography
- Location: Jabalia refugee camp, Gaza Strip, Gaza Governorate, Palestine
- Coordinates: 31°31′47.47″N 34°28′47.2″E

Organisation
- Care system: Emergency room, maternity ward
- Type: Treatment

History
- Founded: 1997

Al-Awda Hospital (Arabic: مستشفى العودة) is a hospital in the Gaza Strip, Palestine. The hospital provides basic medical care, with an emergency room and obstetric services for women in the northern Gaza Strip.

The hospital has the largest delivery room in the district and is the only one that provides fluoroscopy services. It runs training programs for nursing students in cooperation with universities in the Gaza Strip.

In October 2024, during the Gaza war, Israeli warplanes bombed the hospital at least three times; Israeli tanks also besieged the facility twice, once in December 2023 and again in October 2024, with the latter siege trapping 163 people in the hospital and drawing ire from Relief International and the World Health Organization.

Israel has killed Doctors Without Borders staff at the facility.

== Gaza War (2008–2009) ==
In 2009 an ambulance operating out of Al-Awda hospital in the northern city of Beit Lahiya was shelled, seriously injuring 4 medical staff.

== Gaza war (2023–present) ==
The World Health Organization (WHO) strongly condemned Israel's repeated orders to evacuate al-Awda Hospital in northern Gaza, calling it a death sentence for the sick and wounded. On 10 November, an Israeli strike was reported near Al-Awda Hospital, resulting in damage to an ambulance. On 21 November, Doctors Without Borders stated two of its doctors had been killed by a strike on the hospital. On 1 December, Doctors Without Borders stated the hospital had been damaged in a bombing.

=== 2023 siege ===
On 13 December, Branko Marcetic of Jacobin wrote that 240 people were trapped at al-Awda, surrounded by Israeli snipers, without clean water and surviving on one meal per day of bread or rice. A staffer at the hospital reported Israeli snipers had shot at a one pregnant civilian at the hospital. A hospital monitoring manager stated a nurse had been killed by an Israeli sniper on the hospital's fourth floor through the window. On 14 December, the Gaza Health Ministry stated their fear that after the Israeli raid of Kamal Adwan Hospital was complete, al-Awda would be their next target.

Renzo Fricke, an official at Doctors Without Borders, stated, "Reports coming out of Al-Awda hospital are harrowing and we are gravely worried for safety of patients and staff inside". On 17 December, the hospital director stated they were running low on water, food, oxygen, and medications. On December 19, reports emerged that Israeli forces have converted the hospital into their own 'military barracks'. According to the Gaza Health Ministry, 240 Palestinians, including staff and patients, are being held inside.

Doctors Without Borders reported Israeli troops seized Al Awda, with troops stripping, bounding, and interrogating all men and boys over the age of sixteen. Soldiers continued holding the hospital and in its premises they arrested Adnan al-Bursh, head of orthopaedics at al-Shifa Hospital, later died in Israeli prison.

=== May 2024 attack ===
In May 2024, the World Health Organization issued an alert for the hospital, with chief Tedros Adhanom Ghebreyesus, stating, "Medical staff inside the hospital reported an attack on 20 May, with snipers aiming at the building and an artillery rocket hitting the fifth floor". According to an Al-Awda doctor, medical staff were forced to leave the hospital the following day. Doctors Without Borders stated that after a four day siege, the hospital was "being forced to close". When Israeli forces stormed the hospital on 23 May, Adhanom Ghebreyesus stated, "WHO urgently calls for the protection of patients, companions and health workers inside the hospital and safe passage for their evacuation".
