= Courage and Civility Award =

Annual award distributed by Jeff Bezos since 2021

The Courage and Civility Award is an annual award distributed by Jeff Bezos and his wife Lauren Sánchez since 2021.

The award is accompanied by a cash grant for the receiver of the award, to distribute to other non-profit organizations. Each award comes with a ten-year window in which the funds have to be distributed.

== Winners ==
Year	Winner(s)	Award value	References
2021	Van Jones	$100 million	
2021	José Andrés	$100 million	
2022	Dolly Parton	$100 million	
2024	Eva Longoria	$50 million	
2024	Bill McRaven	$50 million	
2025	Kara Bell	$5 million	
2025	Dave Fink	$5 million	
2025	Richard Rusczyk	$5 million	
2025	Ilana Walder-Biesanz	$5 million	
2025	to be announced	$5 million	
