= José Andrés =

Spanish chef (born 1969)

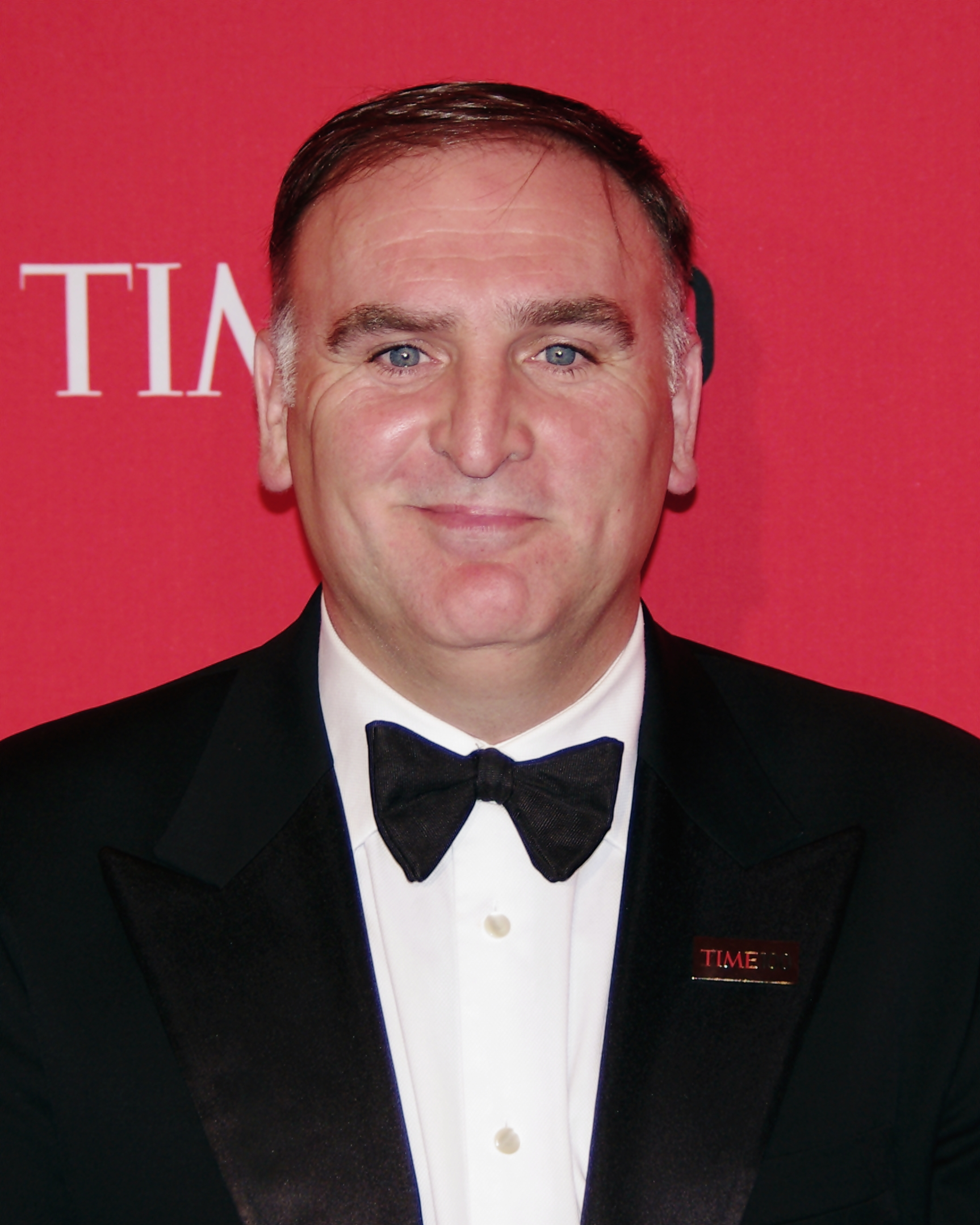
- Andrés in 2012
- Born: José Ramón Andrés Puerta; 13 July 1969 (age 57); Mieres, Asturias, Spain
- Occupation: Chef
- Spouse: Patricia Fernández de la Cruz
- Children: 3
- Awards: Michelin stars
- José Andrés's voice José Andrés on World Central Kitchen's humanitarian efforts during the Gaza war Recorded March 8, 2024

José Ramón Andrés Puerta (Spanish pronunciation: [xoˈse raˈmon anˈdɾes ˈpweɾta]; born 13 July 1969) is a Spanish and American chef, restaurateur, and humanitarian. Born in Spain, he moved to the United States in the early 1990s and since then, he has opened restaurants in several American cities. He has won awards for his cooking, including several James Beard Awards, and his humanitarian work. He is a professor as well as the founder of the Global Food Institute at George Washington University.

Andrés is the founder of World Central Kitchen (WCK), a non-profit organization devoted to providing meals in the wake of natural disasters. He is often credited with bringing the small plates dining concept to America. He was awarded a 2015 National Humanities Medal at a 2016 White House ceremony for his work with World Central Kitchen. In addition, he has received honorary doctorates from Georgetown University, George Washington University, Harvard University, and Tufts University. In March 2022, he was named as co-chair of the United States President's Council on Sports, Fitness, and Nutrition, a role he served in until he submitted his resignation one week before Donald Trump took office in January 2025.

== Early life and education ==
José Ramón Andrés Puerta was born in Mieres, Asturias, Spain, on 13 July 1969. Andrés' family moved to Catalonia when he was 6. He enrolled in culinary school in Barcelona at the age of 15, and when he needed to fulfill his Spanish military service at the age of 18, he was assigned to cook for an admiral. He met Spanish chef Ferran Adrià in Barcelona, and he worked for three years at Adrià's restaurant El Bulli in Roses, Catalonia, from 1988 to 1990. In December 1990, he was fired by Adrià and he decided to move to the United States.

== Culinary career ==
=== Coming to the United States ===
At the age of 21, Andrés arrived in New York City to cook in Midtown Manhattan at an outpost of a popular Spanish restaurant, Eldorado Petit. During his time in New York, he also staged servings at The Quilted Giraffe. In 1993, Andrés was hired to lead the kitchen at Jaleo, a new tapas restaurant in Washington, D.C. In subsequent years, he helped the owners of Jaleo to open more restaurants: Café Atlántico, Zaytinya and Oyamel, along with two more Jaleo outposts. In 2003, Andrés started a minibar – a restaurant space within a larger restaurant – at a six-seat counter within Café Atlántico. This Minibar eventually became a stand-alone restaurant with a twelve-seat counter. Seats are released on a monthly basis; according to the Washington Post they typically are reserved within 24 hours.

=== Chef and restaurateur ===
As he opened more restaurants in the U.S., Andrés became more well known in his native country Spain, starring in his own cooking show, Vamos a Cocinar, which debuted in 2005. He also published his first book, Tapas: A Taste of Spain in America, in 2005. In 2006, he partnered with Robert Wilder to form ThinkFoodGroup, making Andrés a co-owner in his restaurants. Together, they opened more restaurants in Miami, Los Angeles, Las Vegas, and Puerto Rico.

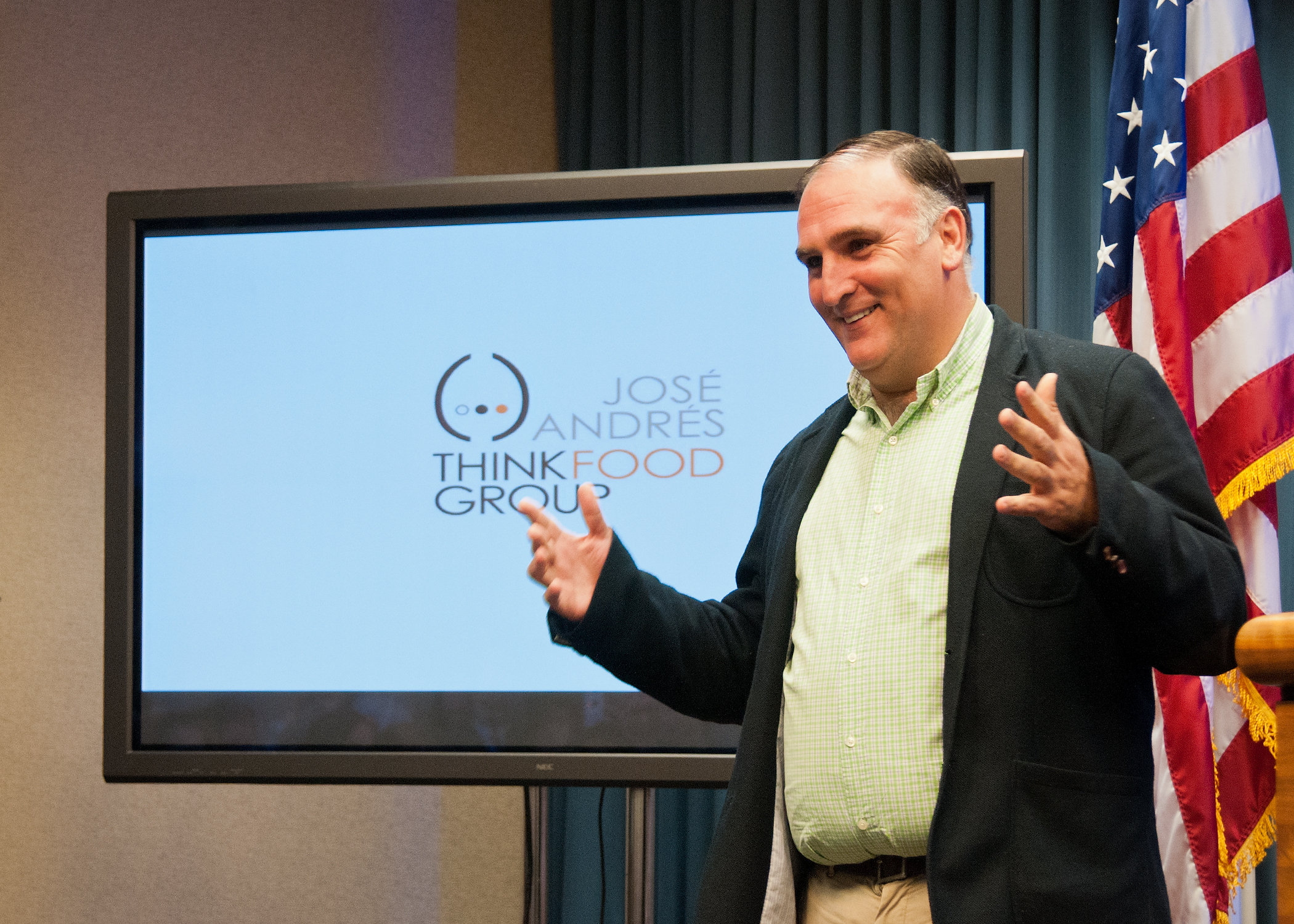
Andrés with White House Liaison Staff in 2012

Beginning in the fall of 2010, Andrés taught a culinary physics course at Harvard University with Ferran Adrià. In May 2012, Andrés was named dean of Spanish Studies at The International Culinary Center, where he and Colman Andrews developed a curriculum in traditional and modern Spanish cuisine, which debuted in February 2013. On 29 October 2012, he announced he was heading back to the classroom, and would teach his first course on how food shapes civilization at George Washington University. He did so until 2023, when he started the Global Food Institute at George Washington University.

=== Trump Hotel restaurant and lawsuit ===
Andrés planned to open a restaurant in the Trump International Hotel (also known as Old Post Office) in Washington, D.C., in 2016. After Donald Trump made disparaging comments about illegal Mexican immigrants in June 2015, Andrés withdrew from the contract with the Trump Organization, which then sued him. Andrés counter-sued, and the parties reached a settlement in April 2017.

The Trump International Hotel, Washington, D.C., closed on 11 May 2022. It was sold to CGI Merchant Group, and later reopened as the Waldorf Astoria Washington, D.C., on 1 June 2022. On 13 June 2022, Andrés announced that he would return to the location to open the restaurant that he had planned in the original 2015 deal. The Bazaar by José Andrés opened on 8 February 2023. Andrés remains an outspoken critic of Trump.

== World Central Kitchen ==
World Central Kitchen (WCK) raised almost $30 million in 2019, then $250 million in 2020. In response to the 2010 Haiti earthquake, Andrés provided locally cooked dishes specific to the region essential to comforting people touched by disasters. Since it was founded, the NGO has organized meals in the Dominican Republic, Nicaragua, Zambia, Peru, Cuba, Uganda, The Palestinian Territories, Cambodia, and in Poland on the border of Ukraine. It has provided aid and meals in the United States and Puerto Rico and has helped during the COVID-19 pandemic in the United States. Andrés runs WCK's operations with the help of about 200 colleagues including CEO Erin Gore and Director of Emergency response Sam Bloch.

In 2021, Jeff Bezos, the owner of The Washington Post and founder of Amazon, provided Andrés $100 million through his Courage and Civility Award. During the 2022 Russian invasion of Ukraine, Andrés announced that he was going to donate a part of the $100 million to the organization to address the humanitarian crisis in Ukraine.

In 2022, WCK took in $519 million in grants and donations.

On 1 April 2024, seven WCK employees in Gaza were killed by multiple Israeli drone strikes in the city of Deir al-Balah. Andrés rejected Israeli and U.S. assertions that the strike was not deliberate, stating the seven employees were "targeted deliberately" and killed "systematically, car by car". The Gaza war, he said, is "not a war against terrorism anymore" but a "war against humanity itself." He writes "We know Israelis. Israelis, in their heart of hearts, know that food is not a weapon of war. Israel is better than the way this war is being waged. It is better than blocking food and medicine to civilians. It is better than killing aid workers who had coordinated their movements with the Israel Defense Forces."

== Restaurants ==
Along with partner Rob Wilder, Andrés owns several restaurants:

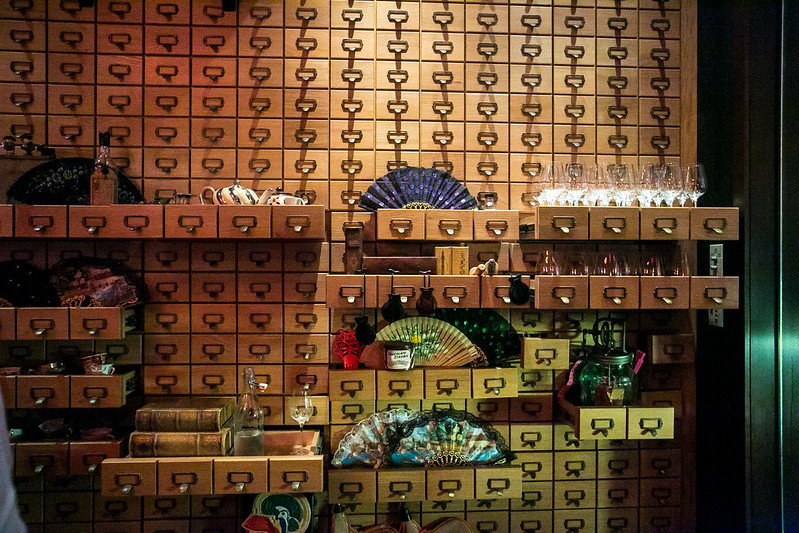
Inside of Andrés's restaurant é in 2013

- minibar by José Andrés – Washington, D.C. – several chefs serve a prix fixe menu of about 25 small courses to twelve diners at a time. Received two stars from the D.C. edition of the Michelin Guide in 2016.
- barmini by José Andrés – Washington, D.C. – Cocktail bar adjacent to minibar.
- é by José Andrés – Las Vegas – several chefs serve a prix fixe menu of about 25 small courses to nine diners at a time. Modeled after minibar and located inside Jaleo at the Cosmopolitan of Las Vegas.
- The Bazaar by José Andrés – Miami Beach, Washington, D.C., and New York City – A combination of traditional Spanish tapas and foods inspired by molecular gastronomy. Previously, in 2008, José Andrés opened The Bazaar within the SLS Beverly Hills hotel, with interiors designed by Phillippe Starck. Shortly after, he opened Saam at the Bazaar, a small tasting menu bar behind the main dining room, which was later relaunched in 2018 as Somni, with which the Spanish chef Aitor Zabala was awarded two Michelin stars. Both The Bazaar and Somni were forced to close in 2020 during the COVID-19 pandemic.
- Bazaar Meat by José Andrés – Las Vegas, Chicago, Los Angeles, and Washington, D.C. (opening in 2025) – Modern, high-end steakhouse featuring imported cuts of rare meat.
- Bar Mar by José Andrés – Chicago, Glendale (inside of VAI Resort), and Nashville (inside of W Hotel) – Seafood-focused happy hour venue with a raw bar and fancy cocktails.
- Bazaar Mar – Las Vegas (inside The Shops at Crystals) – Seafood-driven interactive restaurant highlighting Spanish flavors.
- Bar Centro – Las Vegas (adjacent to Bazaar Mar inside The Shops at Crystals) and Miami Beach (at the Andaz Miami Beach, a Hyatt property) – Spanish bakery and craft cocktail bar.
- Nubeluz – New York City – Rooftop cocktail bar at the Ritz-Carlton in NoMad, Manhattan.

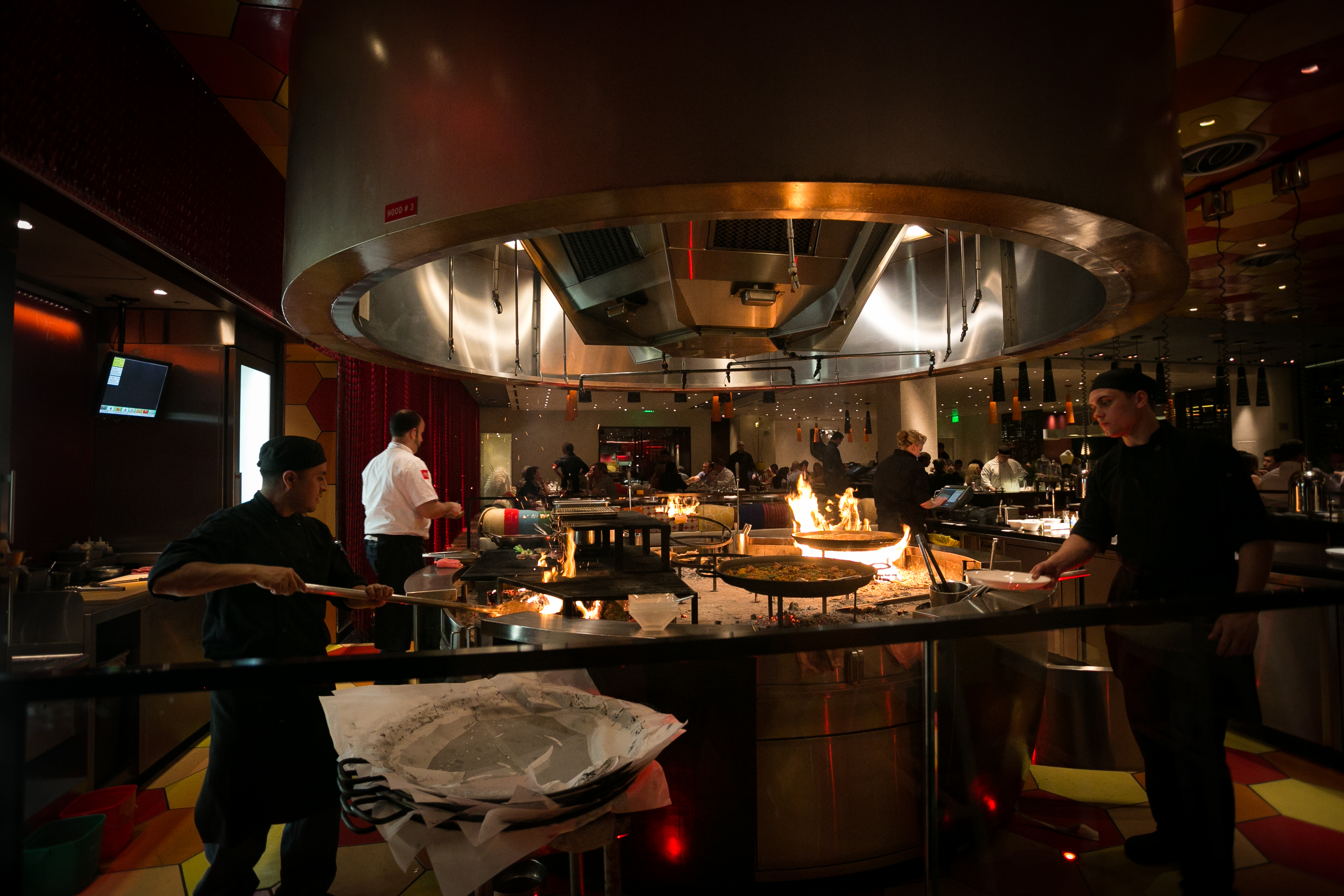
Jaleo restaurant in Las Vegas

- Aguasal – Miami Beach (at the Andaz Hotel) – Seafood-forward Mediterranean concept that highlights coastal flavors and Florida's abundant produce.
- Airlight – Downtown Los Angeles (at the Conrad Hotel) – Poolside café featuring handheld bites and creative cocktails.
- The Beaudry Room – Downtown Los Angeles (at the Conrad Hotel) – Lobby bar featuring experimental cocktails and bite-sized tapas.
- Butterfly — Culver City (located on the rooftop of the Shay Hotel, a Destination by Hyatt property) and Nashville (located on the rooftop of the W Hotel) — Mexican and Latin concept featuring tacos, ceviches, and agave spirits.
- China Chilcano by José Andrés – Washington, D.C. – Chinese, Japanese and Peruvian fusion. Included in Michelin Guide's Bib Gourmand list of exceptional restaurants at moderate prices.
- China Poblano by José Andrés – Las Vegas – Chinese and Mexican fusion.
- Fish by José Andrés – Paradise Island, Bahamas – Fresh Seafood and Bahamian Food
- Glowbird – Nashville (at the W Hotel) – Poolside cocktail bar featuring curated, handheld bites.
- Jaleo by José Andrés – Washington, D.C., Orlando (inside of Disney Springs entertainment complex), and Las Vegas – Traditional Spanish tapas. D.C. location included in Michelin Guide's Bib Gourmand list of exceptional restaurants at moderate prices.
- Mercado Little Spain – New York City – Spanish food hall in The Shops & Restaurants at Hudson Yards.
- Oyamel – New York City and Washington, D.C. – Small plates and antojitos. Included in Michelin Guide's Bib Gourmand list of exceptional restaurants at moderate prices.
- Pepe – Washington, D.C. (food truck) and Orlando (brick-and-mortar location inside of Disney Springs complex) – Fast-casual Spanish concept featuring sandwiches, salads, gazpacho, and more.
- San Laurel – Downtown Los Angeles (at the Conrad Hotel) – An interpretation of California cuisine through a Spanish lens.
- Spanish Diner – (Inside of NYC's Mercado Little Spain) – A Spanish take on the classic American diner. It serves asturian cuisine dishes including Arroz a la Cubana (a plate of rice, tomato and two fried eggs with sausage and sweet banana).
- Zaytinya – Washington, D.C., New York City, Miami Beach, Culver City, Las Vegas, Palo Alto, and Nashville – Small plates of food from the Mediterranean regions of Greece, Turkey, and Lebanon. Included in Michelin Guide's Bib Gourmand list of exceptional restaurants at moderate prices.

== Awards and honors ==
=== Awards and prizes ===
- 2003 – Best Chef of the Mid-Atlantic Region, James Beard Foundation
- 2010 – Order of Arts and Letters of Spain, Spanish government
- 2010 – Vilcek Prize in Culinary Arts
- 2011 – Outstanding Chef, James Beard Foundation
- 2015 – National Humanities Medal, National Endowment for the Humanities (NEH), United States government
- 2015 – Medal for Tourist Merit, in the "Internationalization" category, Spanish government
- 2017 – Lifetime Achievement Award, International Association of Culinary Professionals
- 2017 – Gold Medal of Merit in the Fine Arts, Spanish government
- 2018 – James Beard Foundation Award for Humanitarian of the Year
- 2019 – Julia Child Award from the Julia Child Foundation for Gastronomy and the Culinary Arts
- 2019 – TIME for Kids' Person of the Year
- 2020 – John Steinbeck Award from the Martha Heasley Cox Center for Steinbeck Studies at San Jose State University.
- 2021 – Princess of Asturias Award in the category "Concord".
- 2021 – Recipient of second Courage and Civility Award from Jeff Bezos at a press conference following Blue Origin's first human flight (includes US$100 million to distribute to non-profit organizations of Andrés' choice)
- 2022 – Order of Merit (Ukraine), 2nd class
- 2023 – Daytime Emmy Award for Outstanding culinary series for José Andrés and Family in Spain
- 2024 – Grand Cross of Naval Merit, with white decoration, Spanish Navy
- 2025 – Presidential Medal of Freedom, for being a “renowned Spanish-American culinary innovator who popularized tapas in the United States. His World Central Kitchen provides large-scale relief to communities affected by natural disasters and conflict around the world”.
- 2026 – Ivan Allen Jr. Prize for Social Courage, for being "a man whose moral compass never wavered" This award includes a monetary stipend of $100,000.
- 2026 – Member of the European Order of Merit

=== Media recognition ===
- 2004 – Saveur 100 List, Saveur
- 2004 – Chef of the Year, Bon Appetit
- 2009 – Chef of the Year, GQ
- 2012 – One of the world's 100 most influential people, Time
- 2016 – Michelin Guide Washington, D.C., 2 Michelin stars for minibar by José Andrés
- 2018 – One of the world's 100 most influential people, Time

=== Honorary degrees ===
- In May 2014, Andrés received an honorary doctorate degree in public service from George Washington University and served as the university's commencement speaker at the National Mall the same year.
- In May 2018, Andrés received an honorary Doctor of Public Service degree from Tufts University and served as the commencement speaker for the Gerald J. and Dorothy R. Friedman School of Nutrition Science and Policy at Tufts University.
- In 2019, Andrés received an honorary degree from Georgetown University.
- In May 2022, Andrés received an honorary degree from Harvard University.

=== Appointments ===
- In 2015, Andrés was appointed by President Barack Obama as an ambassador for citizenship and naturalization.
- In 2022, Andrés was appointed by President Joe Biden as co-chair of the President's Council on Sports, Fitness, & Nutrition.
- In 2024, Andrés was appointed as a member of The Earthshot Prize Council.

== Personal life ==
Andrés married Patricia "Tichi" Fernández de la Cruz in September 1995. The couple has three daughters; they live in Bethesda, Maryland, United States. He met his wife while they were both living in Washington, D.C.; she is originally from Cádiz, Andalusia, in the southwest of Spain. He became a naturalized U.S. citizen in December 2013.

Andrés is an avid golfer and loves cigars. He is a fan of the Washington Nationals and has thrown out the ceremonial first pitch at Nationals games, including during the 2019 World Series.

He has a collection of 1500 rare cookbooks, including an 1825 first edition of Jean Anthelme Brillat-Savarin's The Physiology of Taste, a rents and receipts notepad from 1795 that belonged to Thomas Jefferson’s chef Honoré Julien, and an 1851 edition of The Virginia House-Wife by Mary Randolph. He has expressed a predilection for his early edition of Auguste Escoffier’s Ma Cuisine, his first edition of Irma S. Rombauer's Joy of Cooking, and Ángel Muro's El Practicón.

=== Politics ===
On 5 November 2024, Andrés said he would run against Rep. Andy Harris in the 2026 election for Maryland's 1st Congressional district. He called Harris, a Republican and chair of the House Freedom Caucus, a "disgrace making so many lies and hateful rhetoric."

== Filmography ==
Date	Title	Type	Role	Episode(s)	Notes
2005–2007	Vamos a cocinar	Television	Producer and host		Vamos a cocinar, a food program on Televisión Española.
2007	Iron Chef America	Television	Himself, chef		defeated Bobby Flay.
2008	Made in Spain	Television			a 26-part series for public television.
2008	Anthony Bourdain: No Reservations	Television	Himself, chef	Season 4, Episode 18	Washington, D.C., episode.
2010	Top Chef	Television	Guest judge	season 7, episode 8, "Foreign Affair"	
2011	Anthony Bourdain: No Reservations	Television	Himself, chef	Season 7, Episode 12, "El Bulli"	
2013	The Taste	Television	Guest judge, mentor		
2013–2015	Hannibal	Television	Culinary consultant		
2017	American Masters	Television	Himself, chef	season 31, episode 5, "Jacques Pépin: The Art of Craft"	Discussing working with chef, Jacques Pépin.
2018	Anthony Bourdain: Parts Unknown	Television	Himself, chef	season 12, episode 2	Filmed in Asturias, Spain
2021	Selena + Chef	Television	Himself	season 2, episode 3, "Selena + José Andrés"	
2021	Waffles + Mochi	Television	Himself, chef	season 1, episode 1, "Tomato"	
2021	Tom + Talks	Podcast	Himself, chef	season 1, episode 9, "Tom Talks - Ep9 w/ Chef José Andrés"	
2022	Green Eggs and Ham	Television	Sylvester (voice)	season 2, episode 2, "Tinker Tailor Mother Spy"	
2022	We Feed People	Documentary	Himself		This documentary, which Ron Howard directed, focuses on World Central Kitchen, a nonprofit that José Andrés founded, and his involvement with it.
2022–2025	Firebuds	Television	Chef Al (voice)	3 episodes	
2022	José Andrés and Family in Spain	Television	Himself	6 episodes	Awarded a Daytime Emmy
2024	Dinner Party Diaries with José Andrés	Television	Himself	1 episode	
2025	Yes, Chef!	Television	Himself, host		
2025	Finding Your Roots	Television	Guest	season 11, episode 5, "Family Recipes"	

== Bibliography ==
- Andrés, José (2007). Vamos a Cocinar (in Spanish). Planeta Pub Corp. ISBN 978-8408070368. – a book based on his Spanish cooking show Vamos a cocinar.
- Andrés, José; Wolffe, Richard (November 2008). Made in Spain: Spanish Dishes for the American Kitchen. Clarkson Potter. ISBN 978-0-307-38263-4.
- Andrés, José; Wolffe, Richard (November 2005). Tapas: A Taste Of Spain In America. Clarkson Potter. ISBN 978-1-4000-5359-9. – a cookbook on tapas and Spanish cuisine
- Andrés, José; Wolffe, Richard (2018). We Fed an Island: The True Story of Rebuilding Puerto Rico, One Meal at a Time. Anthony Bourdain/Ecco. ISBN 978-0062864482. – after Hurricane Maria in 2017, Chef José Andrés had a "crazy dream" to feed Puerto Rico.
- Andrés, José; Goulding, Matt (2019). Vegetables Unleashed—A Cookbook. Anthony Bourdain/Ecco. ISBN 978-0062668387.
- Andrés, José; Chapple-Sokol, Sam; World Central Kitchen (2023). The WCK Cookbook — Feeding Hope, feeding Humanity. Clarkson Potter. ISBN 9780593579077. – a cookbook on dishes served on the ground with his NGO and recipes celebrating the countries they have served.
- Andrés, José; Costa, Michael (2023). Zaytinya — Delicious Mediterranean Dishes from Greece, Turkey, and Lebanon. HarperCollins/Ecco Press. ISBN 9780063327900.
- Andrés, José (April 2025). Change the Recipe: Because You Can’t Build a Better World Without Breaking Some Eggs. HarperCollins. ISBN 978-0-06-343615-2.
- Andrés, José; Chapple-Sokol, Sam (May 2026). Spain My Way: Eat, Drink, and Cook Like a Spaniard. Ecco Press. ISBN 978-0-063-32806-8.

== See also ==
- Mediterranean cuisine
- Molecular gastronomy
