= 8 July 2024 Russian strikes on Ukraine =

- Part of attacks on civilians in the Russian invasion of Ukraine
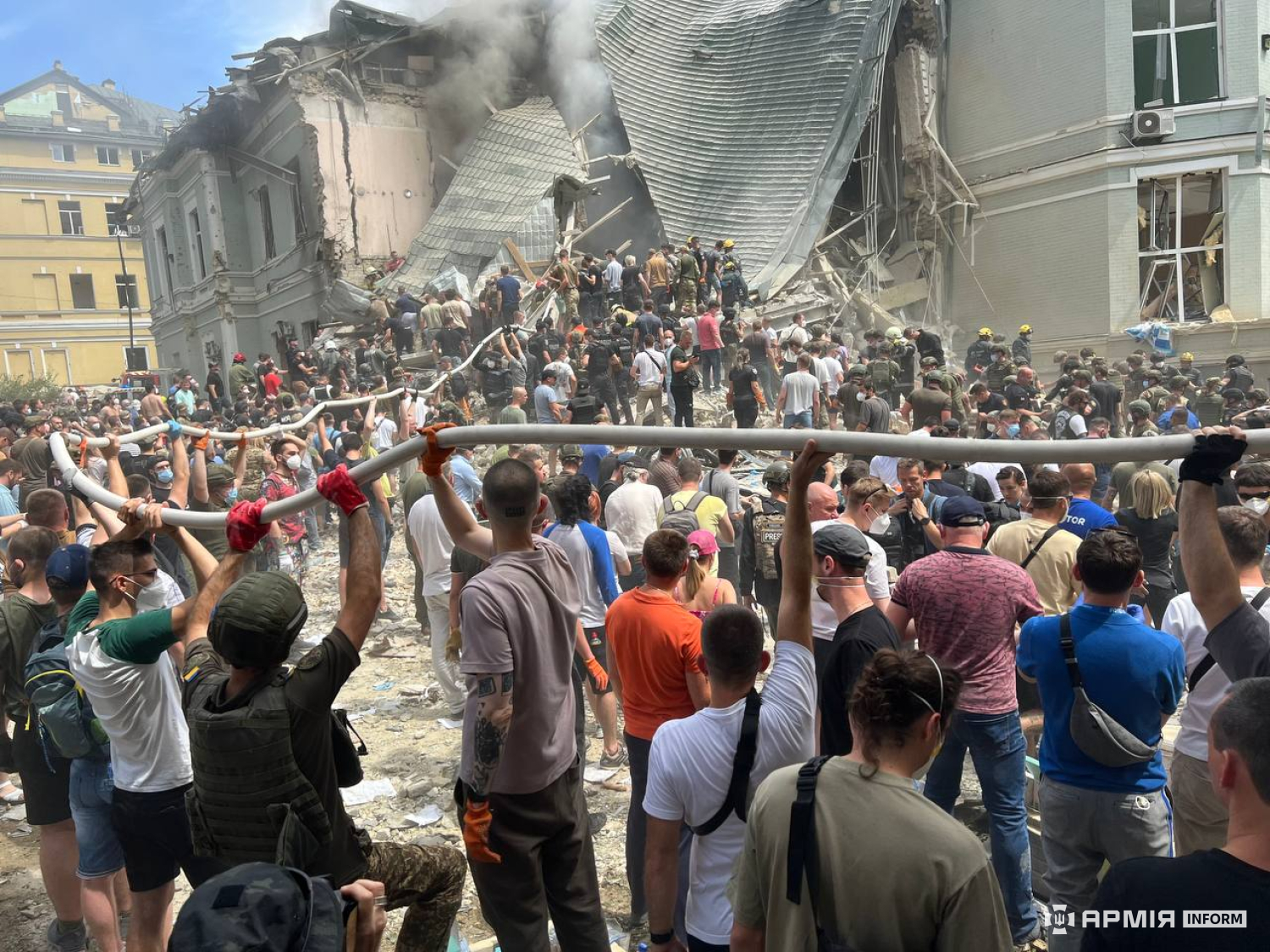
- The Okhmatdyt children's hospital following the Russian airstrike, which killed two adults
- Location: Kyiv, Kryvyi Rih, Dnipro, Pokrovsk, Kropyvnytskyi
- Date: 8 July 2024; 10 a.m.
- Attack type: Missile and guided bomb strike
- Weapons: Kh-101 and others
- Deaths: ≥47
- Injuries: ≥189
- Perpetrator: Russia

A massive missile attack on Ukraine occurred on 8 July 2024 during the Russo-Ukrainian War. Kyiv, Kryvyi Rih, Dnipro, Kropyvnytskyi, and Pokrovsk came under fire from more than forty missiles of the Russian military. In total, at least 47 people were killed and about 170 were injured.

In Kyiv, the Artem military plant was hit. The strikes also damaged residential buildings and infrastructure. A strike notably hit the Okhmatdyt children's hospital, the country's largest, killing two adults. The Security Service of Ukraine defined Russia's attack on the children's hospital as a war crime and initiated criminal proceedings into the matter. The international community condemned the attacks. Human Rights Watch also wrote that the strike against the children’s hospital should be investigated as a war crime.

== Attack ==
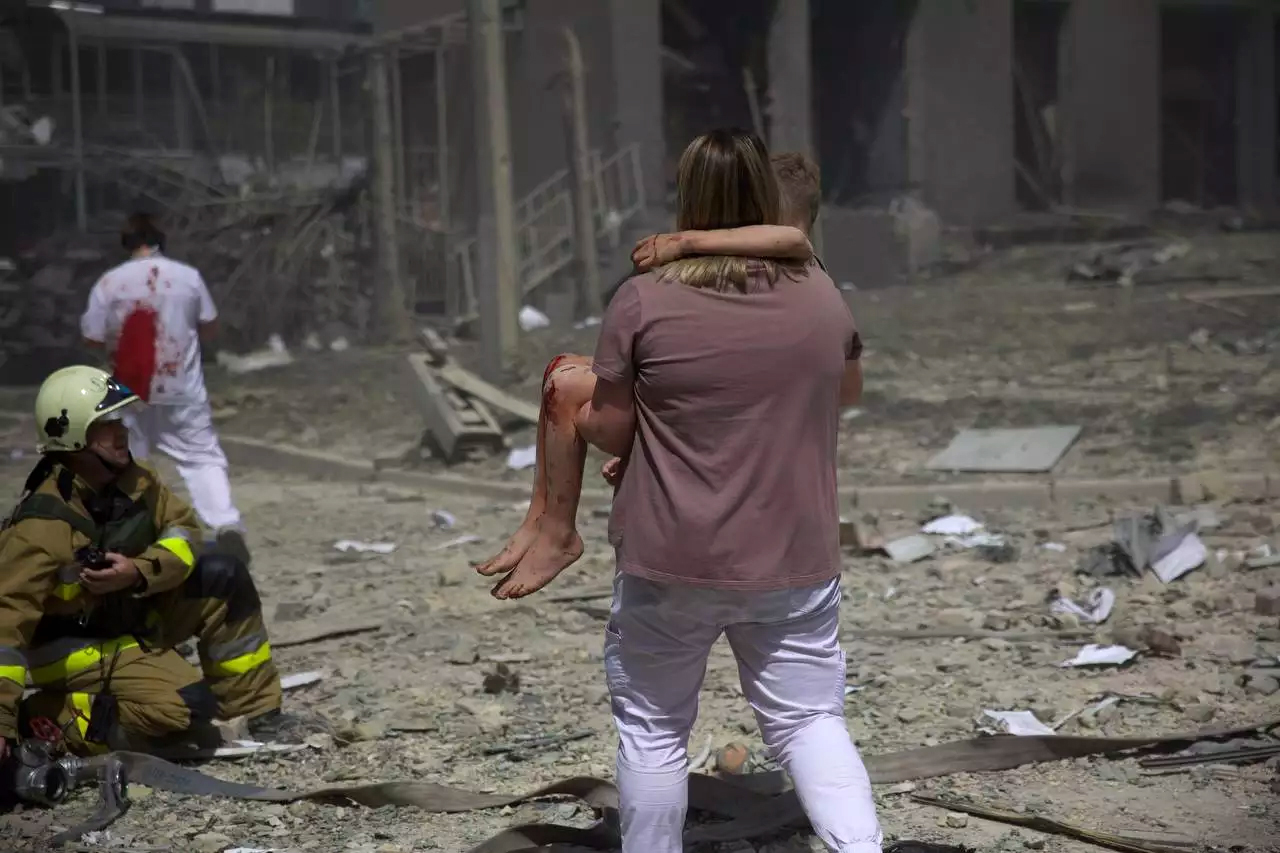
Evacuation of a child near Okhmatdyt children's hospital

Around 10 a.m. Russian forces launched more than 40 missiles towards Ukraine.

=== Kyiv ===
In Kyiv, Solomianskyi, Dniprovskyi, Darnytskyi, Sviatoshynskyi, Desnianskyi, Shevchenkivskyi and Holosiivskyi districts of the city were affected.

Six Russian missiles struck the Artem military plant. Russia claims that the plant produced munitions, while Ukrainian side denies this. Associated Press stated that the plant produced "components for various military-grade missiles". The plant had already been hit during Russian missile attacks in December 2023.

In the Solomianskyi District, missiles hit a building with offices, as well as several floors of a multi-storey building. The total area of destruction was 1,500 square meters, and seven people were killed. In the Holosiivskyi District, residential buildings, garages, and cars were damaged. In the Dniprovskyi District there was a missile attack in the area. In the Darnytskyi district, a private house was damaged by the impact. Fires broke out in the Desnianskyi and Sviatoshynskyi districts due to the attack. In the Shevchenkivskyi district, an apartment building was destroyed, and one entrance was completely destroyed. The residents had to be evacuated.

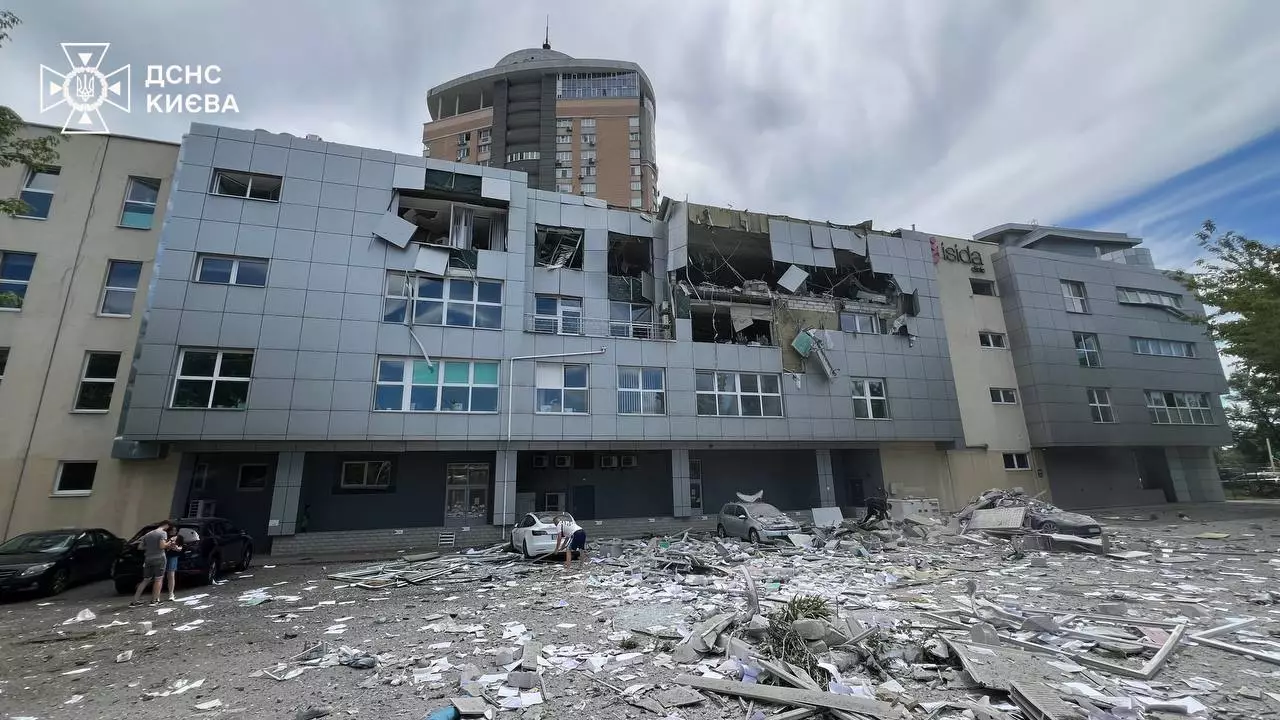
Damaged building in Kyiv (Dniprovskyi District), which houses medical centers "Adonis" and "Isida"

Overall in Kyiv, 33 people were killed, including five children, and 121 were injured, 10 of them children, according to officials.

==== Okhmatdyt children's hospital ====
A missile hit the toxicology department of the Okhmatdyt children's hospital. The roof of the building collapsed, resulting in the death of two adults. Ukrainian authorities stated that 16 people were injured, including seven children. Cancer patients were evacuated from the hospital with their parents. At the time of the strike, there were over 600 patients in the hospital. Among them were children from neighboring Moldova, one of whom was at the operating table at that moment.

The community of analysts Molfar claimed that the attack on Okhmatdyt was carried out by pilots and maintenance personnel of the Engels-2 airbase in Saratov Oblast.

Russia claimed that the strikes were retaliation and hit defence industry targets and the destruction was caused by Ukrainian air defenses. The Security Service of Ukraine said it had found fragments of a Kh-101 missile. According to OSINT analysis, the Kh-101 missile was fully functional, powered by jet engine in flight and undamaged until impact. UN Human Rights Monitoring Mission representatives confirmed these findings with "high likelihood" after visiting the impact site.

Russian military bloggers claimed that Russian forces attempted to strike the Artem military plant, located approximately 1.6 km from the Okhmatdyt hospital and used to produce aviation rockets. The Institute for the Study of War noted that the strike on the plant was carried out by a different salvo of missiles.

The Conflict Intelligence Team does not rule out that the hospital strike was deliberate, nor that it could have been caused by a possible programming error in the missile's flight path or a technical malfunction of the missile itself, which led to it veering off course.

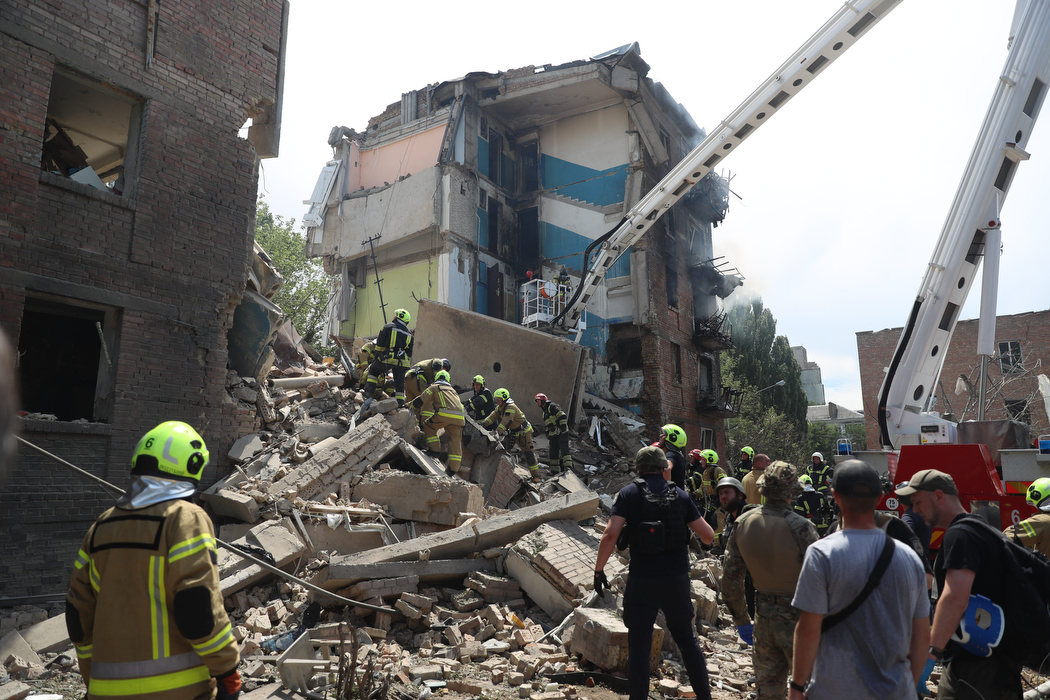
Destroyed residential building in Kyiv (Shevchenkivskyi District)

=== Kryvyi Rih ===
In Kryvyi Rih, 10 people were killed and 53 more were injured after a Russian missile strike hit an administrative building at a coal processing plant.

=== Dnipro ===
In Dnipro, a strike hit a high-rise building, killing one person and injuring 12 others.

=== Pokrovsk ===
In Pokrovsk, three people were killed, while three others were injured.

== Reactions ==
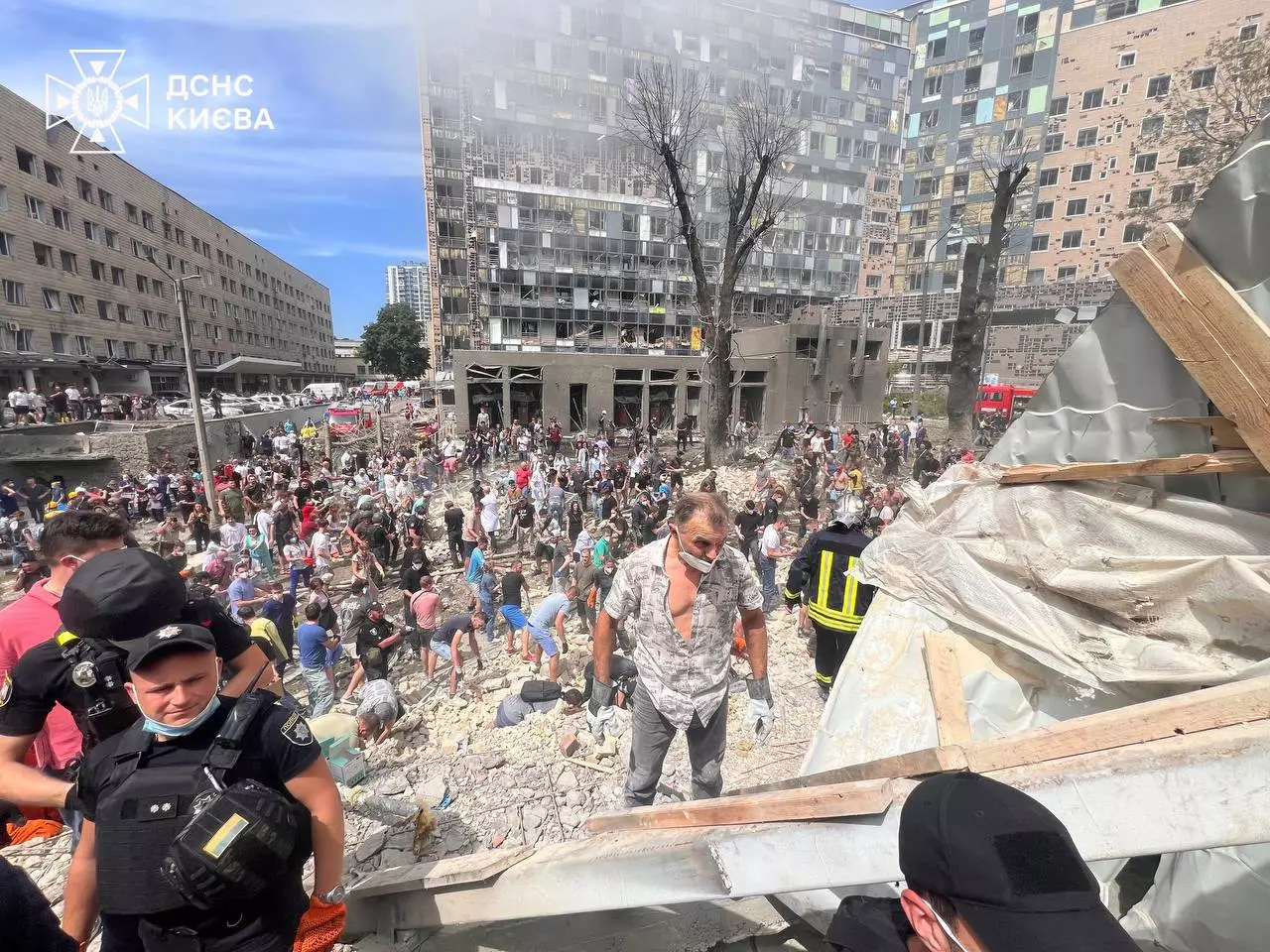
Devastation around the Okhmatdyt children's hospital after the Russian attack

=== Ukraine ===
A day of mourning was declared on 9 July in Kryvyi Rih. Kyiv's Mayor Vitali Klitschko accused Russia of "genocide of the Ukrainian population".

President Volodymyr Zelenskyy called on NATO members states to show a "greater resilience and stronger response" to Russia's attacks on Ukrainian land and children, calling for concrete action towards providing air defense. Presidential adviser Mykhailo Podolyak stated that calls for an "immediate ceasefire" by Hungary and China only pushes further Russian aggression by spreading a "false feeling" that "the aggressor has the right to kill because he speaks of ‘peace’, and the victim should not defend himself". The attacks happened just before a NATO summit in Washington was planned to be held, with Ukraine participating.

Prosecutor General Andriy Kostin reported sending all information about the attacks to the International Criminal Court.

On her Wimbledon Championships match against Wang Xinyu on 8 July, tennis player Elina Svitolina wore a black ribbon on her sporting gear in memory of the victims of the strikes.

Alla Nesolionova, a doctor at the cardiology center at the Okhmatdyt children's hospital, stated "The only thing I want is for this to be back to them a million times worse. I want them to feel it on their own skin."

=== Russia ===
On 8 July the Russian defence ministry stated that "in response to attempts by the Kyiv regime to damage Russian energy and economic facilities", Russian forces had carried out strikes on defence industry targets and aviation bases in Ukraine, claiming that damage to civilian infrastructure was done by a falling Ukrainian air defense missile launched from within the city. The ministry claimed it had achieved its objectives and struck all designated targets.

=== United Nations and NGO groups ===
UN Secretary-General António Guterres called Russia's missile strikes "particularly shocking". Denise Brown, UN aid coordinator in Ukraine, condemned the attack and called for civilians to be protected. Munir Mammadzade, UNICEF representative, said that the Russian invasion "continues impacting children disproportionately". The United Nations Security Council planned an ad hoc meeting on 9 July in response to the civilian attacks after being requested to by France, Britain, Slovenia, Ecuador, and the United States. UN Human Rights Monitoring Mission declared "high likelihood" of "direct hit" by Russian missile rather than debris.

Amnesty International condemned the attack and placed the blame on Russia, calling its attempt to blame Ukraine for the attack "a callous audacity". Human Rights Watch wrote: "Attacks directed at medical facilities are war crimes under international humanitarian law, and the strike that hit Okhmatdyt children’s hospital should be investigated as a potential war crime".

=== Other countries ===
The French Foreign Ministry referred to the attacks as "barbaric", specifically citing deliberate attacks on a children's hospital as "added to the list of war crimes" Russia propagated during the war. Foreign Minister of Italy Antonio Tajani condemned the attacks and asserted the Italian government's commitment to defending Ukraine's sovereignty.

German Health Minister Karl Lauterbach announced that Germany is ready to provide medical assistance to Ukrainian children affected by the missile attack on the Okhmatdyt children's hospital.

US President Joe Biden referred to the attacks as "a horrific reminder of Russia's brutality" and called on the international community to stand with Ukraine and to not disregard Russian acts of aggression. He also stated that his government and NATO would announce more programs to grant aid and support to Ukraine, including increasing their air defense capabilities.

British Prime Minister Keir Starmer condemned "attacking innocent children" as the "most depraved of actions".

Czech Foreign Minister Jan Lipavský said, "Murderers who attack children in hospitals are the dregs of humanity."

Indian Prime Minister Narendra Modi told reporters while seated alongside Russian President Vladimir Putin that "any person who believes in humanity is troubled when there are deaths, especially when innocent children die." Modi visited Moscow to meet Putin on 8 July 2024. The two embraced as Modi climbed out of his car; this act was criticized by Ukrainian President Volodymyr Zelenskyy as it happened on the same day that Russian missiles struck a children's hospital in Kyiv.

Moldovan President Maia Sandu condemned the strike against the children's hospital, protested against what she called war crimes and a "war against children" and called for a future in which every child "has the chance to live in peace and well-being". Moldovan Deputy Prime Minister for European Integration Cristina Gherasimov visited the hospital to pay tribute to the victims, condemning the strike and calling for war crimes to be judged.

== See also ==
- Mariupol hospital airstrike
- Russian strikes on hospitals during the Russian invasion of Ukraine
- Russian–Syrian hospital bombing campaign
