= Manukhta Di Sewa Society =

Sikh charity

- Manukhta Di Sewa Sabh Tooh Vadi Sewa Society
- Formation: 2016
- Founder: Gurpreet Singh Mintu
- Headquarters: Village Hasanpur, Behind Harshella Resort, Ferozpur-Ludhiana Road, Ludhiana - 141102
- Website: https://manukhtadisewa.org/

Manukhta Di Sewa Society (M.D.S.S.), or the Manukhta Di Sewa Sabh Tooh Vadi Sewa, is a Sikh charity that operates in Punjab, India. The organization focuses on helping the mentally-challenged and also in-general the poor, homeless, sick and marginalized members of society. It is headquartered in Hassanpur village, Behind Harsheela Resort, Ludhiana-Firozpur Road, Ludhiana.

== History ==
The charity was founded in 2016 by Gurpreet Singh, a former dhaba owner, after he and his friend had helped a paralyzed person named Arun Kumar Shukla whilst Gurpreet was working in Dhaba situated on Ludhiana Delhi Road, at Doraha. Thereafter, Gurpreet began to care for people he believed society had abandoned and homed them in a building on his property that became known as the Manukhta di Sewa Society. The founder of the organization, Gurpreet Singh Mintu Malwa, was nominated as a finalist for the Robert Burns Humanitarian Award 2025 (RBHA).

== Activities ==
The outfit is based in Ludhiana, where it operates a guesthouse homing the individuals under the care of the body. The organization locates destitute people living outside religious buildings, hospitals, and slums, and provides them care, sustenance, medicine, and shelter, aiming to restore the dignity of the sufferers. It also helps reconnect individuals estranged from their families. Most of the patients cared for by the organization are male, with females being fewer in-number. The organization cares for people of all gender, religious, and caste-backgrounds. The shelter of the organization generally houses around 200 patients at any given point of time. Through its efforts, hundreds of people have recovered and been returned to their families. However, some opt to remain at the shelter, provided that they assist with the functioning of the charity. The organization is tackling the issue of modern-slavery and drug-addiction in Punjab, India. Bi-weekly medical camps are held by the organization to provide help to people suffering from visual impairment. It also provides monthly food rations to impoverished families. Furthermore, it helps fund the education of students from poor-backgrounds. The charity also assists those from well-to-do families who have fallen on hard-times.
