= Russian–Syrian hospital bombing campaign =

Series of attacks on hospitals in the Syrian civil war

- Part of Russian involvement in the Syrian civil war
Date	September 2015 – 8 December 2024
Location	Syria
Result	Campaign ended with the fall of the Assad regime

During the Syrian civil war, Russian and Syrian government forces have conducted a campaign that has focused on the destruction of hospitals and medical facilities within areas not under the control of the Bashar al-Assad. Russian and Syrian officials have repeatedly denied deliberately targeting medical facilities.

== Background ==
Prior to Russian forces taking an active combat role in the Syrian Civil War, Syrian government forces had previously attacked medical facilities in areas not under their control, beginning in early 2012. These attacks included one in August 2012, and one in November 2012, both on the Dar al-Shifa Hospital in Aleppo. United Nations investigators called the attacks systematic. China and Russia blocked a 2014 attempt to refer the Syrian government to the International Criminal Court. Physicians for Human Rights estimates that medical facilities were attacked over 300 times between March 2011 and August 2015, with 90% of attacks being conducted by Syrian government forces.

=== Russian withdrawal from UN agreement ===
In June 2020, Russia announced its decision to quit a voluntary UN agreement that aims to protect hospitals, medical facilities and humanitarian aid deliveries in Syria; under which, the locations of such facilities were shared with the conflicting parties in a bid to prevent them from being targeted.

== Medical facilities attacked by Russian or Syrian forces in Syria ==
=== 2015–2018 ===
After Russia began military operations in Syria, aerial bombardment intensified. In 2015, there were more than 300 attacks on medical facilities by Syrian and Russian forces. From May to December 2016, medical facilities were attacked about 200 times by Russian and Syrian forces.

Hospitals in Aleppo were attacked multiple times. Before March 2016, more than six hospitals were attacked in the Aleppo Governorate. In April 2016, over two dozen were killed when a Russian airstrike hit a hospital; the hospital served as the area's primary pediatric care facility. In July 2016, M2 Hospital was attacked by aircraft. By the end of the month, six hospitals in Aleppo had been destroyed. In October 2016, M10 Hospital was attacked by airstrikes.

Hospital attacks were not limited to Aleppo. In October 2015, a Russian aircraft attacked a medical facility operated by the Syrian American Medical Society in the town of Sarmin. In February 2016, a children's hospital was hit in Azaz; Russians claimed they targeted ISIL infrastructure. That same month two hospitals in Maarrat al-Nu'man were attacked by Syrian forces, one being a Doctors Without Borders supported facility; Syria claimed that one of the attacks was done by American forces. In July 2016, a hospital was attacked by Russian forces in Atarib. In August 2016, a medical facility was attacked once every 17 hours. One of these attacks was an attack on the last functioning hospital in Darayya; the attack was done with barrel bombs filled with napalm. In April 2017, a hospital was attacked in Maarat al-Nu'man. After a chemical attack on Khan Sheikhoun, a clinic treating those who were gassed was attacked by Syrian forces; due to this event U.S. launched a missile strike against Shayrat Air Base.

In September 2017, Qasioun News reported that Syrian government warplanes carried out several airstrikes on Rahma Hospital in Khan Sheikhon city, southern Idlib, causing material damage to the building and causing the hospital to go out of service, as well as injuries among civilians. Furthermore, Syrian government warplanes carried out 3 airstrikes on Orient Hospital, near Kafranabl area, south of Idlib, but no casualties were reported. Also on same date, the Russian warplanes conducted airstrikes on al-Tah Hospital in the countryside of Idlib, killing two nurses and some patients, and inflicting heavy damage to the hospital, as well as causing some injuries among the doctors.

In October 2017, the ICRC said that up to 10 hospitals had been reportedly damaged in the past 10 days, cutting off hundreds of thousands of people from access to healthcare, voicing alarm at the situation from Raqqa to Idlib and eastern Ghouta. "For the past two weeks, we have seen an increasingly worrying spike in military operations that correlates with high levels of civilian casualties," Marianne Gasser, head of the ICRC's delegation in Syria, said.

Attacks on hospitals in Idlib continued into early 2018, following use of chemical weapons against areas controlled by forces opposed to the Syrian government. In April 2018, chemical weapons were used in an attack on a hospital in Douma; the hospital had been supported by the Syrian American Medical Society. Non-Russian and non-Syrian claims were that the chemical attack was carried out by Syrian forces. The Syrian government denied conducting a chemical attack. Russia denied that chemical weapons were used in Douma; later it claimed that the attack was staged by the United Kingdom. As a result of the attack on Douma, Israeli aircraft attacked an air base in Syria on 9 April; French, British, and American forces attacked targets in Syria on 14 April.

=== 2019–2024 ===
The UN humanitarian office said that, between late April and June 2019, a total of 24 health facilities and 35 schools were hit by the Syrian government and Russian air raids and rocket fire on the Idlib region. The coordinates of nine of those health facilities were shared with the UN, which passed them to Russia in an effort to protect them from being bombed and encourage some form of accountability for attacks. Instead, they also came under fire. On 15 May 2019, Syrian government forces bombed the Tarmala Maternity and Children's Hospital in South Idlib, completely destroying the facility, which had served about 6,000 people a month. According to the Union of Medical Care and Relief Organizations, it was the 19th health-care facility bombed in Syria since 28 April.

Assembled a large body of evidence such as social media posts from Syria, interviews with witnesses, records from charities, Russian Air Force radio recordings, and plane-spotter logs, The New York Times reported that, within 12 hours from 5 to 6 May 2019, four hospitals in southern Idlib province were attacked and the bombings were traced and tied Russian pilots to each one, and the audio recordings featured Russian pilots confirming each bombing. These hospitals were Nabad al Hayat Surgical Hospital, Kafr Nabl Surgical Hospital, Kafr Zita Cave Hospital, and Al Amal Orthopedic Hospital.

In October 2019, The New York Times published a story that proved that Russian forces deliberately bombed four hospitals in opposition-held Idlib province in May 2019. Dr. Amani Ballour, a Syrian pediatrician, worked at a secret underground hospital in East Ghouta known as the Cave, said the hospital was bombed by Russian warplanes on 28 September 2015, killing three male nurses and injuring two female nurses. Since 2016, the staffs did everything they could to shore up the infrastructure above and below ground so it could withstand bombings. During the final month of the Cave, the site was hit five or six times by barrel bombs.

In February 2020, Russian warplanes hit two hospitals, as well as residential areas, in the northern town of Darat Izza near the Turkish border, wounding civilians and forcing the medical facilities to close. At this time, the World Health Organization (WHO) said that over half of the country's health facilities had been damaged or destroyed since the start of the civil war in 2011.

In May 2020, Amnesty International documented 18 attacks on civilian facilities, including medical facilities, by either the Syrian government or Russia between 5 May 2019 and 25 February 2020 in and adjoining the opposition stronghold in northwest Syria. The report which contained 40 pages revealed thoroughly how the Syrian government forces intentionally attacked civilian facilities such as schools and hospitals. Among the documented attacks were Russian air strikes near a hospital in the town of Ariha on 29 January that flattened at least two residential buildings and killed 11 civilians.

== Casualties ==
Physicians for Human Rights (a New York City-based NGO), an advocacy group that monitored attacks on medical workers in Syria, documented at least 583 such attacks since 2011 to October 2019, 266 of them since Russia intervened in September 2015, and at least 916 medical workers were killed since 2011 till the date of the report.

== International reaction ==
The attacks on hospitals have been described as a "sophisticated strategy" in The Interpreter. Medics in the rebel-held area have been forced underground in order to survive.

In October 2015, the United States Department of State Spokesman John Kirby said that hospitals in Syria were attacked by Russian forces. In February 2016, U.S. Air Force Lieutenant General Charles Q. Brown Jr. said that Russia was responsible for attacking hospitals in Syria. In late September 2016, United Nations Secretary-General Ban Ki-moon said attacks on hospitals in Aleppo constituted war crimes, and the UN repeatedly accused the Syrian government and Russian warplanes of conducting a deadly campaign that appears to target medical facilities.

In October 2016, the United States ended direct contact with Russians involved in a campaign against ISIL, to which Russia suspended an agreement it had with the U.S. regarding the reduction of plutonium. In November 2016, then-National Security Advisor Susan Rice issued a warning to Syria and Russia regarding repeated bombings of hospitals. In February 2017, the Atlantic Council issued a report documenting Russian bombings of hospitals during the campaign to take Aleppo, which Russia has denied. The report also documented the use of chemical weapons by forces supporting the Syrian government.

Russia has denied claims that it has targeted hospitals.

In early June 2019, after more than 20 hospitals in Syria's north-west were targeted, dozens of prominent doctors – include Denis Mukwege, Peter Agre, Sarah Wollaston, Terence English, David Nott, and Zaher Sahloul – called for urgent action to halt the bombing campaign by Syrian and Russian planes, urging the UN to investigate the targeting of listed hospitals and asked the international community to put pressure on Russia and Syria to stop targeting medical centers and reverse funding cuts to surviving hospitals and clinics that were now overwhelmed by refugees. Dr Mohamed Zahid, from Physicians Across Continents, a medical organisation working in Syria, said that doctors working in rebel-held northern Syria will no longer share the locations of medical facilities with the United Nations after doing so failed to stop them being targeted by airstrikes. He said "last year six hospitals were attacked, and this month another eight hospitals were attacked after their coordinates were shared with the UN. So most NGOs in Syria decided to stop this process." The UN secretary-general, António Guterres, opened an investigation into the hospital bombings in August 2019.

In October 2019, Susannah Sirkin, director of policy at Physicians for Human Rights, said "the attacks on health in Syria, as well as the indiscriminate bombing of civilian facilities, are definitely war crimes, and they should be prosecuted at the level of the International Criminal Court in The Hague. But Russia and China 'shamefully' vetoed a Security Council resolution that would have referred those and other crimes in Syria to the court."

In May 2020, based on the evidence gathered, Amnesty International said the Russian-Syrian attacks on medical facilities and other civilian infrastructure were in violation of several international humanitarian laws, which summed up to "war crimes."

The UN Director at Human Rights Watch, Louis Charbonneau, warned: "If Russia thinks this will help them escape accountability for war crimes, they're dead wrong. We and other groups will continue to investigate and document the deliberate bombings of hospitals and other grave crimes in Syria."

== See also ==
- Airstrikes on hospitals in Yemen
- Attacks on health facilities during the Gaza war
- Kunduz hospital airstrike
- Russian war crimes
  - Russian strikes on hospitals during the Russian invasion of Ukraine
    - Mariupol hospital airstrike
