= Russian strikes on hospitals during the Russian invasion of Ukraine =

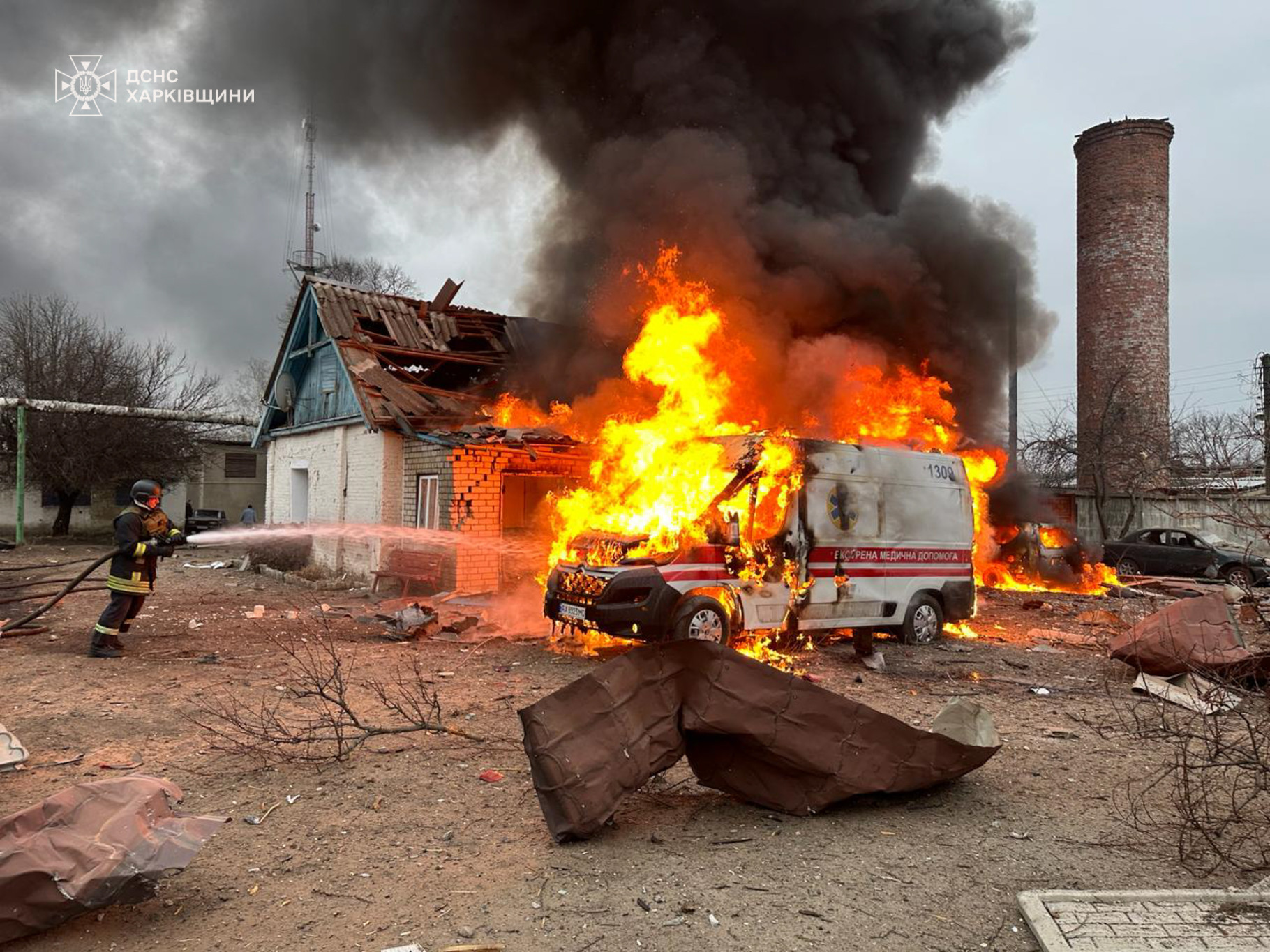
Ambulance on fire after a Russian strike on an emergency medical center in Zolochiv, 15 March 2024.

During the Russian invasion of Ukraine, the Russian air force has repeatedly struck Ukrainian medical facilities, hospitals, clinics, and ambulances, and health workers. The Ministry of Defense of the United Kingdom stated that Russia was prioritizing attacks on Ukrainian medical facilities as a method of warfare, often striking these, as well as power infrastructure with Iranian-made drones such as Shahed 131, Shahed 136.

== Latest figures ==
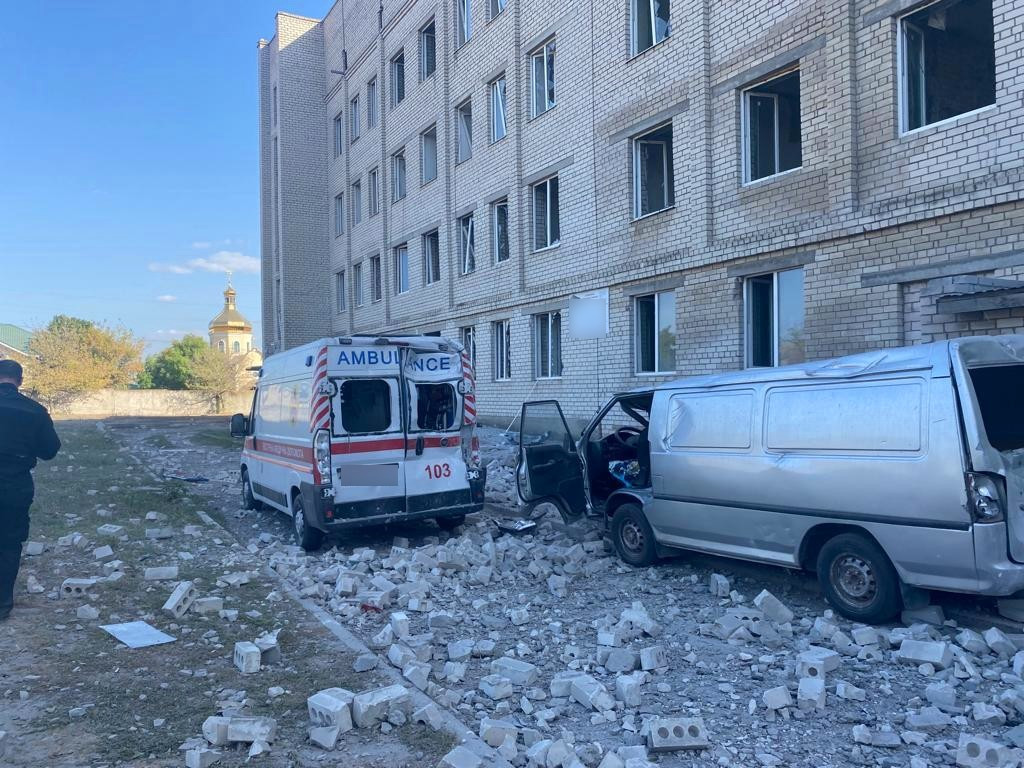
Hospital in Beryslav (Kherson region) after Russian shelling on 5 October 2023

As of 21 December 2023, the World Health Organization (WHO) reported 1,422 attacks on health care reported by their 'Surveillance System for Attacks on Health Care' (SSA) tool.

The WHO, in an article published on 22 February 2024, reported 1,574 verified attacks on health, and the deaths of 118 health-care workers, since the start of the full scale illegal invasion of Ukraine.

As of 4 April 2024, WHO verified 1682 attacks on health care in Ukraine, resulting in 128 deaths and 288 injuries of medical personnel and patients.

As of 10 July 2024 Physicians for Human Rights "Attacks on Health Care in Ukraine" website counted 1442 attacks on health care facilities, out of which 742 destroyed hospitals and clinics, killing 210 health workers.

On 8 July 2024, Human Rights Watch reported of 1,736 damaged or destroyed medical facilities.

== History of attacks ==
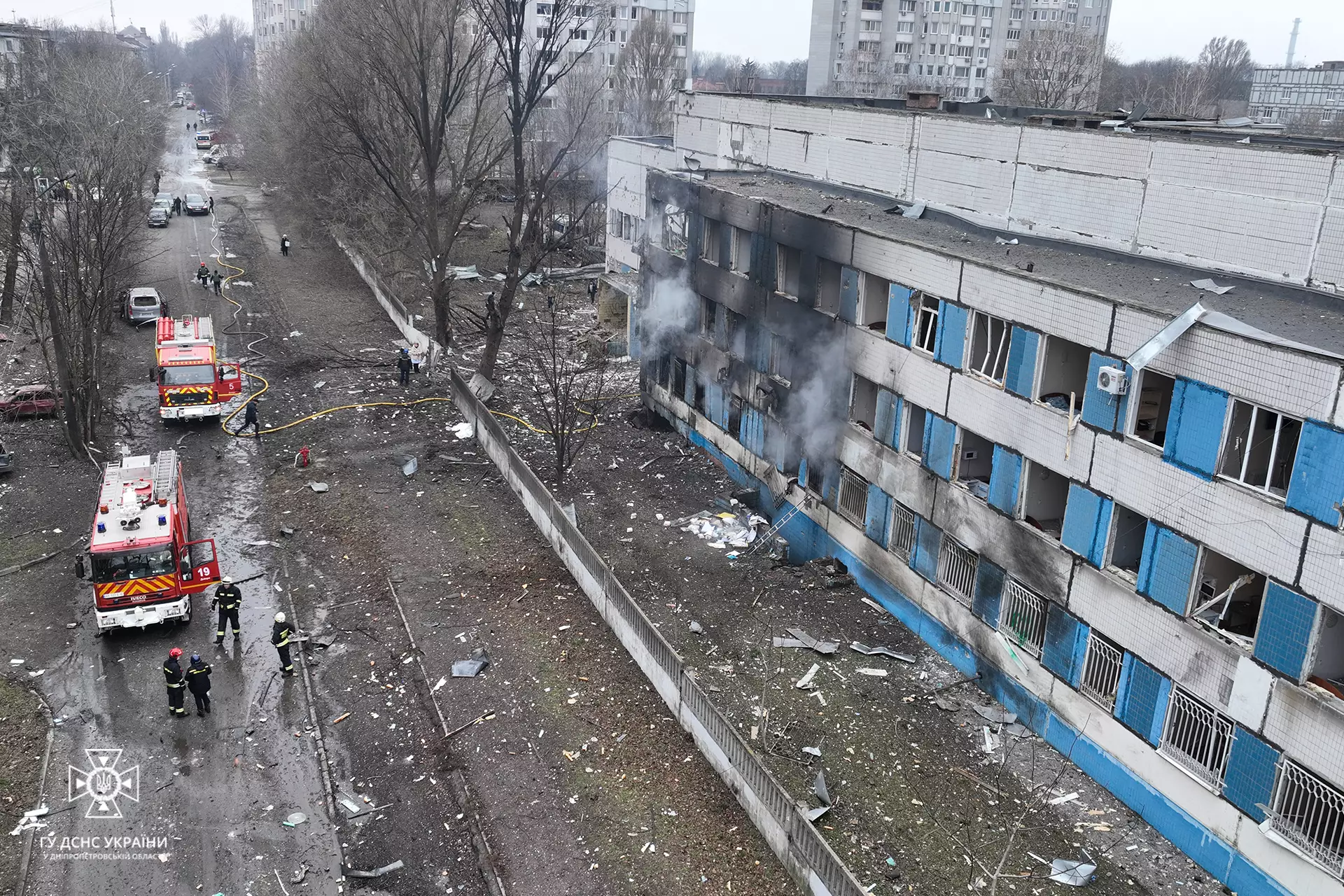
Maternity hospital in Dnipro after Russian missile attack on 29 December 2023

Russia has a history of employing systematic attacks on medical facilities as a tactic of war. Human rights organizations operating in Syria state that Russian Federation is deliberately using GPS coordinates handed over to them by the UN's deconfliction line as a list of targets. This became such a problem, that doctors refused to share their coordinates with the UN in an attempt to avoid Russian attacks. Eventually the Russian Federation left the UN program claiming it was in protest of the UN not sharing the list with their Syrian ally, who likewise, engaged in a campaign of attacks against healthcare facilities. Russian state media had been routinely justifying attacks on civilian objects, destruction of towns and inciting extermination of civilian population in Ukraine.

== Milestones ==
Between February 24 and March 21, 2022, sixty-four medical facilities and their personnel were targeted by Russian forces in Ukraine, the WHO reported.

By March 25, 2022, the facilities were being hit at rate of two to three a day. Mostly with heavy weapons.

By April 8, 2022, there were 91 attacks confirmed by the WHO, averaging 2 attacks on hospitals, ambulances or medical supply depots per day.

By November 21, 2022, there were at least 703 attacks on Ukrainian healthcare facilities with 144 such facilities completely destroyed by Russia.

By the end of 2022, nearly one in ten Ukrainian hospitals had been damaged.

The Centre for Information Resilience (CIR) found that Russia has "deliberately and repeated" targeted Kherson city's medical facilities between December 2022, and May 2023.

By May 30, 2023, the WHO had verified 1,000 attacks, the highest number ever recorded. Other monitoring groups have also marked the milestone 1000th attack, though using different metrics. Collectively this constitutes almost daily, deliberate instances of war crimes on a massive scale.

By February 22, 2024, the WHO regional direct confirmed that there had been "over 1500" attacks reported.

The UN reported 131 additional attacks on health infrastructure in their February 21, 2024, report. This seems to be since January 2024.

== Notable events ==
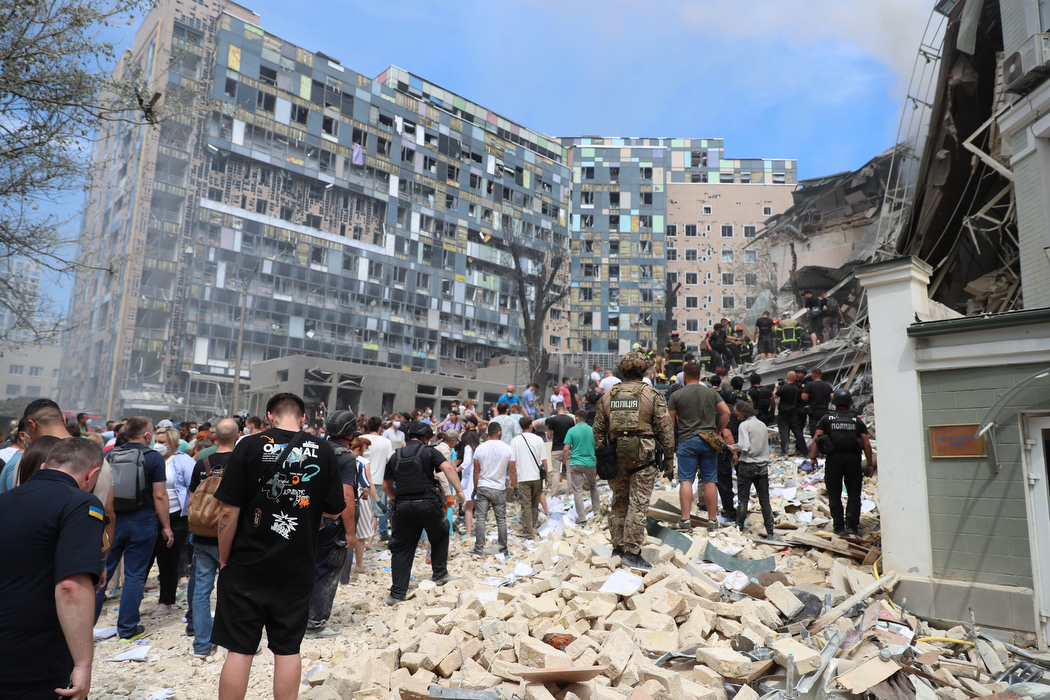
Okhmatdyt children's hospital in Kyiv after a Russian missile strike on 8 July 2024

A deadly attack occurred on the first day of the war, February 24, 2022, at the Central City Hospital in Vuhledar when a Russian ballistic missile full of cluster munitions fell just outside of the hospital, killing four and injuring ten.

The most widely covered attack was the bombing of the Mariupol maternity hospital.

On 23 November 2022, Russian missile strikes destroyed a maternity ward in Ukraine's Zaporizhzhia region, in the town of Vilnyansk, killing a newborn baby.

On July 8, 2024, Russian cruise missiles attacked children's hospitals in Kyiv and Dnipro.

== Analysis ==
The World Health Organization (WHO) reported that Ukraine accounted for 42% of all worldwide attacks on health care facilities in 2025.

== See also ==
- Russian–Syrian hospital bombing campaign
- War crimes in the Russian invasion of Ukraine
- Attacks on health facilities during the Gaza war
- Russian war crimes
- Russian war crimes during the Syrian civil war
- War crimes in the Syrian civil war
