= Josh Littlejohn =

Scottish philanthropist and homeless campaigner

Josh Littlejohn MBE
- Born: 16 September 1986 (age 40); Edinburgh, United Kingdom
- Citizenship: British
- Education: University of Edinburgh
- Occupations: Social Entrepreneur and Author

Josh Littlejohn MBE is a Scottish social entrepreneur, Sunday Times best selling author and homeless campaigner who founded charities the Social Bite and the World’s Big Sleep Out.

== Early life and education ==
Josh Littlejohn was born on 16 September 1986 in Edinburgh, United Kingdom. He has an honours degree in Politics and Economics from the University of Edinburgh.

== Career ==
In August 2012 Littlejohn co-founded the Social Bite, a chain of cafes that provides employment and free food to homeless and vulnerable people.

In 2018, Littlejohn built the Social Bite Village from reclaimed wasteland in Edinburgh to provide shelter and support for up to 20 homeless people at any one time. A second Village was built in Rutherglen, South Lanarkshire in 2026.

In December 2019, Littlejohn launched the World’s Big Sleep Out, which took place in 52 cities including London, New York, Delhi and Hong Kong.

He has appeared on The One Show and BBC Breakfast. Newspaper interviews include The New York Times, The Guardian and The Times.

In 2023 he published his first book Paying It Forward: How to Be a Social Entrepreneur. The book debuted at number seven on the Sunday Times Best Seller chart.

== Recognition ==
Littlejohn was appointed a Member of the Order of the British Empire (MBE) in the 2017 New Year Honours. He has received an honorary Doctor of Science in Social Science from the University of Edinburgh and honorary doctorates from Robert Gordon University, and Edinburgh Napier University,

He was included in the Debrett’s list of 500 most influential people in the UK 2017.

Littlejohn collected the Pride of Britain Special Recognition award in 2019.

In 2020, he won the Robert Burns Humanitarian Award for helping helpless people.

In 2023, his debut book 'Paying it Forward' became a Sunday Times' best seller, reaching number seven in the UK's best selling chart.
