= Okhmatdyt =

National specialized children's hospital Okhmatdyt

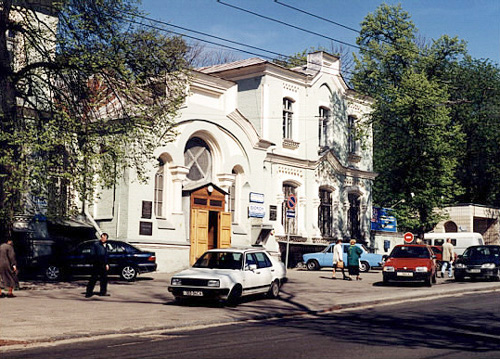

Geography
- Location: Ukraine

Links
- Website: ohmatdyt.com.ua
- Lists: Hospitals in Ukraine

National specialized children's hospital "Okhmatdyt" (Ukrainian: Охматдит, an acronym of охорона материнства та дитинства – protection of motherhood and childhood) is a multidisciplinary diagnostic and treatment facility in Kyiv, Ukraine, which provides specialized, highly qualified medical care to the children's population of Ukraine. It is the largest children's hospital in Ukraine.

== Main capabilities ==
Up to 18,000 children are treated in the hospital's 720 beds every year, and about 20,000 receive emergency care at the hospital's trauma center. The hospital performs about 7,000 operations annually. The departments perform all types of surgical interventions except cardiac surgery.

== History ==
=== Russian Empire ===
The history of the National Children's Specialized Hospital Okhmatdyt began in 1894 when the Kyiv Free Cesarevych Mykola Hospital for Laborers and the Poor was opened in Kyiv at the expense of the prominent businessman and philanthropist Mykola Tereshchenko.

In 1891, the Kyiv City Public Administration allocated a land plot along Kadetske Highway between the suburb of Shuliavka and the city barracks. The architect, academician Volodymyr Nikolaiev began developing a project for a future hospital with 50 beds. For the construction of the hospital's premises, Tereshchenko allocated 100 thousand rubles of his own capital and 15 thousand more to purchase the necessary property for the arrangement of the medical institution.

On 17 December 1893, in Gatchina, Emperor Alexander III approved the charter of the Kyiv Free Hospital for Laborers, named after Tsesarevich Nikolai.

=== Ukrainian Soviet Socialist Republic ===
After the revolutionary events of 1917, the hospital housed, in addition to therapeutic beds, a tuberculosis dispensary, a 30-bed maternity hospital, and a consultation center for mothers and pregnant women. The organization of healthcare in Kyiv at that time was handled by the District Health Inspectorate, which included the protection of motherhood and childhood inspection department, which dealt with maternal and child health care. The protection of motherhood and childhood infrastructure included children's hospitals in the city, milk kitchens, baby homes, and counseling centers. These medical institutions also trained medical students and nurses.

In October 1927, the health inspectorate sent a memo to the district executive committee, proposing to combine the disparate maternal and child healthcare institutions and create the OHMATDYT Institute. It was proposed that the institute be located in a hospital for the poor, where a maternity hospital, a women's consultation, and a children's tuberculosis clinic were already operating at the time. On 11 November 1927, the Collegium of the People's Commissariat of Health of Ukraine approved a resolution on the organization of the Institute for the Protection of Motherhood and Childhood in Kyiv, which was officially opened in March 1929. Since then, the hospital's development as a major children's medical institution has been closely linked to the institute's activities.

=== Post-dissolution of USSR ===
Since 1998, the Center for Pediatric Oncohematology and Bone Marrow Transplantation has been operating within the hospital's structure, providing state-of-the-art diagnostics and treatment of oncohematological diseases and bone marrow transplants to sick children. The center's active work on the study and adaptation of highly effective foreign technologies in treating childhood leukemia and lymphoma has increased the positive results of chemotherapy programs in the center's departments fivefold.

In 2002, the hospital began performing laparoscopic surgeries and surgical treatment of scoliosis using the Bridge system, as well as using bio-implants in newborn surgeries. The center has started accepting victims with polytrauma. In recent years, the number of sick children with complex surgical pathology from different regions of Ukraine has increased significantly, some of whom were operated on for the first time at their place of residence, according to the report.

In 2011, construction of new hospital buildings began.

In December 2017, the first stage of the renovated complex was put into operation.

In July 2020, the second phase of the new hospital building was opened.

==== Russian missile strike ====
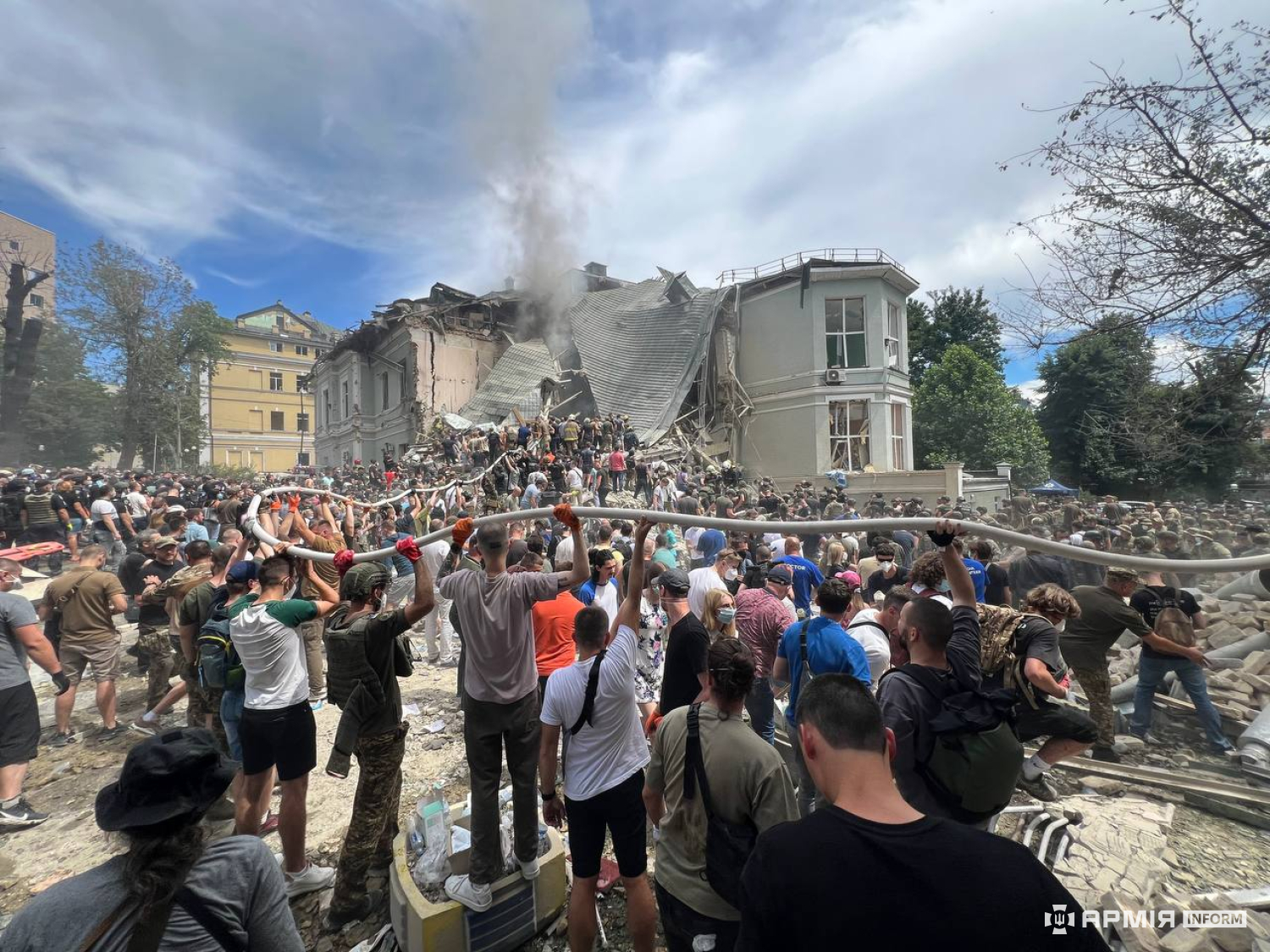
Damaged Okhmatdyt after a 2024 missile attack

On 8 July 2024, a massive missile attack on Ukraine occurred and the hospital's premises suffered from a Russian missile strike, where over 60% of the facility was destroyed.

The Toxicology building with the Chronic and Acute Intoxication Unit (where children undergo dialysis) of the Okhmatdyt National Children's Hospital was destroyed. In the new, recently opened building, 12 departments were damaged, including 8 surgical, 5 oncology, two intensive care units, an operating room, and a radiology and radiation therapy department. Part of the country's only oncohematology laboratory has also been destroyed. At the time of the missile attack, there were more than 600 patients and at least as many medical workers in Okhmatdyt. About 100 patients were transferred to other medical institutions in Kyiv: National Cancer Institute, Regional Cancer Center, Institute of Neurosurgery.

=== Reconstruction ===
The first reconstruction tender was cancelled due to complaints about the procurement process. No wrongdoing was found by the National Anti-Corruption Bureau of Ukraine, but a new public procurement process awarded the rebuilding responsibility to Riola-Module Ltd, Academ Bud and Arkon in June 2025.

The funding for the reconstruction came from The Howard G. Buffett Foundation, the Lithuanian government, United24 and Monobank.
