= David Nott =

Welsh consultant surgeon

David Nott OBE OStJ FRCS
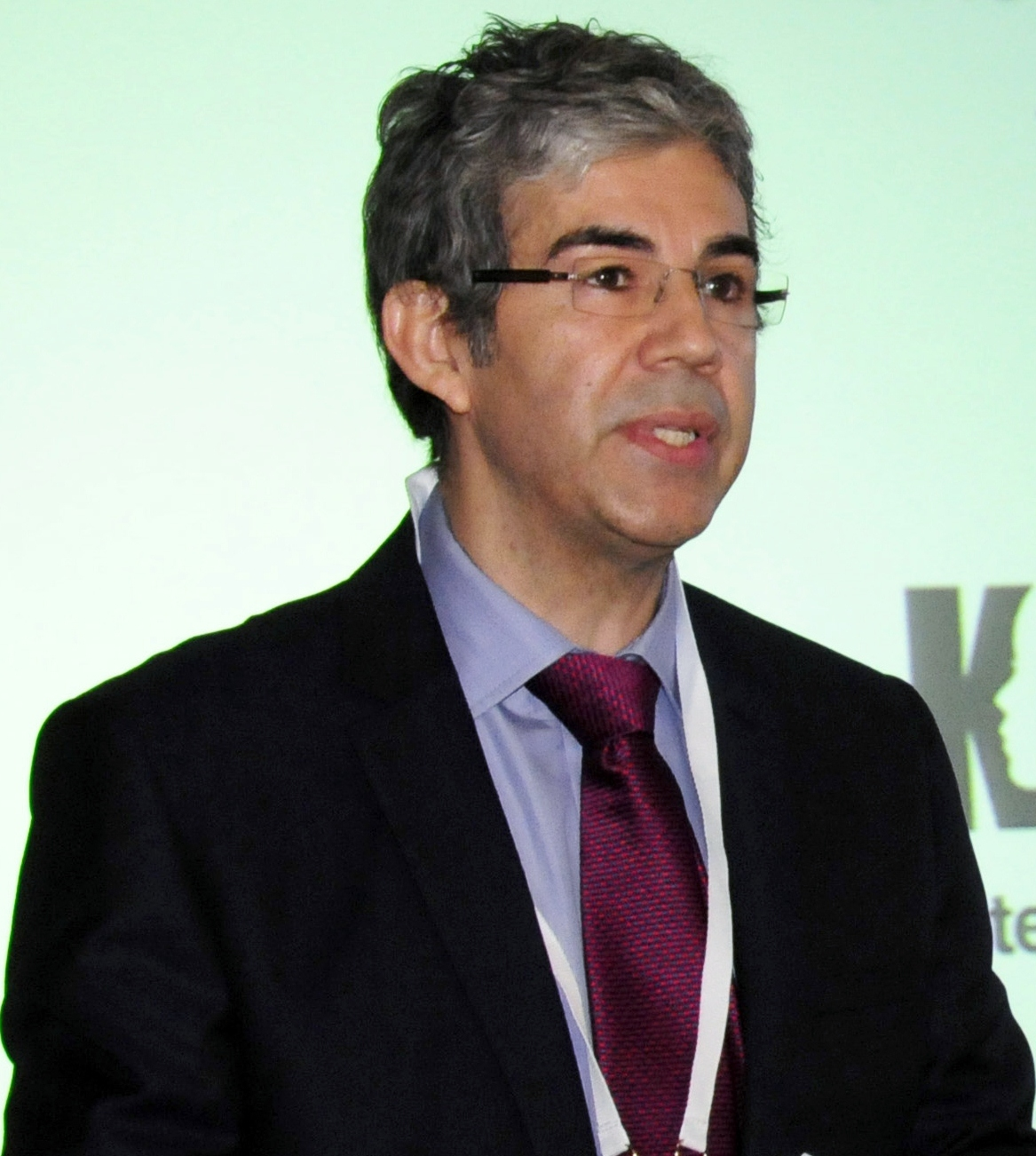
- Addressing the "Keep Her Safe" conference, November 2013
- Born: David Malcolm Nott; 1956 (age 69–70); Carmarthen, Wales
- Education: Hulme Grammar School, University of St Andrews, University of Manchester
- Known for: Working as a volunteer surgeon in war zones
- Medical career
- Profession: Surgeon
- Institutions: Charing Cross; Chelsea and Westminster; St Mary's; Royal Marsden
- Sub-specialties: General surgery, vascular surgery
- Awards: Robert Burns Humanitarian Award (2016)

David Malcolm Nott OBE OStJ FRCS (born 1956) is a Welsh consultant surgeon who mainly works in London hospitals as a general and vascular surgeon, but also volunteers to work in disaster and war zones. Having recognised that training others could greatly increase his capacity to help, Nott established the David Nott Foundation, along with his wife, to organise training in emergency surgery for others working in war and disaster zones. He has been honoured for this work, and has been called the "Indiana Jones of surgery".

== Education and family ==
Nott was born in Carmarthen in 1956 and lived with his grandparents at Trelech, near Carmarthen, until the age of four. He then lived in the Midlands and Rochdale from where he attended Hulme Grammar School. His father, Malcolm George Nott, was born in Burma and educated in Madras, India, and was half-Indian and half-Burmese. He was an orthopaedic and trauma surgeon, specialising in hip replacement; his mother, born Yvonne Jones, was a nurse from Wales. His father encouraged Nott to follow him into a medical career, and also inspired his son's later war work by taking him to see the 1984 film The Killing Fields.

Nott was not successful at school initially but, after resitting his A-Levels, he studied medicine at the universities of St Andrews and Manchester, graduating in 1981.

As a child, often left on his own, Nott was fascinated with building model aircraft and later learned to fly, gaining both a private pilot licence and a commercial pilot licence. He became an air transport pilot and flew for Hamlin Jet in Luton, as a side job, for about ten years.

== Surgery ==
During his medical training in Manchester and Liverpool, he was attracted to surgery. He took a special interest in vascular surgery after watching a Liverpool surgeon, Peter Harris, save someone by operating on their ruptured aortic aneurysm. He combined this with general surgery, practising at London hospitals including Charing Cross, Chelsea and Westminster, St Mary's and the Royal Marsden. As a vascular surgeon, he specialises in keyhole techniques, especially for repairs of abdominal aortic aneurysms, and distal arterial bypasses. In 1999, he was the first surgeon in the world to perform a femoral-popliteal bypass using only laparoscopic techniques. His other work includes appendectomies; hernia repairs; removal of lipomas and haemorrhoids; and treatment of varicose veins using ligation or sclerotherapy.

He began working in disaster and war zones in 1993, when he saw footage of the war in Sarajevo. He has worked in disaster and war zones for several weeks each year since then, working as a volunteer surgeon for agencies such as Médecins Sans Frontières and the Red Cross. He has also served in a similar capacity for the Royal Auxiliary Air Force, where he holds the rank of wing commander.

The locations of his work have included Afghanistan, Bosnia, Chad, Darfur, Gaza, Haiti, Iraq, Libya, Sierra Leone and opposition-held areas of Syria. Between 2013 and 2014 Nott trained and assisted medical students and other doctors to conduct trauma surgeries in opposition-held East Aleppo.

During the 2022 Russian invasion of Ukraine, he visited Ukraine to train surgeons, in conjunction with UOSSM International.

== David Nott Foundation ==
On a mission to Libya, Nott began to realise that many of the medical staff there were not trained for the kinds of traumatic injuries they were encountering. He began running a Definitive Surgical Trauma Skills workshop for his colleagues in the hospital. This experience, in part, led to Nott setting up the David Nott Foundation in 2015, along with his wife Elly, who led the charity as Chief Executive until 2019. The foundation is aimed at assisting with the training of surgeons for areas of conflict.

The David Nott Foundation provides surgical training for doctors and nurses who work in war and disaster zones. The training courses focus on life-saving surgical procedures for austere environments, with doctors given the opportunity to practice on real bodies, supported by other resources, including videos and anatomical models. The courses are run with the Royal College of Surgeons for five days every six months and are funded by the foundation through a scholarship scheme for surgeons working in hostile conditions.

These courses are also delivered on the front line, where doctors are unable to leave their posts, and have been held in Yemen, Libya and Iraq, among others. The front line Hostile Environment Surgical Training courses (HEST) last for four days. They focus on a wide range of skills, including treating gun shot wounds and carrying out vascular surgery, with the help of a full-body simulator. The simulator is an accurate model of the human body and can be used to demonstrate various procedures.

In 2022, the foundation provided surgical training for areas of conflict in Ukraine, during the Russian invasion of Ukraine.

== Honours and awards ==
Nott was admitted as a fellow to the Royal College of Surgeons in 1989. He was appointed an Officer of the Order of the British Empire (OBE) in the 2012 Birthday Honours. In 2016 he received the Robert Burns Humanitarian Award and the Pride of Britain Award. He received honorary degrees from the University of Salford in 2015, from the University of St Andrews in 2017, and was given an honorary doctorate by the University of Wales Trinity Saint David in July 2017. Nott was shortlisted for the RSL Christopher Bland Prize for his book War Doctor in 2020.

== Personal life ==
In 2015 Nott, then 58, married Eleanor Jupp, then 32. They have a daughter. His wife worked for the Institute of Strategic Studies before taking on her role with the foundation.

In 2014 he had lunch with the Queen. When he found it difficult to speak about his traumatic experiences, she put him at ease by inviting him to take twenty minutes (and some dog biscuits) to befriend her corgis. In 2016 Nott appeared on BBC Radio 4's Desert Island Discs. Also in 2016 he spoke of his Christian faith on BBC1's Victoria Derbyshire. In 2020 he appeared in Christmas University Challenge in the Manchester team.

== Publications ==
- Conflict and Catastrophe Medicine: A Practical Guide, Springer, 2014, ISBN 9781447129271
- War Doctor: Surgery on the Front Line, Picador, 2019, ISBN 9781509837038 In February 2019, War Doctor was BBC Radio 4's Book of the Week.
