= Union of Medical Care and Relief Organizations =

Syrian healthcare charity

- Union des Organisations de Secours et Soins Médicaux
- Abbreviation: UOSSM
- Formation: 2012
- Type: NGO
- Purpose: Humanitarian Healthcare
- International Chair: Ghanem Tayara
- Website: https://www.uossm.org/

The Union of Medical Care and Relief Organizations (usually known by the acronym of their French name Union des Organisations de Secours et Soins Médicaux, UOSSM) is a humanitarian non-governmental organization that provides healthcare in Canada, Palestine, Syria, Jordan, Lebanon, Bangladesh, Morocco, Libya, Turkiye, Yeman, Mozambique, and Pakistan.

== History ==
UOSSM was founded by group of expatriate Syrian doctors in 2012 and later grew into an international organization. As of 2015, it had an annual budget of USD$18 million.

UOSSM has offices in eight countries, including USA, Canada, and France.

== Medical activities ==
UOSSM provide free medical care and equipment to 113 Syrian healthcare facilities. Services provided by UOSSM include primary health care, pediatrics, gynecology and reproductive health services, general and internal medicine, nutrition, community health, pharmacy, vaccinations, and intensive care.

Four UOSSM hospitals use telemedicine. Since 2016, the organization has used 480 solar panels to partly (30% to 40%) power a hospital, as well as an electric vehicle to deliver vaccines.

== Advocacy ==
In 2020, UOSSM called for more international support for healthcare organizations in Syria, and reported on COVID-19 cases overwhelming hospital facilities.

In 2017 and 2018, the organization shared news of chemical gas attacks in Syria.

In 2018, UOSSM called for the international community to provide food aid and shelter to Syrians.

== Hospital attacks ==
In 2016, four UOSSM staff were killed in Aleppo when airstrikes hit two ambulances.

Eighty-five of their hospitals were attacked in 2020. They have blamed Russian and Syrian government forces for attacks.

== Key people ==
- Ghanem Tayara MD, Chair, UOSSM International
- Anas Al-Kassem MD, Founder, UOSSM Canada
- Ziad Alissa MD, director of UOSSM France

== See also ==
- Use of chemical weapons in the Syrian civil war
- Russian–Syrian hospital bombing campaign
