= Robert Burns Humanitarian Award =

- Awarded for: Humanitarian service
- Country: Scotland
- Presented by: EventScotland
- First award: 2002
- Website: http://www.robertburnsaward.com/

The Robert Burns Humanitarian Award is an award presented annually around the time of Robert Burns' birthday to a group or individual who has saved, improved or enriched the lives of others or society as a whole, through self-sacrifice, selfless service, hands-on charitable or volunteer work, or other acts.

The winner receives a 1759 guinea, which signifies the year of the bard's birth and the coinage then in circulation, and a specially commissioned award handcrafted in Scotland.

The judging panel is chaired by David Anderson, chief executive of South Ayrshire Council, and includes journalist and broadcaster Kaye Adams; actor, writer and painter John Cairney; Nat Edwards, director of the Robert Burns Birthplace Museum; Habib Malik, former RBHA winner and head of Islamic Relief Scotland; Robert Stewart, president of the Robert Burns World Federation; Guy Willoughby, former RBHA winner and chief executive of the HALO Trust; and Rob Woodward, chief executive of STV.

== Award recipients ==
- 2002: John E. Sulston
- 2003: Yitzhak Frankenthal
- 2004: Clive Stafford Smith
- 2005: Pius Ncube
- 2006: Marla Ruzicka
- 2007: Adi Roche
- 2008: Jonathan Kaplan
- 2009: Guy Willoughby
- 2010: Habib Malik
- 2011: Linda Norgrove
- 2012: Karen Graham
- 2013: Khalil Dale
- 2015: Olivia Giles OBE
- 2016: David Nott
- 2017: Marcelline Budza
- 2018: Anna Ferrer
- 2019: Jasvinder Sanghera
- 2020: Josh Littlejohn
- 2021: Mark Williamson
- 2022: Digambar Narzary
- 2023: Renuka Ramakrishnan
- 2024 Gail Penfold

From 2014, a new young persons' element was introduced: the Robert Burns Humanitarian Medal, for people aged 16-25 years from anywhere in the world.
