= Attacks on health facilities during the Gaza war =

Israel's bombing campaign against Gaza health facilities

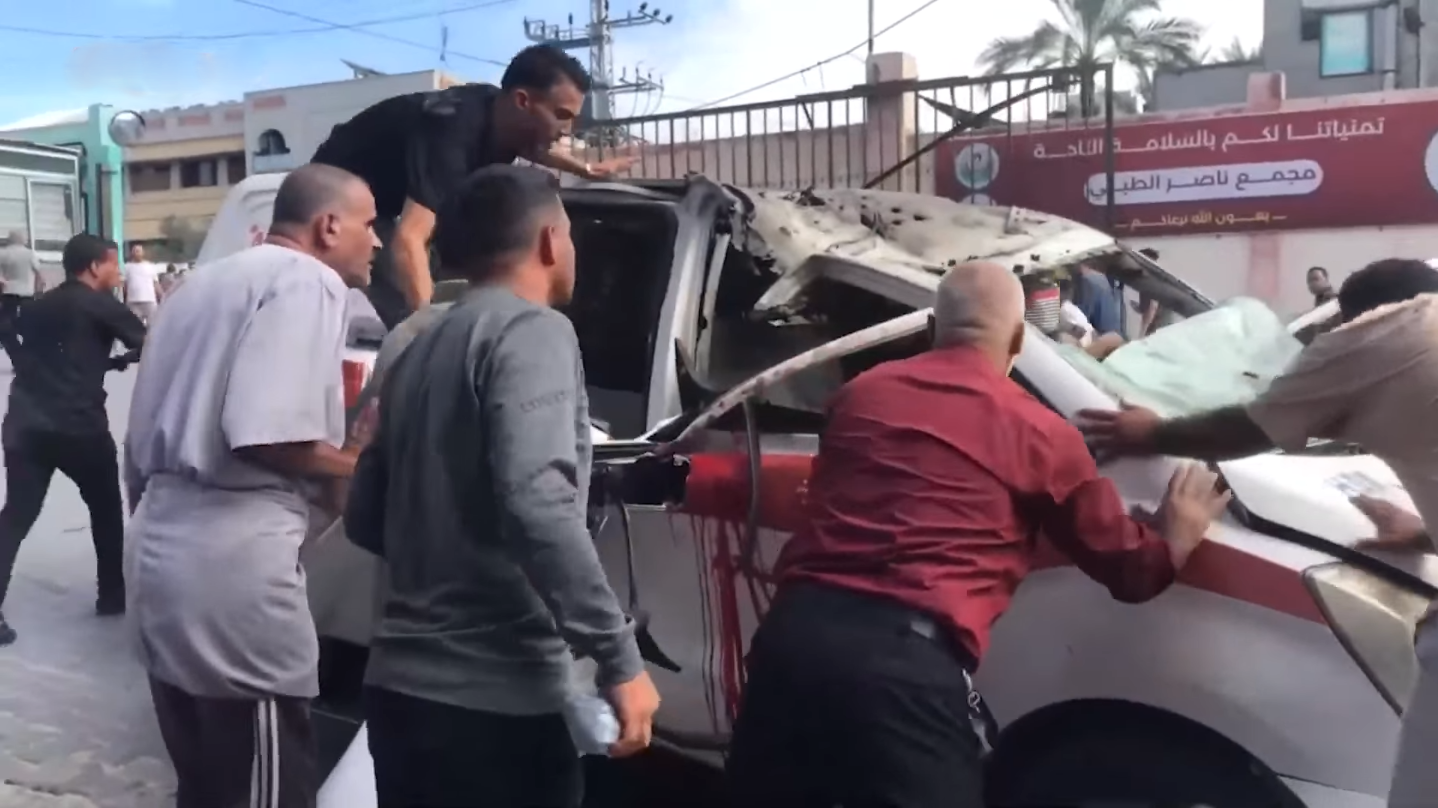
Palestine Red Crescent Society ambulance hit by an Israeli airstrike in Khan Yunis on 7 October 2023.

A significant number of attacks on healthcare facilities occurred during the Gaza war and genocide. During the first week of the war, there were 94 attacks on health care facilities in Israel and Gaza, killing 29 healthcare workers and injuring 24. The attacks on healthcare facilities contributed to a severe humanitarian crisis in Gaza. By 30 November, the World Health Organization documented 427 attacks on healthcare in the West Bank and Gaza Strip, resulting in 566 fatalities and 758 injuries. By February 2024, it was reported that "every hospital in Gaza is either damaged, destroyed, or out of service due to lack of fuel." By April, WHO had verified 906 attacks on healthcare in Gaza, the West Bank, Israel, and Lebanon. As of October 2026, the WHO reported 2,137 attacks on health care facilities in the Gaza Strip and the West Bank, resulting in the 1,052 deaths, 1,947 injuries, and damage to 1,214 ambulances.

Each side has been accused of committing war crimes in their attacks. CNN quoted the ICRC saying that "hospitals are given special protection under international humanitarian law in a time of war, but if militants store weapons there, or use them as a base of fire, then that protection falls away". Human Rights Watch stated, "The Israeli government has put forward no evidence that would justify stripping hospitals of their special protections." In December 2024, Andrew Cayley of the International Criminal Court said that Israeli claims about Hamas use of hospitals are "grossly exaggerated". On 13 March 2025, a United Nations investigation concluded that Israel has committed genocidal acts in Gaza by systematically destroying its reproductive healthcare facilities.

== Background ==
Israel is alleged to have broken medical neutrality, a war crime under the Geneva Conventions. According to Gaza officials, the IDF deliberately targeted ambulances and health facilities with airstrikes. In a statement, the Palestine Red Crescent demanded "accountability for this war crime." The International Federation of Red Cross and Red Crescent Societies, UNRWA, and Medecins Sans Frontieres (MSF) reported the deaths of their medical personnel.

The Physicians for Human Rights organization stated that a prominent aspect of the October 7 attacks, was the assault on medical personnel and facilities, during which emergency teams were prevented from reaching the wounded, while some of those attempting to provide care were killed. They also stated that the crimes of those who knowingly murdered them must not be diminished.

The World Health Organization (WHO) reported in December 2023 that there have been 164 attacks against healthcare in Palestine—in the Gaza Strip—since 7 October 2023. As a result of those attacks, 198 Palestinian medical staff, 12 members of the Palestinian Civil Defense, and 103 UNRWA staff have been killed. At the time of the report, 26 hospitals and 52 healthcare centers in Gaza were out of service, with 55 ambulances damaged.

The WHO has provided an updated report that states between 7 October 2023 and 19 September 2024, there have been 492 attacks on healthcare in Gaza with 492 individuals killed. No hospital in Gaza is fully functioning, only 17 of 36 hospitals are partially functioning and the remaining 19 are out of service. In May 2024, The Washington Post reported that only 4 of the 36 hospitals in Gaza have not been damaged by munitions, raided by Israeli forces, or ceased operations.

== Casualties ==
In Gaza, as of 9 October 2023, 12 of 35 hospitals were partially functioning, and 51 of 72 primary medical care facilities are closed. As of April 2025, 374 medical personnel had been killed in Gaza, and about 120 ambulances have been completely destroyed.

As of October 2026, the WHO reported 2,137 attacks on health care facilities in the Gaza Strip and the West Bank. In the Gaza Strip, attacks have resulted in 1,010 deaths, 1,724 injuries, 324 detained health workers, 70 detained patients, and 459 ambulances damaged. In the West Bank, attacks have resulted in 42 deaths, 223 injuries, 330 detained health workers, 54 detained patients, and 755 ambulances damaged.

== Attacks in Israel ==
=== Attacks on ambulances and medical crews ===
Israel's national emergency service reported three employees were killed, four volunteers remain injured, nine ambulances were put out of use due to gunshot and fire damage on the October 7 attacks, and a patient was shot inside an ambulance. Director General of the service said that paramedics' bodies were found with their medical gloves still on, and claimed that Hamas had killed them in the midst of treating the wounded; ambulance drivers were killed while sitting in the drivers' seats, and ambulances were intentionally torched and blown up by Hamas militants to prevent any attempt to save potential victims. Several people that were hiding in an abandoned ambulance were killed when it was bombed by Hamas gunmen at the Nova music festival massacre. A Battalion Aid Station team took cover under an armored vehicle due to AK-47 fire on them from the front and from its right side, while they were providing medical care, near Sufa.

=== Medical helicopter hit by rocket debris ===
On 7 October 2023, an ambulance helicopter was transporting three critically wounded people while rockets were flying overhead. Debris hit its rotors. The helicopter lost its balance and started the helicopter spinning. No casualties were reported.

=== Be'eri Clinic ===
During Be'eri massacre on 7 October 2023, the local dental clinic became the site of a standoff between attacking militants and the kibbutz's security teams. Militants eventually stormed the clinic, reportedly killing all of the staff and patients.

=== Barzilai Hospital ===
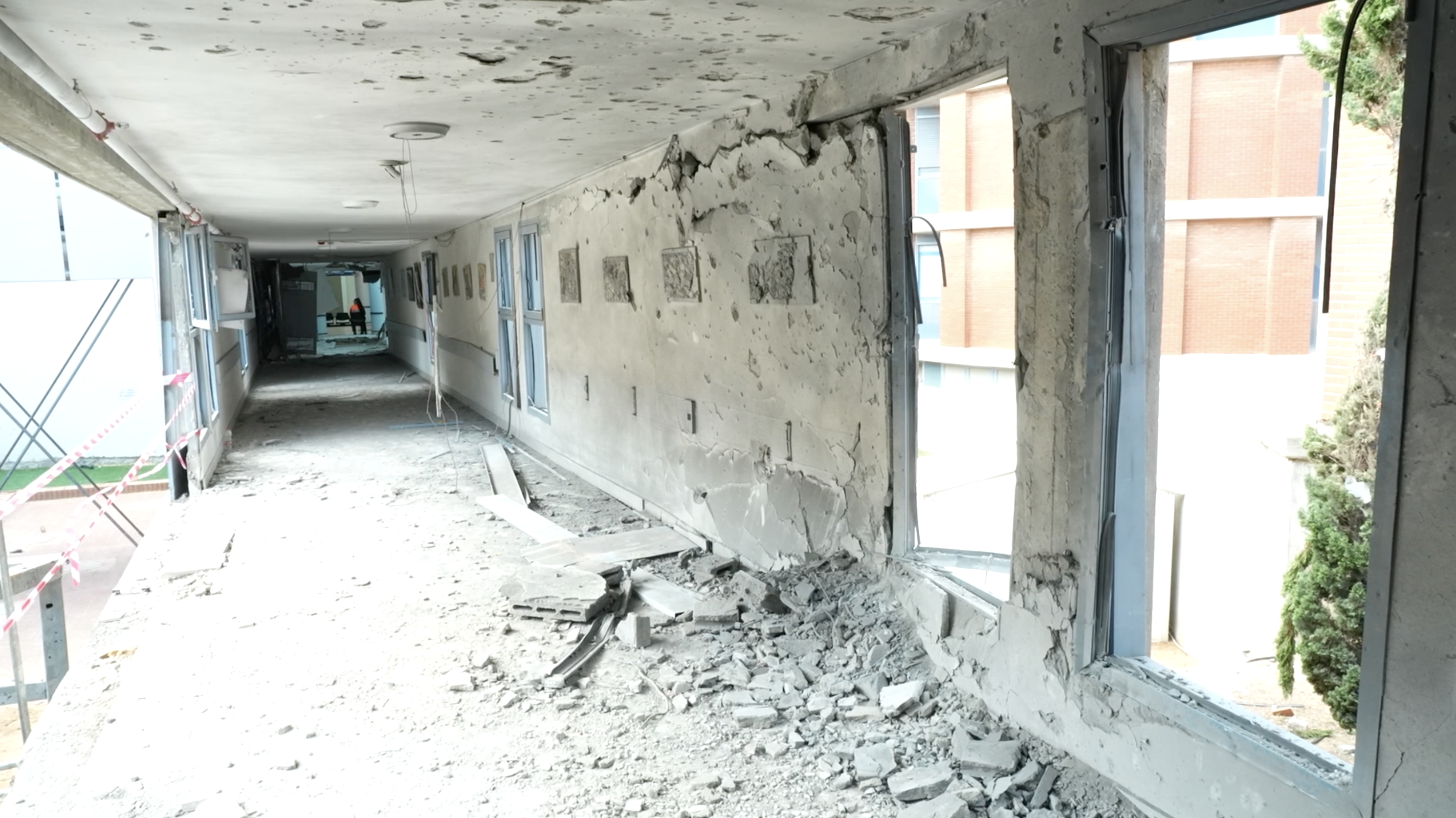
Aftermath of a Hamas rocket hit on the maternity ward of Barzilai Medical Center, on 8 October 2023

Barzilai Hospital in Ashkelon suffered 3 direct rocket strikes: with one rocket striking a bridge between buildings at the hospital and another hitting the childcare clinic.

=== Soroka Medical Center ===
Soroka Medical Center in Beer Sheba was used as the main hub for treating the injured during the initial attacks on 7 October. According to the head of the hospital, Shlomi Codish, while the medical personnel were treating the patients, there were repeated rocket attacks on the area, of which 18 landed in the area around the hospital.

=== Sheba Medical Center ===
On 21 October 2023, a cyber attack against Sheba Medical Center occurred. Israel's Ministry of Health instructed several hospitals to temporarily disconnect from the internet amid fears of a cyberattack.

== Attacks in Lebanon ==
=== Meiss Ej Jabal Hospital ===
On 10 November, the IDF shelled Meiss Ej Jabal Hospital which injured a doctor. The Lebanese health ministry condemned the attack, saying that “Israeli authorities were fully responsible for this unjustifiable act, which would have led to catastrophic results", and called for an investigation.

=== Hanin Hospital ===
On 11 January 2024, the IDF conducted strikes in the town of Hanine and targeted an emergency center affiliated with the Hezbollah-backed Islamic Health Committee. The attack killed two workers from the rescue force and destroyed an ambulance.

== Attacks in the West Bank ==
=== Jenin Governmental Hospital ===
Israeli forces fired shots and tear gas on 29 January 2024, damaging the hospital's maternity ward.

=== Khalil Suleiman hospital ===
A 17-year-old was shot and killed by IDF forces inside the Khalil Suleiman hospital compound near the Jenin refugee camp, according to accounts by Doctors Without Borders.

=== Assassination of alleged militants asleep in hospital ===
Israeli forces disguised as medical staff and civilian Muslim women have shot dead three Palestinians inside a hospital in the West Bank city of Jenin. The UN described them as extrajudicial executions. The hospital says the men were ‘assassinated’. Israel says they belonged to a ‘Hamas terrorist cell’. The BBC referred to the men who were killed as "members of Palestinian armed groups". The spokesperson for the hospital, Tawfiq al-Shobaki, said there was no exchange of fire in the hospital, just the assassination of a patient. He also said that all three men who died were asleep at the time of the attack.

== Attacks in the Gaza Strip ==
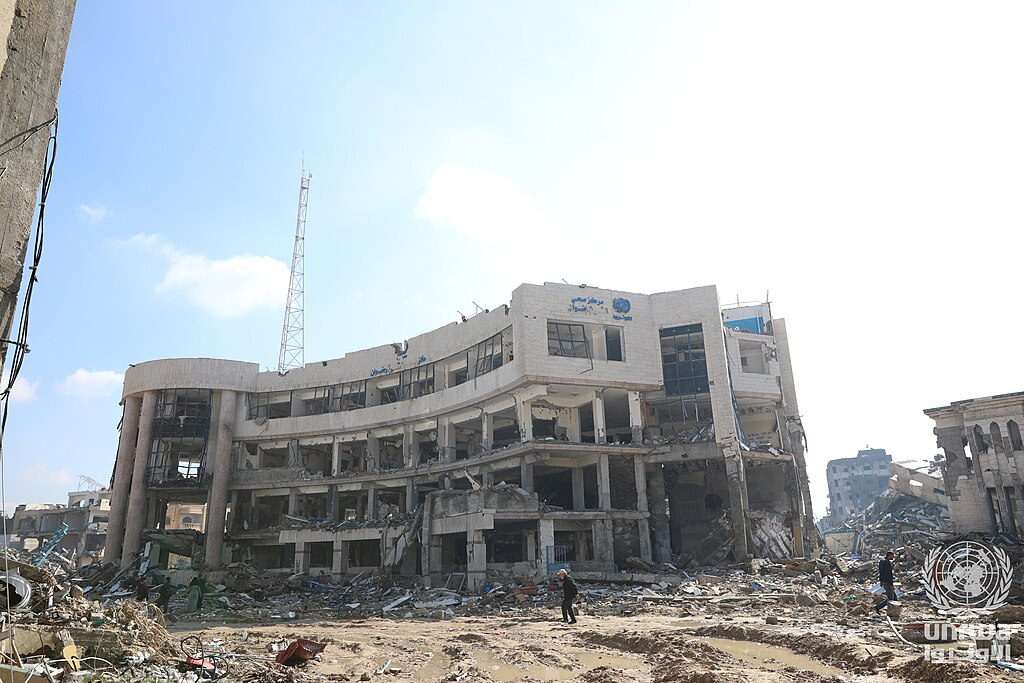
Israeli destruction of UNRWA el-Sheikh Radwan health center, February 2024

On 12 October 2023, the ICRC stated: "Hospitals in Gaza risk turning into morgues". On 15 October 2023, WHO data showed there had been 48 reported attacks on healthcare facilities in the Gaza Strip, resulting in damage to approximately 24 hospitals and healthcare facilities, including six hospitals. According to the World Health Organization, at least 521 people, including 16 medical workers, had been killed in 137 "attacks on health care" in Gaza by 12 November. By 14 November 2023, only one hospital was still operating in the north of Gaza. On 7 February 2024, the UN stated that only 4 of its 22 health facilities in Gaza remained operational.

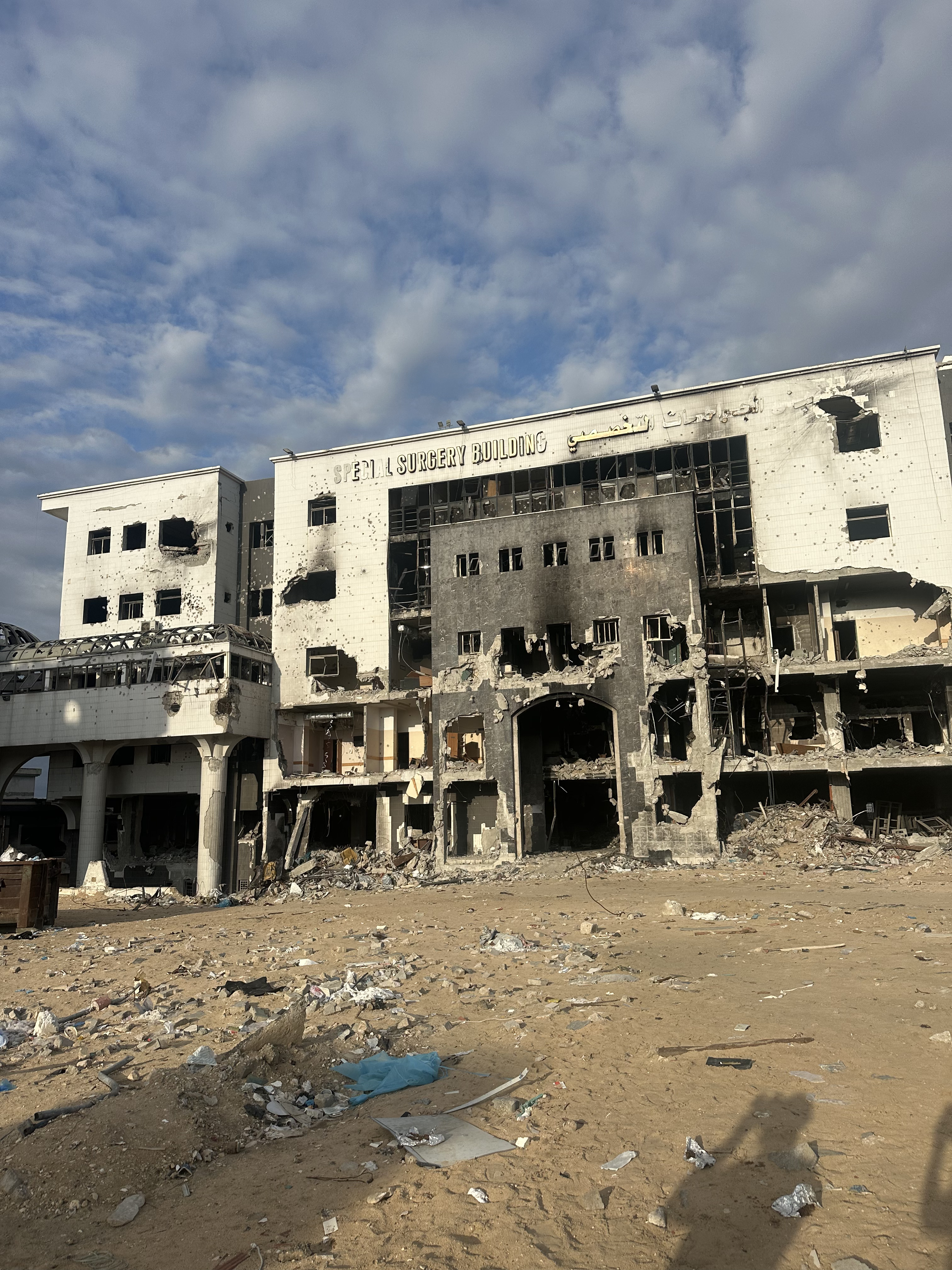
Al-Shifa Hospital in Gaza City, destroyed by Israeli bombing, December 21, 2024

The IDF accused Hamas of military operations inside hospitals, including alleged attacks on IDF soldiers, weapon storage, fighters taking shelter, providing support for Hamas tunnels, human shielding, and holding hostages Many of these claims, however, have been debunked under scrutiny from journalists. According to The Guardian: "It's almost impossible to refute every accusation that has been made, but it's clear the intended and actual result of this campaign has been the systematic destruction of the healthcare infrastructure for Palestinians in Gaza". In December 2024, Andrew Cayley, leading the International Criminal Court investigation in Palestine said that Israeli claims about Hamas use of hospitals in Gaza used to justify Israeli attacks on them are "grossly exaggerated".

Doctors Without Borders stated Israel had shown "complete disregard for the protection and safety of medical and humanitarian missions and their staff". As of October 2024, the World Health Organization stated it had verified 516 attacks on healthcare in the Gaza Strip since October 2023.

On 13 March 2025, a United Nations investigation concluded that Israel has committed genocidal acts in Gaza by systematically destroying its reproductive healthcare facilities while at the same time imposing a siege preventing necessary medications for deliveries, pregnancies and neonatal care, causing an "irreversible" harm to the reproductive prospects of Palestinians in Gaza. The investigation said the destruction "was a measure intended to prevent births among Palestinians in Gaza, which is a genocidal act".

On the same day, Israel bombed the Gaza European Hospital, killing Hamas leader Muhammed Sinwar and his companions who were holding a meeting in a bunker. Sources from Gaza-based factions reported that "the location did in fact contain a tunnel system".

=== Al-Ahli Arab Hospital ===
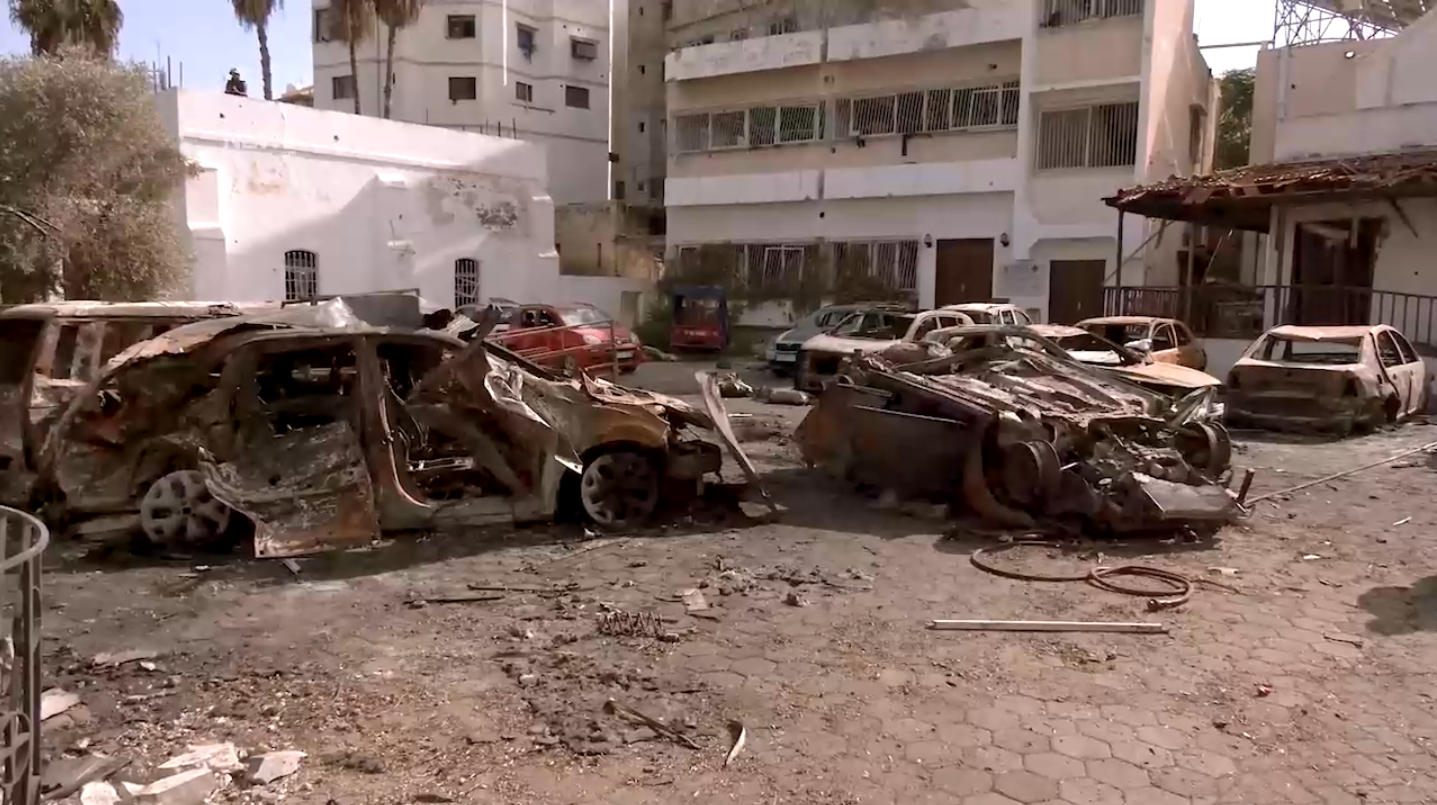
Aftermath of the Al-Ahli Arab hospital explosion, 18 October 2023

On 14 October 2023, according to a statement by the Archbishop of Canterbury, Justin Welby, an Israeli rocket had damaged the upper two floors of the hospital's cancer treatment center, which contained the ultrasound and mammography wards, and injured four staff members.

On 17 October 2023, an explosion took place in the parking lot of the courtyard of al-Ahli Arab Hospital in Gaza City during the war, resulting in a large number of fatalities and injuries among displaced Palestinians seeking shelter there.

Initial report suggested that an errant rocket launched from within Gaza hitting a parking lot near a hospital was the most probable cause. However, investigations from Channel 4 News, Le Monde, and The New York Times called this explanation into question and showed that multiple videos used as evidence were unlikely to depict the supposed rocket or even the attack itself. In its investigation on 20 October 2023, Forensic Architecture concluded that the blast was the result of a "munition fired from the direction of Israel", and in subsequent visual investigations published on 15 February 2024 and 17 October 2024, with the latter including situated testimony from doctors, it cast further doubt on the errant rocket launch theory.

On 18 December 2023, the al-Ahli Arab Hospital was attacked by Israeli soldiers, with displaced people forced out and two doctors arrested. The following day, the al-Ahli Hospital director stated Israeli troops arrested doctors, patients, and medical staff, partially destroyed the building's grounds, leaving the hospital unable to receive patients. Four people from the 18 December attacks on the hospital died.

On 13 April 2025, Israel bombed a part of the hospital, taking out its emergency department.

=== Al-Shifa Hospital siege ===
Al-Shifa Hospital was under siege and bombing during the war. The hospital has been completely cut off from the rest of Gaza City, trapping 15,000 people who are either patients in need of treatment or have taken refuge in the hospital grounds. Israel claims it is used as a military base by Hamas, a claim that Hamas denies. Analysis from BBC, The Independent, and The Washington Post found Israel's claims of a Hamas base at al-Shifa to be "unconvincing". But later examination by The New York Times suggest Hamas did store weapons and took cover at the hospital, using tunnels 213 meters long, twice the size previously known. The tunnels included bunkers, living areas, and computer and communications rooms, and established documents showed that Hamas masked its activities using the hospital. The Times also verified that the tunnel was under the surgery center. The analysis confirmed that "The Israeli military, however, has struggled to prove that Hamas maintained a command-and-control center under the facility. Critics of the Israeli military say the evidence does not support its early claims, noting that it had distributed material before the raid showing five underground complexes and also had said the tunnel network could be reached from wards inside a hospital building." In November 2023 the tunnels were destroyed by IDF while humanitarian activities continued in the hospital without interruption.

On 4 February 2024, Israeli surveillance and quadcopter drones fired on people sheltering inside the hospital.

=== Indonesian Hospital ===
On 20 November 2023, as part of the Israeli invasion of the Gaza Strip, the IDF completely surrounded and besieged the hospital. A report by Al-Haq found that the Indonesia Hospital had been the one targeted most persistently by the IDF. In June 2024, footage showed Israeli forces had destroyed the Noura al-Kaabi specialised dialysis centre at the Indonesian Hospital. On 18 May 2025, the hospital was attacked by Israeli drones.

=== Al-Quds Hospital ===
The Palestinian Red Crescent reported that Al-Quds Hospital in Gaza City was warned by IDF to immediately evacuate. The World Health Organization has expressed its deep concern over the report. On 19 January 2024, the Palestinian Red Crescent reported they were working to clean and repair Al-Quds after it sustained damage from Israeli attacks, stating, "The hospital suffered a fire, and a destruction of all its medical equipments and contents." On 9 February, Palestine Red Crescent Society stated the hospital had sustained severe damage from strikes by Israeli tanks.

=== Al-Amal Hospital ===
==== January 2024 ====
On 26 January 2024, snipers were reported around the vicinity of the hospital. Two brothers were shot by the snipers despite carrying a white flag. A 28-year-old was reportedly killed in the hospital compound on 28 January. Three people were killed and four injured on 29 January when they tried to move the body of a woman from the hospital. On 30 January, the Palestinian Red Crescent reported that IDF tanks had raided the yard at al-Amal Hospital, forced displaced people to evacuate immediately. On 31 January, the Palestinian Red Crescent reported Israeli forces had raided the hospital square and were firing heavily. Satellite analysis showed extensive damage to the area around the hospital, and 20 Israeli army vehicles located 500 metres (1,640 feet) west of the hospital building. Israeli forces again raided the hospital on 31 January, and a quadcopters shot and killed a security guard.

==== February 2024 ====
The Red Crescent stated two paramedics had been "targeted and directly fired upon by Israeli forces" outside the hospital. On 1 February 2024, the Palestinian Red Crescent reported that the siege of al-Amal had entered its eleventh day, with "repeated raids into the courtyards of the hospital" and "direct fire on the buildings". The Red Crescent reported that Israeli soldiers had killed 12 people at the hospital the day prior, and wounded six, after they opened fire as they stormed the hospital. On 2 February, the Red Crescent reported another four people were killed and six were injured by Israeli forces. In a post, Tedros Adhanom Ghebreyesus reported he was "horrified by the reports about killing". On 3 February, the Red Crescent stated it had buried three of its staff members. Eleven displaced people were wounded after Israel threw smoke bombs at the hospital. The Red Crescent reported that 43 people had been killed since the start of Israel's siege.

Two people were wounded by Israeli gunfire on 7 February 2024. People were reportedly being prevented from entering or exiting the premises. On 9 February, Israeli conducted searches inside the hospital. 18 February marked the 27th day of Israel's siege on the hospital, with intense Israeli shelling and bombardment causing severe damage. Israeli forces destroyed the hospital's desalination station, leading the Red Crescent to state only three days of drinking water remained at the hospital. The Red Crescent reported significant damage to the hospital from Israeli shelling on 19 February. On 21 February, the Red Crescent stated they were still recovering corpses from the vicinity of the hospital and called on Israel "to lift the imposed siege before it is too late and the hospital is forced out of service". The hospital sustained "significant damage" on 23 February, following airstrikes in the near vicinity. A UN delegation to the hospital on 25 February reportedly encountered "catastrophic conditions", including severe shortages of food, water, and medicine.

The Palestinian Red Crescent stated it evacuated 24 patients on 26 February. UNOCHA reported that during the evacuation, the Israeli military had blocked the ambulance and forced the paramedics to strip naked. On 27 February, the World Health Organization secretary-general Tedros Adhanom Ghebreyesus stated, "The hospital experienced 40 attacks from 22 January to 22 February, which killed at least 25 and left it incapacitated. 31 patients are still in the hospital."

==== March 2024 ====
On 24 March 2024, the Palestine Red Crescent stated that it was unable to contact its staff at Al-Amal after Israeli tanks attacked the hospital and forced nearly everyone inside to evacuate. The Red Crescent further stated hospital staff remained behind with nine patients, along with a family with disabled children, and that a displaced person had been shot in the head and killed. On 25 March, the Red Crescent stated it had coordinated with the ICRC and UNOCHA to evacuate 27 medical staff and six patients. Witnesses stated the hospital had been under "constant bombing and tank shells". On 26 March, the Red Crescent stated the hospital was completely out of service.

=== Turkish-Palestinian Friendship Hospital ===
An air strike in the vicinity of the Turkish-Palestinian Friendship Hospital caused damage and was condemned by Turkey, who stated it was a violation of international law.

=== Jordan Field Hospital ===
The Jordan Field Hospital in Gaza, which has been operating since 2009, was badly affected during the conflict. The hospital faced an existential threat due to a lack of supplies during the Israeli bombardment. In response, the Jordanian Air Force sent emergency medical aid to the hospital. On 19 January 2024, the Jordanian government reported that the Israeli military had deliberately targeted its field hospital in Khan Younis, using a tank to block the hospital entrance and shooting at the hospital and bunker shelters.

=== Al Awda Hospital ===
The World Health Organization (WHO) has strongly condemned Israel's repeated orders to evacuate al-Awda Hospital in northern Gaza, calling it a death sentence for the sick and wounded. More than 2,000 patients were forced to move to southern Gaza. This will worsen the current humanitarian and public health disaster. On 1 December, Doctors Without Borders stated the hospital had been damaged "in a blast".

On 13 December, Jacobin reported 240 people were trapped at al-Awda, surrounded by Israeli snipers, without clean water and surviving on one meal per day of bread or rice. A staffer at the hospital reported Israeli snipers had shot at a one pregnant civilian at the hospital. A hospital monitoring manager stated a nurse had been killed by an Israeli sniper on the hospital's fourth floor through the window. On 14 December, the Gaza Health Ministry stated their fear that after the Israeli raid of Kamal Adwan was complete, al-Awda would be their next target. Renzo Fricke, an official at Doctors Without Borders, stated, "Reports coming out of Al-Awda hospital are harrowing and we are gravely worried for the safety of patients and staff inside". On 19 December, Doctors Without Borders reported Israeli troops seized Al Awda, with troops stripping, bounding, and interrogating all men and boys over the age of sixteen. Soldiers continued holding the hospital. A nurse was reportedly killed by a sniper on 21 December, with people left in a "state of horror". An airstrike on the hospital compound on 30 January 2024 killed at least five people. The hospital was again hit by Israeli shelling on 31 January. On 27 February, the hospital's staff stated al-Awda was at-risk of being shut down, after experiencing an 18-day siege by the Israel military.

In October 2024, the Gaza Health Ministry stated Israel had besieged and was directly targeting the Al-Awda Hospital. The Al Awda hospital stated Israeli strikes on the hospital and an ambulance had wounded several medical staff.

=== Sheikh Hamad bin Khalifa al-Thani Hospital ===
The Sheikh Hamad bin Khalifa al-Thani Hospital for Rehabilitation and Prosthetics in Gaza reported heavy damage. the hospital was the first in Gaza to equip individuals with prosthetic limbs and deliver comprehensive rehabilitation services. The hospital had already been damaged previously during an Israeli bombardment in 2021. On 20 May 2025, Israeli forces bombarded the hospital, causing material damage.

=== Attacks on ambulances ===
On 14 February 2024, the Palestinian Red Crescent shared video of an ambulance destroyed by Israeli gunfire while attempting to transport oxygen from Nasser Hospital to Al-Amal Hospital. On 25 July 2024, the Red Crescent stated Israeli forces fired on one of its ambulances in Al-Mawasi while its medics were assisting injured civilians. In late-August 2024, an Israeli rocket killed five members of a medical convoy for the American Near East Refugee Aid. In September 2024, WHO chief Tedros Adhanom Ghebreyesus wrote in a social media post that Israeli tanks had fired at a medical convoy, despite having Israeli military clearance.

==== Doctors Without Borders convoy ====
On 18 November 2023, two people were killed while traveling in a clearly identified Doctors Without Borders evacuation convoy in Gaza City. Doctors Without Borders termed it a "deliberate attack."

==== Al-Shifa ambulance airstrike ====
On 3 November 2023, amid the Israeli invasion of the Gaza Strip and siege of Gaza City, an Israeli airstrike hit an ambulance convoy departing from al-Shifa Hospital carrying critically injured patients. The strike killed 15 people and wounded at least 60. The Palestine Red Crescent Society (PRCS), which was part of the convoy, said that all 15 people killed were civilians. The airstrike also caused damage to the hospital itself.

The Israel Defense Forces (IDF) acknowledged that it carried out the airstrike, and said that Hamas militants were killed in the attack and that one of the ambulances was being used to transport Hamas personnel and weaponry. The Gaza Health Ministry denied any military use of the ambulances.

Human Rights Watch said it "did not find evidence that the ambulance was being used for military purposes". The Washington Post analyzed the videos and found no evidence of weapons or individuals in military clothing. Human Rights Watch further added that under IHL ambulances must not be attacked, even if they transport wounded combatants, and said the attack could be a war crime. The attack was condemned by the World Health Organization.

=== Kamal Adwan hospital ===
On 3 December, the IDF struck in the vicinity of Kamal Adwan hospital, killing at least four people. On 11 December, the director of Kamal Adwan Hospital stated Israel had killed two mothers and their newborn babies when Israel targeted its maternity ward. The UN confirmed the killings. On 12 December, Israel raided the Kamal Adwan Hospital. The head of pediatrics stated the IDF had ordered all men and boys above age sixteen to leave the hospital to be searched. 70 medical staffers were arrested and taken to an unknown location. The head of the World Health Organization, Dr. Tedros Adhanom Ghebreyesus, stated he was "extremely worried" about the situation at Kamal Adwan.

The IDF released a video of supposed militants near Kamal Adwan surrendering their weapons. These claims were quickly challenged by family members who identified their non-combatant relatives.

On 14 December, the Ministry of Health reported 2,500 internally displaced persons had been forcibly evacuated, and that IDF soldiers had prevented medical staff from continuing support to 12 babies in intensive care and ten emergency department patients, leading to two deaths. On 16 December, journalists reported Israeli bulldozers had crushed people sheltering outside the hospital, with one reporter describing "a terrifying massacre and unspeakable scenes" and stating, "Dozens of displaced, sick and wounded people were buried alive". Palestinian health minister Mai al-Kaila called for a probe into Israeli actions at Kamal Adwan. CAIR called for a United Nations international probe.

In October 2024, Kamal Adwan's director stated, "Israeli tanks have completely surrounded the hospital, cut off electricity and shelled the hospital, targeting the second and third floors with artillery". Later that month, the United Nations stated that a bombing destroyed critical supplies in the hospital following the end of a days-long Israeli siege.

=== Yafa Hospital ===
On 8 December, the IDF damaged the Yafa hospital in central Gaza with an airstrike.

=== Nasser Medical Complex ===
An Israeli shooting at the maternity ward of the Nasser Medical Complex in Khan Younis on 17 December killed a girl and wounded three others. Richard Peeperkorn, a WHO representative, stated 4,000 displaced internally displaced people were at risk as the Israeli military pursued operations at the hospital. On 26 January 2024, the Health Ministry stated Nasser hospital was out of food, anaesthetics, and painkillers due to an Israeli siege, stating, "There are 150 health personnel, 350 patients, and hundreds of displaced families in the Nasser Medical Complex in catastrophic conditions of starvation, targeting, and lack of treatment". On 27 January, Hani Mahmoud, an Al Jazeera journalist, stated people at Nasser were experiencing "exactly what happened... when the largest facilities like al-Shifa Hospital and the Indonesian Hospital came under attack." A 40-year-old woman was killed by an Israeli sniper outside the hospital on 7 February.

On 8 February, a doctor was reportedly shot and wounded while working in the operating room. A drone strike reportedly killed one person and wounded several others the same day. Paramedics were unable to leave the hospital due to Israeli snipers. On 9 February, Israeli snipers outside the hospital were reportedly shooting at "every moving object". An incident recorded and circulated online showed a doctor risking her life to save a young man wounded by Israeli snipers at the hospital gate. Doctors Without Borders stated on 10 February that Israeli forces were firing at people inside the hospital. Israeli tank and artillery fire reportedly hit the upper floor of the hospital. A man was killed by an Israeli sniper on 11 February on hospital grounds. Seven people in the hospital were reportedly killed by Israeli snipers on 12 February.

On 13 February, the IDF ordered displaced people inside the complex to evacuate the hospital. The same day, snipers killed three people at the hospital. The Gaza Health Ministry stated, "The displaced people are being shot while they are leaving, and people are being killed or injured". Because the hospital had run out of fuel for its generator, sewage flooded parts of the hospital. UNOCHA reported bodies of killed people had been laying outside the hospital for several days because of the danger of Israeli snipers. On 14 February, Israeli soldiers reportedly continued to fire on the facility. The Health Ministry reported there were 273 patients unable to move and 327 companions remaining in the hospital.

On 23 March 2025, an Israeli airstrike targeted the complex, killing five people, including Ismail Barhoum, a senior Hamas official, who was undergoing treatment, and a 16-year-old boy. On 13 May, Palestinian photojournalist, Hassan Aslih was killed at the hospital by an Israeli airstrike while receiving treatment from a previous Israeli strike.

Two Israeli strikes on civilians and the health system at Nasser Hospital in the besieged southern Gaza Strip on August 25 killed at least 21 people, including five journalists from Al Jazeera, Reuters, the Associated Press (AP) and others, as well as doctors and paramedics. Al Jazeera described the attack as Israel's deadliest in two years.

On 12 November 2026, an Israeli airstrike hit the surgical wing of the Al-Yassin building at the Nasser Medical Complex in Khan Younis, killing six people, including a doctor and a child. The strike also damaged operating theatres, laboratories and medical equipment, disrupting several hospital services, according to local health authorities. In response to the Israeli army's claim that Hamas forces were present in the hospital, Dr. Ayman Abu Obeid, head of the hospital's surgical department, said that he was not aware of the presence of any armed forces in the hospital and that only medical staff were present. Two British surgeons who were at the hospital at the time of the attack also said they had seen no signs of Hamas presence there.

=== Al-Rantisi and Al-Nasr children's hospitals ===
Reports indicate that medical care at Al-Rantisi and Al-Nasr children's hospitals has nearly come to a halt. Only a small generator provided power to the intensive care and neonatal intensive care units. Al-Rantisi Hospital faced intense attacks and hostilities.

Furthermore, Al-Nasr Children's Hospital has once again suffered damage, including vital equipment. Another children's hospital in the northern region has ceased operations due to both damage and a shortage of fuel. Additionally, a specialized maternity hospital is in dire need of fuel to continue functioning.

=== European Hospital ===
On 3 February 2024, Israeli attacks damaged a fuel tank at Gaza European Hospital, reportedly killing one person and injuring at least six. On 13 May 2025, a tunnel underneath the hospital was targeted by several Israeli airstrikes, killing 28 people and injuring dozens. The IDF and Shin Bet claimed that Hamas leader Mohammed Sinwar was the target of the attack. They called it a precise strike on Hamas terrorists in a command and control centre beneath the hospital. Citing "sources from Gaza-based factions," the London-based newspaper Asharq Al-Awsat reported that "the location did in fact contain a tunnel system".

=== Al-Aqsa Martyrs Hospital ===
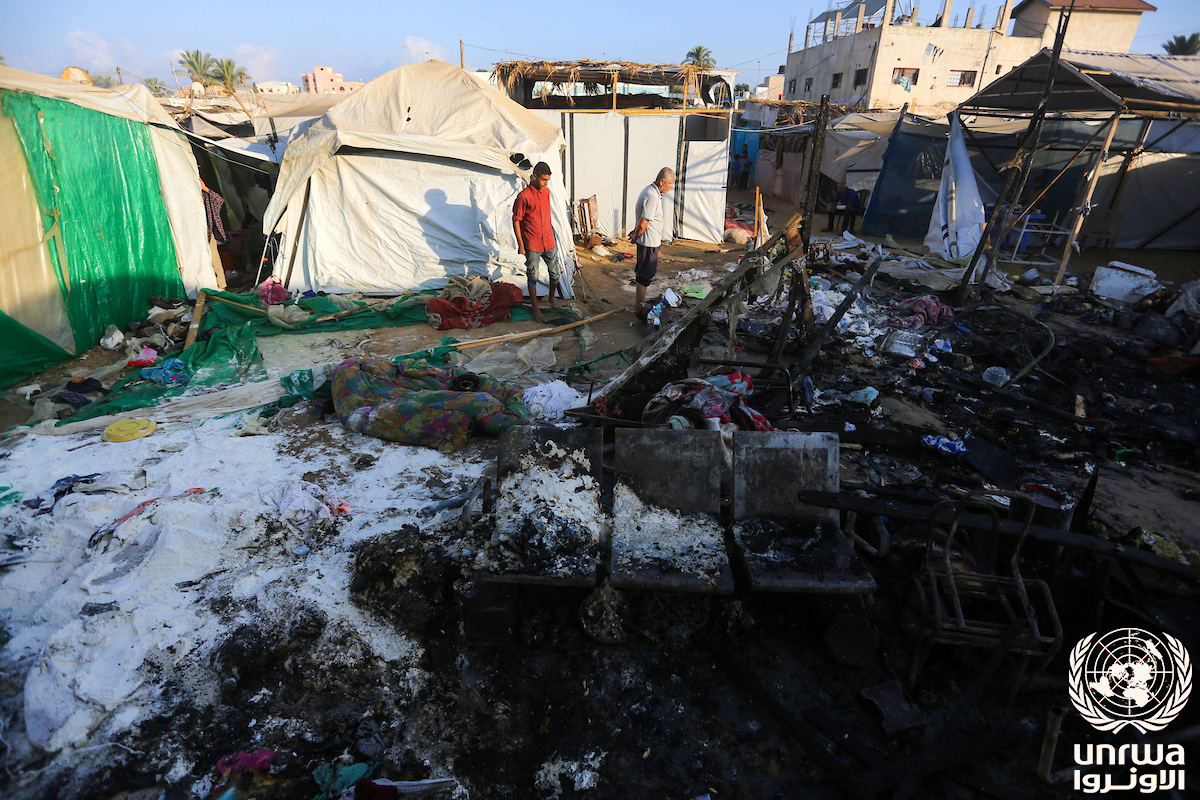
The remains of bombed tents in the courtyard of Al-Aqsa Martyrs Hospital in August 2024

On 31 March 2024, an Israeli airstrike hit the courtyard of Al-Aqsa Hospital in Deir al-Balah, central Gaza, killing at least four people and injuring 17 (confirmed by the World Health Organization (WHO) and a hospital official). Several journalists were also injured in the attack. The Israeli military says the attack was aimed at a command center operated by the Palestinian Islamic Jihad armed group. However, the official media office in Gaza reported that the airstrike hit a tent where displaced people were seeking shelter and journalists were working. Hospital spokesman Khalid al-Dakran called on the international community to ensure the safety of health workers in Gaza. In August 2024, an airstrike hit displaced people's tents in the hospital's courtyard. The strike killed four people.

=== Field hospital at the Khadija school in Deir Al-Balah ===
On 27 July 2024 Israel attacked a makeshift field hospital set up in the Khadija school in Deir al-Balah. The Israeli military claimed they were targeting a Hamas base in the school. At the field hospital 30 people were killed and more than 100 were injured. Israel claimed militants, "used the compound as a hiding place to direct and plan numerous attacks against IDF troops… (and) …developed and stored large quantities of weapons inside". But they did not quantify "large", and presence weapons at a field hospital does not always void protected status. They also showed no evidence for the assertion.

=== Al Basma IVF center ===
In December 2023, a single strike on Gaza City's Al Basma IVF center, Gaza's largest IVF centre, destroyed 4000 human embryos, this was most of the frozen IVF Embryos in the Gaza Strip. Even though the strike occurred in December 2023 it was mostly ignored until the story was published by Reuters in late April 2024.

The bombing destroyed 4000 human embryos and an additional 1000 samples of frozen sperms and eggs. The embryos were stored in liquid nitrogen, which did not require electricity to maintain; they only needed to be topped up once per month. But the blast blew the lid off 5 tanks, causing the liquid to quickly evaporate, which caused the embryos to defrost and die. There are 9 or more clinics in the Gaza Strip that perform IVF related procedures, but most of the embryos were stored in 5 liquid nitrogen tanks at the Al Basma center. The clinic was established in 1997 by obstetrician and gynecologist Bahaeldeen Ghalayini. Bahaeldeen Ghalayini said a single Israeli shell struck the part of the centre where there embryos were stored on the ground floor, but he said he did not know if the lab had been specifically targeted by the strike.

Dr Bahaeldeen Ghalayini told Reuters that, "At least half of the couples – those who can no longer produce sperm or eggs to make viable embryos – will not have another chance to get pregnant". One of these people was a 45-year-old woman, whose 19-year-old only child died in a bombing near Jabalia refugee camp in 2022.

Gaza's government health ministry funded IVF treatment for a limited number of couples. In 2017 The Guardian described this as a, "goodwill gesture by the ruling Hamas party".

Since 2004, fertility clinics in both Gaza and the West Bank have been having Palestinian prisoners of Israel become parents by using sperm smuggled out of prisons, for security prisoners who are denied conjugal visits with their wives. Palestinians viewed this as a victory over the “oppressing Israeli authorities”.

On 13 March 2025, a UN investigation found that Israeli forces intentionally attacked and destroyed Al-Basma IVF Centre, the main in-vitro fertility clinic in Gaza which served 2,000-3,000 patients a month, including all its reproductive materials stored for future Palestinian babies. No evidence that the building was used for military purposes was found. According to Navi Pillay, the clinic was a standalone building not connected to other hospital buildings. Pillay cited the attack as one piece of evidence that the UNHRC Commission of Inquiry on Gaza genocide used to find that Israel was committing genocide in Gaza.

=== Other facilities ===
On 15 February 2024, the United Nations reported that Israel had destroyed its Rehabilitation Centre for Visually Impaired, a clinic for visually impaired children, stating the "centre was available to all visually impaired children across the Gaza Strip and provided braille machines, canes, [and] visual aids". On 10 March 2024, the offices of the Palestine Children's Relief Fund, a charity that provides medical care for children who lack access to care, was bombed and destroyed. On 31 March 2024, two tents outside of the Al-Aqsa Hospital were hit by Israeli airstrikes.

In May 2024, the Kuwaiti Hospital stated it was nonoperational due to attacks by Israeli forces. The Gaza Health Ministry condemned Israel's killing of two health workers at the hospital, calling it a "heinous crime". The same month, an Israeli hit reportedly damaged the upper floors of the Indonesian field hospital in Rafah. The Red Cross stated one of its facilities was damaged on 22 June 2024 by nearby shelling. In October 2024, Israel reportedly fired ten missiles at the Yemen Al-Saeed Hospital in Jabalia. The same month, an Israeli airstrike near the largest hospital in Deir al-Balah hit a mosque where displaced people were sheltering.

== UN Aid workers and other medical personnel ==
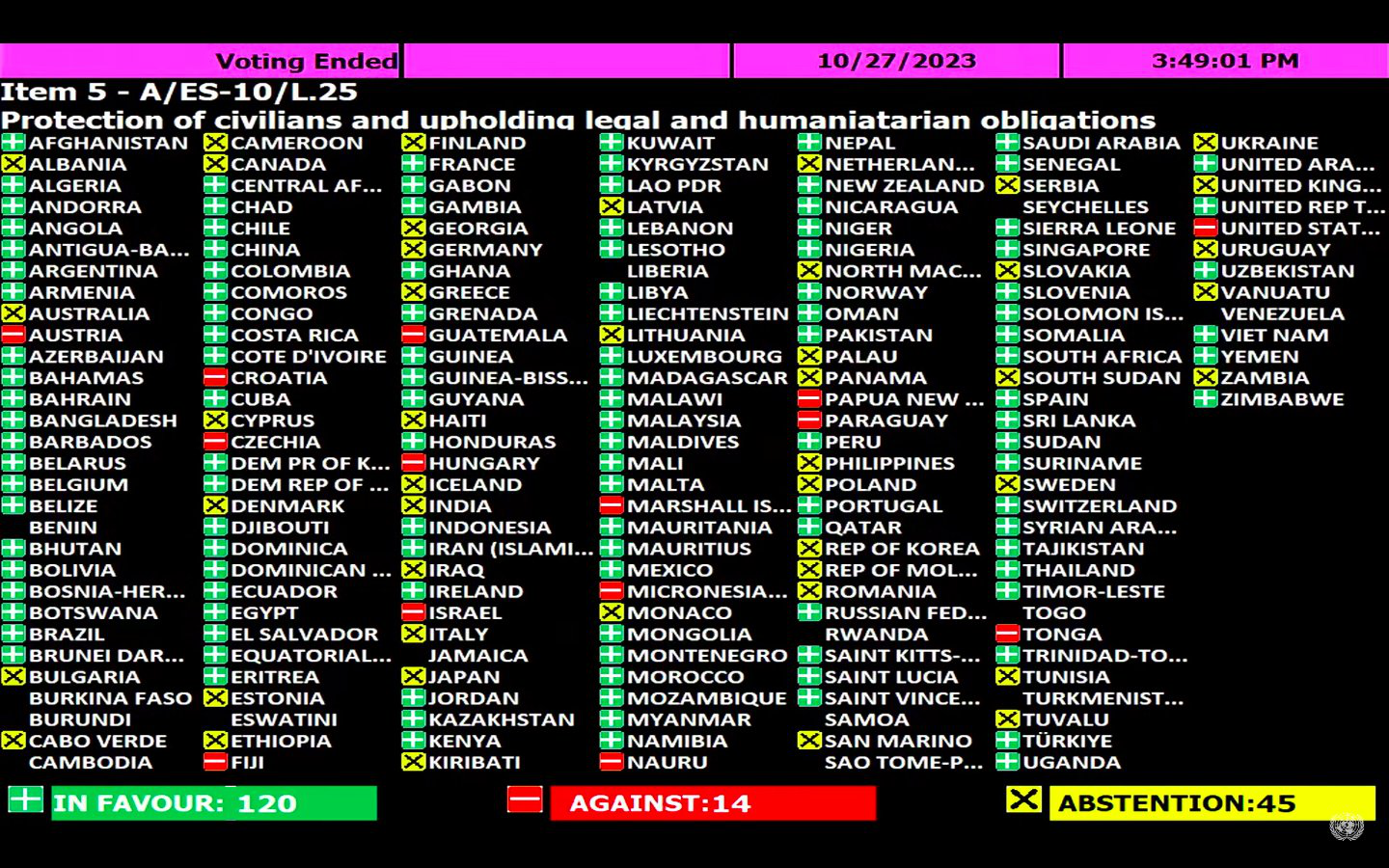
On 27 October, the United Nations General Assembly passed Resolution ES-10/21 calling for an "immediate and sustained" humanitarian truce and cessation of hostilities.

Medical personnel have taken a heavy toll in the conflict, as many doctors have been killed by Israeli airstrikes, and attacks by the Israeli army.

According to an update from the UN World Health Organization (WHO), doctors in Gaza have been conducting surgeries without the use of anesthesia or other essential surgical resources. The report highlights that fuel has now become the most crucial commodity in the region. Dr. Rick Brennan, the Emergencies Director for the Eastern Mediterranean Region at the UN health agency (WHO), expressed the urgent need for continuous, expanded, and safeguarded humanitarian operations.

=== UN health agency ===
The World Health Organization (WHO) has reported a significant increase in cases of diarrhoea in Gaza, with a 66 percent rise among children under five and a 55 percent increase in the rest of the population; although these figures may not accurately reflect the full extent of the situation due to incomplete information and the collapsing health system in the region. Doctors and aid workers have expressed concerns about the potential for epidemics in this dire humanitarian situation. The inhabitants of the Gaza Strip, who are currently enduring the onslaught of Israel's bombings and gunfire, are now confronted with the escalation of illnesses due to the torrential winter rains that have inundated their temporary dwellings. Moreover, they are grappling with a severe scarcity of nourishment and safe drinking water.

In its latest report on conditions in Gaza, the UN Office for the Coordination of Humanitarian Affairs mentioned the WHO has reported diverse cases of the items such as: meningitis, chickenpox, jaundice and upper respiratory tract infections.

== Impact ==
Attacks on healthcare facilities have had devastating consequences for the population. Hospitals in Gaza are facing severe shortages of medical supplies amid Israel's blockade. Hospitals are running on external generators – a backup that is heading into its last few hours. Israel has cut off water, electricity and fuel supplies, leaving 2.3 million people stranded. The World Health Organization has stressed the urgent need to end the violence and create a humanitarian corridor in the Gaza Strip.

Because of the fuel shortage, Gaza's health facilities are not able to run generators to deliver lifesaving healthcare, it is impossible for ambulances to run, water desalination plants cannot function, as well as for garbage disposal, and other problems.

According to a recent report by the United Nations, water consumption in Gaza has plummeted by 92% compared to pre-conflict levels. This decline is alarming considering the already dire state of the water supply in Gaza, which has been catastrophic since before 7 October 2023. The situation worsened on 4 November and 5 November 2023, when seven water desalination facilities across the Gaza Strip were directly targeted and suffered significant damage. Among the affected infrastructure were three sewage pipelines in Gaza City, two water reservoirs in Gaza City, Rafah, and Jabalia refugee camp, as well as two water wells in Rafah. Given that it is currently winter in Gaza and heavy rainfall is not uncommon, the Gaza municipality has issued a warning about the imminent risk of sewage flooding.

== Reactions ==
Health officials and medical organizations in the Gaza Strip accused Israel of deliberately bombing ambulances and health facilities in the besieged enclave. And said that these attacks are considered a violation of international laws that include such attacks in the list of war crimes.

The Joint Arab-Islamic Summit urged the International Criminal Court's prosecutor to "thoroughly investigate the war crimes and crimes against humanity committed by Israel against the Palestinians."

Human Rights Watch (HRW) said the attack on an ambulance near al-Shafa Hospital should be investigated as a possible war crime. The UN Special Rapporteur on the right to health, Tlaleng Mofokeng, stated "Protected sites under international human rights law and international humanitarian law have been bombed and attacked".

President Recep Tayyip Erdogan has said that Turkey has "crossed out" Israeli Prime Minister Benjamin Netanyahu and will refer Israel's human rights abuses and war crimes to the International Criminal Court (ICC).

The Independent International Commission of Inquiry on the Occupied Palestinian Territory, including East Jerusalem, and Israel found that Israel's destruction of Gaza's healthcare system constituted war crimes and the crime against humanity of extermination. Adele Khodr, the Regional Director of UNICEF Middle East and North Africa, emphasized that the rights of children to life and health are being violated. She stressed that the laws of war require the protection of hospitals and the provision of life-saving medical supplies, both of which are urgently needed. In addition to the already burdened medical facilities in the middle and southern areas of the Gaza Strip, there is now the added challenge of providing healthcare to the hundreds of thousands of people who have recently arrived and are residing in densely populated areas. It is crucial to provide the necessary support and reinforcement to these existing services in order to effectively address the growing challenges they are facing.

Mohamed Elmasry, a Canadian engineering professor at the Doha Institute for Graduate Studies, stated, "For four and a half months Israel has been seeking to make life unlivable for Palestinians, and part of that operation is attacking hospitals... What Israel has been doing is part of the 'Greater Israel' plan. They will not finish until they ethnically cleanse Gaza."

Doctors from the US, UK and France who were involved in humanitarian missions in Gaza in recent months accused Israeli Defense Forces of systematically targeting healthcare facilities in Gaza and "dismantling the whole healthcare system". Professor Nick Maynard, formerly director for cancer services at Oxford University, said: "It's not just about targeting the buildings, it's about systematically destroying the infrastructure of the hospitals. Destroying the oxygen tanks at the al-Shifa hospital, deliberately destroying the CT scanners and making it much more difficult to rebuild that infrastructure. If it was just targeting Hamas militants, why are they deliberately destroying the infrastructure of these institutions?" Maynard said he had witnessed the indiscriminate killing of countless innocent civilians and had performed operations continuously for a fortnight, far more often on women than on men. He recalled seeing appalling burns and amputations on children, including a girl who had such severe burns that her facial bones were visible: "We knew there was no chance of her surviving that but there was no morphine to give her. So not only was she inevitably going to die but she would die in agony." In fact, Maynard added, the girl died lying on the hospital floor, as there was not even a bed available for her. In May 2024, more than 30 states condemned Israel's attacks on Gaza's health system.

== See also ==
- Attacks on refugee camps in the Gaza war
- Attacks on schools during the Israeli invasion of Gaza
- First Geneva Convention
- Gaza genocide
- Israeli attacks on the Lebanese health sector during the Israel-Hezbollah conflict (2023–present)
- Killing of health workers in the Gaza war
- List of military engagements during the Gaza war
- Russian strikes on hospitals during the Russian invasion of Ukraine
- Russian–Syrian hospital bombing campaign
- Saudi-led airstrikes on Yemen
- Timeline of the Gaza Strip healthcare collapse
