= Physicians Across Continents =

International humanitarian organization

- Founded: March 2003; 23 years ago
- Type: Medical humanitarian organisation
- Location: London, United Kingdom
- Region served: 39 countries
- Secretary general: Dr. Saad Alqarni
- Website: www.physiciansac.org

Physicians Across Continents (PAC) is an international medical humanitarian organization that provides medical care to patients and peoples affected with crises and disasters, regardless of their race, religion and country.

The organization Headquarters is in London (2016), the capital of the United Kingdom, with operating offices in United Kingdom, Turkey, Sudan, Somalia and Kenya, in addition to previous and ongoing relief missions in 39 countries in Africa and Asia. PAC carries out its activity on basis of humanitarian principles related to the ethics of profession of medicine, according to its mission adopted since it was launched.

== Establishment ==
A group of physicians, pharmacists, nurses, administrators and media workers, who work in the field of health founded PAC at the beginning of the year 1424 AH – 2003 AD.

After few years, PAC joined the Muslim World League (MWL) to work in the field of charitable medical work in some poor countries.

PAC starts its work through the Executive Council, which directs the work, in cooperation with other administrations, that includes disasters units, media center, and department of training and development, and the department of internal therapeutic coordination, in addition to financial and administrative departments.

== Strategy ==
The administration strategy of the organization depends on several axes which directly support the mission and the organization objectives as well. Each axis employs a number of objectives that are reliable in the development of operational plans, these axes are:

- Controlling and treating wide spread epidemics.
- Contributing in disaster relief.
- Creating specialized medicalstuffs and centers.
- Providing medical practical applications & solutions and upgrading societies health level.

== Name in other languages ==
- Médecins à Travers les Continents (French)
- أطباء عبر القارات (Arabic)
- Kıtalararası Doktorlar Derneği (Turkish)
