= Palestinian genocide allegations =

- Part of the Israeli–Palestinian conflict
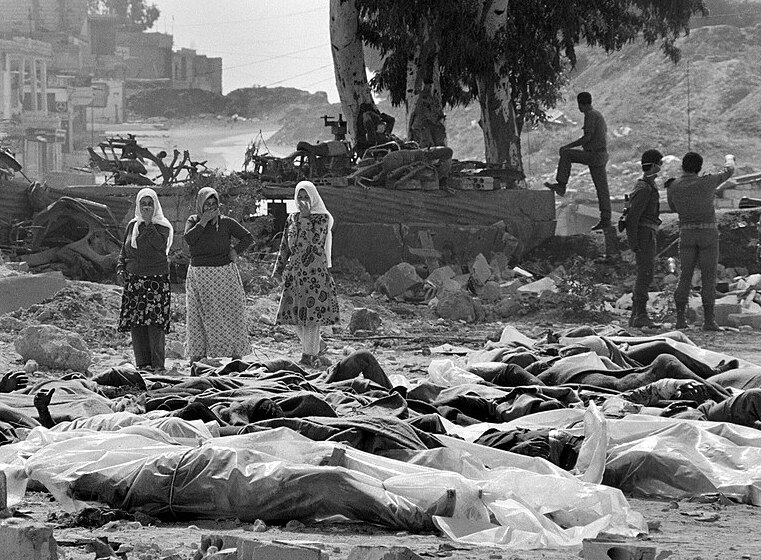
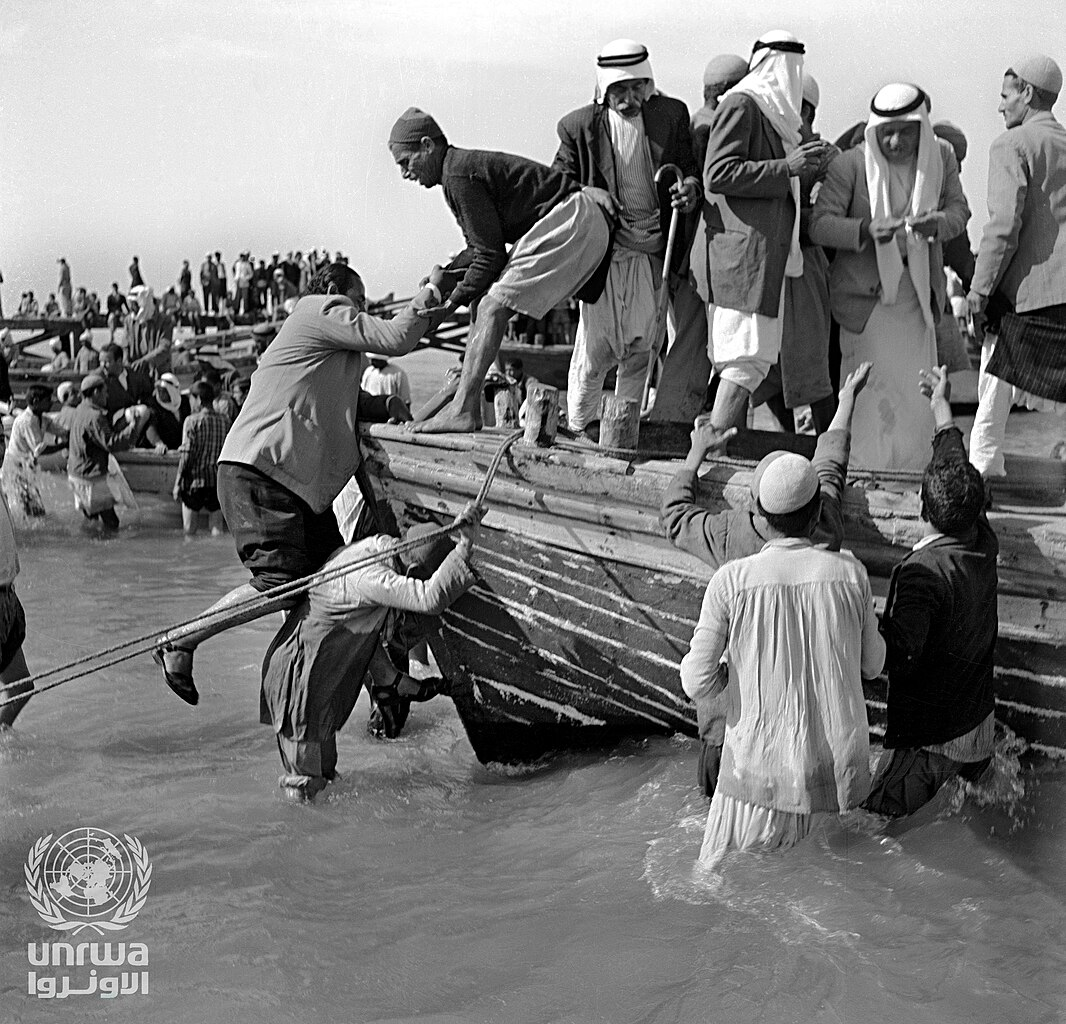
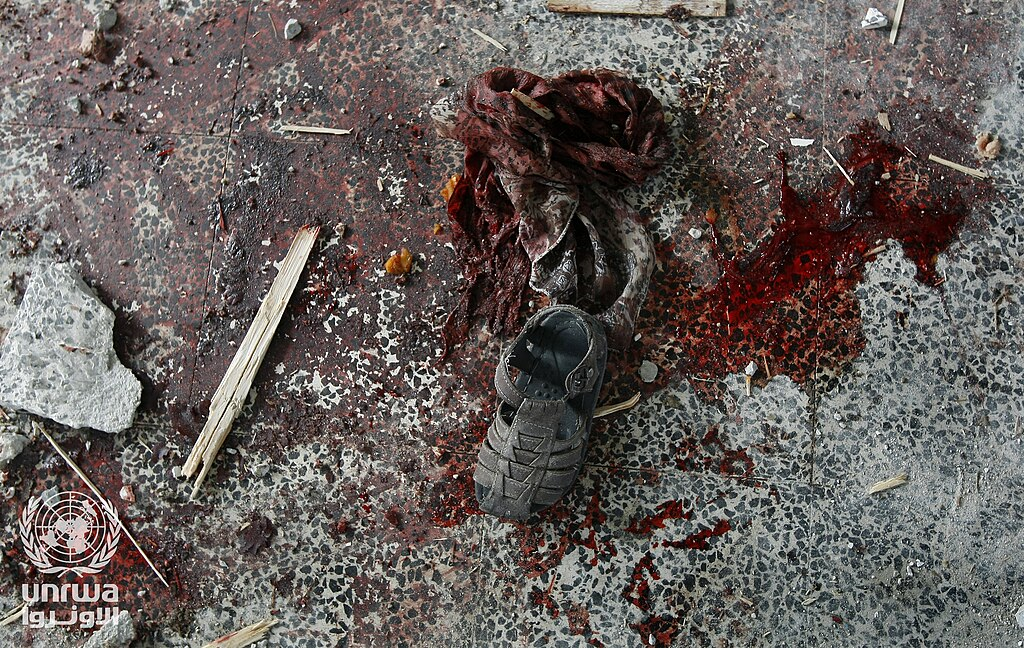
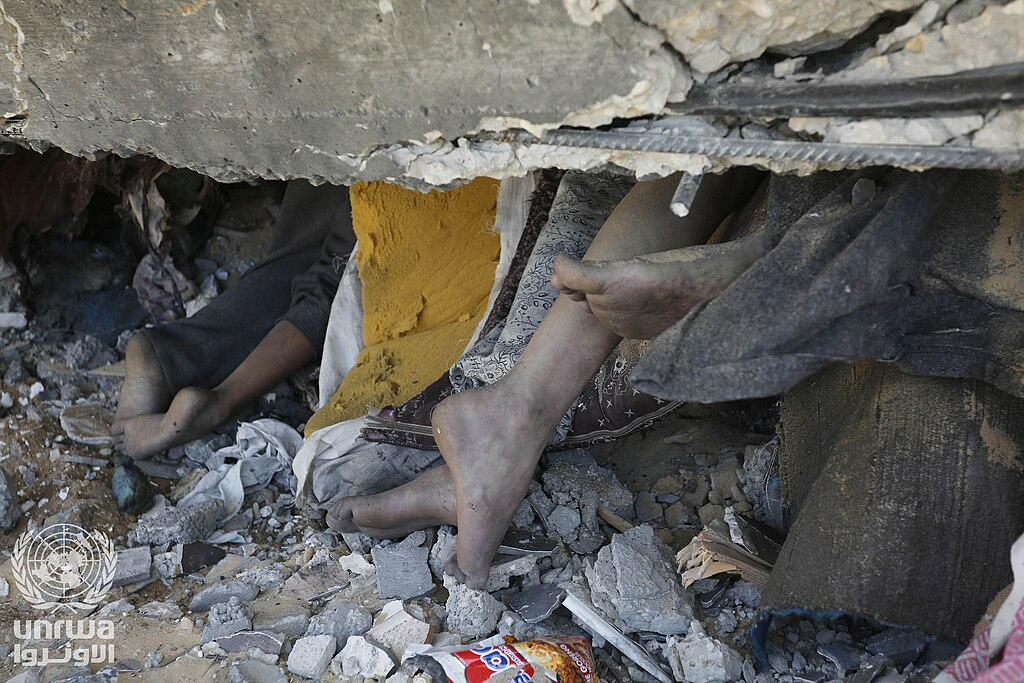
- Top to bottom, left to right: 1. Bodies of victims of the Sabra and Shatila massacre in Lebanon in 1982; 2. Palestinian refugees leaving the Gaza Strip during the Nakba in 1948; 3. A blood-stained shoe found in the classroom of a UN school targeted by an Israeli strike during the 2009 Gaza War; 4. Palestinians under the rubble during the 2023 Israeli bombing of the Gaza Strip
- Location: Palestine (region)
- Date: 1948–present
- Target: Palestinians
- Attack type: Genocide, mass murder, forced displacement, ethnic cleansing, collective punishment, starvation
- Victim: 134,000 killed
- Accused: Israel

Since its foundation in 1948, Israel has been accused of carrying out genocide against Palestinians during the Israeli–Palestinian conflict. Israel's actions since 2023 during the Gaza war have led to increasing numbers of international legal scholars concluding that Israel is committing genocide. Debate continues over whether Israel's treatment of Palestinians prior to 2023—since the 1948 Nakba—also constitutes genocide, and whether such actions are continuous or limited to specific periods or events. This treatment has also been characterised as "slow-motion genocide", as well as a corollary or expression of settler colonialism, ethnic cleansing, and indigenous land theft. Those who believe Israel's actions constitute genocide point to the entrenched anti-Palestinian racism, anti-Arab racism, Islamophobia and genocidal rhetoric in Zionism and in Israeli society, and point to events such as the Nakba, the Sabra and Shatila massacre, the blockade of the Gaza Strip, the 2014 Gaza War, and the 2023–present Gaza war as particularly pertinent genocidal episodes. International law and genocide scholars have accused Israeli officials of using dehumanising language.

On 29 December 2023, South Africa filed a case against Israel at the International Court of Justice, alleging that Israel's conduct in Gaza during the 2023 war amounted to genocide. South Africa asked the ICJ to issue provisional measures, including ordering Israel to halt its military campaign in Gaza. The Israeli government agreed to defend itself at the ICJ proceedings, while also denouncing South Africa's actions as "disgraceful" and accusing it of abetting "the modern heirs of the Nazis". South Africa's case has been supported by a number of countries. On 26 January 2024, the ICJ issued a preliminary ruling finding that the claims in South Africa's filing were "plausible" and issued an order to Israel requiring them to take all measures within their power to prevent acts of genocide and to allow basic humanitarian services into Gaza.

Israel and the United States have rejected the assertion that the former is engaging in genocide. While some scholars describe Palestinians as victims of genocide, others argue that what took place was ethnic cleansing, politicide, spaciocide, cultural genocide or similar. (Note: The designation of genocide can also be dependent on the specific event talked about, as an example while Ilan Pappé does not consider the Nakba an act of genocide, he considers Israel's actions against Gaza in the Second Intifada and the 2008–2009 Gaza War, acts of genocide.) Some critics of the accusation have argued that charges of Israel committing genocide are commonly made by anti-Zionists with the aim of demonising or delegitimising Israel.

== History ==
=== 20th century ===
==== Nakba ====
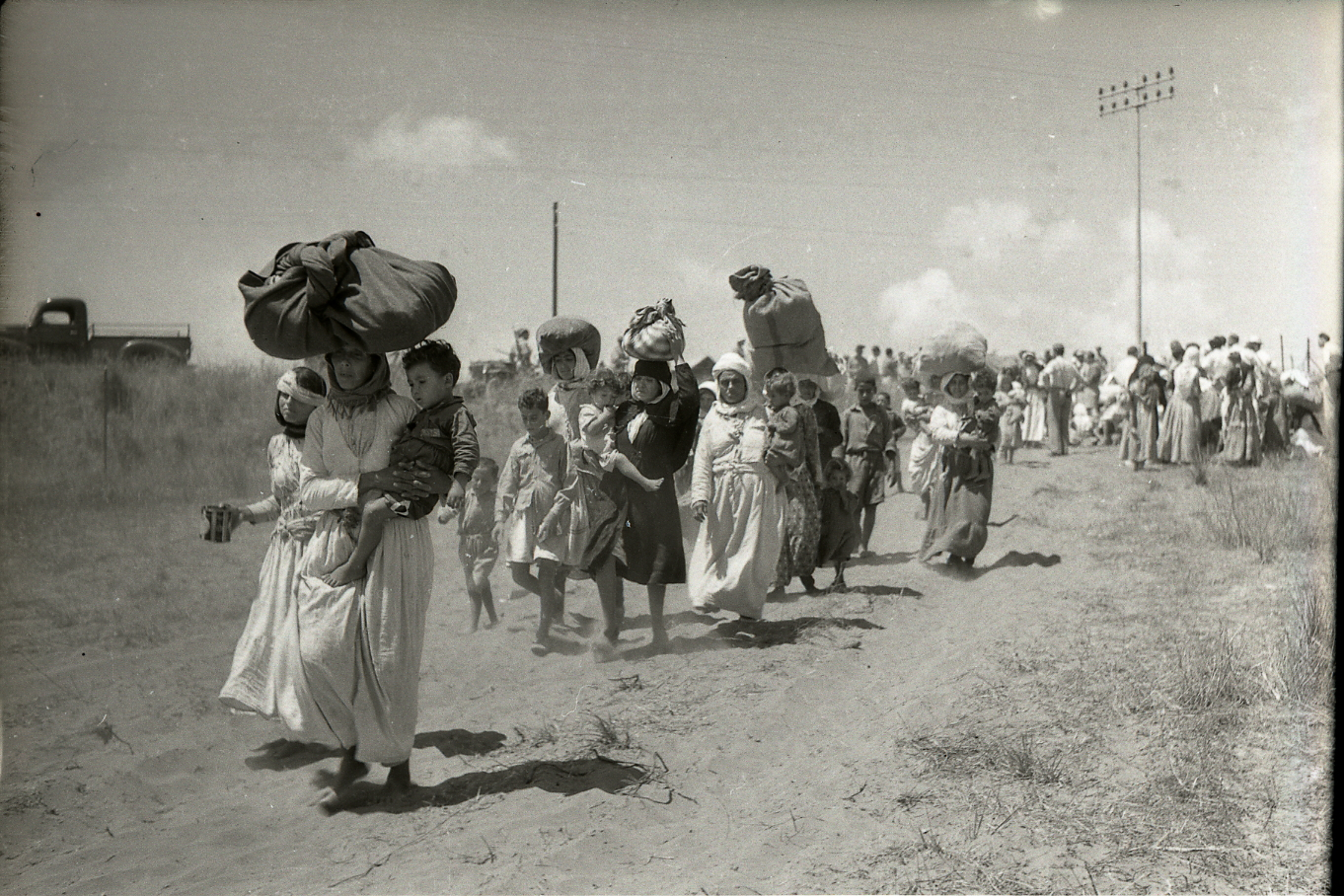
1948 expulsion of the Tantura women and children to Furaydis

The Nakba was the violent displacement and dispossession of the Palestinian people, along with the destruction of their society, culture, identity, political rights, and national aspirations. The Nakba began during the 1948 Palestine war; the term ongoing Nakba has been used to describe the continued persecution and displacement of Palestinians by Israel throughout the Palestinian territories. Palestinians continued to be expelled after the war, and more Palestinian towns and villages were destroyed, with new Israeli settlements established in their place. Israel has been accused of carrying out forced displacement (ethnic cleansing), looting, psychological warfare, and rape and sexual violence during the Nakba.

During the foundational events of the Nakba in 1948, dozens of massacres targeting Arabs were conducted and about 400 Arab-majority towns and villages were depopulated. Many of these areas were either completely destroyed or repopulated by Jewish residents and given new Hebrew names. Approximately 750,000 Palestinian Arabs (about half of Palestine's Arab population) fled from their homes or were expelled by Zionist militias and later the Israeli army.

In 2010, historians Martin Shaw and Omer Bartov debated whether the 1948 Nakba should be regarded as a genocide, with Shaw arguing that it could and with Bartov disagreeing. Daud Abdullah, the former Deputy Secretary General of the Muslim Council of Britain, has said: "Given the declared intent of the Zionist leaders, this wholesale destruction and depopulation of Palestinian villages fit[s] easily with the definition of genocide as cited in the Convention on the Prevention and Punishment of the Crime of Genocide." Australian historian John Docker has also argued that the Nakba is a case of genocide. Several scholars have written that Palestinians suffered ethnic cleansing during the Nakba, but that they did not consider the event to have been genocide. (Note: Ilan Pappé (2006), Mark Levene (2007), Ronit Lentin (2010), Derek Penslar (2013), Yair Auron (2017), Alon Confino (2018), Jerome Slater (2020))

==== Naksa ====
Academic Clare Brandabur includes the Naksa (known as the 1967 Palestinian exodus) in the actions conducted by Israel that show a pattern that seeks the "destruction of the national pattern of the oppressed group". This view is supported by later academics as well. The Naksa was the expulsion of around 280,000 to 325,000 Palestinians during and in the aftermath of the Six-Day War, including the razing of numerous Palestinian villages.

==== Sabra and Shatila massacre ====
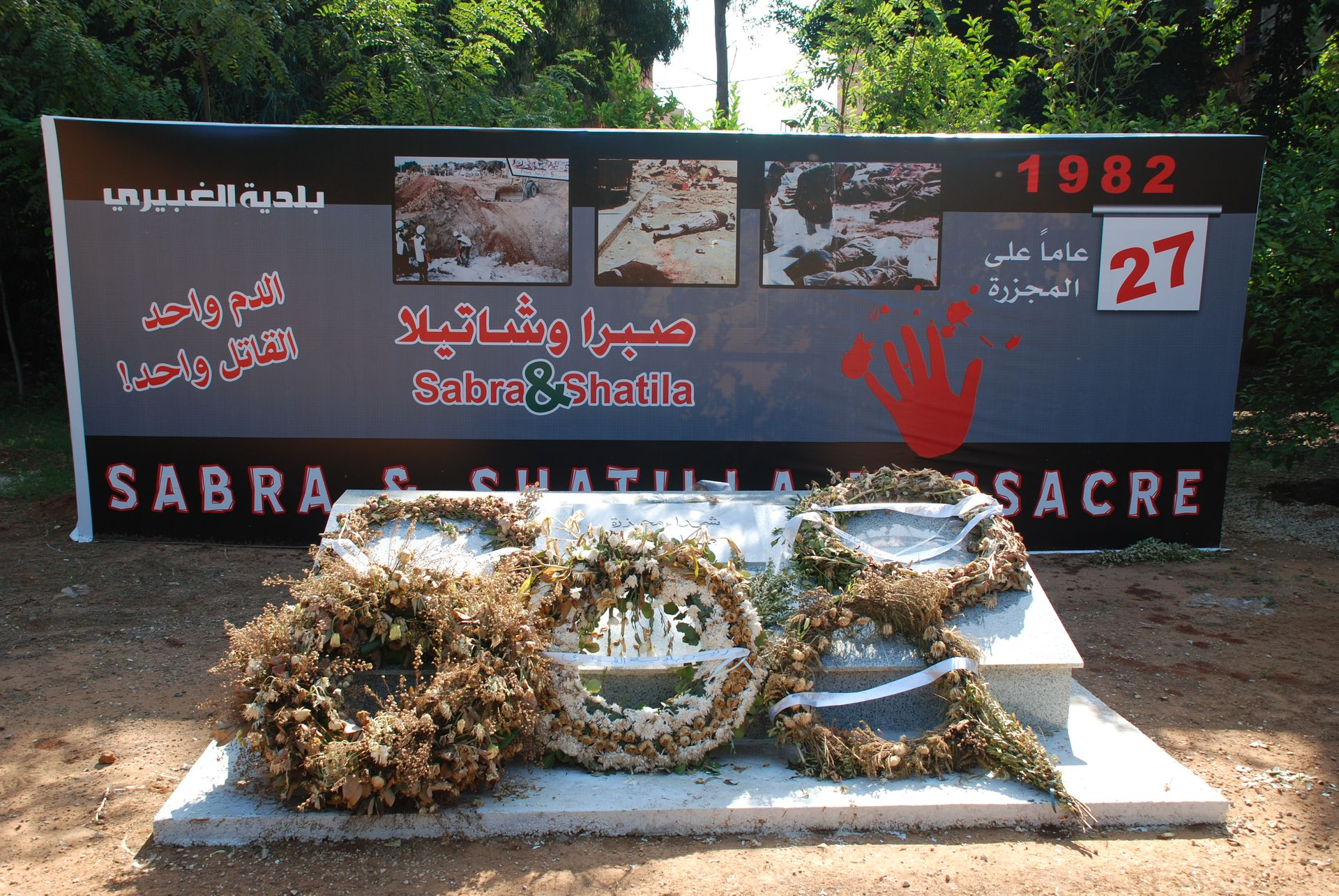
Memorial for the dead killed in the massacre in Sabra, South Beirut

In September 1982, between 460 and 3,500 civilians—mostly Palestinians and Lebanese Shia Muslims—were killed in Beirut's Sabra neighborhood and in the adjacent Shatila refugee camp during the Lebanese Civil War. The killings were carried out by the Lebanese Forces, one of the main Christian militias in Lebanon at the time. Between the evening of 16 September and the morning of 18 September, the Lebanese militia carried out the killings while the Israel Defense Forces (IDF) had the Palestinian camp surrounded. The IDF had ordered the militia to clear out the fighters of the Palestine Liberation Organization (PLO) from Sabra and Shatila as part of a larger Israeli maneuver into western Beirut. As the massacre unfolded, the IDF received reports of atrocities being committed, but did not take any action to stop it.

On 16 December 1982, the United Nations General Assembly condemned the Sabra and Shatila massacre and declared it to be an act of genocide. The voting record on section D of Resolution 37/123 was: yes: 123; no: 0; abstentions: 22; non-voting: 12. The delegate for Canada stated: "The term genocide cannot, in our view, be applied to this particular inhuman act". The delegate of Singapore – voting 'yes' – added: "My delegation regrets the use of the term 'an act of genocide' ... [as] the term 'genocide' is used to mean acts committed with intent to destroy, in whole or in part, a national, ethnic, racial or religious group." Canada and Singapore questioned whether the General Assembly was competent to determine whether such an event would constitute genocide. The Soviet Union, by contrast, asserted that: "The word for what Israel is doing on Lebanese soil is genocide. Its purpose is to destroy the Palestinians as a nation." The Nicaragua delegate asserted: "It is difficult to believe that a people that suffered so much from the Nazi policy of extermination in the middle of the twentieth century would use the same fascist, genocidal arguments and methods against other peoples." The United States commented that "While the criminality of the massacre was beyond question, it was a serious and reckless misuse of language to label this tragedy genocide as defined in the 1948 Convention". William Schabas, director of the Irish Centre for Human Rights at the National University of Ireland, stated: "the term genocide ... had obviously been chosen to embarrass Israel rather than out of any concern with legal precision".

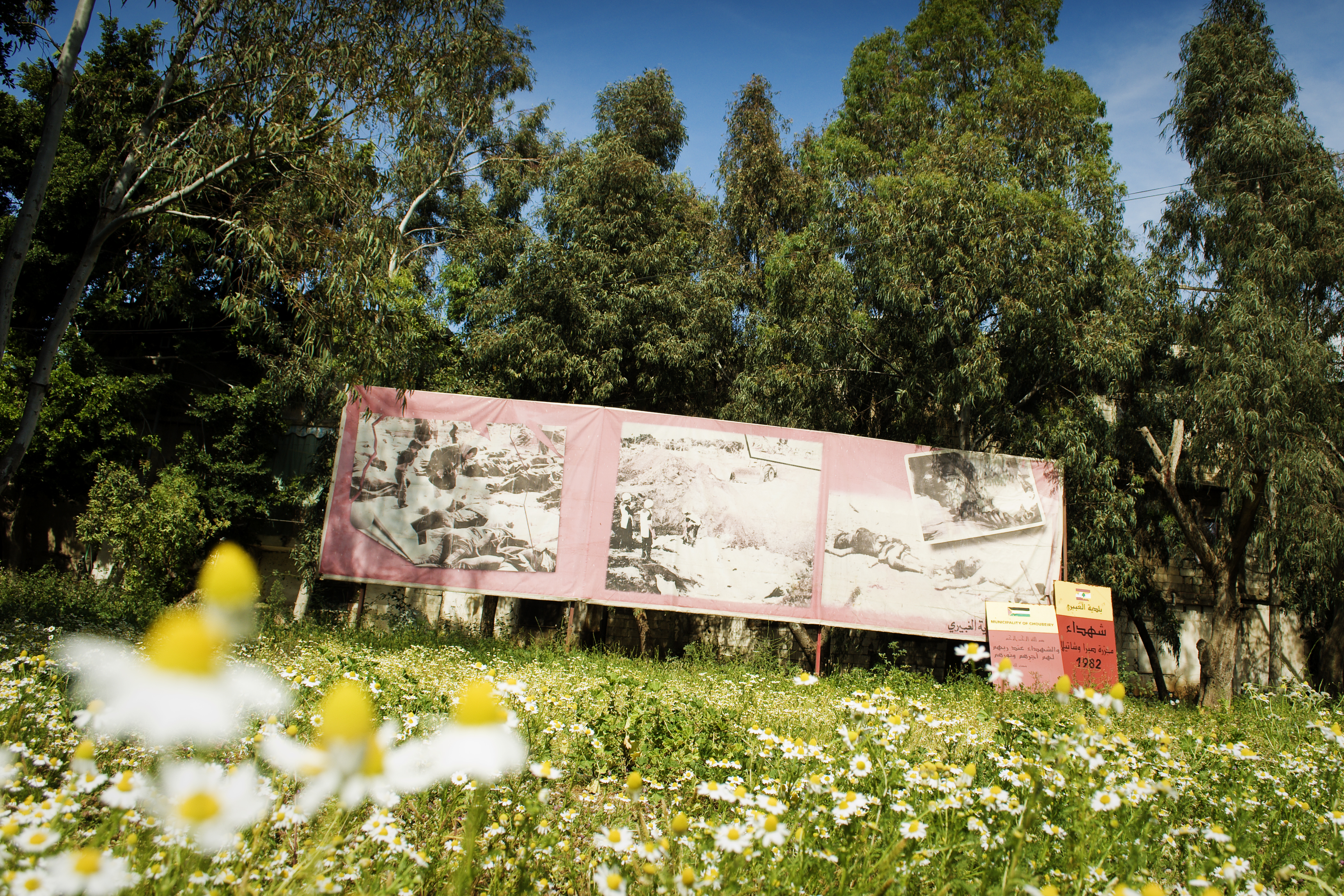
Martyr's Square is a site in Shatila refugee camp where one of the mass executions took place during the Sabra and Shatila massacre, as well as burial grounds for some of the victims.

That same year an independent commission headed by Seán MacBride investigated reported violations of International Law by Israel and four of its six members concluded that "the deliberate destruction of the national and cultural rights and identity of the Palestinian people amount[ed] to genocide". In its conclusion, the commission recommended "that a competent international body be designed or established to clarify the conception of genocide in relation to Israeli policies and practices toward the Palestinian people". David Hirst believes that while the decision of the U.N. General Assembly could still be called biased, it was harder to say the same about the McBride Commission, as well as about individuals around the world, especially Jews, who shared the opinion of its four members.

The massacre was also investigated by the Israeli Kahan Commission. The commission concluded that although no Israelis were directly involved in the killings, a number of Israeli government ministers and military were indirectly responsible. They should have taken into account the sentiments of their Lebanese allies after their leader Bachir Gemayel had been assassinated along with 26 other Phalangists in a bomb attack 2 days earlier, and also have taken decisive action to stop the killings when the first information was received. The commission's findings were reluctantly accepted by the Israeli government, amid violent, rival, pro- and anti-government protests.

In interviews with film director Lokman Slim in 2005, some of the fighters of the Lebanese Christian militias reported that, prior to the massacre, the IDF took them to training camps in Israel and showed them documentaries about the Holocaust. The Israelis told the Lebanese fighters that the same would happen to them too, as a minority in Lebanon, if the fighters did not take action against the Palestinians. The film was called "Massaker", it featured six perpetrators of the Sabra and Shatila massacre, and it was awarded the Fipresci Prize at the 2005 Berlinale.

=== 21st century ===
==== Second Intifada ====
At the UN-backed 2001 Durban Conference Against Racism, the majority of delegates approved a declaration that accused Israel of being a "racist apartheid state" guilty of "war crimes, acts of genocide and ethnic cleansing". Reed Brody, the then-executive director of Human Rights Watch, criticised the declaration, arguing that "Israel has committed serious crimes against Palestinian people but it is simply not accurate to use the word genocide", while Claudio Cordone, a spokesman for Amnesty International, stated that "[w]e are not ready to make the assertion that Israel is engaged in genocide".

During the 2002 battle of Jenin, numerous Palestinian officials, as well as a British forensics expert who entered the camp as part of an Amnesty International team, accused the Israel Defense Forces of carrying out a massacre of Palestinian civilians numbering in the 100s at the Jenin refugee camp in the West Bank. A. N. Wilson, a columnist for the British newspaper The Independent, wrote that "we are talking here of massacre, and a cover-up, of genocide", while Yasmin Alibhai-Brown called for Ariel Sharon to be tried for crimes against humanity. Subsequent investigations by Human Rights Watch and the United Nations confirmed that there had been no massacre, but accused Israel of committing war crimes.

==== Blockade of Gaza ====
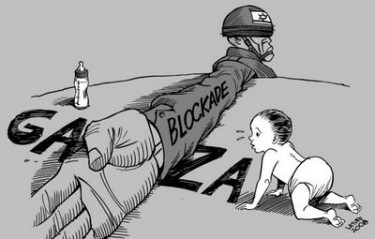
Cartoon by Carlos Latuff depicting the consequences of Israel's blockade on Gaza in 2010

The restrictions on movement and goods in Gaza imposed by Israel date to the early 1990s. After Hamas took over in 2007, Israel significantly intensified existing movement restrictions and imposed a complete blockade on the movement of goods and people in and out of the Gaza Strip. In the same year, Egypt closed the Rafah Border Crossing. Many protestors across the globe called the blockade an act of genocide, with the Venezuelan president Hugo Chavez recalling Venezuela's ambassador in Israel and calling Israel's attacks "genocide".

Israeli New Historian Ilan Pappé has argued that genocide "is the only appropriate way to describe what the Israeli army is doing in the Gaza Strip". In his 2017 book, Ten Myths About Israel, Pappé wrote: "Israel's claim that its actions since 2006 have been part of a self-defensive war against terror. I will venture to call ... an incremental genocide of the people of Gaza." In an article published in 2022 in the International Journal of Human Rights, Mohammed Nijim voiced his belief "that Israeli policies that were enacted after the introduction of the Blockade of the Gaza Strip amount[ed] to slow-motion genocide", following previous descriptions of Israel's treatment of Palestinians as a "slow-motion genocide". This is in line with Uğur Ümit Üngör's application of Lemkin's description of genocide as the "imposition of the national pattern" as being "genocidal as incremental forms of slow violence." Through the period of the blockade various other commentators from political and news organisations have labelled the blockade variously as genocide and sociocide. The 2007 blockade has continued since its implementation.

==== 2008 Gaza War ====
In the 2008–2009 Gaza War, also known as Operation Cast Lead, The United Nations Fact Finding Mission on the Gaza Conflict found that Israel, at least in part, targeted the people of Gaza as a whole. American human rights lawyer Francis Boyle and historian Ilan Pappé both consider Israel's actions against Gaza in the 2008 Gaza War to be genocidal.

==== 2014 Gaza War ====
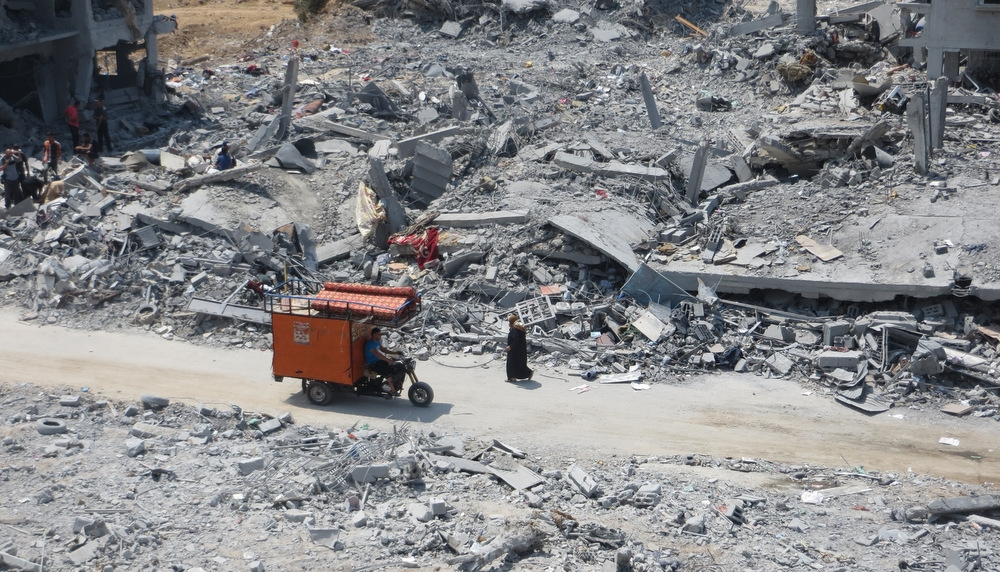
Ruins of buildings in Beit Hanoun, August 2014

The 2014 Gaza War, also referred to as Operation Protective Edge, was a military operation launched by Israel on 8 July 2014 in the Gaza Strip. Al-Haq, a Palestinian Human Rights organization, concluded in a report that serious violations of international law were committed in the course of the 2014 Israeli offensive against Gaza. The organization, along with other Palestinian human rights organizations the Palestinian Centre for Human Rights, Al Mezan Center for Human Rights and Addameer, submitted a legal file to the International Criminal Court encouraging it to begin an investigation and prosecution into the crimes against humanity and war crimes committed during the course of Israel's 2014 Gaza offensive. The crime of genocide was referenced as an Israeli crime by these groups. Additionally, dozens of Holocaust survivors, along with hundreds of descendants of Holocaust survivors and victims, accused Israel of "genocide" for the deaths of more than 2,000 Palestinians in Gaza during the 2014 Gaza War. In a September statement to the United Nations, Palestinian president Mahmoud Abbas stated that the war amounted to a genocidal crime. Political analyst and diplomat Abukar Arman drew parallels between what he called the "genocide in Palestine" and the Darfur genocide, highlighting what he believes to be political motives for the international community labelling Darfur a genocide, but not Palestine.

==== 2021 Israel–Palestine crisis ====
During the 2021 Israel–Palestine crisis, a video circulated on social media showing Israelis celebrating at the Western Wall, whilst a tree near the Al-Aqsa Mosque burns in the background. A large crowd of Israeli Jews gathered around a fire near the mosque on 10 May, chanting yimakh shemam, a Hebrew curse meaning "may their names be erased". IfNotNow co-founder and B'Tselem USA director Simone Zimmerman criticized them as exhibiting "genocidal animus towards Palestinians — emboldened and unfiltered". The Intercept described the video as "unsettling" and an example of "ultranationalist frenzy". Ayman Odeh, a member of the Knesset for the Joint List, said the video was "shocking".

In an opinion survey of American Jews, commissioned by the Jewish Electorate Institute following the 2021 crisis, 22 percent agreed that "Israel is committing genocide against the Palestinians," and Matt Boxer in The Forward noted that the poll may have underestimated the percentage of American Jews who have a critical view of Israel because it undercounted secular Jews, who tend to be less attached to Israel. Conversely, the accusation of genocide during this period was rejected as "ridiculous" and "baseless" by several Jewish and Israeli human rights lawyers, including some who had accused Israel of apartheid.

==== Gaza genocide ====
The Gaza genocide is the ongoing, intentional, and systematic destruction of the Palestinian people in the Gaza Strip carried out by Israel during the Gaza war. It encompasses mass killings, including the targeted killing of children (who account for 30% of those killed), deliberate starvation, infliction of serious bodily and mental harm, and prevention of births. Israel maintains a blockade on the Gaza Strip, restricting Gazans' freedom of movement and access to outside aid. The Israel Defense Forces have destroyed civilian infrastructure, including educational, religious, and cultural sites and healthcare facilities, and killed healthcare workers and aid-seekers. Palestinians in Gaza also face forced mass displacement and sexual violence. The genocide has been recognized, in either a legal or scholarly sense, by a United Nations special committee and commission of inquiry, the International Association of Genocide Scholars, multiple human rights groups, (Note: Amnesty International, Médecins Sans Frontières, B'Tselem, Physicians for Human Rights–Israel, International Federation for Human Rights.) state governments, numerous genocide studies and international law scholars, and other experts.

As of October 2026, at least 74,500 people in Gaza had been killed. The vast majority of the victims were civilians, and around 50% were women and children. Compared to other recent global conflicts, the numbers of known deaths of journalists, humanitarian and health workers, and children are among the highest. Thousands more uncounted bodies are thought to be under the rubble of destroyed buildings. A study in the medical journal The Lancet estimated that traumatic injury deaths were undercounted by June 2024, while noting an even larger potential death toll with indirect deaths included. The number of injured is greater than 174,000. Gaza has the most child amputees per capita in the world; the Gaza war caused more than 21,000 children to be disabled. In July 2025, 18,457 children were listed among the war dead by health authorities in Gaza, excluding indirect deaths and those buried under rubble. Several media critics, including Robin Anderson, accused traditional media of underreporting the killing of children in Gaza; of 1,100 articles studied by Adam Johnson, only two had the word "children" in the headline.

An Israeli blockade heavily contributed to starvation and confirmed famine. In August 2025, about 641,000 people experienced catastrophic levels of food insecurity. Early in the conflict, Israel cut off Gaza's water and electricity. It later partially restored the water. As of October 2025, 94% of Gaza's health centres had been destroyed or damaged. Israel also destroyed numerous cultural heritage sites, including all 12 of Gaza's universities, and 80% of its schools. Over 1.9 million Palestinians—85% of Gaza's population—were forcibly displaced. Israel's bombing has also caused severe environmental devastation across the territory.

In December 2023, the government of South Africa instituted proceedings, South Africa v. Israel, against Israel at the International Court of Justice (ICJ), alleging a violation of the Genocide Convention. In January 2024, the court ordered Israel to take all measures within its power to prevent the commission of acts of genocide, to prevent and punish incitement to genocide, and to allow basic humanitarian service, aid and supplies into Gaza. The court later ordered Israel to increase humanitarian aid into Gaza and to halt its Rafah offensive. Israel did not fully comply with the court's orders. Separately, in November 2024, the International Criminal Court (ICC) issued arrest warrants for Benjamin Netanyahu and Yoav Gallant for war crimes and crimes against humanity. (Note: The charges were the war crimes of starvation of civilians as a weapon of war, willfully causing great suffering or serious injury to body or health, willful killing or murder and intentionally directing attacks against a civilian population, as well as extermination and/or murder, persecution and "other inhumane acts" as crimes against humanity.) In response, the United States imposed sanctions on the ICC in February 2025.

Palestinians have emphasized the relationship between the Gaza genocide and Zionist political violence, describing it as a continuation of the Nakba and its ongoing effects. Israel and its supporters maintain that its actions do not constitute genocide, that they are a response to the October 7 attacks, and that Israel's aim has been to destroy Hamas and free Israeli hostages. (Note: All living captives were released by 13 October 2025. The remains of the last remaining captive were recovered on 26 January 2026.) There is increasing consensus among genocide and international legal scholars on the genocide assessment, although some academics and countries challenge it.

Israel has been accused of attacking Palestinians using collective punishment, forced displacement (ethnic cleansing), airstrikes (including in refugee camps), famine, and rape and sexual violence since October 2023, as well as the deliberate and systematic infliction of life-threatening conditions by military siege.

===== Forcible population transfer =====
Israel's evacuation order was characterized as a forcible population transfer by Jan Egeland, the Norwegian former diplomat involved with the Oslo Accord. A "forcible transfer" is the forced relocation of a civilian population as part of an organized offense against it and is considered a crime against humanity by the International Criminal Court. In an interview with the BBC, Egeland stated, "There are hundreds of thousands of people fleeing for their life — [that is] not something that should be called an evacuation. It is a forcible transfer of people from all of northern Gaza, which according to the Geneva Convention is a war crime." UN Special rapporteur Francesca Albanese warned of a mass ethnic cleansing in Gaza. Raz Segal, an Israeli historian and director of the Holocaust and Genocide Studies program at Stockton University, termed it a "textbook case of genocide." A leaked policy paper from the Israeli Ministry of Intelligence, a junior ministry that conducts research but does not set policy, suggested a permanent expulsion of the population of Gaza into Egypt, which has been described as an endorsement of ethnic cleansing; the Israeli government downplayed the report as a hypothetical "concept paper". Transfer is a topic of discussion and disagreement within Israel's government with some expressly calling for permanent expulsion of Palestinians from Gaza.

A March 2025, report by the United Nations Commission on Human Rights accused Israel of sexual violence and "genocidal acts", concluding it had committed the crime against humanity of extermination.

=== West Bank violence ===
During the Israeli occupation of the West Bank, Israel and settlers have committed violence against Palestinians, forcibly displacing and killing them. A Palestinian activist said that the settler violence was the "tip of the iceberg" of the system that he described as genocidal and apartheid. During the Gaza war, settler violence and Israeli raids heavily increased. Eitay Mack, an Israeli human rights activist, wrote in the Middle East Eye that the Huwara rampage constituted a pogrom and incitement to genocide. The Adalah Justice Project similarly said that Israeli officials' rhetoric before the attack was genocidal. The Lemkin Institute for Genocide Prevention stated that Israeli actions in the West Bank during the war were genocide. UN Special Rapporteur Francesca Albanese has detailed how the actions of Israel in the West Bank mirror those that have occurred in Gaza, seeking to ethnically cleanse the territory and that this "amounts to a genocidal campaign to erase Palestinians as a people".

== Debate ==
=== Conceptions of genocide ===
Genocide is the intentional destruction of a people (Note: Usually defined as an ethnic, national, racial, or religious group.) in whole or in part. The term was coined and first defined in the 1940s by legal scholar, Raphael Lemkin. It is legally defined in the United Nations Genocide Convention of 1948. Academics define it in a range of ways.

According to Yair Auron, from 1948 to 2008, researchers did not analyse the Israel–Palestine conflict in terms of the concept of genocide, but discussion subsequently began. In 2017 Auron stated that he expected increasing discussion over time regarding the concept of a Palestinian genocide.

=== Legal cases ===
Allegations have been made against Israel in relation to the five acts mentioned in the UN Convention at various times:

- Israel has been accused of killing Palestinians. In South Africa's suit against Israel at the International Court of Justice, prosecutors recognised the mass killing of Palestinians in Gaza since 2023.
- Israel has been accused of causing Palestinians serious bodily and mental harm. Among the attack types utilised by Israel against the Palestinians are psychological warfare during the Nakba, and rape and sexual violence during the Nakba and the Gaza war.
- Israel has been accused of imposing living conditions intended to destroy Palestinians as a group. Following the Sabra and Shatila massacre in 1982, an independent commission headed by Seán MacBride investigated reported violations of International Law by Israel and four of its six members concluded that "the deliberate destruction of the national and cultural rights and identity of the Palestinian people amount[ed] to genocide". The Kuala Lumpur War Crimes Tribunal, a 'citizens' tribunal', in 2013 found Israel guilty of genocide for actions taken over the previous 67 years, agreeing with the prosecution that the "harsh conditions of life were deliberately inflicted to destroy" Palestinians.
- Israel has been accused of preventing Palestinian births in the Gaza Strip since 2023. The Palestinian Centre for Human Rights alleges that Israeli measures have been intended to prevent births. It lists such measures as: "lack of protection from military attacks, poor health services and unsafe access to healthcare, restricted access to adequate food and dire living conditions elevating risks during pregnancy." It notes that "[a]ll these violations have increased miscarriages among pregnant women, preterm labors and stillbirths while many of them fear maternal mortality or stillbirth due to lack of healthcare and ignoring their special needs." In South Africa's suit against Israel at the International Court of Justice, prosecutors noted the Israeli imposition of measures preventing Palestinian births through the destruction of essential health services vital for the survival of pregnant women and their babies. The suit read that all of such actions were "intended to bring about their [Palestinians] destruction as a group".
- Israel has been accused of forcibly transferring children from Palestinian groups. Independent organisation Defence for Children International – Palestine (DCIP) has stated that since 2000, the Israeli military has detained some 13,000 Palestinian children, almost all boys between the ages of 12 and 17. Miranda Cleland, a DCIP advocacy officer, stated: "Everywhere a Palestinian child turns, there is the Israeli military to exert some kind of control over their life". Based on collected affidavits from 766 children detained between 2016 and 2022, DCIP found approximately 59% had been abducted by soldiers at night. 75% of children were subjected to physical violence and 97% were interrogated without a family member or lawyer present. One quarter are placed in solitary confinement for two or more days even before the beginning of a trial. Palestinian human rights group Addameer has concluded that throwing stones is the most frequent charge against Palestinian minors detained in the West Bank, punishable by up to 20 years in prison under Israeli military law. The Geneva-based Euro-Mediterranean Human Rights Monitor notes that the Israeli army has abducted Palestinian children and transferred them out of Gaza. It stated: "Numerous testimonies that the rights group has received say that the Israeli army regularly detains and transfers Palestinian children without disclosing their whereabouts".

=== Academic debate ===
According to a May 2024 report by the University Network for Human Rights, "actions taken by Israel's government and military in and regarding Gaza following the Hamas attacks of October 7, 2023, constitute breaches of the international law prohibitions on the commission of genocide." Human rights lawyer Susan Akram, commenting on the report and on the resistance to labeling Israel's actions as genocide, said, "The opposition is political, as there is consensus amongst the international human rights legal community, many other legal and political experts, including many Holocaust scholars, that Israel is committing genocide in Gaza".

==== Debate on pre-2023 events ====
In 2010, political science professor Martin Shaw argued that the elimination of the majority of Palestinian Arab society in Israel in 1948 constituted genocide. Shaw opined that the scope of genocide is not restricted to human annihilation, instead he recommends an "international historical perspective" that focuses on the aims of genocide and defines "genocidal violence" as widespread destructive measures aimed at civilians. With the broadened definition of genocide, Shaw contends that the 1948 Nakba was partially genocidal with regard to Palestinian society: with "specific genocidal thrusts developed situationally and incrementally, through local as well as national decisions ... a partly decentered, networked genocide, developing in interaction with the Palestinian and Arab enemy, in the context of war". Shaw further detailed this in 2013, in the context of arguments that since a relatively low number of Palestinian Arabs were killed in the Nakba compared to those expelled it could not be considered a genocide, where Shaw draws on Lemkin's definitions of societal destruction being the definition of genocide, which does not necessitate the annihilation of individuals in the group, and points to how this is the more common form of genocide observed in the literature. In response to Shaw's 2010 article, psychologist and genocide scholar Israel Charny detailed how he believed Israel's actions in the Nakba were ethnic cleansing and involved genocidal massacres, it was overall genocide.

In 2010, in considering the case of Palestinians in Gaza, historian and sociologist Uğur Ümit Üngör pointed to the extreme asymmetrical nature of violent conflict as the core element of genocidal dynamics, which he found present in the history of Israel and Palestine.

Human rights scholars Haifa Rashed and Damien Short have voiced their belief that Lemkin's original concept of genocide can be used to analyse "the historical and continuing, cultural and physical, destructive social and political relations involved in the Israel/Palestine conflict". In a separate publication, Rashed, Short, and John Docker argued that the conflict did not receive enough attention in the field of genocide studies, as the academic "field fears Zionist intimidation and ad hominem attack". The trio raised the possible argument of the ongoing "Zionist project as a structural settler-colonial genocide against the Palestinian people". The trio stated: "Discriminatory land and planning policies" could be viewed using the lens of a government repressing "minority rights" of Palestinian Israelis, but this "does not preclude individual victims experiencing this as genocidal". This conception has also been supported by other academics. Historian Lawrence Davidson, in his book about cultural genocide, included a chapter about the Israeli–Palestinian conflict.

Some academics who support the case of genocide view the treatment of Palestinians by Israel over the past century as moving between repressive and destructive policies, with Rosemary Sayigh describing it as a continuing state of repression punctuated with "spasms of genocidal violence".

Michael Sfard, an Israeli human rights lawyer who argued on behalf of Yesh Din that Israel is committing the crime of apartheid, said in 2021 that Israel's policy against the Palestinians did not meet the genocide threshold and the accusation cheapened the concept.

Political sociologist Ronit Lentin wrote in 2010 that the 1948 Nakba was not "genocide", but ethnic cleansing or "spaciocide". Derek Penslar, a professor of Israel Studies at the University of Oxford, opined in 2013 that Palestinians suffered "ethnic cleansing" during the Nakba, but "not a genocide", as Penslar said that the latter "means that you wipe out a people"; Rashed, Short, and Docker wrote that "Penslar mistakenly interprets the concept of genocide."

Earlier, historian Ilan Pappé in 2006 and genocide scholar Mark Levene in 2007 both stated that the Nakba in 1948 was "ethnic cleansing", without stating that it was "genocide", with Levene stating that Pappé's research on the Nakba "demands the attention of readers and researchers engaged with the subject of genocide and its suboptimal variants", with the Nakba being "of ongoing relevance – just as much as the Armenian genocide". John Docker argued in 2010 that while Pappé does not label the Nakba as a genocide, when reviewing the evidence and argumentation presented in Pappé's 2006 book The Ethnic Cleansing of Palestine, it aligns with Lemkin's conceptualisation of genocide. Pappé would in 2006 and 2007 describe the killings of Palestinians by Israel in Gaza during 2006 as "genocide", and in 2009 he described the 2009 Gaza War as "genocide", decrying that the "genocidal operations" are being treated as "unconnected to anything that happened in the past and not associated with any ideology or system". Pappé in 2013 cited a speech by Israel's Prime Minister Shimon Peres that year as having failed to recognize the existence of Palestinians in the history of Israel, which to Pappé "is the point where ethnic cleansing becomes genocidal. When you are eliminated from the history book and the discourse of the top politicians".

Political scientist Ian Lustick in 2006 described the Nakba as "the expulsion of Palestinians from their homes and refusal to allow them to return", and stated that "It was a tragic and unjust and opportunistically accelerated unfolding of the logic of circumstances, not a genocidal campaign." Patrick Wolfe, in a 2006 article analyzing the relationship and differences between settler colonialism and genocide, discussed the example of Palestinians who "threw rocks [at Israelis] and died for their efforts", and further described Palestinians as becoming "more and more dispensable", with Gaza and the West Bank becoming increasingly like Indian reservations or even like the Warsaw Ghetto.

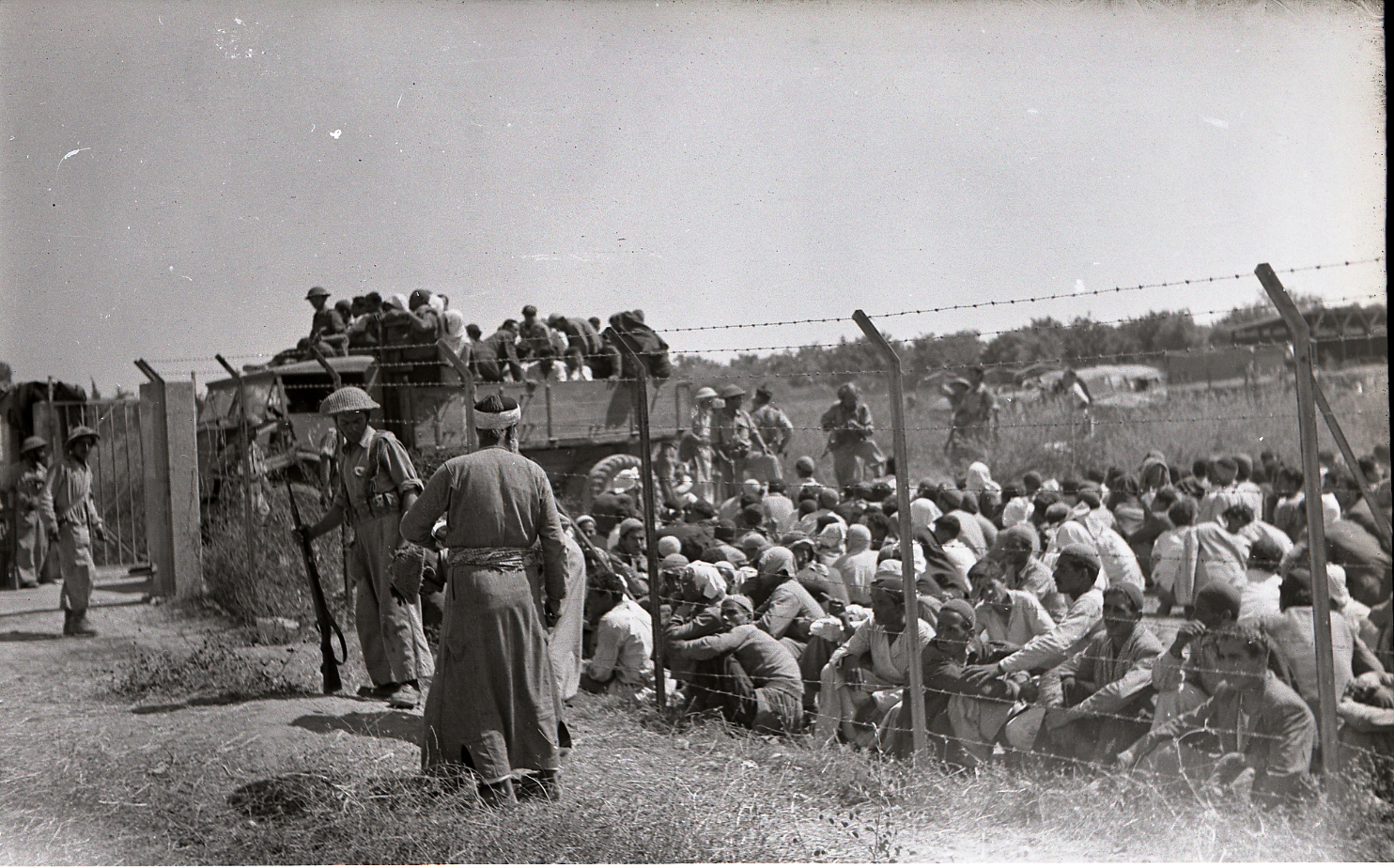
Palestinian men, behind barbed wire fence, before being expelled. Ramle, 10 July 1948

Nur Masalha in 2012 argued that the Nakba was both "politicide" ("dissolution of the Palestinian people's existence as a legitimate social, political and economic entity") and "cultural genocide" ("destruction and elimination of the cultural pattern of a group, including language, local traditions, ... monuments, place names, landscape, historical records ... in brief, the shrines of the soul of a nation"), with strategies for "de-Arabisation of the land" including new Hebrew names for places replacing Palestinian names, and planting forests over destroyed Palestinian villages.

Yair Auron in 2017 analyzed the 1948 Nakba using the definition of genocide from the 1948 United Nations Genocide Convention (as any other definition would result in "complete chaos" according to Auron), concluding that "Israel committed ethnic cleansing but not a genocide", thus arguing that the underlying aim of the Nakba was not to kill Palestinians, but to "get rid of them, and in doing so, [the Israelis] commit massacres", noting the expulsion of people from over 400 villages. According to Auron, ethnic cleansing is one of the "elements of genocide", though "not an act of genocide". Auron differentiates massacres in genocides as being "part of the comprehensive plan", while massacres in ethnic cleansing are "localized and usually stem from hatred or vengeance". Auron noted that the claim that the 1948 Nakba was genocide has been increasingly advanced by Palestinians, and is also promoted by some European and North American scholars.

Auron argues that there are four main factors why he did not consider 1948 as a genocide against Palestinians: (1) the Arabs initiated the war, resulting in Israel experiencing "critical existential combat" for several weeks; (2) Israel had no "intention of annihilating" a social group; (3) generally, perpetrators of genocide have at least near-absolute force superiority, which Israel did not have; (4) despite "slurs", there was no "racist ideology" towards Palestinians, exemplified by Israeli groups like Hashomer living similarly to Bedouins.

Bashir Bashir and Amos Goldberg in 2018 described the Nakba as part of "the same modern and global history of genocide and ethnic cleansing" as the Holocaust; although the events differed in "degree of murderousness", they shared a "common global framework of violence created by strong nationalism combined with imperial and colonial ideology and policies", with the Nakba involving the attempt to "de-Arabize and ethnic-cleanse Palestine". Meanwhile, Alon Confino in 2018 contrasted the "genocide" of the Holocaust with the "ethnic cleansing" of the Nakba, describing the latter as aimed at "removing, not annihilating, an ethnic group". Jerome Slater in 2020 described the Nakba as "ethnic cleansing" due to the "forced expulsions" of Palestinians, but also said that "no genocide" occurred due to around 150,000 Palestinians remaining in Israel at the end of the war, who "were allowed to remain there".

Cary Nelson in 2019 stated that the notion of Israel having "engaged in genocide" was "unwarranted slander", and suggested that some people repeat it out of ignorance, just as those who repeated the blood libel about Jews poisoning the wells in Europe did. Nelson further described the accusation of Israel having "genocidal designs on Palestinians" as "false", and the accusation of Israel committing "incremental genocide" in Gaza as "malicious". Nelson described a phenomenon where academics "say publicly that Israel is a settler-colonialist, genocidal, racist, and apartheid state"; Nelson recommends that these allegations should be presented to higher education students "as debatable", instead of being "commonly" presented as facts.

In a 2019 interview, Benny Morris stated that in his view, what happened to Palestinians in 1948 was not a genocide. Morris had written in an earlier 2016 opinion article that the events of 1948 also did not amount to an ethnic cleansing.

Marouf Hasian Jr. in 2020 stated the Nakba exemplified a situation where "empowered decisions-makers are reluctant to call some historical incidents colonial genocides", while "many Palestinian and other Arab writers" have compared the Nakba to "colonial genocides". Hasian describes that some "Israelis worry that al-Nakba consciousness-raising threatens state legitimacy", while "many Israeli supporters" do not consider the Nakba as any form of genocide, instead arguing that there was "spontaneous Arab Palestinian fleeing that was based on calls from neighboring Arab nations". Hasian concludes that "public deliberation, and political events" caused "so many" people to attempt to separate the 1948 Nakba from "the 'real' genocides". Hasian further highlighted how restrictive "Auschwitz-centered, or Lemkin-like ways" of defining genocide was preventing consideration of the Nakba as genocide.

Academics, such as Clare Brandabur and Mohammed Nijim, argue for considering not just specific events in the determination of whether Palestinians have been subjected to genocide, but for the totality of their treatment since at least the Nakba. In Brandabur's article "Roadmap to Genocide", she argues that the sum of Israel's actions against Palestinians since the Nakba fit the definition of genocide as described by Lemkin in his book Axis Rule in Occupied Europe.

In 2024, historian Mark Levene labelled the mass destruction of infrastructure under Israel's Dahiya doctrine that had been implemented against Gaza since 2006, as urbicide and a tool of genocide. In a 2024 academic article, historian Yoav Di-Capua charts a history of increasing genocidal ideology among Hardal, building on Kahanist ideology. He identifies Bezalel Smotrich and Itamar Ben-Gvir as politicians who seek the adoption of the ideology of Hardal as national policy, and pointing to an increasing presence of Hardalim among the officers and soldiers of the IDF.

Palestinian legal scholar Rabea Eghbariah has argued in "Toward Nakba as a Legal Concept" for nakba to be understood as a legal concept on its own terms to describe the fragmented legal landscape Palestinians face as a consequence of Zionism and Israeli domination, with different yet overlapping elements including ethnic cleansing, apartheid, and genocide.

==== Debate on post-2023 events ====
In the context of the October 7 attacks, the Israeli counterattacks, and the imposed complete blockade, which included the denial of water and food to the civilian population, Israeli historian Raz Segal described it as a "textbook case of genocide" and connected it to the Nakba, the expulsion of Palestinians during the establishment of Israel in 1948. With other academics also detailing Israel's attacks on infrastructure, food, and water as being genocidal in nature, while others have described these actions as genocidal when Israel previously engaged in them prior to 2023.

Following the outbreak of the Gaza war in 2023 after the October 7 attacks, Israeli Holocaust historian Omer Bartov warned that statements made by high-ranking Israeli government officials "could easily be construed as indicating a genocidal intent". Bartov wrote that he believed that "there is no proof that genocide is currently taking place in Gaza", noting the distinctions between ethnic cleansing and genocide. However he called for "stop[ping] Israel from letting its actions become a genocide" and said that "[...] we may be watching an ethnic cleansing operation that could quickly devolve into genocide". In February 2024, Bartov told Anadolu: "There seems to be intentional destruction of housing. There is destruction of places of worship, especially of mosques. There's destruction of universities and schools, which seems to be intentional. They can certainly come under war crimes, it can come under crimes against humanity, and it can come under genocide". In April 2024, Amos Goldberg, professor of Holocaust History at the Hebrew University of Jerusalem, stated in an essay that: "Yes, it is genocide". He said: "It is so difficult and painful to admit it, but despite all that, and despite all our efforts to think otherwise, after six months of brutal war we can no longer avoid this conclusion." (Note: Originally published in Hebrew in Sikha Mekomit, Goldberg reiterated his view in a July 2024 interview with Elias Feroz in Jacobin.)

Historian Yoav Di-Capua believes that politicians, such as Smotrich and Ben-Gvir, are using the Gaza war to implement a plan to have the ideology of Hardal adopted as national policy in Israel.

In July 2025, a group of Israeli military historians from the right-leaning Begin–Sadat Center for Strategic Studies published a report titled Debunking the Genocide Allegations. The authors argue that available evidence does not demonstrate an Israeli policy or intent to destroy Gaza's Palestinian population. They dispute allegations of deliberate starvation, systematic civilian targeting, indiscriminate bombing, and commonly cited casualty statistics, claiming that weak source verification, circular citations, uncertain data, and an "inverse information funnel" have created a misleading appearance of independent confirmation. The report emphasizes Gaza's exceptionally difficult urban warfare conditions, Hamas's tunnels and use of civilian infrastructure, and Israeli warnings and evacuations, while acknowledging that individual attacks may have involved negligence, inadequate precautions, criminal conduct, or war crimes requiring investigation. It particularly criticizes the March 2025 suspension of humanitarian aid and highlights the killing of paramedics in Tel al-Sultan as a serious incident warranting scrutiny. Although challenging Gaza Health Ministry figures, it concedes that no definitive alternative casualty count is currently available. Ultimately, the authors recommend greater reliance on primary and forensic evidence, comparison of competing accounts, transparent acknowledgment of uncertainty, and caution in applying the term "genocide".

=== Legal debate ===
==== Before 2023 ====
There has been longstanding legal debate on whether a case can be made that Israel has violated the Genocide Convention, with American human rights lawyer Francis Boyle, the professor of international law at the University of Illinois College of Law, first suggesting that such a case should be brought to bear in 1998. Boyle's argument is that Israel has "ruthlessly implemented a systematic and comprehensive military, political, and economic campaign with the intent to destroy in substantial part the national, ethnic, racial and different religious (Muslim and Christian) group" of Palestinians.

The Kuala Lumpur War Crimes Tribunal, a 'citizens' tribunal', in 2013 found Israel guilty of genocide for actions taken over the previous 67 years, agreeing with the prosecution that the "harsh conditions of life were deliberately inflicted to destroy" Palestinians.

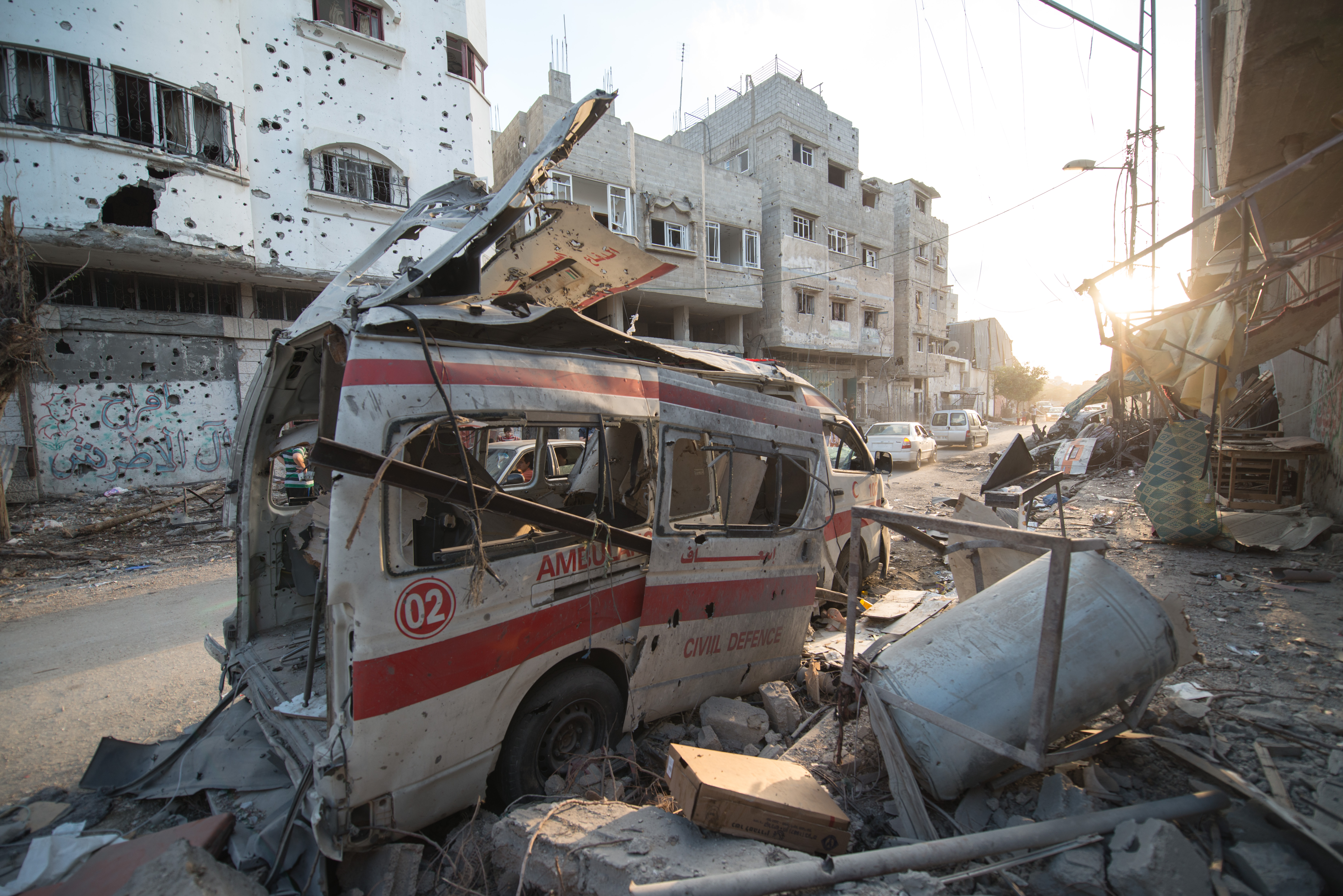
Ambulance destroyed in the neighborhood of Shuja'iyya in Gaza City during the 2014 Gaza War

The Russell Tribunal on Palestine, a 'people's tribunal', in response to the 2014 Gaza War held an extraordinary session where they determined Israel failed in its duties under the Genocide Convention to punish the direct crime of genocide and incitement to genocide.

Stephen Sedley, writing in 2018 in the London Review of Books, discussed a trip organized by the UK Foreign, Commonwealth and Development Office to Hebron to observe the Israeli army's treatment of Palestinian children, and wrote about how one of the first things they saw was graffiti on the door of a deserted Palestinian shop that said "Gas the Arabs". He remarked "Nobody, evidently, has a monopoly of genocidal abuse."

Since 2021, there has been an ongoing investigation of war crimes in Israel, Gaza, and the West Bank conducted by the International Criminal Court (ICC). On 9 November, Al Haq, Al Mezan Center for Human Rights, and the Palestinian Centre for Human Rights, filed a lawsuit with the ICC, calling for the inclusion of Israeli crimes against humanity, namely apartheid and genocide, in their ongoing investigation and for the arrest of Benyamin Netanyahu, Isaac Herzog, Yoav Gallant and others suspected of committing these crimes.

==== Since 2023 ====
On 9 November 2023, three Palestinian civil rights groups filed a lawsuit against Israel with the International Criminal Court. The groups charged Israel with war crimes, apartheid, and genocide, calling for the ICC to issue arrest warrants for significant Israeli officials. On 13 November, Defence for Children International, Al-Haq, and Palestinians living in Gaza and the United States, represented by the Center for Constitutional Rights, filed a lawsuit against Joe Biden, Antony Blinken, and Lloyd Austin for failure to prevent genocide, citing Israel's "mass killings," targeting of schools and hospitals, collective punishment, use of chemical weapons, forced expulsion, and blockage of food, water, electricity and other basic needs. The lawsuit seeks to enact an emergency order to end diplomatic and military aid to Israel for their international crimes. On 22 November, Euro-Med Monitor urged the United Nations to constitute Israel's actions in Gaza as genocide, investigate crimes against humanity, and take action to prevent any more death or destruction. On 22 December, Paula Gaviria Betancur, Special Rapporteur on the human rights of internally displaced persons (IDPs) warned that Israel's military operation in Gaza aimed to "deport the majority of the civilian population en masse" thus "repeating a long history of mass forced displacement of Palestinians by Israel".

On 28 January 2024, a conference on resettling Gaza was attended by 11 cabinet ministers and 15 coalition members of the Israeli Knesset which, according to the Guardian "'appears to violate the international court of justice ruling last week that Israel must "take all measures within its power" to avoid acts of genocide in its war in Gaza, including the "prevention and punishment of genocidal rhetoric.'"

In March 2024, the UN special rapporteur on the situation of human rights in the occupied Palestinian territories, Francesca Albanese, issued a report stating that there were "reasonable grounds to believe that the threshold indicating the commission" of acts of genocide had been met. Israel rejected the report.

===== South Africa's genocide case against Israel =====
Stances of states on South Africa's genocide case against Israel: South Africa Countries that have supported South Africa's case Countries that have opposed South Africa's case Israel

In December 2023, South Africa became the first country to file a suit against Israel at the International Court of Justice, accusing the state of committing genocide in Gaza in violation of the Genocide Convention. South Africa stated that "acts and omissions by Israel ... are genocidal in character, as they are committed with the requisite specific intent ... to destroy Palestinians in Gaza as a part of the broader Palestinian national, racial and ethnical group". Genocidal actions listed in the suit included the mass killing of Palestinians in Gaza, the destruction of their homes, their expulsion and displacement, (Note: There has been 1,900,000 internally displaced persons in the Gaza Strip since 7 October 2023) as well as the Israeli blockade on food, water and medical aid to the region. Additionally, South Africa noted the Israeli imposition of measures preventing Palestinian births through the destruction of essential health services vital for the survival of pregnant women and their babies. The suit read that all of such actions were "intended to bring about their [Palestinians] destruction as a group". South Africa also asserts that statements made by Israeli officials, such as Prime Minister Benjamin Netanyahu, have displayed "genocidal intent". A group of human rights organizations led by CODEPINK, World Beyond War, RootsAction and The People’s Forum supported South Africa in their suit.

===== Nicaragua v. Germany (Genocide Convention) =====
On 1 March 2024, Nicaragua instituted proceedings against Germany at the International Court of Justice (ICJ) under, inter alia, the Genocide Convention. These proceedings arose from Germany's support for Israel in the Gaza war. Imogen Saunders of the Australian National University wrote that Nicaragua's application was the "first ... to allege contribution to the act of genocide rather than the commission of the act itself".

=== Political perspectives ===
Positions of national governments on whether Israel is committing genocide in the Gaza war: Agree Disagree Unclear Defer to the ICJ's advisory opinion in the case South Africa v. Israel No data

Both Israel and Palestine frequently accuse the other of planning to commit genocide.

In late 2023, various global leaders and officials voiced their perspectives on the Israel-Gaza conflict, with many labeling Israel's actions in Gaza as "genocide." Iranian Foreign Minister Hossein Amir-Abdollahian, Pakistani Foreign Minister Jalil Abbas Jilani, the Taliban, Palestinian President Mahmoud Abbas, Venezuelan President Nicolás Maduro, and the Kurdistan Communities Union were among those who condemned Israel's actions. Palestinian-American U.S. Congresswoman Rashida Tlaib accused President Biden of supporting this "genocide," leading to a resolution for censure against her by the Republican caucus, sponsored by Marjorie Taylor Greene. On 4 November, Tlaib released a video in which she directly accused President Biden of supporting "the genocide of the Palestinian people". Craig Mokhiber from the UN High Commissioner for Human Rights resigned, criticizing the organization for its response to the Gaza war. A day after Colombia withdrew its ambassador from Israel, President Gustavo Petro posted on X in Spanish: "It's called genocide, they do it to remove the Palestinian people from Gaza and take it over. The head of the state who carries out this genocide is a criminal against humanity. Their allies cannot talk about democracy." Leaders from Turkey, Brazil, and Syria also condemned Israel's actions.

The international response continued with various nations expressing strong condemnation. The Honduran ministry of foreign affairs stated "Honduras energetically condemns the genocide and serious violations of international humanitarian law that the civilian Palestinian population is suffering in the Gaza Strip". South Africa recalled its diplomatic mission from Israel and criticized Israel's ambassador for disparaging those "opposing the atrocities and genocide of the Israeli government". South African President Cyril Ramaphosa accused Israel of war crimes and acts "tantamount to genocide" in Gaza. Iraqi Prime Minister Mohammed Al Sudani and Iranian President Ebrahim Raisi labeled the conflict a "genocide." Meanwhile, journalist Ishaan Tharoor highlighted that: "In protests around the world, in the corridors of the United Nations and in the angry chambers of social media, one word is getting louder and louder: genocide." with governments, UN rapporteurs, and scholars echoing this sentiment. The same month Jeremy Corbyn, former leader of the UK Labour Party, called for an International Criminal Court investigation.

UN experts reported that "grave violations" committed by Israeli forces against the Palestinians of Gaza "point to a genocide in the making" and cited evidence including "increasing genocidal incitement, overt intent to 'destroy the Palestinian people under occupation', loud calls for a 'second Nakba' in Gaza and the rest of the occupied Palestinian territory, and the use of powerful weaponry with inherently indiscriminate impacts, resulting in a colossal death toll and destruction of life-sustaining infrastructure."

Contrasting these views, Israel's Ambassador to the Philippines, Ilan Fluss, denied allegations of genocide, asserting Israel's efforts to minimize civilian casualties and target Hamas members. US national security advisor John Kirby stated that applying the term "genocide" to Israeli actions was "inappropriate," while emphasizing Hamas' stated intent "What Hamas wants, make no mistake about it, is genocide," explaining "They want to wipe Israel off the map".

In February 2024, law professor and United Nations special rapporteur on the right to food, Michael Fakhri, accused the state of Israel of being "culpable" of genocide, as according to Fakhri, firstly "Israel has announced its intention to destroy the Palestinian people, in whole or in part, simply for being Palestinian", and secondly Israel was denying food to Palestinians by halting humanitarian aid and "intentionally" destroying "small-scale fishing vessels, greenhouses and orchards in Gaza [...] We have never seen a civilian population made to go so hungry so quickly and so completely, that is the consensus among starvation experts. Israel is not just targeting civilians, it is trying to damn the future of the Palestinian people by harming their children."

=== Cultural discourse ===
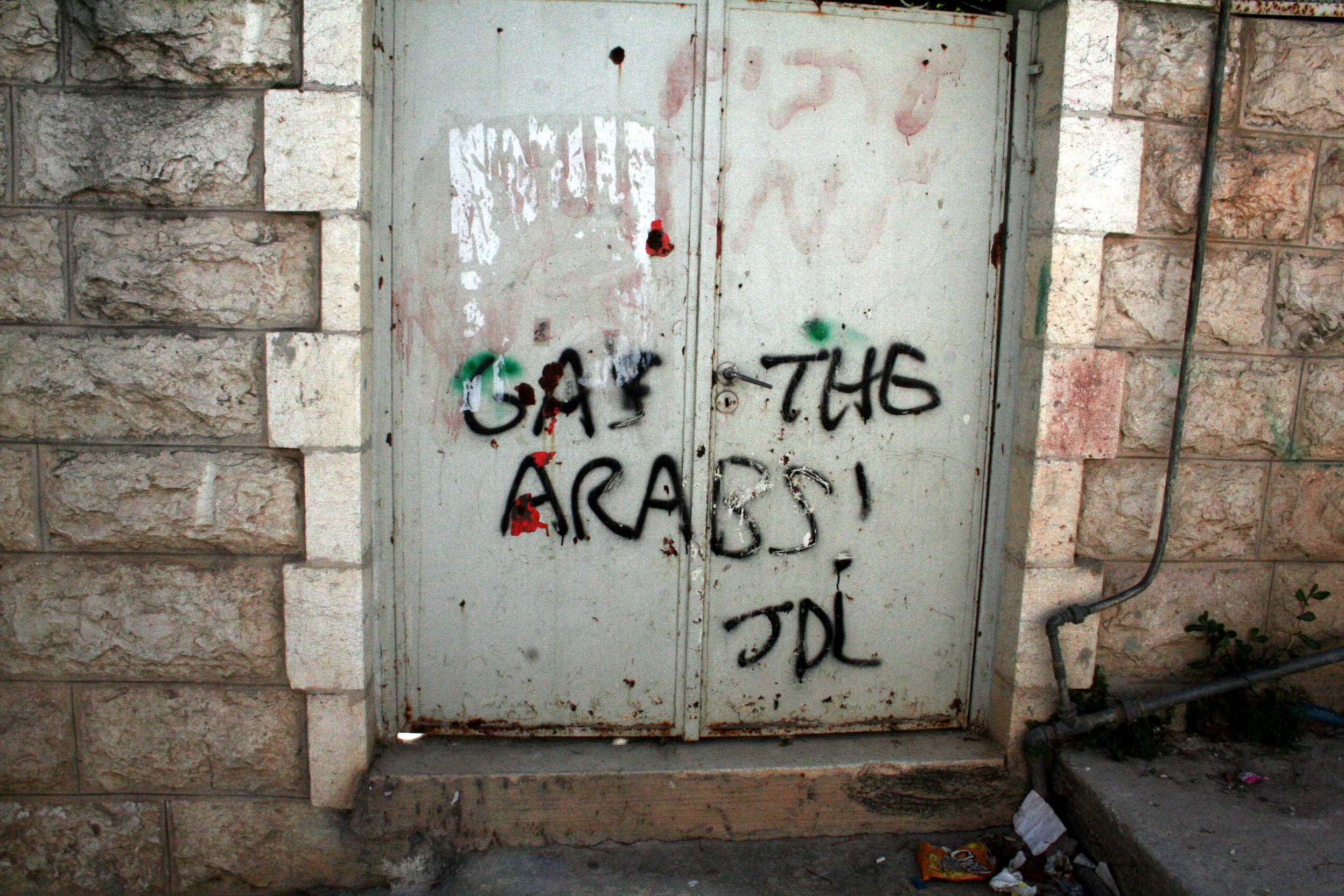
Graffiti in Hebron, in the Israeli-occupied West Bank, calling for the gassing of Arabs, above a tag for the right-wing group the Jewish Defense League

Statements of genocidal intent have long been a feature of the Israeli cultural landscape, not least in the chant or slogan of "Death to Arabs" – a regular invocation at far-right Israeli protests and marches, such at the annual march marking "Jerusalem Day".

In 2023, several high-profile individuals and groups voiced strong opinions on the Israel-Gaza conflict, with some labelling Israel's actions as genocide. Writer Jazmine Hughes left The New York Times after signing an open letter condemning Israel's actions in Gaza calling them "an attempt to conduct genocide". Musician Macklemore expressed his view that the conflict is a genocide at a rally in Washington. Feminist scholars Angela Davis and Zillah Eisenstein, among nearly 150 other signatories, signed an open letter which reads "We will not be silent when the bells of genocide ring. Silence is complicity." Mexican actress Melissa Barrera was reportedly fired from "Scream VII" for social media posts supporting Palestine and labelling Israel's actions as "genocide and ethnic cleansing".

Russian-American author Masha Gessen when asked if what was happening in Gaza was a genocide said, "I think there are some fine distinctions between genocide and ethnic cleansing and I think that there are valid arguments for using both terms". When pressed further they stated, "it is at the very least ethnic cleansing". This was followed soon after controversy surrounding Gessen's reception of the Hannah Arendt Prize over remarks in a New Yorker article critical of Israeli actions in the strip in which Gessen compared them to an Eastern European ghetto "being liquidated" by the Nazis. In December 2023, Olly Alexander, set to represent the United Kingdom in the Eurovision Song Contest 2024, signed a letter by the LGBT association Voices4London accusing Israel of genocide against Palestinians. This stance led to condemnation from the Israeli government and the Campaign Against Antisemitism (CAA), who asked the BBC to disallow Alexander's Eurovision participation. However, the BBC declined Israel's request, choosing not to sever ties with Alexander over his political views.

== Rhetoric ==
=== From Israeli officials ===
Those who have accused Israel of genocide have cited various statements made by Israeli government and military officials as evidence of intent to commit genocide. During the 2008–09 Gaza War, Israeli Defense Minister Matan Vilnai said: "The more Qassam [rocket] fire intensifies and the rockets reach a longer range, they will bring upon themselves a bigger Shoah because we will use all our might to defend ourselves." Colleagues said that his statement had meant "disaster" rather than "genocide".

Scholars, such as Mark Levene, Raz Segal, Luigi Daniele, and Shmuel Lederman, alongside news outlets such as AP News, have highlighted the increasing genocidal rhetoric in Israeli discourse since Benjamin Netanyahu's 2015 prime ministership. They specifically highlight comments from Bezalel Smotrich, Itamar Ben-Gvir, and Ayelet Shaked. Levene applied A. Dirk Moses' analysis that "absolute securitization lends itself to collective targeting of human groups, more precisely civilians, regardless of issues of ethnos or genos." Statements made by Israeli politicians during the 2023–24 Gaza War were cited by South Africa in its allegation at the International Court of Justice that Israel has committed genocide against the Palestinian people.

On 28 October 2023, Netanyahu said Israelis were "committed to completely eliminating this evil from the world" and added: "You must remember what Amalek has done to you, says our Holy Bible. And we do remember." The quotation refers to Deuteronomy 25:17 in the Hebrew Bible. (Note: "Remember what Amalek did unto thee by the way as ye came forth out of Egypt; how he met thee by the way, and smote the hindmost of thee, all that were enfeebled in thy rear, when thou wast faint and weary; and he feared not God. Therefore it shall be, when the Lord thy God hath given thee rest from all thine enemies round about, in the land which the Lord thy God giveth thee for an inheritance to possess it, that thou shalt blot out the remembrance of Amalek from under heaven; thou shalt not forget." (Deuteronomy 25:17–19, Jewish Publication Society of America Version) The phrase "Remember what Amalek did to you"(Hebrew: זכור את אשר עשה לך עמלק) is used in Holocaust memorials, including Yad Vashem and the Hague Jewish Monument.) Critics say Netanyahu's reference to Amalek alludes to an incident in 1 Samuel 15:3, in which God commands the Israelites to commit genocide against the Amalekites. (Note: "Now go and smite Amalek, and utterly destroy all that they have, and spare them not; but slay both man and woman, infant and suckling, ox and sheep, camel and ass." (1 Samuel 15:3, King James Version)) Noah Lanard of Mother Jones described the Amalek verses as among the most violent in the Bible and said they have a long history of being used by Israelis on the far-right, such as Baruch Goldstein, to justify killing Palestinians. Yair Rosenberg says the Deuteronomy verse refers to the need to remember an attack against the Jewish people. NPR issued a correction to indicate that Netanyahu had added a citation to Deuteronomy, rather than Samuel, in his speech, but added: "Both stories call for the Israelites to completely eliminate their attackers. In the Book of Deuteronomy, the text reads 'blot out the memory of Amalek from under heaven'."

On 9 October 2023, Israeli Defense Minister Yoav Gallant said Israel would launch a "complete siege" of Gaza, with plans to cut off electricity, food, water and fuel supplies, saying: "We are fighting human animals and will act accordingly." Gallant's statements were criticized as expressing genocidal intent towards Palestinians, and of calling for collective punishment of Gazan civilians. Israeli Minister of Finance Bezalel Smotrich stated that Israel had "returned Khan Yunis to the stone age".

Other Israeli figures whose statements on the 2023 war have been cited by accusers include Ariel Kallner, a Knesset member for Likud, who said Israel's sole goal was "A Nakba that will overshadow the Nakba of 1948", and IDF spokesman Daniel Hagari, who said Israeli forces would turn Gaza into a "city of tents" with the focus on "damage and not on accuracy". Amichay Eliyahu, a cabinet minister, and Tally Gotliv, a Likud parliament member, have called for Israel to use nuclear weapons on Gaza. Gotliv said: "It's time for a doomsday weapon. Not flattening a neighborhood. Crushing and flattening Gaza." Galit Distel-Atbaryan said that Israelis should focus on "Erasing all of Gaza from the face of the earth" and either forcing the Gazans into Egypt or killing them. Raz Segal said statements such as these represented a "textbook case of genocide": "If this is not special intent to destroy, I don't know what is." Anshel Pfeffer says that Benjamin Netanyahu has tolerated extreme rhetoric, including "apocalyptic threats and conspiracy theories", from his allies to serve his own personal political interests.

Ramzy Baroud of Arab News compared the rhetoric from Israeli officials with the language used in Rwanda ahead of the Rwandan genocide, such as the refrain by the Radio Television Libre des Mille Collines (RTLM) in Rwanda that Tutsis were "cockroaches" and a 1983 quote from former Israeli army chief of staff Rafael Eitan that Arabs are like "drugged cockroaches in a bottle". Journalist Chris McGreal, who won an Amnesty International Media Award for his reporting of the Rwandan genocide, also described the rhetoric against Palestinians as being "eerily familiar" to the rhetoric used against Tutsis.

On 14 November 2023, Israel's finance minister Bezalel Smotrich said he welcomed "the initiative of the voluntary emigration of Gaza Arabs to countries around the world". He said that "the State of Israel will no longer be able to accept the existence of an independent entity in Gaza". Critics, such as Palestinian National Initiative president Mustafa Barghouti, have likened the statement to a call for ethnic cleansing. The Palestinian Authority's Ministry of Foreign affairs accused Israel of engaging in a "genocide" supported by Smotrich. Likud Intelligence Minister Gila Gamliel said the international community should promote the "voluntary resettlement" of Palestinians in Gaza to sites around the globe. A Channel 12 survey reported that 44 percent of responders said they were in favor of a renewal of Jewish settlement in Gaza.

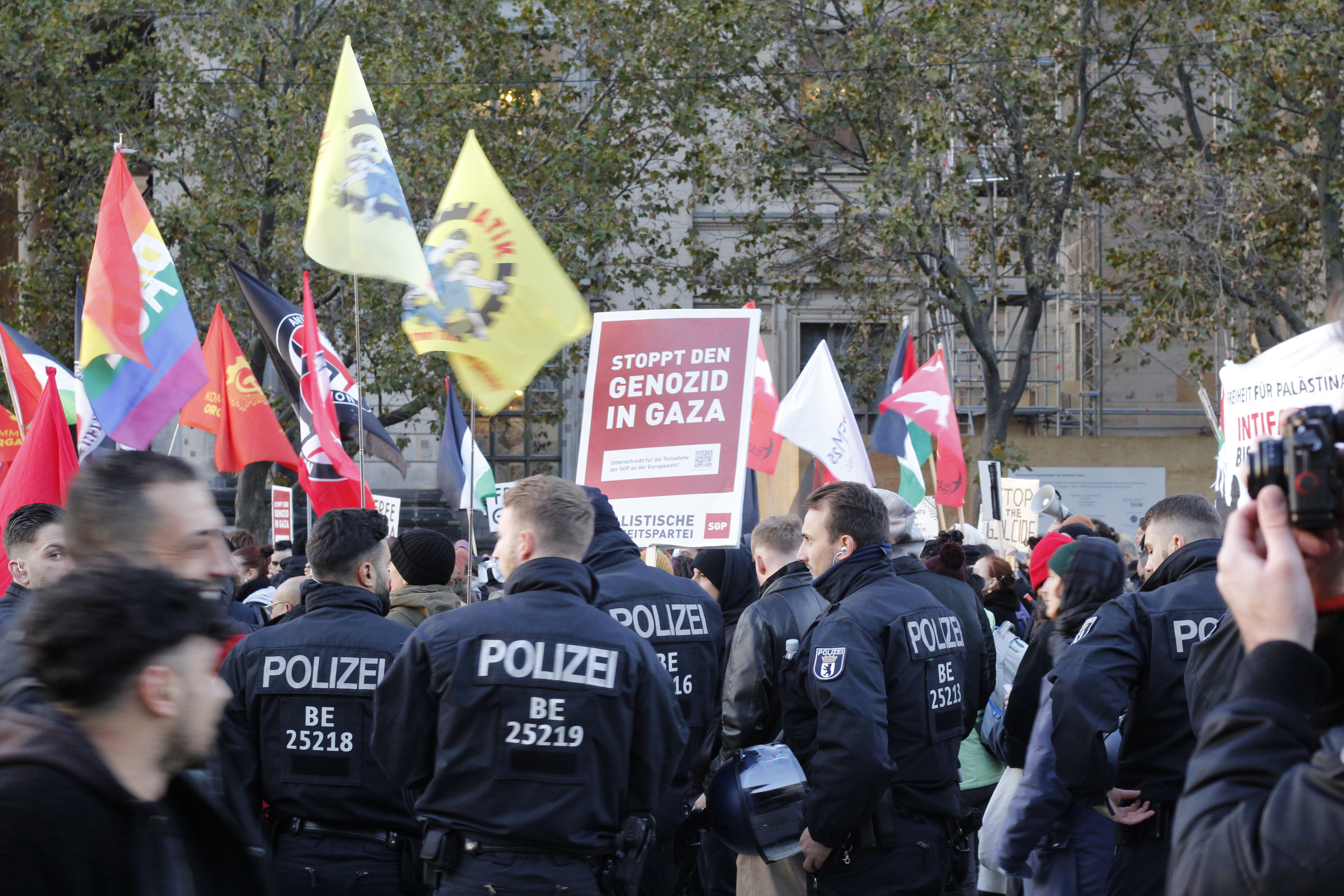
Protester in Berlin on 4 November 2023, holding a "Stop the Genocide in Gaza" sign

In November 2023, Israel's former justice minister, Ayelet Shaked, spoke of transforming Khan Younis into a soccer field with "the assistance of God and the IDF". He said Israel should pressure countries worldwide into accepting quotas of Gazan refugees, ranging from 20,000 to 50,000 per country. Otzma Yehudit MK Limor Son Har-Melech, said: "there is no escape from returning and fully controlling the Gaza Strip", including "extensive and flourishing settlement" across "the entire length and width of the strip". David Azoulay, the local council head of the town of Metula, said the people of Gaza should be transported to "Lebanon's shores where there are enough refugee camps". He said: "the entire Gaza Strip should be emptied and levelled flat, just like in Auschwitz. Let it become a museum, showcasing the capabilities of the State of Israel and dissuading anyone from living in the Gaza Strip" and "demonstrating the madness of the people who lived there". His statements were condemned by the Auschwitz-Birkenau State Museum.

=== From American officials since 2023 ===
In the Florida legislature, Democratic Representative Angie Nixon, supporting a ceasefire resolution early in the Gaza war, highlighted the high death toll of Palestinians questioning how many had to die before a ceasefire was called for, (Note: Around 10,000 Palestinians had been reported dead at the time of the debate.) Republican Representative Michelle Salzman replied instantly "All of them". Salzman's remark, perceived as a call for genocide, led to calls for censure or resignation from Nixon and the Florida chapter of the Council on American-Islamic Relations called for her to be censured or to resign. CAIR-Florida Executive Director Imam Abdullah Jaber said in a statement: "This chilling call for genocide by an American lawmaker is the direct result of decades of dehumanization of the Palestinian people by advocates of Israeli apartheid and their eager enablers in government and the media."

In October 2023, Republican Florida governor Ron DeSantis said "If you look at how [people in Gaza] behave, not all of them are Hamas, but they are all anti-Semitic" and called for a "swift and lethal response." Republican US Congressman Max Miller, on Fox News, stated that Palestine is "about to get eviscerated ... to turn that into a parking lot." He said there should be "no rules of engagement" during Israel's bombardment of Gaza. Miller also questioned the accuracy of the Gaza Health Ministry's claim that 10,000 people have been killed in Gaza, saying that he believes many of those killed have been "Hamas terrorists", not innocent civilians. Republican U.S. Representative Brian Mast compared all Palestinians to Nazis in November on the House floor, stating "I don’t think we would so lightly throw around the term 'innocent Nazi civilians' during World War II. It is not a far stretch to say there are very few innocent Palestinian civilians." On 31 January 2024, Mast said that Palestinian babies are not innocent civilians but "terrorists" who should be killed, that more infrastructure in Gaza needs to be destroyed, and "It would be better if you kill all the terrorists and kill everyone who are supporters."

Republican Tennessee representative Andy Ogles said "I think we should kill them all." Arkansas senator Tom Cotton remarked "As far as I’m concerned, Israel can bounce the rubble in Gaza." Michigan representative Tim Walberg said "We shouldn’t be spending a dime on humanitarian aid. It [Gaza] should be like Nagasaki and Hiroshima. Get it over quick." South Carolina senator Lindsey Graham called the genocide a "religious war" and said he sides with Israel, calling on it to do "whatever the hell you have to do to defend yourself; level the place." Florida representative Randy Fine called for Gaza to be nuked like Nagasaki and Hiroshima and made numerous statements endorsing genocide and starvation in Gaza, such as "There is no suffering adequate for these animals. May the streets of Gaza overflow with blood," "Release the hostages. Until then, starve away," "There is no starvation. Everything about the 'Palestinian' cause is a lie," and "Kill. Them. All. #NoMercy #BombsAway." Former presidential candidate in the 2024 Republican Party presidential primaries, Nikki Haley, wrote "finish them" on an Israeli bomb bound for Gaza.

Former Republican Representative Michele Bachmann appearing in December on The Charlie Kirk Show claimed all Palestinians were "clever assassins" and that they should be forcefully relocated to Iran. She received a round of applause from the audience, while Kirk replied that US policies should be more like those of the current Israeli government.

Ahmad Abuznaid, the executive director of the US Campaign for Palestinian Rights (USPCR) said that "There is a bipartisan effort to dehumanise the Palestinian people," referring especially to President Joe Biden voicing doubt over the accuracy of the Palestinian death count and attacks on Palestinian American Congresswoman Rashida Tlaib for her criticism of Israel's military offensive.

== Responses to the accusation ==
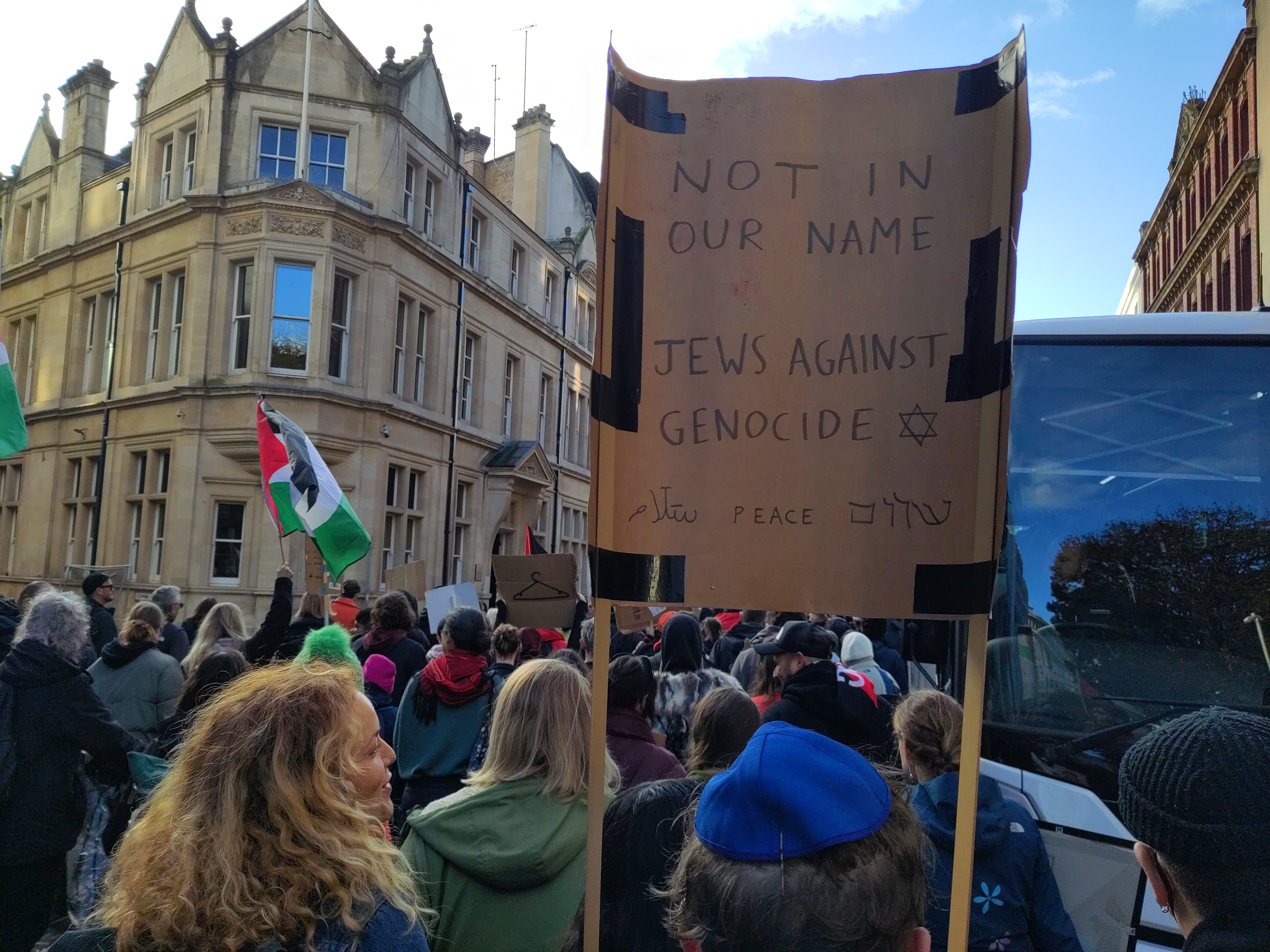
A protester holds a poster stating "Not in our name, Jews against genocide," at a pro-Palestine march in Bristol, United Kingdom, 4 November 2023

The accusation of genocide has been largely rejected by Israelis. Despite most Israelis rejecting the accusation of genocide, some Israelis and many in the Jewish diaspora – including several Holocaust survivors – have protested against the Israeli government, claiming that such accusations are true.

Historian Simon Sebag Montefiore says that "Jews are now accused of the very crimes they themselves have suffered [...] when no genocide has taken place or been intended", with the effect that the word has "been so devalued by its metaphorical abuse that it has become meaningless". In 2015, sociologist David Hirsh said there has never been a genocide of Palestinians, and that there was no evidence of genocide in Gaza. Hirsh says that accusations of genocide against Israel – whether in Gaza, the West Bank, or Lebanon – are commonly made by anti-Zionists to demonize Israel and "oversimplify the complex dynamics of the Israeli-Palestinian conflict". Zionist history professor Robert S. Wistrich says the genocide accusation is "purely fictional".

U.S. Secretary of State Antony Blinken has called the genocide accusation against Israel "meritless". U.S. Democratic Party Representative Ritchie Torres calls the characterisation "blood libel". Conservative American radio talk show host Dennis Prager says that characterising the conflict as a genocide against the Palestinians is antisemitic.

In May 2024, NYU Langone Health fired Hesen Jabr, a Muslim Palestinian-American nurse, after she called Israel's actions in Gaza "genocide" during an award acceptance speech.

== Victims ==
=== Deaths ===
Israeli and Palestinian deaths preceding the Gaza war in 2023. Most were civilians.

Ilan Pappé reported in 2008 that since the year 2000 "almost 4,000 Palestinians have been killed by Israeli forces, half of them children, and more than 20,000 wounded." (Note: Most of these occurred during the Second Intifada where, from 29 September 2000 to 1 January 2005, 3,179–3,354 Palestinians were killed.) According to data from the United Nations Office for the Coordination of Humanitarian Affairs, 6,735 Palestinians had been killed from 1 January 2008, to 6 October 2023. (Note: 1,116–1,417 Palestinian deaths in the Gaza War (2008–2009). 2,125–2,310 Palestinian deaths in the 2014 Gaza War. 250+ Palestinian deaths in the 2021 Israel–Palestine crisis.)

==== During the Gaza war ====
During the ongoing Gaza war, which began on 7 October 2023, a Reliefweb report released 18 November 2023, which labels Israel's actions in Gaza as a genocide, reported that 15,271 Palestinians in Gaza had been killed, 32,310 Palestinians had been injured, and an estimated 41,500 were unaccounted for. Multiple news and academic outlets have subsequently reported on updated figures, with at least 20,000 Palestinians having been killed in Gaza, an estimated 70% of whom were women and children. Per the Gaza Health Ministry and Government Information Office by 3 January 2024, over 22,300 people had been confirmed dead. About 7,000 people are missing, likely buried under the rubble. Over 52,000 have been wounded.

Indirect Palestinian deaths from disease in Gaza are expected to be much higher due to the intensity of the conflict, destruction of health care infrastructure, lack of food, water, shelter, and safe places for civilians to flee, and reduction in UNRWA funding; 186,000 Palestinians or more may have died as a result of the conflict according to a July 2024 conservative estimate by Rasha Khatib, Martin McKee, and Salim Yusuf published in The Lancet. Michael Spagat criticized their methodology, saying that the projection "lacks a solid foundation and is implausible". Even so, Spagat allowed it was "fair to call attention to the fact that not all of the deaths are going to be direct violent ones" and has called the death toll in Gaza "staggeringly high".

=== Displacement ===
In 1948, more than 700,000 Palestinians – about half of prewar Mandatory Palestine's Arab population – fled from their homes or were expelled by Zionist militias and, later, the Israeli army during the 1948 Palestine war.

Since the beginning of the Gaza war, nearly 2 million people have been displaced within the Gaza Strip.

== Alleged international complicity since 2023 ==
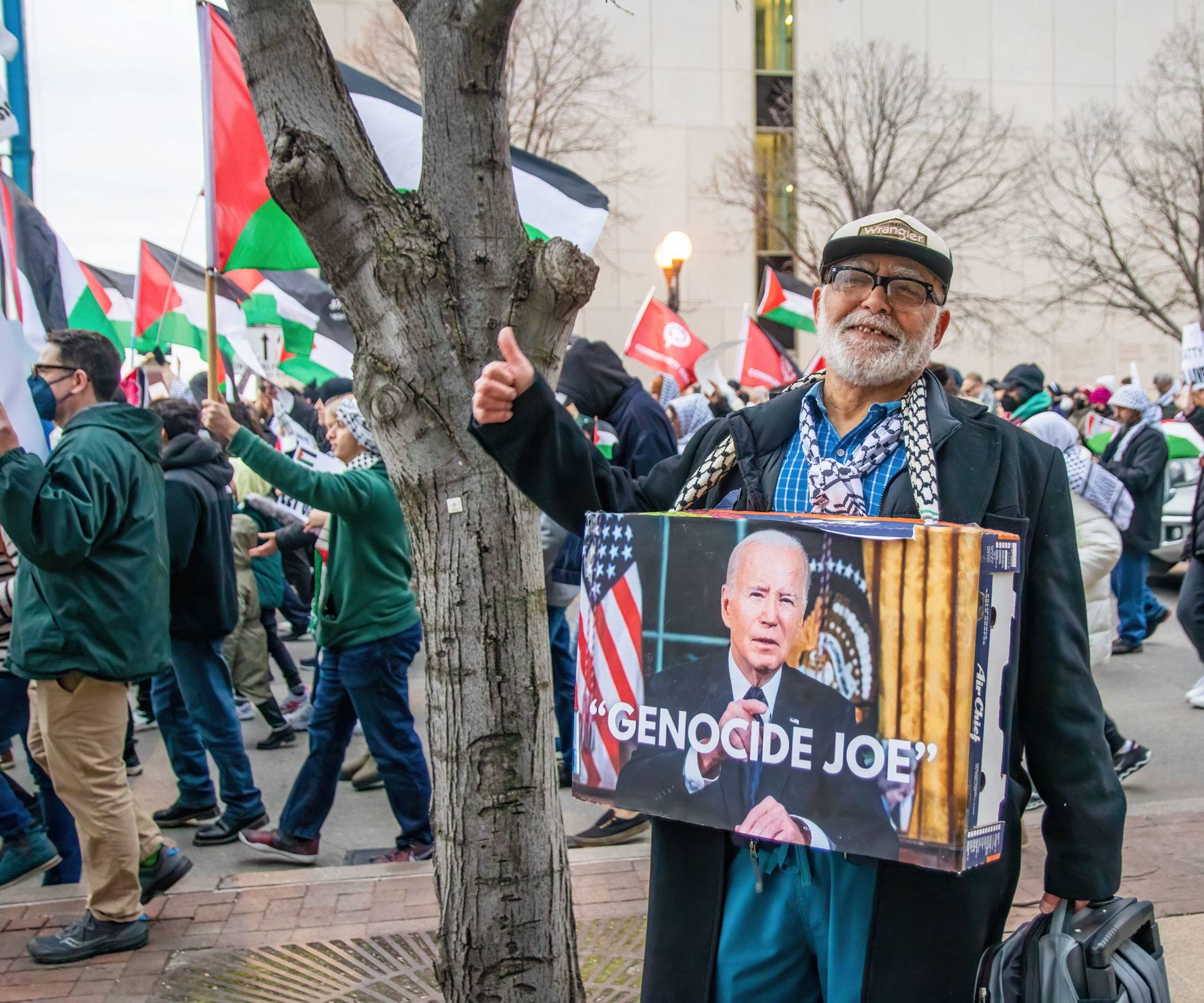
A protestor in Columbus, Ohio, carrying a sign referring to United States President Joe Biden as "Genocide Joe", 22 December 2023

All UN states that are signatories to the Genocide Convention are obliged "to employ all means reasonably available to them, so as to prevent genocide so far as possible" and must not provide "means to enable or facilitate the commission of the crime". Multiple scholars argue that the inaction of the international community to confirmed atrocities in Gaza expose the irrelevance and weakness of the Responsibility to Protect (R2P) doctrine. Many Western countries — especially the United States, Germany, and the United Kingdom — support Israel by offering diplomatic, military, and intelligence support. Some journalists, scholars, commentators, and UN officials say the actions of Western countries make them complicit in genocide.

U.S. National Security Council spokesman John Kirby, described by Israeli media outlet Ynet as "an exceptionally accomplished Israeli advocate", said "Israel's trying to defend itself against a genocidal terrorist threat. So if we're going to start using that word, fine, let's use it appropriately". On 13 November 2023, the New York-based Center for Constitutional Rights sued Biden for allegedly failing in his duties, defined under national and international laws, to prevent Israel committing genocide in Gaza in the Gaza war. The complaint alleged that Israel's "mass killings", targeting of civilian infrastructure and forced expulsions amounted to genocide. In a declaration in the lawsuit, genocide scholar William Schabas said that in his view there was a "serious risk of genocide" and that the US was "in breach of its obligation" under the 1948 Genocide Convention and international law. In January 2024 a federal judge dismissed the case Defense for Children International – Palestine et al v. Biden et al, saying the Constitution prevents his court from determining foreign policy, which is reserved to the political branches of U.S. government, though he would have preferred to have issued the injunction and urged President Biden to rethink U.S. policy, writing "it is plausible that Israel's conduct amounts to genocide." In February 2024, the Lemkin Institute for Genocide Prevention stated the Biden Administration was complicit in the alleged Gaza genocide. Ali Harb wrote that the US has continued to arm and fund the Israeli military while it conducts a genocide. In February 2024, following a U.S. veto of a UN ceasefire resolution, Cuban president Miguel Diaz-Canel Bermudez stated, "They are accomplices of this genocide of Israel against Palestine".

In February 2024 lawyers representing Palestinians in Germany filed a criminal complaint against various senior politicians including Olaf Scholz, Annalena Baerbock, Robert Habeck, and Christian Lindner for "aiding and abetting" the genocide in Gaza. On 1 March 2024, Nicaragua instituted proceedings against Germany at the ICJ under the Genocide Convention, concerning Germany's support for Israel in the Gaza war.

In March 2024, Australian Prime Minister Anthony Albanese, Foreign Minister Penny Wong, Opposition Leader Peter Dutton, and others were referred to the ICC by Sydney-based firm Birchgrove Legal as accessories to genocide, war crimes, and crimes against humanity, citing the defunding of UNRWA, the provision of military aid, and "unequivocal political support" for Israel's actions during the Gaza war.

== See also ==
- Gaza genocide
- Atrocity crime
- Demographics of Palestine
- Demographic history of Palestine (region)
- Genocides in history (21st century)#Israel/Palestine
- Human rights violations against Palestinians by Israel
- Israeli apartheid
- Allegations of genocide of Ukrainians in the Russo-Ukrainian war
- Allegations of genocide in the October 7 attacks
- Ten stages of genocide
- Timeline of the name Palestine
- Iranian reactions to the Gaza War (2008–2009)
