= Axis Rule in Occupied Europe =

1944 book by Raphael Lemkin

Axis Rule in Occupied Europe: Laws of Occupation, Analysis of Government, Proposals for Redress
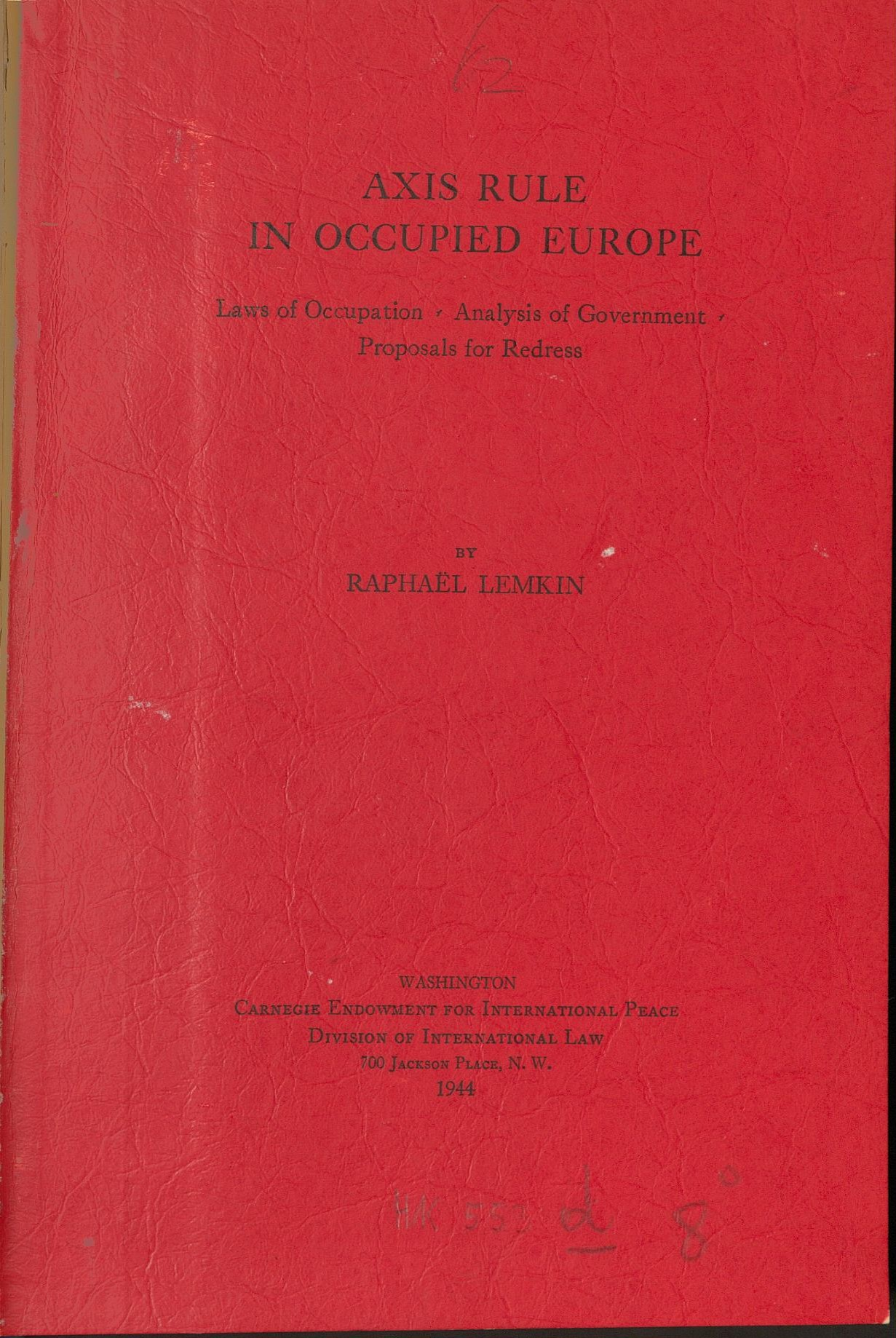
- Author: Raphael Lemkin
- Language: English
- Publisher: Carnegie Endowment for International Peace
- Publication date: 1944
- Publication place: U.S.
- Text: Axis Rule in Occupied Europe: Laws of Occupation, Analysis of Government, Proposals for Redress online

Axis Rule in Occupied Europe: Laws of Occupation, Analysis of Government, Proposals for Redress is a 1944 book by Polish-Jewish lawyer Raphael Lemkin that is best known for introducing the concept of genocide, which Lemkin coined from the Greek word γένος (genos, "race, people") with the Latin suffix -caedo ("act of killing").

Lemkin wrote the book in 1941 and 1942 and submitted it for publication in early 1942. Due to a contract dispute, its publication was delayed to 1944. This contributed to the Holocaust's centrality in the conception of genocide, as some parts of the book date to 1943 or 1944.

In the book, Lemkin argued that Hitler's main goal was not the conquest of Europe, but its demographic restructuring such that Germany could still dominate the continent in the event of military defeat. Lemkin at the time worked at the United States government's Board of Economic Warfare (later merged into the Foreign Economic Administration), which granted him insight into Germany's economic exploitation of occupied areas, which shaped his thinking. He also focused on law more than policy, hoping to avoid accusations of war propaganda by identifying violations of the current occupation law provided by the 1907 Hague Convention, and using these legal violations to generate proposals for redress in the last part of the book.

The first part of the book was written last and summarizes the techniques of German occupation, organized by subject. Part II details occupations by which country was affected—including occupations by Germany's allies Hungary, Italy, and Bulgaria. The longest part of the book, Part III, is devoted to translations of various laws and decrees issued in Axis-occupied Europe. Lemkin began his collection in early 1940, when he had escaped to Sweden and found work at the Stockholm University. He brought it with him when he accepted an offer to teach at Duke University in the United States in April 1941. The librarian at Duke University helped Lemkin expand his collection. Lemkin used the collection to teach classes at Duke as well as the War Department's School of Military Government; many of them were reprinted in Axis Rule. The most widely read sections of the book are Lemkin's preface and Chapter 9 of Part I, titled "Genocide", which summarizes the previous chapters in that part.

Lemkin's definition of genocide is much broader than that eventually adopted by the United Nations as the Genocide Convention in 1948. For Lemkin, genocide was a colonial phenomenon that consisted of the replacement of the national pattern of the victim with that of the perpetrator—for example, enforced changes in culture and language (known as cultural genocide), economic exploitation, forced labor, and population replacement via ethnic cleansing, which Lemkin called colonization.
