= Volkovyssky Uyezd =

Subdivision of the Grodno Governorate of the Russian Empire

Volkovyssky Uyezd (Russian: Волковы́сский уе́зд) was one of the subdivisions of the Grodno Governorate of the Russian Empire. It was situated in the northern part of the governorate. Its administrative centre was Vawkavysk (Volkovysk).

== Demographics ==
At the time of the Russian Empire Census of 1897, Volkovyssky Uyezd had a population of 148,721. Of these, 82.4% spoke Belarusian, 12.4% Yiddish, 2.3% Russian, 2.1% Polish, 0.3% German, 0.2% Ukrainian, 0.1% Bashkir and 0.1% Chuvash as their native language.
