= Kuala Lumpur War Crimes Commission =

Malaysian tribunal for trying war crimes

The Kuala Lumpur War Crimes Commission (KLWCC), also known as the Kuala Lumpur War Crimes Tribunal (KLWCT), is a Malaysian organisation established in 2007 by the country's former prime minister Mahathir Mohamad to purportedly unilaterally investigate war crimes. The KLWCC was instigated as an alternative to the International Criminal Court in The Hague, which Mahathir accused of bias in its selection of cases. The tribunal is not recognised by the United Nations, its verdicts being only symbolic.

== Governance ==
The governing body of the KLWCC was established to oversee and investigate complaints from victims of wars and armed conflict in relation to crimes against peace, war crimes, crimes against humanity and other like offences as recognized under international law. Members of the governance body include:

- Mahathir Mohamad (Chairman)
- Alfred Webre
- Richard Falk
- Zacharia Yatim – retired judge of the Malaysian Federal Court
- Tunku Sofiah Jewa – lawyer and scholar in international law
- Salleh Buang – former Federal Counsel in the Attorney-General Chambers, Malaysia
- Niloufer Bhagwat
- Shad Saleem Faruqi – Malaysian legal academic
- Michel Chossudovsky – retired academic (Global Research website)

== Convictions invoking universal jurisdiction ==
In November 2011, the tribunal purportedly exercised universal jurisdiction to try in absentia former US President George W. Bush and former British Prime Minister Tony Blair, convicting both for crimes against peace because of what the tribunal concluded was the unlawful invasion of Iraq.

In May 2012 after hearing a testimony from victims of torture at Abu Ghraib and Guantanamo, the Tribunal unanimously convicted in absentia the former US President George W. Bush, former US Vice President Dick Cheney, former US Defense Secretary Donald Rumsfeld, former US Assistant Attorneys General John Yoo and Jay Bybee, former US Attorney General Alberto Gonzales, and former US counselors David Addington and William Haynes II of conspiracy to commit war crimes, specifically torture. The Tribunal referred their findings to the chief prosecutor at the International Criminal Court in the Hague, and the United Nations Security Council.

In November 2013, the Tribunal found Israel guilty of genocide of the Palestinian people.

== Legitimacy ==
The KLWCC did not have the support of any government. The former United Nations Special Rapporteur on the Independence of Judges and Lawyers, Param Cumaraswamy, called the KLWCC a private enterprise with no legal basis, and questioned its legitimacy. It does not possess a mandate from the United Nations, nor does the UN grant it recognition. It has no power to order arrests or impose sentences, and it is unclear if its verdicts are anything other than symbolic.
