= Genos =

Ancient Greek word meaning "race, people"

In ancient Greece, a genos (Greek: γένος, "race, stock, kin", plural γένη genē) was a social group claiming common descent, referred to by a single name (see also Sanskrit "Gana"). Most gene were composed of noble families—Herodotus uses the term to denote noble families—and much of early Greek politics seems to have involved struggles between gene. Gene are best attested in Athens, where writers from Herodotus to Aristotle dealt with them.

Early modern historians postulated that gene had been the basic organizational group of the Dorian and Ionian tribes that settled Greece during the Greek Dark Ages, but more recent scholarship has reached the conclusion that gene arose later as certain families staked a claim to noble lineage. In time, some, but not necessarily all, gene came to be associated with hereditary priestly functions.

== See also ==
- Gana
- Gens
- Phratry
- Phyle
