= Casualties of the Gaza war =

Part of the Israeli–Palestinian conflict

Event	Total	Civilians		Children	
Event	Total	Total	%	Total	%
October 7 attacks	1,195	828	69.2% (Note: Calculated from referenced table data (828/1,195).)	36	3.01% (Note: Calculated from referenced table data (36/1,195).)
Israeli invasion and bombing of Gaza	74,370	~59,496 (Note: Calculated from referenced table data (80% of 74,370).)	~80%	21,976	29.55% (Note: Calculated from referenced table data (21,976/74,370).)
Israeli attacks in the West Bank	1,216			254	20.89% (Note: Calculated from referenced table data (254/1,216).)

As of 9 October 2026, at least 77,632 people (75,586+ Palestinians (Note: Calculated from referenced table data (74,370+1,216).) and 2,046+ Israelis) have been reported killed in the Gaza war (in all of Israel-Palestine) according to the Gaza Health Ministry (GHM) and Israeli Ministry of Foreign Affairs, including 270 journalists and media workers, 120 academics, and over 560 humanitarian aid workers, a number that includes 393 employees of UNRWA. A study by OHCHR found that 70% of the Palestinians killed in residential buildings or similar housing were women and children.

A February 2025 analysis of deaths in Gaza between October 2023 and 30 June 2024 concluded that trauma-related deaths were undercounted by the GHM by 41% during this period. It estimated that there had been 64,260 deaths from traumatic injury by June 2024, likely exceeding 70,000 by October 2024, with 59.1% of them being women, children and the elderly. The findings do not include non-trauma-related deaths. A comparable estimate up to May 2025 would be 93,000 (77,000 to 109,000), representing 4–5% of Gaza's pre-war population. Another casualty analysis published in February 2026 estimated 75,200 violent deaths up to 5 January 2025 – 34.7% higher than the GHM's casualty count at the time, and 56.2% women, children, and elderly individuals. The analysis estimated 8,540 excess non-violent deaths. An October 2025 analysis estimated 78,318 violent deaths (70,614 to 87,504) up to 31 December 2024, with a comparable estimate of between 100,000 and 126,000 violent deaths by November 2025.

A May 2025 investigation found that a classified IDF database listed 8,900 Palestinian fighters as dead or likely dead, or 17% of the 53,000 death toll at the time, which if correct would indicate that 83% of the dead were civilians—among conflicts since 1989, only the Srebrenica massacre (though not the Bosnian war overall), the siege of Mariupol, and the Rwandan genocide have seen a higher rate of civilian casualties. In response, the IDF said that the numbers in the article are incorrect.

A survey by the Palestinian Center for Policy and Survey Research (PCPSR) reported showed over 60% of Gazans have lost family members since the war began. Thousands of more dead bodies are thought to be under the rubble of destroyed buildings. The number of injured is greater than 100,000; United Nations agencies have reported that Gaza is now home to the highest number of child amputees per capita in the world.

The majority of casualties have been in the Gaza Strip. The GHM total casualty count does not distinguish Palestinian deaths by Israeli attacks from those by other means, like friendly fire, and describes all casualties as victims of "Israeli aggression". On 3 March 2026, the GHM published the names, gender and birth date of 72,004 individual Palestinians whose identities were confirmed and continues to attempt to identify all casualties.

The October 7 attacks on Israel killed 1,195 people, including 815 civilians. Casualties have also occurred in other parts of Israel, as well as in southern Lebanon, Syria, Yemen, and Iran. As reported by the Defense Ministry, the total number of Israeli fatalities as of October 2025 is 1,152. This figure encompasses soldiers, police personnel, Shin Bet operatives, and civilian security officials who died on duty, as well as those who succumbed to accidents, illness, or suicide. Notably, around 42% of the deceased were individuals under the age of 21. According to the Israeli Ministry of Defense's Rehabilitation Division, about 1,000 soldiers are wounded every month. In August 2024, the ministry predicted that it would have to account for 100,000 disabled IDF veterans by 2030 due to the war. An August 2025 report indicated that the rise in suicides among IDF soldiers was due to psychological trauma resulting from the prolonged conflict.

== Gaza Strip ==
=== Civilians ===
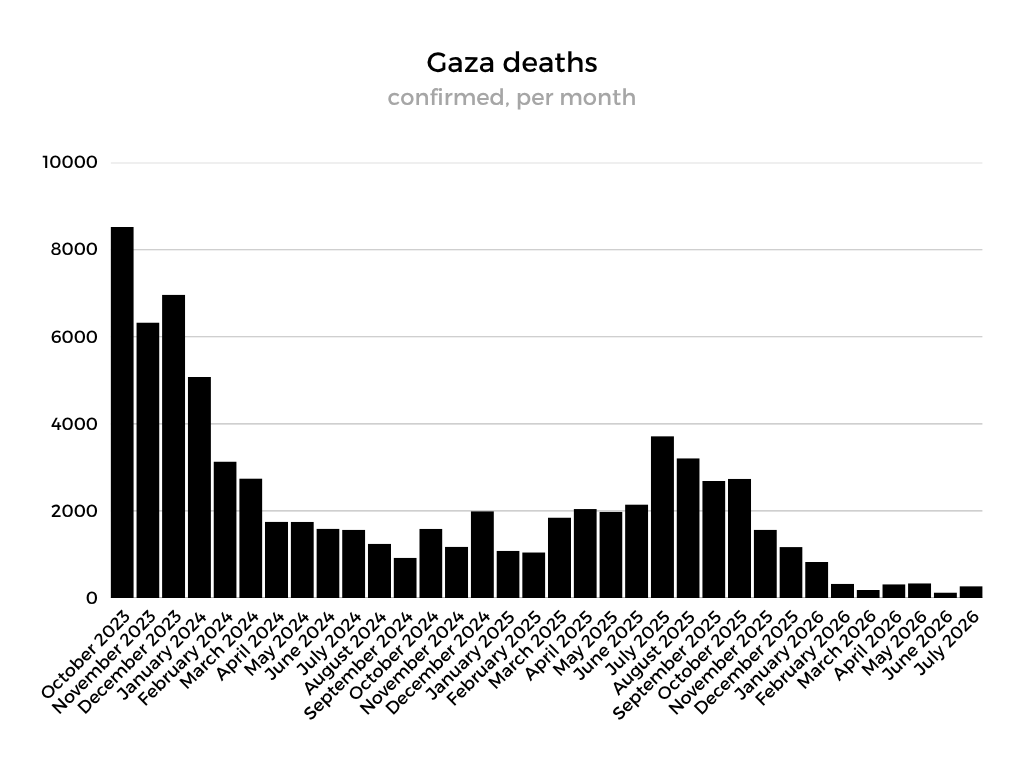
Gaza war deaths by month

The demographic composition of Gazans killed between 7 October 2023 and August 2024.
Source: GHM casualty list (analysis by Michael Spagat).
1. Children (0-17) (33.1%)
2. Women (18-59) (18.3%)
3. Elderly (60+) (8.60%)
4. Men (18-59) (40.0%)
The demographic composition of Gazans killed in residential buildings between Nov 2023 and April 2024.
Source: all deaths that have been cross-verified from three independent casualty lists (analysis by OHCHR).
1. Children (44.0%)
2. Women (26.0%)
3. Men (30.0%)

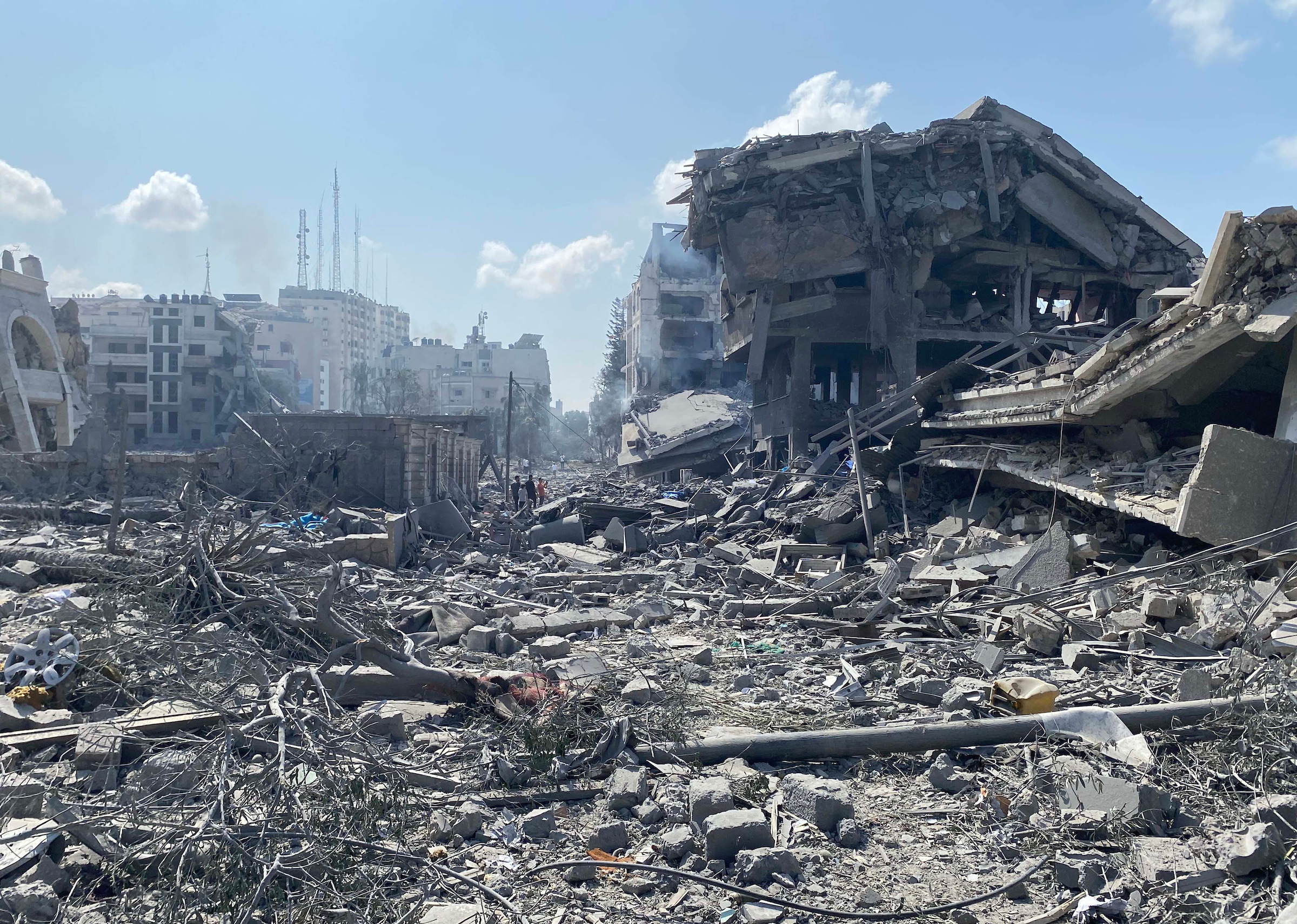
Remal in Gaza City following an Israeli airstrike, 10 October 2023

The Gaza Strip suffered significant civilian casualties from Israeli bombardments in the beginning of the war.

On 3 November 2023, at least 10 cemetery workers were killed by an Israeli airstrike while working at a graveyard in Beit Lahia. On 4 November, an unnamed Israeli official said that around 20,000 people had been killed in Gaza, "most of them terrorists." On 14 November, two volleyball players, Hassan Zuaiter and Ibrahim Qusaya, were killed in an Israeli airstrike on Jabalia refugee camp. As of 1 December 102 UNRWA employees in Gaza had been killed in Israeli airstrikes. On 29 December, UNRWA reported 308 people had been killed in UNRWA shelters. Euro-Mediterranean Human Rights Monitor reported that the IDF was taking and holding Palestinian bodies from Gaza, prompting calls for an international investigation on organ theft suspicions. The organization further stated that Israel had systematically killed hundreds of tech specialists, including "programmers, information technology experts, and computer engineering analysts". In March 2024, Al Jazeera English's news blog reported that Israeli forces conducted a pattern of killing entire families by targeting the homes they were sheltering in. An entire family, including both parents and four sons, were shot dead by the IDF in December 2023.

According to the Gaza Health Ministry, at least 50 people were killed by Israeli strikes on Jabalia on 31 October and 1 November. Significant civilian casualties were reported following the Al-Ahli Arab Hospital explosion, the Jabalia camp airstrike on 31 October, and the Fakhoora school airstrike on 4 November. Other mass casualty events included the Church of Saint Porphyrius airstrike and the al-Shati refugee camp airstrike, as well as numerous attacks on refugee camps, schools, and healthcare facilities. The United Nations stated they had recorded seven mass casualty incidents just between 24 and 29 October 2024 in the Gaza Strip.

By late-June 2024, a Palestinian NGO reported that as many as 10,000 Palestinians had been disabled by injuries related to the war. According to public health experts, such as chair of global public health at the University of Edinburgh Devi Sridhar, the death tolls in the Gaza Strip are likely an undercount.

In September 2025, The Guardian citing data from independent conflict tracker ACLED, that is backed by western governments and the UN, reported a vast majority of Palestinians killed were civilians since Israel's renewed offensive earlier in March. Over a six-month period, ACLED had tracked reports on losses inflicted on Hamas and allied armed groups from "reliable local and international media", Israeli military statements and statements from Hamas and found that Israel's claim of combatants killed had exceeded what could be independently verified. ACLED report wrote, "Since 18 March, Israel claims it killed more than 2,100 operatives, though Acled data indicates that the number is closer to 1,100, and includes Hamas’ political figures, as well as fighters from other groups". Earlier in August 2025, The Guardian cited a classified Israeli military internal report, noting that, if the data was accurate, approximately 83% of Palestinians killed would have been civilians. This ratio of civilian to combatants among dead, is considered unusually high for modern warfare even when compared with conflicts like Sudanese and Syrian Civil War, renown for their indiscriminate killings. The Israeli military had rejected the analysis, arguing that militant deaths may have been undercounted, but did not release alternative casualty figures or a detailed methodology to support its position.

Investigative reports by +972 Magazine and Local Call, as well as reporting by Haaretz, indicates that the Israel Defense Forces (IDF) have, at times, misreported or classified a high number of civilian deaths as "militants". For example, +972 and Local Call reported that an Israeli battalion stationed in Rafah recorded around 100 Palestinians as militants; however an officer in that battalion later stated that only two of the 100 Palestinians were armed. In a separate case, Haaretz reported that an IDF spokesman stated that all 200 Palestinians who had been killed by the 252nd Division in the Netzarim Corridor were "terrorists", but only 10 of the 200 individuals were subsequently verified as Hamas operatives. In April 2024, members of Israeli Knesset's Foreign Affairs and Defense Committee had expressed doubt on the figures given to them by the army and later found the army had inflated the militant casualties "in order to create a 2:1 ratio" of civilian to militant deaths. An Israeli intelligence source told The Guardian, +972, and Local Call that they had used figures based primarily on officer testimonies, which likely overcounted Hamas deaths. In contrast, the figures in Israel's internal intelligence database are the only numbers that the army could rely on with "a high degree of certainty" as it uses person-by-person analysis; however, this method may also undercount the number of Hamas deaths.

Israeli forces killed at least eight Palestinians in Gaza, including a father and his 13-year-old son. Since the establishment of a ceasefire brokered by the United States, more than 1,600 Palestinians in Gaza have lost their lives; meanwhile, the total number of casualties from October 7, 2023, to November 2026 has reached over 74,000.

==== Demographics ====
In November 2025, a study by the Max Planck Institute for Demographic Research estimated that the total number of violent deaths in Gaza was between 100,000 and 126,000, of which 27% were children under 15 years old, and 24% women (together making up 51% of the total).

In early September 2025, total casualties exceeded 64,231, with children accounting for at least 30%, and women about 16% (together, 46%). There were 2,596 children who had lost both parents. Furthermore, 53,724 children had lost one parent; 47,804 their father and 5,920 their mother. These September numbers were all cited from the Gaza Health Ministry.

In April 2024, about half a year since the war started, it was initially reported that children comprised 44% and women 26% (making up 70% together). In May 2024, the United Nations adjusted its estimate of the proportion of women and children among those killed in Gaza to 52% – reporting that 32% were children, 20% women – 40% men, and 8% elderly.

Two and a half months into the war, OCHA estimated a total of 20,000 casualties. More than 40% were children, over 31% were women (71% together). In March 2024, five months into the war, the casualties consisted of an estimated 43% children and 29% women (72% together). Another source later that same month reported that children made up 31.2% of the fatalities, and among adults, including the elderly, 25.3% were women and 43.5% were men.

=== Children ===
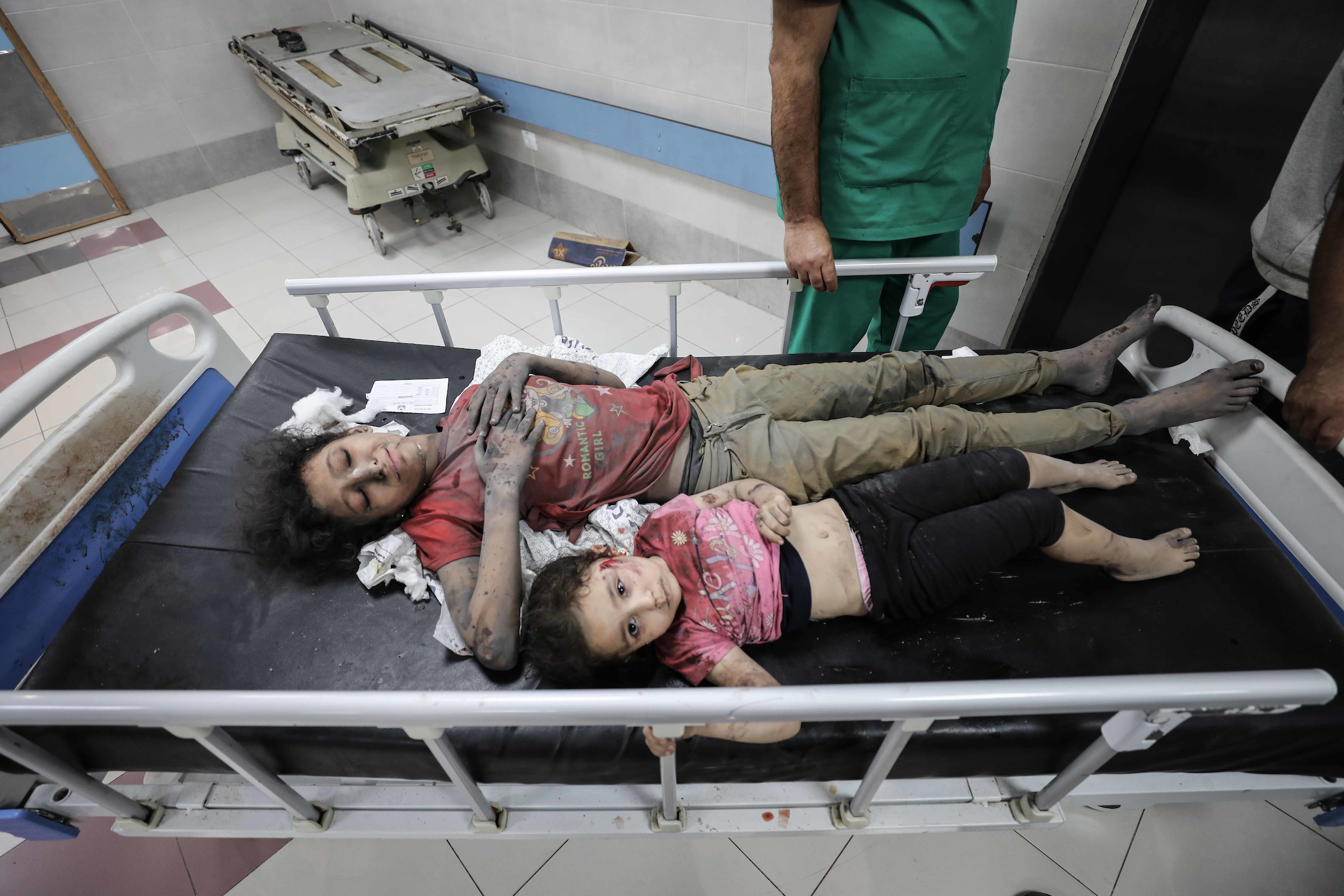
Wounded children wait for treatment at the overcrowded emergency ward of Al-Shifa hospital in Gaza City

By 25 October 2023, when over 1000 children had been killed, Qatar's Foreign Minister Mohammed bin Abdulrahman bin Jassim Al Thani criticized the international community for "acting as if the lives of Palestinian children do not count". In a statement, UNICEF regional director Adele Khodr stated Gaza's child death toll was a "growing stain on our collective conscience". On 28 October 2023, the number of families who had been killed entirely had risen to 825. On 30 October 2023, Save the Children reported more children had died in three weeks in Gaza than in the entire sum of conflicts around the world in the past four years. UNRWA Commissioner-General Philippe Lazzarini briefed the UN Security Council, sharing Save the Children's analysis. By the end of October 2023 over 3000 children had been killed. The death of Hind Rajab drew significant media coverage following the release of her emergency call and her subsequent disappearance for 12 days.

On 29 February 2024, Gaza's Ministry of Health reported that 44% (i.e. over 13,000) of the fatalities were children. This disproportionate amount is mainly a result of the strip's very young population, of which 40% are below 14 years of age.

On 8 May 2024, the UN officially revised previous numbers regarding the breakdown of casualties following more formal investigations, the total number killed remaining the same. Only considering identifiable casualties, the proportion of children killed in Gaza was reported as 31.6% or 7797 identified children casualties out of 24,686 identified bodies. A joint report by Oxfam and Action on Armed Violence in October 2024 found the Israeli military had killed more women and children in Gaza than in any other conflict around the world in the past two decades.

=== Civilian to combatant ratio ===
Civilian to combatant ratio
Source	Date	Percent civilian	Death count			Explanation
Source	Date	Percent civilian	Total	Combatant	Civilian	Explanation
The Guardian, +972 Magazine and Local Call	May 2025	83%	~53,000	~8,900	~44,100	Classified Israeli military intelligence database listed 8,900 combatants by name as of May 2025. GHM total casualties of 53,000 imply only 17% of those killed were known named combatants. The list did not include combatants who do not belong to Hamas or PIJ, and according to the report was likely undercounting the total amount of militants. However, the report also noted that since Gaza's Health Ministry death toll could be "significantly" undercounted according to recent studies, the civilian-to-combatant ratio could be higher.
Action on Armed Violence	28 October 2024	74.0%	40,717	10,595	30,122	"Bare minimum" estimate, assuming male and female civilian deaths are exactly equal
Action on Armed Violence	28 October 2024	80.6%	40,717	7,888	32,829	Taking male-female civilian casualty ratio from Airwars' database on Israeli airstrikes in Gaza
Action on Armed Violence	28 October 2024	84.4%	40,717	6,366	34,351	Taking the male-female civilian casualty ratio and adjusting for non-airstrike casualties
Michael Spagat	2 August 2024	~80%	39,145 (Note: Spagat cites "the fifth in a series of detailed lists of people" released by Gaza MoH, which was released on 24 July, for his calculations.)	~7,829	~31,316	"We must guess at the fraction of combatants among the 41.2% [males 15-69]. But the age range of 15 to 69 is wide so I think that a generous estimate for the IDF would be that half of the 41.2% were civilians."
Adam Gaffney, a critical care physician and an assistant professor at Harvard Medical School, in The Nation	3 May 2024	~80%	36,906	~7,000	~29,906	"assume that the number of noncombatant men who have been killed equals the number of women killed"
Benjamin Netanyahu	12 May 2024	~53%	~30,000	~14,000	~16,000	No evidence provided. Widely criticized as inaccurate. See below.
Armed Conflict Location and Event Data	9 October 2024			~8,500		"However, more detailed IDF reports on the killing of militants containing specifics on timeframes, locations, or operations, recorded by ACLED, account for approximately 8,500 fatalities."
Euro-Mediterranean Human Rights Monitor	5 December 2023	~90%	21,022	1,362	19,660	~60% of dead were women and children; among adult male deaths (including elderly men), ~65% are civilians based on field documentation
Houssein Ayoub (Mathematics Program, Department of Mathematics and Statistics, Qatar University), in Frontiers in Public Health	26 October 2023	87.3%	7,028	893	6,135	Derived a statistical model of combatant deaths from previous Gaza–Israel conflicts and fitted it to the reported deaths from 7 to 26 October 2023. The model yields 87.3% deaths were civilian with a 95% UI: 84.6%–90.3%.

The Gaza Ministry of Health casualty numbers do not provide the proportion of casualties who are civilian; as a result, varying estimates have been given by analysts. A study by the London School of Hygiene and Tropical Medicine in The Lancet covering the period 7–26 October estimated 68.1% of casualties were children, women or elders and therefore likely non-combatants, while an analysis published in December in Haaretz by Israeli sociologist Yagil Levy estimated at least 61% of the casualties were in this category. Both studies were based on figures from Gaza's Ministry of Health. Considering only women, children and elderly as civilians (i.e. classifying all adult men as combatants) gives a conservative figure for civilians, although the true proportion of civilians is likely higher. In early December, Euro-Mediterranean Human Rights Monitor estimated that 90% of the casualties were civilians. In December, Israel's military said it estimated two out of three (66%) of those killed to be civilians. On 30 May, professor Adam Gaffney of Harvard Medical School estimated civilians constituted 80% of total killed. On 2 August, professor Michael Spagat also estimated that roughly 80% of GHM recorded deaths constituted civilians.

Even the conservative figure of 61% is higher than the average civilian death rate in all world conflicts "from the Second World War to the 1990s", according to Yigal Levy. The number of casualties is higher than in any conflict in Gaza's recent history, with Neta Crawford of the Costs of War Project at Brown University stating, "This is, in the 21st century, a significant and out-of-the-norm level of destruction". On 31 December, Al Jazeera English stated 2023 was the deadliest year for Palestinians since the 1948 Nakba.

In late April 2024 Khalil al-Hayya, a top Hamas official, said that no more than 20% of Hamas's fighters had been killed.

US intelligence estimated in June 2024 that between 11,000 and 13,000 militants have been killed.

==== Israeli military reports ====
In early December 2023, an Israeli official reported Israel had killed 5,000 militants, but provided no evidence to support the report. On 29 December, the IDF said it had killed 8,000 Hamas fighters. On 30 December 2023, Euro-Mediterranean Human Rights Monitor estimated 2,353 militant deaths (based 30,034 total and 27,681 civilian deaths). On 19 February 2024, one Hamas official told Reuters 6,000 of its militants had been killed, but a second Hamas official denied this figure in an interview with BBC. Hamas also put out an official statement denying the 6,000 figure. The same day, the IDF said it had killed 12,000 militants up to that point. The IDF did not confirm that number to the BBC, but in two separate responses, said the figure is "approximately 10,000" and "more than 10,000", with the Israeli embassy in London giving a similar figure. On 7 April, the IDF said that more than 13,000 operative of Hamas and its allies had been killed by Israel in Gaza in the fighting (although an IDF press release gave 12,000+), in addition to the 1,000 killed on 7 October. The IDF said these deaths included five Hamas brigade commanders or equivalent, 20 battalion commanders, and over 100 company commanders or equivalent. On 12 May Netanyahu said about 14,000 militants and 16,000 civilians had been killed in Gaza – that about 47% of the deaths were of militants. On 15 August 2024 the IDF said more than 17,000 militants had been killed.

The AP, CNN, Washington Post, NBC and others have all said that the IDF has provided no evidence for its reports of how many militants it has killed, or been unable to verify what the IDF has said.

Sources have doubted the Israeli figures by questioning the IDF's ability to distinguish civilians from combatants (for example, the IDF mistakenly identified three Israeli civilians as Palestinian militants). Many observers believe Israel simply treats all adult male casualties as militants. Other observers argue that Israel could be arriving at inflated figures of militant deaths by including all civil servants as militants.

BBC Verify repeatedly asked IDF for its methodology on counting militant deaths, but the IDF never responded. BBC Verify attempted to count militant deaths by compiling all announcements of militant deaths on the IDF's official telegram channel; it found the IDF had made 160 such announcements, summing up to 714 total militant deaths in the Gaza Strip (as of 29 February), however 247 references used terms such as “several”, “dozens”, or “hundreds” which made a meaningful tally impossible. BBC Verify also viewed all 280 videos posted on the IDF's YouTube channel of Gaza operations, and found that only one of those videos actually showed dead bodies of Palestinian militants.

An analysis by Zoran Kusovac in Al-Jazeera in December 2023, said that IDF's own numbers imply 62 Hamas fighters killed for every Israeli soldier killed in Gaza operations. Kusovac argued that if only half the militants were killed in combat, a constant loss exchange ratio of 31:1 over many months would be so demoralizing that Hamas fighters would rout, yet as Hamas continues to fight, its losses must be smaller than reported.

In March 2024, Haaretz interviewed several standing army commanders and reserve commanders who cast doubt on Israel's official figures of how many "terrorists" it had killed. Many of those included in the combatant killed count were simply "Palestinians who never held a gun in their lives".

In January 2025, The Jerusalem Post said the "numbers don't add up" regarding initial Israeli estimates of Hamas' forces, unless Hamas has fully replaced its initial fighting force. In October 2023, the IDF had estimated Hamas 25,000 fighters; in 2024 the IDF said it had killed 17–20,000 fighters, wounding another 14–16,000 and capturing 6,000. Yet in January, it said there were still 12–23,000 fighters left. To reconcile the discrepancy, the IDF revised its October 2023 estimate to 40,000 and said Hamas must have recruited thousands more.

=== Impacts ===
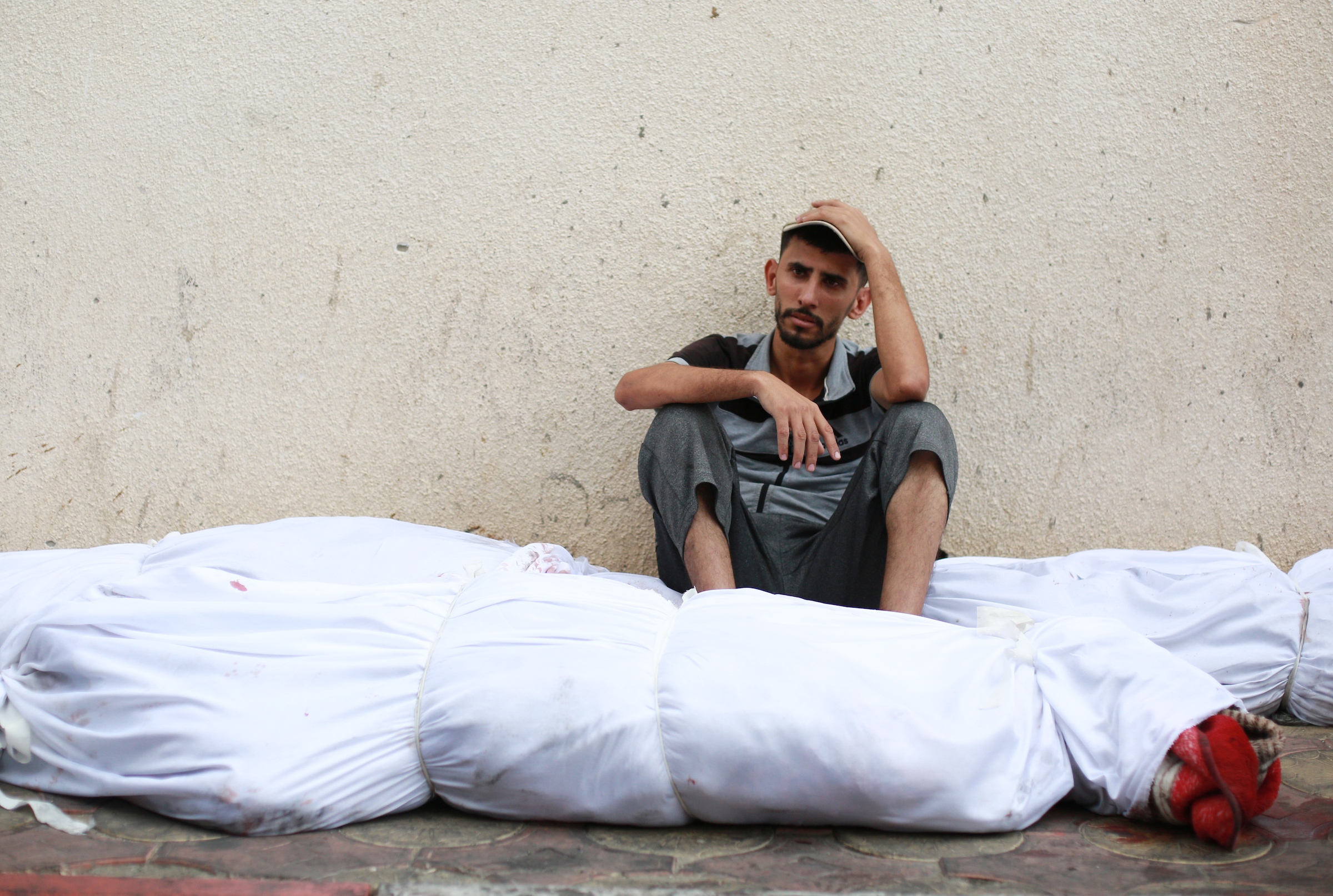
Palestinian man with body bags in Jabalia refugee camp

On 13 October, the Palestinian Ministry of Health noted 20 surnames had been removed from Gaza's civil registry, meaning every single person in that entire family had been killed. The New York Times stated, "Family trees have been dismembered, and whole branches obliterated." An Associated Press investigation found 60 Palestinian families where at least 25 people were killed between October and December 2023, sometimes across four generations.

On 16 October 2023, UNRWA stated there were so many deaths in Gaza that there were no longer enough body bags. Because the morgues were so overcrowded, bodies were kept in ice cream trucks. On 11 November 2023, Monir al-Bashr, the director of the Health Ministry of Gaza, stated graves were being dug by hand. On 12 November 2023, Mai al-Kaila noted staff at Al-Shifa were unable to bury 100 decomposing bodies. On 14 November 2023, the Palestinian Red Crescent noted it was unable to rescue the wounded and injured beneath the rubble, noting, "Those injured are left there in agony to suffer and die with no response to their calls of help." By August 2024, the dead were being buried in the streets and house yards, as well as in mass graves.

At the end of January 2024 BBC reported that based on a recent report from the Euro-Mediterranean Human Rights Monitor more than 24,000 children have lost one or both parents due to the war. The United Nations agency UNICEF have estimated that there are about 19,000 orphaned or unaccompanied children in Gaza, with some being dug out of rubble or found throughout the strip.

==== Famine ====
Gaza Strip famine تجويع قطاع غزة
- Country: Palestine
- Location: Gaza Strip
- Period: 2023–present
- Total deaths: 440+ as of 21 September 2025 (Note: The total number of deaths from malnutrition and starvation reported by the Gaza Health Ministry was 440 as of 10 September, including 147 children.)
- Causes: blockade, siege, airstrikes, and limitation of aid
- Relief: Humanitarian aid
- Consequences: 677,000+ in starvation

The Gaza war has led to imminent famine conditions in the Gaza Strip, resulting from Israeli airstrikes and the ongoing blockade of the Gaza Strip by Israel, which includes restrictions on humanitarian aid. By February 2024, 2.2 million people in Gaza were experiencing food insecurity at emergency level.

Airstrikes have destroyed food infrastructure, such as bakeries, mills, and food stores, and there is a widespread scarcity of essential supplies due to the blockade of aid. (Note: The Israeli NGO Btselem has stated the famine is a direct outcome of Israeli policy: "This reality is not a byproduct of war, but a direct result of Israel's declared policy. Residents now depend entirely on food supplies from outside Gaza, as they can no longer produce almost any food themselves. Most cultivated fields have been destroyed, and accessing open areas during the war is dangerous in any case. Bakeries, factories and food warehouses have been bombed or shut down due to lack of basic supplies, fuel and electricity.") By March 2024, this had caused starvation for more than half a million Gazans and is part of a broader humanitarian crisis in the Strip. It is the "highest number of people facing catastrophic hunger" ever recorded on the IPC scale, and is widely expected to be the most intense man-made famine since the Second World War.

In March 2024, the Integrated Food Security Phase Classification (IPC) aid partnership said that the residents of Gaza are perishing due to starvation. The alarming pace at which this crisis of hunger and malnutrition, caused by humans, is spreading in Gaza is deeply concerning. Half of Gaza's entire population is currently facing catastrophic conditions and is on the brink of famine, a situation that has never been seen before. Approximately 1.1 million individuals in Gaza – half its population – were grappling with severe hunger. By October 2024, the IPC and World Food Programme reported that more than 1.8 million Palestinians in Gaza were experiencing "extremely critical" levels of hunger, resulting from 70% of crop fields destroyed and livelihoods decimated during Israel's offensive.

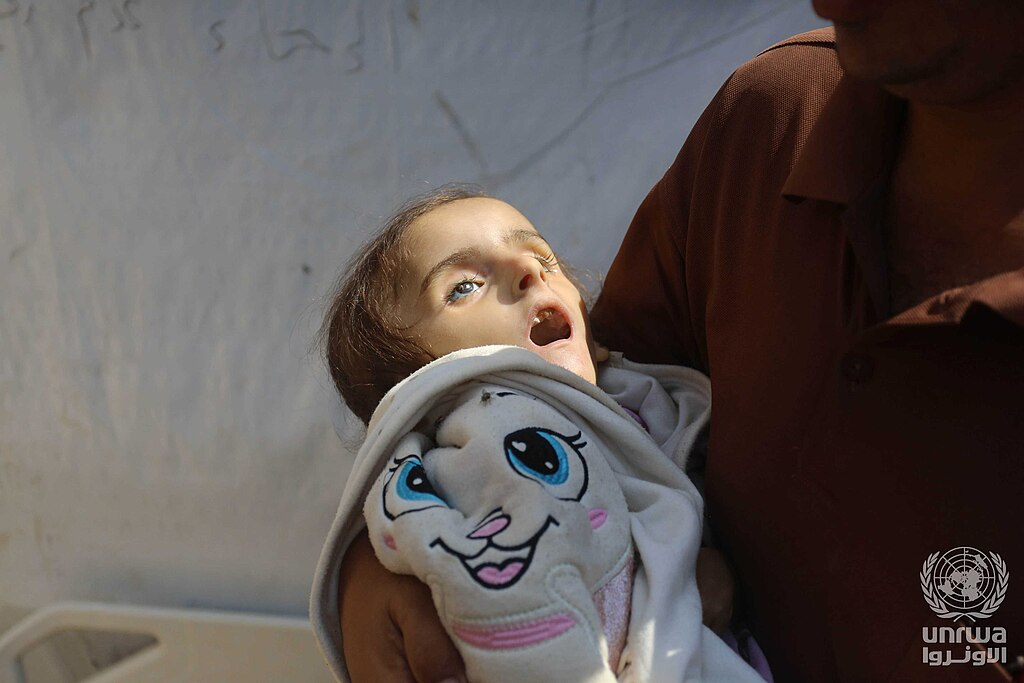
Four-year-old Palestinian girl who died from malnutrition and lack of treatment, August 2024

A letter sent to President Joe Biden, Vice President Kamala Harris, and others on 2 October 2024 by 99 American healthcare workers who have served in the Gaza Strip since 7 October 2023, using the Integrated Food Security Phase Classification standards and the available data on the severity of food shortage in different parts of Gaza, calculated that there had been at the very least 62,413 deaths in Gaza from starvation (most of them young children) and at least 5,000 deaths from lack of access to care for chronic diseases. This estimate was included in the estimate for indirect deaths in the war in a study from the Watson Institute for International and Public Affairs at Brown University. According to UNRWA, in the four months to mid December 2024, some 19,000 children were treated for acute malnutrition.

As of August 2025, Integrated Food Security Phase Classification (IPC) projections show 100% of the population are experiencing "high levels of acute food insecurity", and 32% are projected to face Phase 5 catastrophic levels by 30 September 2025. On 22 August 2025, the IPC said that famine is taking place in one of the five governorates in the Gaza Strip: specifically, the Gaza Governorate which includes Gaza City. The IPC added that, within the next month, famine was likely to also occur in both the Deir al-Balah Governorate and Khan Yunis Governorate. The IPC had insufficient data on the North Gaza Governorate for a classification but concluded that conditions were likely similar or worse than in the Gaza Governorate. Within the next 6 weeks as of 16 August, the number of people in IPC Phase 5 is expected to rise from 500,000 to over 640,000.

=== Death toll ===
UN OCHA casualties summary, as of 19 June 2024

On 25 October 2023, US President Joe Biden stated he had "no confidence" in the death totals reported by the Gaza Health Ministry. In response, Human Rights Watch stated that after three decades working in Gaza and conducting its own investigation, it considers Gaza Health Ministry's totals to be reliable. Matthew Miller made a similar claim to Biden's, despite the fact that the US Department of State cites the Gaza Health Ministry's death tolls in its own internal reports. On 26 October, the Gaza Health Ministry responded by releasing a 212-page document of 6,747 individual names and ID numbers, as well as 281 unidentified fatalities. The US State Department Assistant Secretary of State for Near Eastern Affairs told a Congressional hearing on 9 November that the death toll was "very high, frankly, and it could be that they're even higher than are being cited." The Biden administration ultimately changed to faith in the health ministry statistics. The GHM's casualty count was also initially disputed by the Trump administration but was later cited by President Trump.

Every death registered in Gaza is the result of a verified change in the population registry approved by the Government of Israel. The Israeli government notes that its "Population Registry Office works to update population registry files located on the Israeli side to match the files that are held" in the West Bank and Gaza. On 26 October, the United Nations humanitarian office added they use the Gaza Ministry of Health's death totals because they are "clearly sourced" and their estimates have been described as trustworthy by the World Health Organization's (WHO) regional emergency director Richard Brennan. On 6 December, a peer-reviewed article by Johns Hopkins Bloomberg School of Public Health scholars in The Lancet concluded the Gaza Ministry of Health's death tolls were accurate. In May 2024, The Economist argued that the Ministry of Health's death tolls were "legitimate" and marked the lower bound of lives lost.

Around mid-November, the Gaza Health Ministry had begun to lose count of deaths stating that it struggled to update casualty tolls as a result of blackouts, high death tolls, and the destruction of the healthcare system. On 6 January 2024, the Gaza Health Ministry requested that civilians register their dead online, as the healthcare system collapse had resulted in the ministry being unable to maintain a regularly updated death toll. In February 2024, a joint study by the London School of Hygiene and Tropical Medicine and the Johns Hopkins Center for Humanitarian Health at Johns Hopkins University found the war continuing at status quo would result in between 58,260 and 74,290 excess deaths by 6 August.

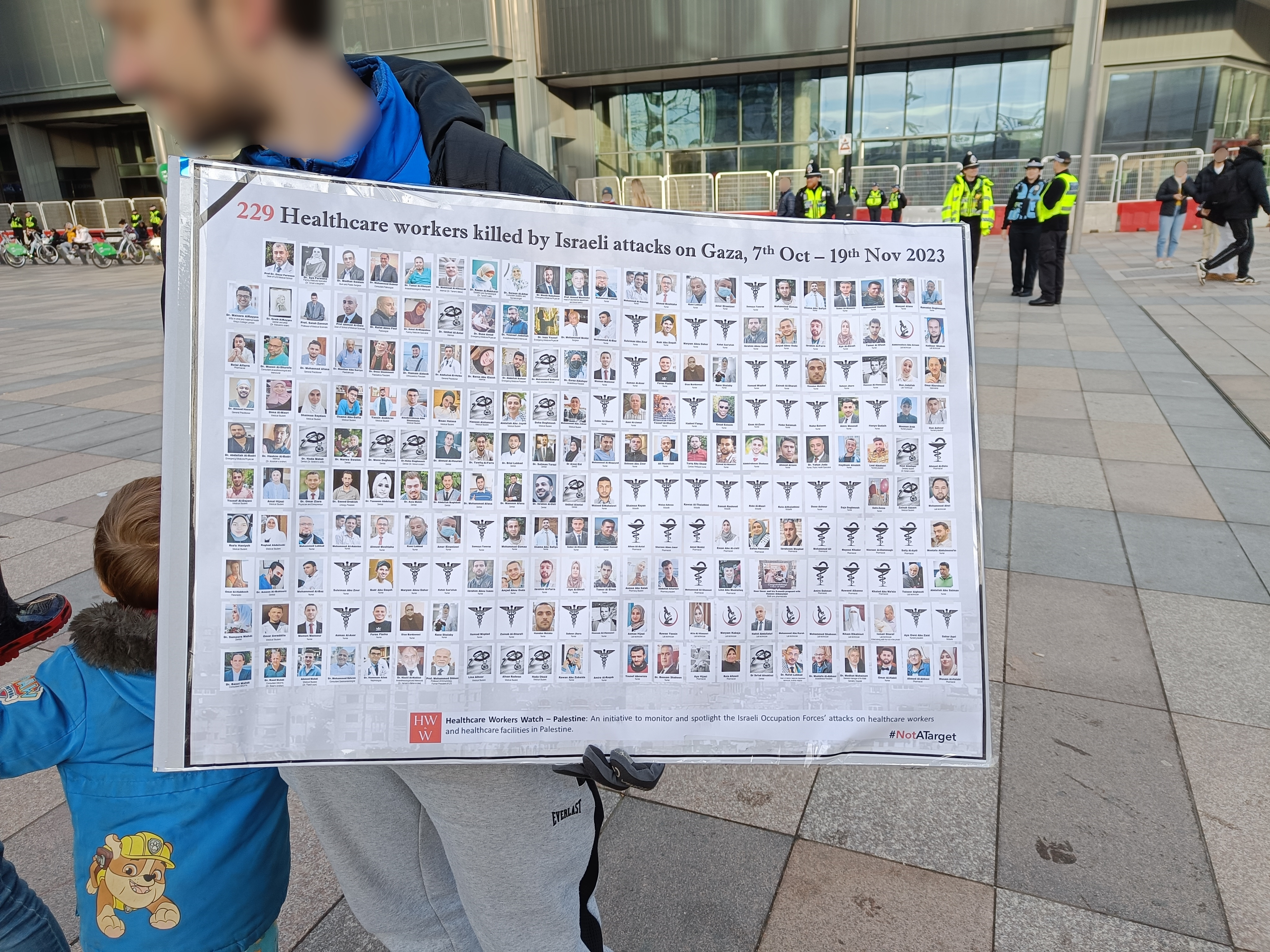
Photos of Palestinian healthcare workers killed in the Gaza war, 25 November 2023

As of 29 February, the Gaza Health Ministry stated that its daily tallies now rely upon "a combination of accurate death counts from hospitals that are still partially operating, and on estimates from media reports to assess deaths in the north of Gaza", but did not "cite or say which sources those are." On 31 March, it stated that 15,070 fatalities (45.8% of the then total) had been compiled via "reliable media sources" instead of direct reporting. The Ministry further clarified in reports made on 1 and 4 April that it had "incomplete data" for 12,263 (later reduced 11,371) of its 33,091 reported fatalities.

On 25 June, Euro-Mediterranean Human Rights Monitor estimated 51,000 extra natural (non-casualty) deaths have resulted from the blockade and from the collapse of the health system.

On 16 September 2024, the Gaza health ministry released another 649-page document, listing the names of 34,344 Palestinians who had been killed and identified by 31 August. The first 187 pages of the document entirely contained children who were under 16 years old.

On 23 March 2025, after two months of collecting bodies during the ceasefire, the Gaza health ministry published a third document 1,516 pages long, listing the names of 50,021 Palestinians who had been killed. The first 350 pages of the document entirely contained children who were under 16 years old.

In January 2026, Israeli sources reported that, for the first time, an Israeli military official accepted figures released by Gaza's health ministry, showing that more than 71,000 Palestinians were killed since October 2023 by direct Israeli fire, not by other causes such starvation and those buried under the rubble. The official stated that the IDF is currently analysing the data to calculate the number of people who were killed are combatants and civilians.

=== Journalists in Gaza ===
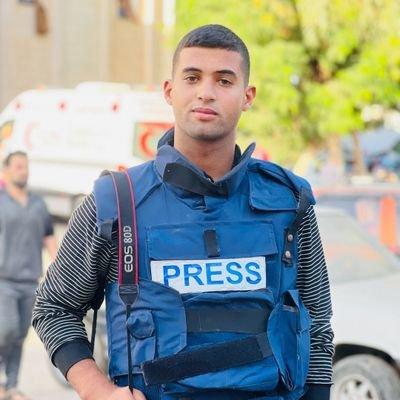
Al Jazeera's correspondent Hossam Shabat was killed in March 2025. The IDF confirmed that it had deliberately targeted Shabat.

Numerous Palestinian journalists in Gaza were killed by Israeli attacks while in the line of duty. Ibrahim Mohammad Lafi, a photographer for Ain Media, was fatally shot during the attack on the Erez crossing on 7 October, while Mohammad Jarghoun, a reporter with Smart Media, was killed east of Rafah on the same day. Freelance journalist Mohammad el-Salhi was also shot dead on the border east of Bureij refugee camp on 7 October. On 9 October, Saeed al-Taweel, editor-in-chief of Al-Khamsa News website, Mohammed Subh and Hisham Alnwajha were killed by an airstrike while filming an anticipated attack in Gaza City.

On 10 October, two additional journalists were reported missing, and another was injured by shrapnel. The homes of two journalists were destroyed by shelling, and the offices of four media outlets were destroyed by airstrikes. On 22 October, Rushdi Sarraj was killed by an Israeli airstrike on his home. On 24 October, reporter Wael Al-Dahdouh lost his entire family due to an Israeli airstrike. On 27 October, the IDF told Reuters and Agence France Presse it would not guarantee their journalists' safety in Gaza. On 30 October, Al Jazeera correspondent Youmna El-Sayed received a threat from Israeli forces, leading the spokesperson for the UN-Secretary General to remark on the "immense courage" of journalists in Gaza. On 2 November, Mohammed Abu Hatab and 10 members of his family were killed by an Israeli airstrike.

On 19 October, the committee to Protect Journalists stated 21 journalists were confirmed dead, eight were injured, and three were missing or detained. A 29 October report by Reporters Without Borders (RSF) said that Israel had targeted journalists who were clearly identifiable as press, in two 13 October missile strikes that killed a reporter and injured four. On 31 October, RSF said that 34 journalists had been killed to date in the conflict, including 12 "in connection with their work", ten of whom were killed in Israel's attack on Gaza; they described the first two weeks of the conflict as the deadliest start of a war of the 21st century for journalists. On 7 November, an Israeli airstrike killed journalist Mohammad Abu Hasira and 42 of his family members. On 23 November, photojournalist Mohammad Moin Ayyash and his family were killed by an Israeli airstrike.

==== Investigations ====
On 1 November, Reporters Without Borders asked the International Criminal Court to begin a priority war crimes investigation into the killing of nine journalists. RSF noted 41 journalists had been killed during the first month of the conflict, stating multiple journalists had been killed by Israel in their homes. Israel maintains records of the place and residence of every person in Gaza. RSF stated Israel had used targeted strikes to kill journalists in Gaza.

=== Health and aid workers ===
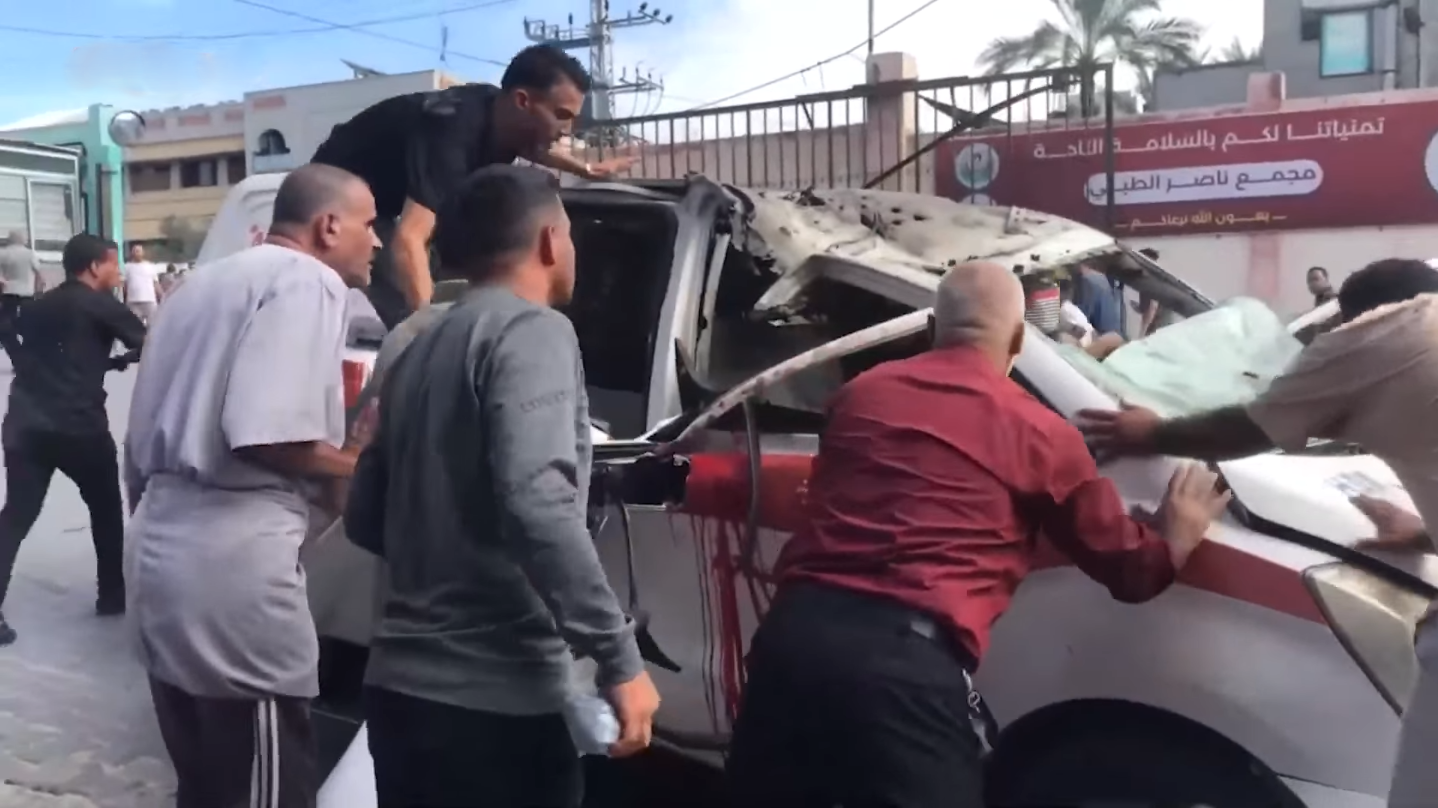
Palestine Red Crescent Society ambulance hit by an Israeli missile in Khan Yunis

On 11 October, UNRWA reported that nine of their workers were killed in an Israeli airstrike, and that its headquarters were being targeted by Israel. 11 members of UNRWA and five members of the Red Cross and Red Crescent were killed in Gaza since the start of the fighting. MSF said it had counted 16 medical personnel killed since 7 October. MSF said a nurse and an ambulance driver were killed, and several others injured in Israeli strikes on the Nasser hospital in Khan Yunis and the Indonesia Hospital in Gaza City. The Indonesian Medical Emergency Rescue Committee (MER-C) confirmed a staff member was killed near an operational MER-C vehicle.

On 22 October, UNRWA stated that 29 staff members had been killed in Gaza. On 30 October, the Palestinian Ministry of Health stated 120 medical staff had been killed in Gaza. On 10 November, the UN reported more than 100 employees had been killed by Israel. On 11 November, UNRWA rejected Israel's claims that UN workers were undercover Hamas agents. On 12 November, the UN noted three nurses at al-Shifa hospital were killed during the Siege of Gaza City. More UN workers were killed in Gaza than in any other conflict in world history. According to The Healthcare Workers Watch – Palestine, more than 400 healthcare workers have been killed in Gaza.

On 21 November, an Israeli airstrike on the Al-Awda Hospital killed three doctors. Doctors Without Borders shared the last words of one of the doctors, Mahmoud Abu Nujaila: "Whoever stays until the end will tell the story. We did what we could. Remember us." On 24 December, a UNDP worker was killed in an airstrike, along with 70 members of his family.

=== Missing and buried ===
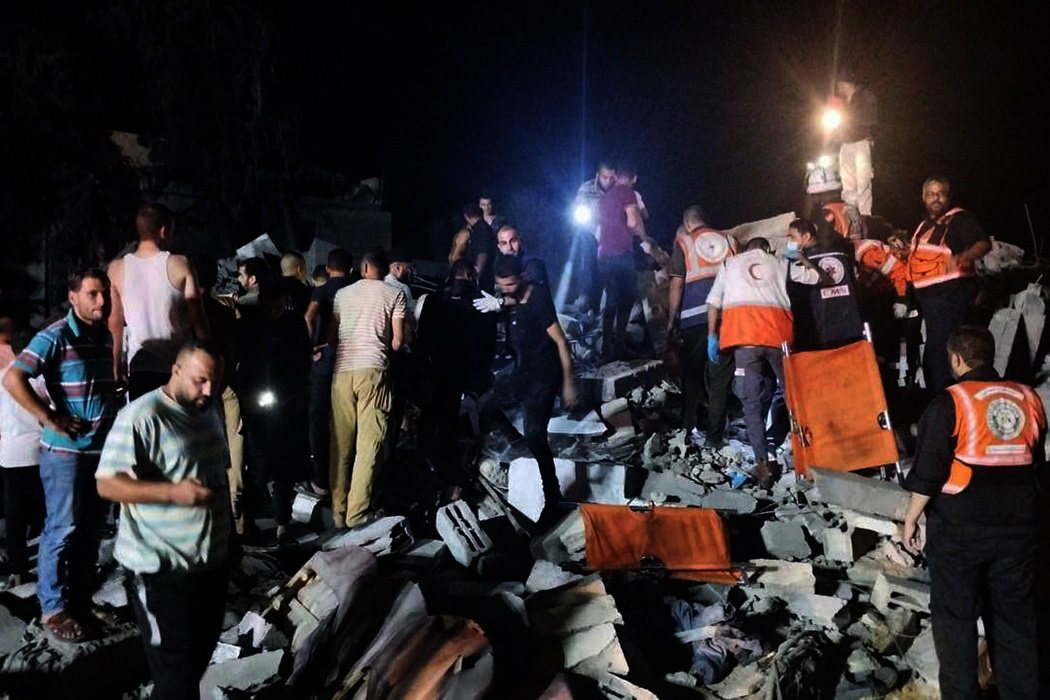
Rescue teams searching for survivors under rubble, October 2023

On 11 February 2026, roughly 8,000 people were reported missing beneath rubble. On 27 October 2023, the World Health Organization stated more than 1,000 unidentified people were buried under rubble. On 3 December 2023, the Palestinian Civil Defence stated the situation "beyond dire" as the organization was unable to rescue many people buried under rubble.

Individuals were rescued by aid workers after reportedly surviving several days buried underneath rubble. Emergency responders stated that part of what made rescue so difficult is that Israeli bombs tend to "flatten entire buildings". On 24 February 2024, Dr. Paul B. Spiegel stated that total death counts were undercounts due to the large number of people under rubble, stating, "We projected the number of deaths that may be missing, and it was probably up to about ten to fifteen per cent more." On 26 February 2024, Israeli warplanes bombed and destroyed an emergency rescue machinery in Beit Lahia.

According to The New York Times, "The buried make up a shadow death toll in Gaza, a leaden asterisk to the health ministry's official tally of more than 31,000 dead". In May 2024, a U.S. doctor described the deterioration of rescue operations in Gaza, stating, "We hear bombs and before my thought used to be 'what patients are we going to meet tomorrow?' And now we hear bombs and no one comes." The United Nations stated that more than 10,000 people were estimated to be buried under the rubble. Dr. Marwan al-Hams stated the number was so high because of the lack of heavy equipment or fuel to dig through concrete and steel to rescue them.

In late-June 2024 it was reported by Save the Children that up to 21,000 children are estimated to be missing due to the bombing and the ongoing war. While the organization acknowledged that it was difficult to collect and verify information in Gaza, it was believed that about 17,000 children were unaccompanied and separated, about 4,000 likely missing in the rubble and an unknown number in mass graves. In July 2024, emergency crews stated there were many people trapped under debris in the Tel al-Hawa neighborhood following heavy attacks by Israel.

Saadi Hassan Sulieman Baraka, a 64-year-old undertaker in Deir el-Balah, told Al Jazeera English in February 2024 that he had personally buried 17,000 people since October 2023. By August 2024, the dead were buried throughout the Gaza Strip, including in public spaces such as yards and streets. Scavenging animals have made it difficult to for emergency services to identify the bodies of killed Palestinians. In an October 2024 article, a returning IDF troop spoke about IDF procedures involving armored bull dozers, that have made it more difficult in identifying and recovering bodies of deceased Palestinians. A former IDF soldier recounted to the Knesset that soldiers were instructed to "run over terrorists (in Gaza), dead and alive, in the hundreds" adding that "everything squirts out".

== Israel ==
=== 7 October attacks ===
Gender percentage of 7 October deaths
Group	Source	% female	Reference
Total	AOAV	26.6%	(Note: "Of the total of 1,004 victims whose gender is identified, 735 (73.4%) of these were male, and 278 (26.6%) female.")
Civilians	Walla/TOI	36%	(Note: "But the Walla news site has published data by age and gender for 756 of the murdered civilians for which information is available...two girls...11 female...162 women...59 women...69 women...seven women." That totals 272 female killed out of 756 total civilians dead.)
Civilians	AOAV	41%	(Note: "Civilians has 217 male and 153 female killed.)
Military	AOAV	11%	(Note: "Military has 298 male and 38 female killed.)
Other security forces	AOAV	15%	(Note: "Police and rescue" has 22 male and 4 female killed.)

The number of deaths in the 7 October attacks, as published in December 2023, is 1,139: 695 Israeli civilians, 71 foreign nationals, and 373 security forces. This data was derived from social security data. There are additionally five people classed as missing, including four Israelis. The deaths included 36 children, of whom 20 were under 15 years old and the youngest was a 10-month-old baby.

Initially, Israel had reported 1,400 deaths from the attacks, but on 10 November it revised its casualty count to 1,200 after realizing that bodies that were so badly burnt were not Israeli but rather those of Hamas fighters. This included 859 civilians, 283 soldiers, 57 policemen, (Note: 59 policemen have been killed in the conflict, two of which died in the West Bank, leaving a total of 57 killed in the initial 7 October attack by Hamas.) and 10 Shin Bet members.

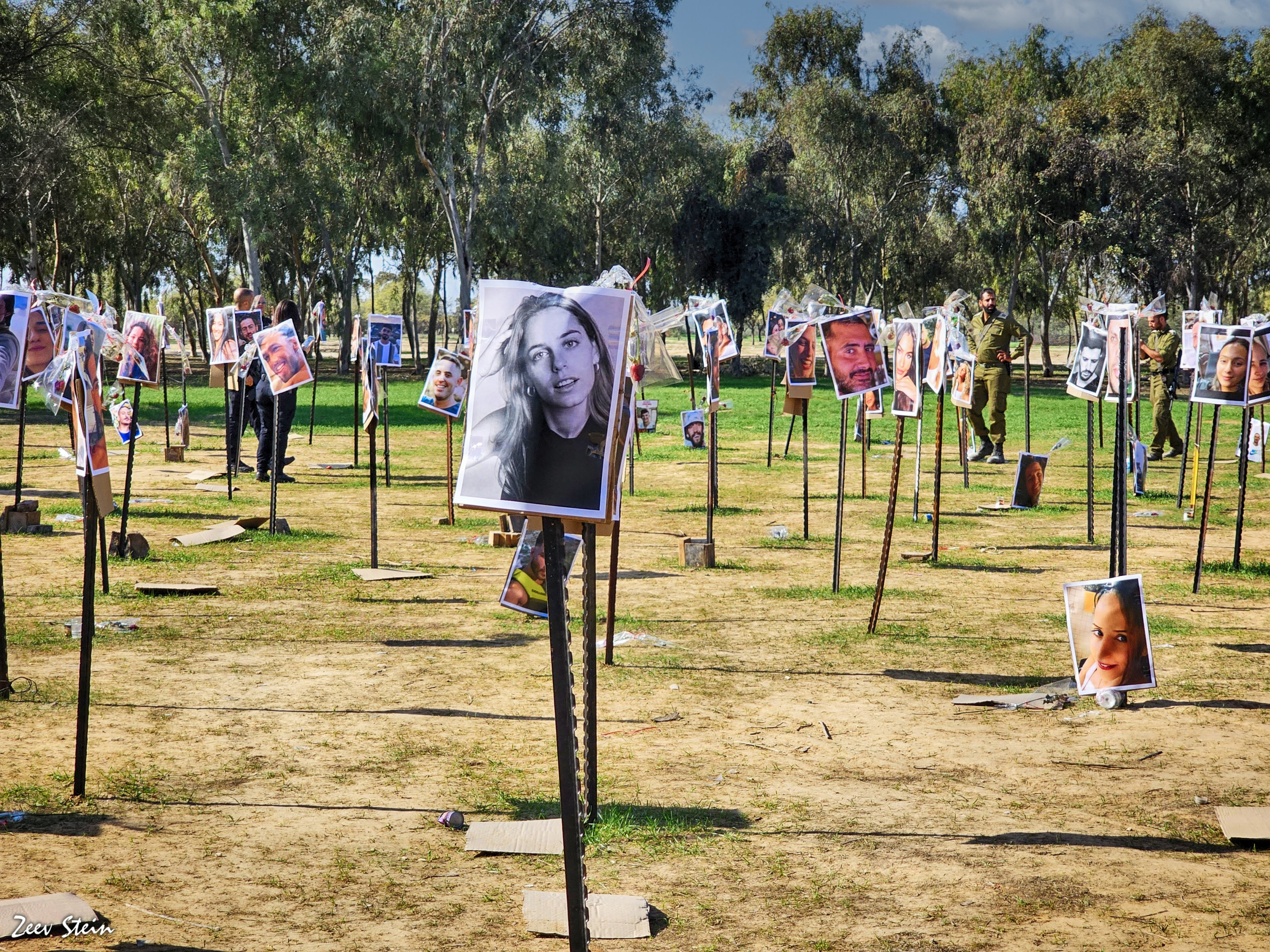
Israelis killed during Re'im music festival massacre

The casualties include approximately 70 dead or missing Arab-Israeli citizens, many of whom are Negev Bedouin. 14 Israeli children under 10 and 36 adolescents aged between 10 and 19 were initially believed to have been killed in the 7 October attack.

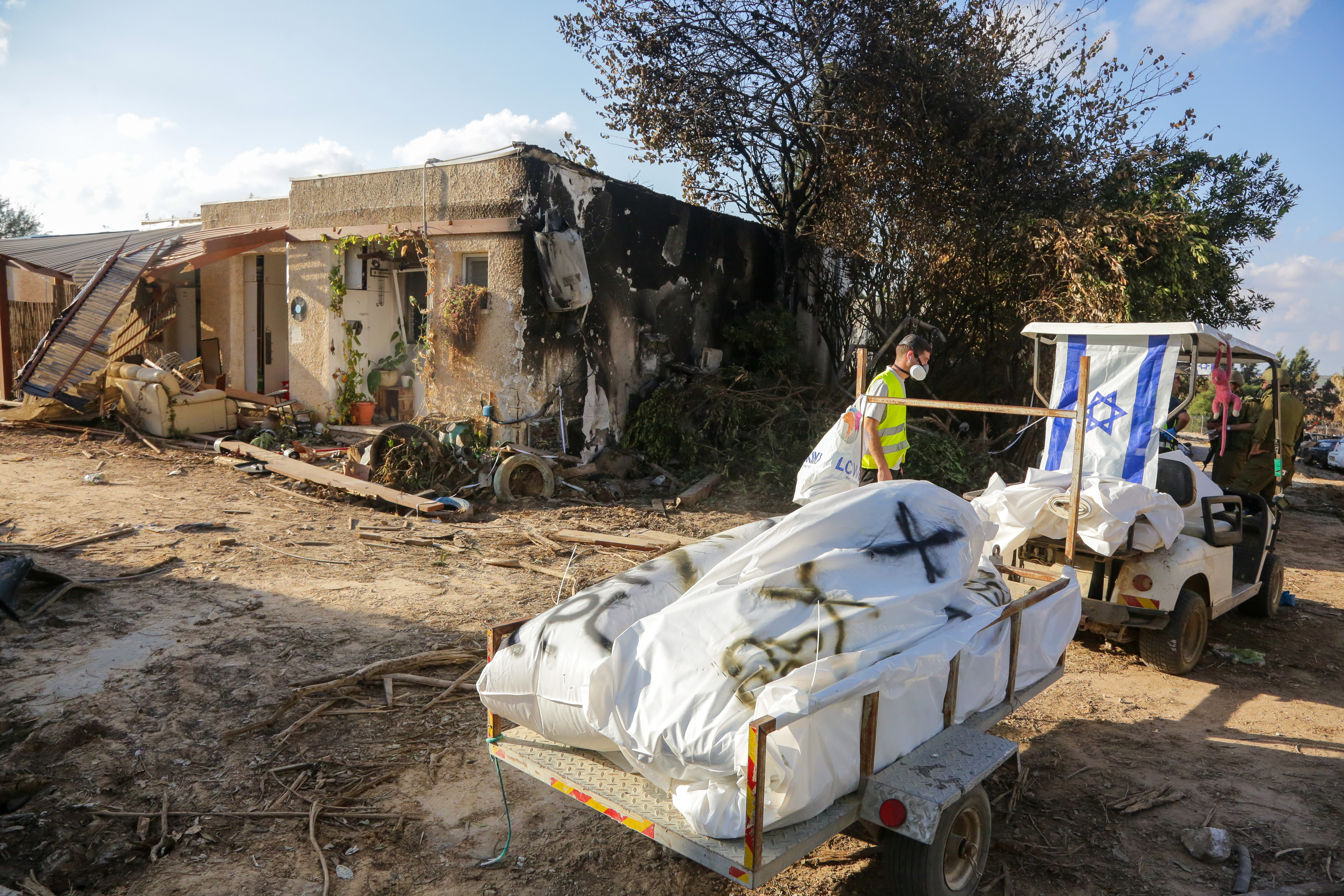
Collection and identification of remains after the Kfar Aza massacre on 15 October 2023

On 7 October, there were massacres at more than nine kibbutzim where civilians resided and at an outdoor dance music festival. Over 260 attendees were killed at the psychedelic trance open-air "Supernova Sukkot Gathering" music festival near the Re'im kibbutz. It became the deadliest concert attack ever and the worst Israeli civilian massacre in its history. Over 100 civilians were killed in the Be'eri massacre, including children. Many of the kibbutz residents among the dead or missing were peace activists, such as the 74-year-old Vivian Silver, a former board member of the human rights organisation B'Tselem. At least 50–100 people have been reported killed in the Kfar Aza massacre, with the total death toll unknown. Filmmaker Yahav Winner was killed in Kfar Aza. Many civilians were also killed in the Nahal Oz attack. Nine people were fatally shot at a bus shelter in Sderot, and at least 14 were killed by gunfire and grenades at a roadside bomb shelter near Re'im. At least four people were reported killed in Kuseife. At least 400 casualties were reported in Ashkelon, while 280 others were reported in Beer Sheva, 60 of whom were in serious condition. In the north, injuries from rocket attacks were reported in Tel Aviv.

Former Hapoel Tel Aviv F.C. striker Lior Asulin was among those killed in the Re'im music festival massacre. The head of the Sha'ar HaNegev Regional Council, Ofir Libstein, was killed in an exchange of fire with the militants. The police commander of Rahat, Jayar Davidov, was also killed. Izhar Peled, a police officer, was killed in Kfar Aza. The IDF confirmed that 258 of its soldiers had been killed. Among their confirmed dead were Colonel Yonatan Steinberg, the commander of the Nahal Brigade, who was killed near Kerem Shalom; Colonel Roi Levy, commander of the Refaim United, who was killed near Kibbutz Re'im; and Lieutenant Colonel Eli Ginsberg, commander of the LOTAR Counter-terrorism Unit School. The Druze deputy commander of the 300th "Baram" Regional Brigade, Lieutenant Colonel Alim Abdallah, was killed in action along with two other soldiers while responding to an infiltration from southern Lebanon on 9 October. Israeli peace activist Hayim Katsman was killed in Holit.

=== Invasion of Gaza ===
It was reported in April 2024 that since 27 October 2023, when Israel invaded the Gaza Strip, 260 Israeli soldiers had been killed, mainly during ground operations. On 15 June 2024 it was reported that eight IDF troops were killed while returning from an overnight operation near the Tal al-Sultan refugee camp in Rafah during the ongoing offensive. Per a statement, Hamas had fired a rocket at an Israeli army bulldozer and fired a second one as reinforcements arrived, reportedly causing the casualties.

The IDF said in July 2024 that a large number of tanks had been incapacitated in the course of the war, limiting the number of tanks available for training exercises. On 4 November, Hamas claimed that since 2 November they had destroyed 24 Israeli vehicles, including a tank, an APC, and a bulldozer with anti-armour weapons.

In September 2025, the Israeli Ministry of Defense's rehabilitation department reported that around 20,000 soldiers were treated since 7 October 2023, with around 1,000 being hospitalized per month. Around 45% had physical injuries, with 9% in moderate-to-severe condition, 35% experienced mental health conditions, and 20% experienced both physical wounds and mental health issues.

==== Mental health ====
In January 2024, it was reported that at least 1,600 IDF troops had been identified as showing symptoms of combat-related PTSD since the start of the ground invasion of Gaza and about 250 soldiers were discharged due to prolonged combat stress symptoms. According to IDF officials in February 2024, around 3,000 troops have been checked by the IDF's mental health system with 82% returning to active duty. While the IDF has not officially reported how many IDF troops returning from fighting in Gaza have committed suicide there was a noticed increase a year after the war began, with many indicating that they were not given appropriate care by medical and mental health officials.

=== Journalists in Israel ===
According to the Committee to Protect Journalists, two Israeli journalists, Roee Idan and Yaniv Zohar, have been killed.

=== Migrant workers ===
At least 50 migrant workers, primarily from Thailand and Nepal, were killed during Hamas' attack on 7 October and around 100,000 migrant workers are trapped in Israel during the conflict due to debt from large fees they had to pay to recruitment agencies to obtain the jobs.

== West Bank ==
OCHA reported that Israel killed 370 Palestinians in the West Bank between 7 October 2023 and 29 January 2024, including 94 children. 97% of these were killed by Israeli security forces and the remainder by Israeli settlers.

Several thousand Gazan workers were in Israel at the time when the conflict started. As of 16 October some of them were detained at a "holding facility" in the West Bank while others sought refuge in the Palestinian communities of the West Bank. The Minister of Labor for the Palestinian Authority estimated 4,500 workers are unaccounted for while Israeli media outlet N12 reported 4,000 Gazans were in Israeli holding facilities. The Palestinian Prisoners Society said that Israeli forces had arrested over 1,450 West Bank Palestinians since 7 October. On 29 October 30 Israeli human rights organizations addressed settler violence in the West Bank, asking the international community to "act urgently" to end it. On 30 October, the German government called on Israel to protect Palestinians in the West Bank. On 31 October, EU chief diplomat Josep Borrell "firmly condemned" settler attacks in the West Bank. Linda Thomas-Greenfield stated the United States was "deeply concerned," and condemned the killings of Palestinians in the West Bank.

== Lebanon ==
During clashes along the Israel–Lebanon border, an Israeli artillery strike on 13 October killed Reuters videographer Issam Abdallah and injured six other journalists from Reuters, Agence France-Presse and Al Jazeera.

By early April 2024, the IDF said it had killed more than 330 "terror operatives" in Lebanon, mostly members of Hezbollah, including 30 Hezbollah commanders.

== Yemen ==
Medical sources in Yemen reported that the Israeli warplanes' air raid on Hodeidah killed six people and wounded more than 80 civilians.

== Foreign and dual-national casualties ==
As of 21 January 2024, The Washington Post reported that persons from 35 countries had been killed or went missing during the conflict.

=== Table ===
Foreign casualties include both those killed by Palestinian militants inside Israel, as well as those killed by the IDF inside the Gaza Strip, the West Bank, and southern Lebanon.

Foreign casualties in the Gaza war
Country	Deaths	Hostages in the Gaza Strip	Missing	Ref.
Thailand	41	28	0	
France	40	Unknown	8	
United States	35	Unknown	13	
Ukraine	24	Unknown	8	
Russia	23	2	4	
Portugal	12	3	0	
Nepal	10	1	0	
United Kingdom	10	Unknown	10	
Argentina	9	Unknown	20	
Canada	9	Unknown	1	
Ethiopia	7	0	0	
Chile	5	0	0	
Philippines	5	Unknown	2	
Romania	5	1	2	
Austria	4	Unknown	1	
China	4	0	2	
Australia	3	Unknown	Unknown	
Belarus	3	Unknown	1	
Brazil	3	Unknown	0	
Turkey	3	Unknown	Unknown	
Colombia	2	Unknown	Unknown	
India	2	0	0	
Paraguay	2	Unknown	2	
Peru	2	Unknown	5	
South Africa	2	Unknown	Unknown	
Spain	2	0	0	
Sri Lanka	2	2	2	
Azerbaijan	1	Unknown	Unknown	
Cambodia	1	0	0	
Estonia	1	0	0	
Georgia	1	0	0	
Germany	1	5	Unknown	
Greece	1	0	0	
Honduras	1	Unknown	Unknown	
Ireland	1	Unknown	Unknown	
Italy	1	Unknown	2	
Kazakhstan	1	0	0	
Latvia	1	0	0	
Lithuania	1	0	0	
Mexico	1	2	0	
Moldova	1	0	0	
Poland	1	1	0	
Switzerland	1	Unknown	Unknown	
Tanzania	1	1	2	
Denmark	0	1	0	
Serbia	0	1	0	

=== Further details ===
The Nepali ambassador to Israel, Kanta Rijal, said at least seven of its nationals in the country were injured in the attack, and that they along with ten others were held captive by Hamas at Kibbutz Alumim. The Nepalese embassy later confirmed that 10 Nepalese students were killed during the attack in the kibbutz. Israeli media also reported that migrant workers from Thailand and the Philippines were also taken captive by Palestinian militants. The Philippine government confirmed that four Filipinos were killed while two others were injured in the attacks, with authorities verifying reports of Filipinos being held captive by Hamas. 26 Filipinos were rescued by Israeli security forces, while two Filipinos were unaccounted for. At least 28 Thais were killed and 17 were captured by Hamas at Kibbutz Alumim. The reason for Hamas attacking the foreign workers' living quarters was because security guards successfully defended the main kibbutz residential area from invasion so they attacked softer targets. There were no guards stationed at the mostly Asian-inhabited living quarters.

A German-Israeli national, Shani Louk, was killed while attending the Re'im music festival; a video of Palestinians parading her near-naked body in a car was circulated on the internet. Several other German citizens were reported to be among those kidnapped by militants. At least 17 British citizens were reported as dead or missing, including one attendee of the music festival. 18 Ukrainians, a Cambodian student, and a Chilean woman were confirmed to have been killed by Hamas. 13 French citizens were killed, with an additional 17 missing, including four children.

At least 31 Americans were killed during the attacks and 13 others were missing. Mexico's Secretary of Foreign Affairs reported that two Mexican nationals were presumed to have been taken hostage by Hamas. One Brazilian national was reported as injured and three were reported missing. An Indian caregiver was injured by a rocket barrage in Ashkelon. The British embassy confirmed the death of a British national who attended the music festival.

Spanish foreign minister José Manuel Albares said two Spaniards were attacked without specifying their condition. Italian Foreign Minister Antonio Tajani stated that an Italian-Israeli couple went missing in Be'eri. Two Tanzanian students were reported by their embassy to be missing. The Russian Embassy stated that 16 Russian nationals were killed and nine others went missing following the attack. Four Argentinians were reported to have been killed and three were reported missing.

The Canadian government stated that three Canadians were killed, and that two other Canadians were missing. A Paraguayan couple was reported killed, with the government also reporting two nationals missing. An Irish attendee of the music festival was reported missing. The Ministry of Foreign Affairs of Peru confirmed that a Peruvian-Israeli soldier was killed in action on the front line, while three remained missing. A Colombian couple attending the music festival was reported missing after the attack. The Austrian Ministry of Foreign Affairs reported that three Austrian-Israeli dual nationals had been captured, and that one of them had later been confirmed dead. South Africa's Department of International Relations and Cooperation confirmed that two citizens, including a dual national, were killed.

In Gaza, a Ukrainian national was confirmed to have been killed.

== Hostages in Gaza ==
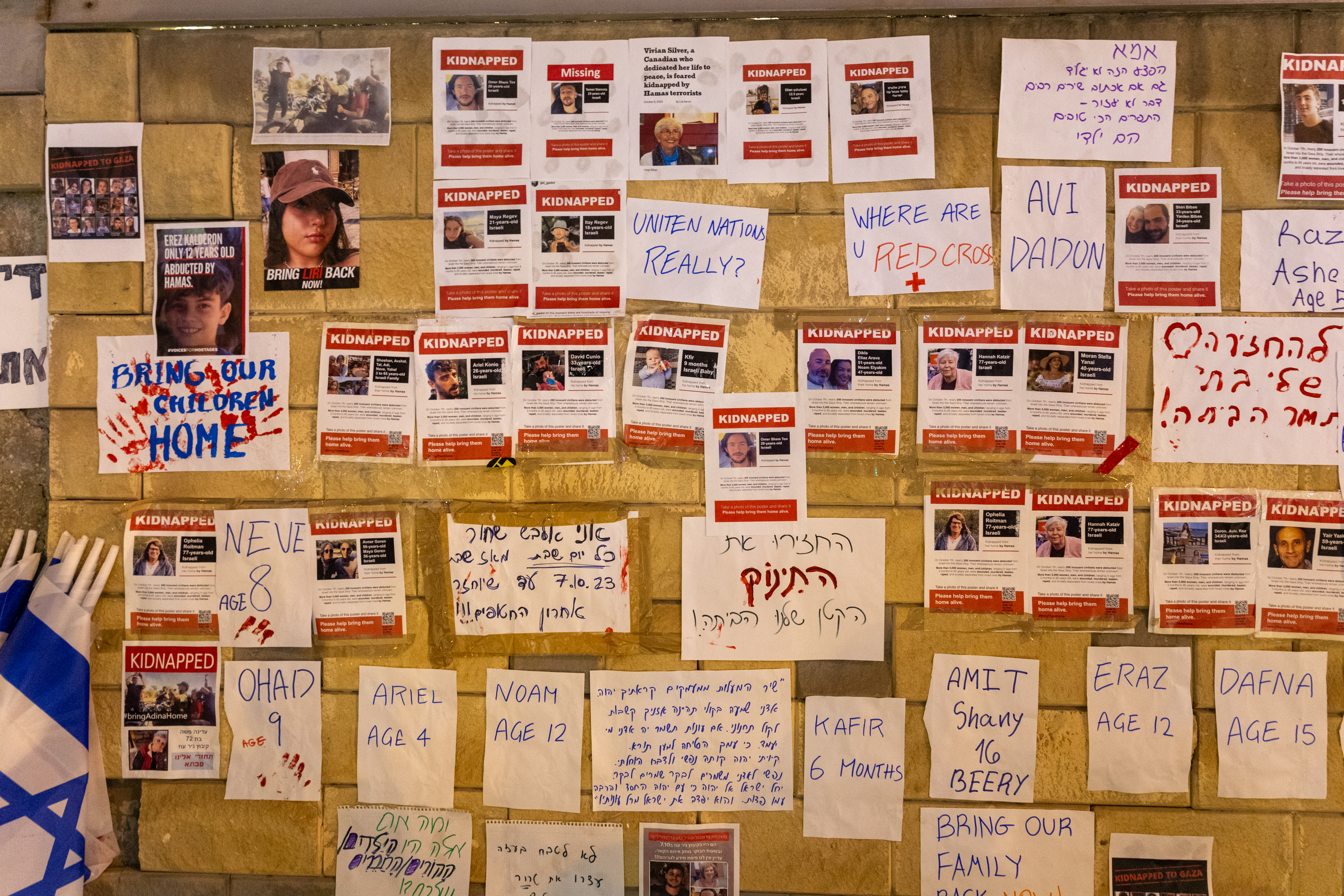
Posters in Tel Aviv calling for the return of Israeli hostages in Gaza

248 people were taken hostage during the October 7 attacks, mostly civilians. On 8 October, Palestinian Islamic Jihad claimed to be holding at least 30 captives. At least four people were reported taken from Kfar Aza. Videos from Gaza appeared to show captured people, with Gazan residents cheering trucks carrying dead bodies. Israel reported four captives were killed in Be'eri, while Hamas indicated that an IDF airstrike on Gaza on 9 October killed four captives.

Civilians believed to be held captive in Gaza include families, children, festival-goers, peace activists, caregivers, and elders such as 75-year-old historian Alex Dancyg, who has written books on Poland's Jewish community and The Holocaust, was taken from Nir Oz. Also at Nir Oz, six members of the Silberman-Bibas family were caught on video being taken from their home; on 11 October, Hamas released a video showing three of them being let go near the border fence. On 16 October, Hamas released a video of one of its hostages, a 21-year-old French Israeli woman who had sustained injuries to her arm and a scar. On 20 October, Hamas released an American woman and her 17-year-old daughter who were taken while visiting relatives in Nahal Oz. According to a report sent to the International Committee of the Red Cross by the Israeli organization Hostages and Missing Families Forum, hostages include people with Parkinson's disease, multiple sclerosis, cardiovascular disease, diabetes, cancer, dementia, autism and psychiatric disorders, who are "in urgent need of treatment and lifesaving medication", and are "prone to immediate mortality [without] essential medications and treatment." The report also expressed concern about untreated injuries induced during the attack.

An open letter published in The Lancet by a group of 1,500 Israeli health-care professionals expressed shock at "the greatest loss of civilian life since the establishment of the state of Israel", and the indiscriminate "barbaric rampage" through "entire villages in the south of Israel", which it termed a "crime against humanity". The letter called on the international medical community to "condemn the savage massacre, to immediately call for guarantees for the safety and health of all those being kept hostage, and to unequivocally call for the immediate and unconditional return of our families and friends who have been cruelly taken hostage".

American-Israeli author Robby Berman set up a fund offering a reward of 1 million Israeli shekels for the release of hostages in Gaza, specifically aimed at encouraging Palestinians to aid in the rescue of Jewish prisoners.

== Palestinians imprisoned in Israel ==
Thousands of Palestinians working in Israel on the eve of the war have gone missing. Human rights groups believe they have subjected to mass arrests by Israel, but Israel has refused to release the names of those whom they are holding. According to testimonies obtained by HaMoked and Al-Jazeera some of these prisoners have been beaten by Israeli soldiers and denied access to contact the Red Cross. Eight of the workers were interviewed by CNN made claims of torture, including being stripped naked, "viciously" beaten, including one account of electrocution. One prisoner reported; “They broke us and beat us with batons and metal sticks... they humiliated us... they have made us starve without food or water,” whilst another claimed "some people died on the way here because they were beaten and subjected to electric shocks." The interviewed workers were eventually returned to Gaza on 4 November. At least six human rights organizations in Israel have filed a petition to Israel's High Court arguing these detentions were "without legal authority and without legal grounds." Amani Sarahneh of Palestinian Prisoners Society and Dror Sadot of B’Tselem both described the issue as systemic, with Sadot stating in response; “We've been investigating this for so many years – the military enforcement system works as a whitewash mechanism with almost no indictments,” she said. “So they will say ‘those are the exception, not the rule,’ but if the impunity for soldiers continues – and not just the soldiers but also the policy itself – when no one's being held accountable, of course, things will just continue,”

== Reactions and analysis ==
Both Israel and Hamas have been accused of committing war crimes. South Africa accused Israel of committing genocide in a case it brought before the International Court of Justice. In a set of preliminary rulings, the court found that the Palestinians' rights under the genocide convention were plausibly in danger but did not rule on whether genocide was plausibly happening. In June 2024, a UN Commission of Inquiry found the scale of Israel's killing of Palestinians constituted a crime against humanity. Marwan Bishara, the senior political analyst at Al Jazeera English, argued that Israel's military campaign aimed to "eliminate anything that walks or breathes in Gaza". Hani Mahmoud, a journalist on the ground in Gaza, wrote, "It's difficult to imagine that the Israeli military has any clear objective other than the mass murder of civilians inside their homes."

In August 2024, the UNRWA Chief of Staff, Ben Majekodunmi, stated that the reported killing of 40,000 people since October 2023 was an "unspeakable tragedy". Islamic Relief, a UK-based humanitarian organization, stated that the killing of 40,000 should be a "source of eternal global shame". UN rights chief Volker Türk stated, "This unimaginable situation is overwhelmingly due to recurring failures by the Israeli Defense Forces to comply with the rules of war". UNRWA spokesperson Louise Wateridge stated, "It does feel like people are waiting for death. Death seems to be the only certainty in this situation".

In July 2024, correspondence published in British medical journal The Lancet issued a warning that casualty figures based on direct death tolls alone significantly underestimated the total, and conservatively estimated that the conflict up to June would in the coming months and years result in up to 186,000 deaths when direct and indirect deaths were accounted for. Jean-François Corty, a humanitarian doctor and president of the NGO Doctors of the World, said that the Gaza Health Ministry's figures take into account the identified dead, "without taking into account all the dead left under the rubble of the bombardments, or the indirect victims who died because of a lack of care or access to care, or from being transported to a health centre. If you add those who are likely to die of malnutrition or as a result of wounds inflicted by Israeli bombardments in the weeks and months to come, because of the risks of superinfection and because their pathology will be treated late, then yes, the figure of 186,000 deaths mentioned in The Lancet is credible." The Lancet correspondence has been criticized by the Chair of Every Casualty Counts network Michael Spagat, who wrote that it "lacks a solid foundation and is implausible".

In January 2025, a peer-reviewed analysis was published in The Lancet regarding mortality due to traumatic injury in the Gaza Strip between 7 October 2023 and 30 June 2024. The research was conducted by scholars from the University of Cambridge, Yale University, London School of Hygiene and Tropical Medicine and Nagasaki University. The paper utilized a model with "three-list capture–recapture analysis using data from Palestinian Ministry of Health (MoH) hospital lists, an MoH online survey, and social media obituaries", and estimated 64,260 deaths from traumatic injury during this period, likely exceeding 70,000 by October 2024, with 59.1% of them being women, children and the elderly. It concluded the GHM undercounted trauma-related deaths by 41% in its reports. It also noted that its findings "underestimate the full impact of the military operation in Gaza, as they do not account for non-trauma-related deaths resulting from health service disruption, food insecurity, and inadequate water and sanitation."

== See also ==
Gaza war

- Bearing Witness to the 7 October Massacre
- Gaza war § Casualties
- Impact of the Gaza war
- Outline of the Gaza war
- List of journalists killed in the Gaza war
- List of civilians killed in the Gaza war
- War crimes in the Gaza war

General

- Casualties of Israeli attacks on the Gaza Strip
- Israeli casualties of war – Overview of Israeli casualties during armed conflict
- Palestinian casualties of war

Prior conflicts

- Battle of Rafah (1949) – Military engagement between Israel and Egypt
- Battle of Gaza (2007) – Hamas takeover of the Gaza Strip from Fatah
- Battle of Rafah (2009) – Conflict between Hamas and Jund Ansar Allah in the Gaza Strip
- 2014 Gaza War – Armed conflict in the Gaza Strip
