= Gaza Health Ministry =

Government ministry of Palestine

Palestinian Ministry of Health – Gaza
- Arabic: وزارة الصحة الفلسطينية – غزة
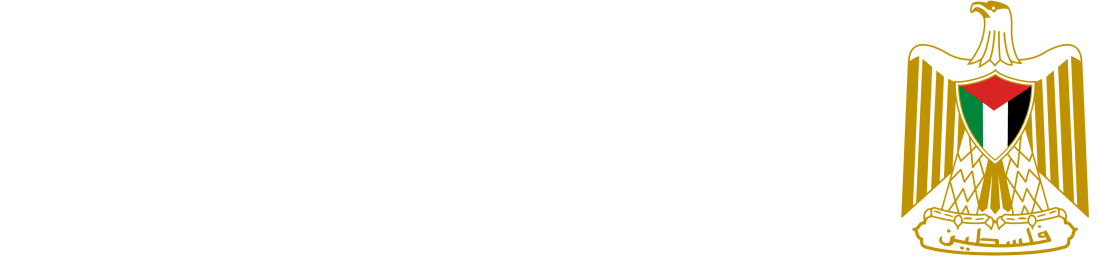

Agency overview
- Formed: 2007; 19 years ago
- Jurisdiction: (Palestine) Government of Hamas
- Headquarters: Gaza City, Gaza Strip, Palestine
- Agency executive: Medhat Abbas, Director-General
- Website: www.moh.gov.ps

The Gaza Health Ministry (GHM), officially the Palestinian Ministry of Health – Gaza, is responsible for managing healthcare and medical services in the Gaza Strip. The health ministry's casualty reports have received significant attention during the course of the Gaza–Israel conflict. Its numbers have historically been considered reliable by the United Nations, the World Health Organization, and Human Rights Watch.

In relation to the Gaza war, two letters published in The Lancet journal did not find evidence of inflation or fabrication of Palestinian casualty numbers. A peer-reviewed analysis published by The Lancet in January 2025 concluded the GHM had undercounted deaths due to traumatic injury by 41% in its reports on the Gaza war, with the total estimated traumatic injury deaths as of October 2024 probably exceeding 70,000 as opposed to the GHM's reported 41,909—59.1% of them being women and children and the elderly.

Another independent peer-reviewed analysis of casualties was published in The Lancet by Michael Spagat and other researchers. They estimated 75,200 violent deaths and 8,540 excess non-violent deaths between 7 October 2023 and 5 January 2025. The estimate of violent deaths is 34.7% higher than the GHM's casualty count at the time. Of the violent deaths, the researchers estimate that 56.2% were women, children, and elderly individuals.

== History ==
The Palestinian territories are served by parallel ministries of health operating in Gaza and the West Bank, overseen by a single government ministry of health based in Ramallah. Following Hamas' takeover of Gaza in 2007, the Hamas government in the Gaza Strip has appointed its own alternate health ministers, but the Palestinian Authority (PA) retains power over it, paying salaries and supplying it with medical equipment.

A month-long doctors' strike ensued after Hamas' takeover of Gaza, due to political disputes. The new Gaza government, with Basem Naim as Health Minister, replaced Fatah-affiliated hospital directors and staff with those identifying with Hamas. Jomaa Alsaqqa, a 20-year surgeon at al-Shifa Hospital, lost his job due to his Fatah support and faced arrests and assaults since the Hamas takeover. In response, Naim stated "the hospital managers weren't fired for political reasons: they were fired because of managerial, financial, and moral corruption in the hospitals." In 2023 officials said the ministry is a mix of recent Hamas hires and older civil servants affiliated with the secular nationalist Fatah party.

The current director-general of the Gaza Health Ministry is Medhat Abbas.

On 17 November 2023, amid the Israeli invasion of the Gaza Strip, the head of Médecins Sans Frontières in Palestine stated the Gaza Health Ministry had been "decimated", and Gaza's health sector had been "systematically destroyed".

A July 2026 article published in The Daily Telegraph reported on claims that ministry officials were accepting bribes to put healthy people on a list of those requiring evacuation for medical treatment abroad or to move sick people to higher positions on the list. The Health Ministry stated that a process to "verify medical cases" would be created, in response to the claims.

== Casualty reports ==
Gaza Health Ministry (GHM) fatality reportage deviation2008–2021.
Conflict	According to GHM	According to the UN	Deviation
Gaza War (2008–2009)	1,440	1,385	4.0%
2014 Gaza War	2,310	2,251	2.6%
2021 Israel–Palestine crisis	260	256	1.6%

As of 26 October 2023, the Gaza Health Ministry (GHM) was the sole official source of data on Palestinian casualties in Gaza during the Gaza war, although these numbers are also published by the West Bank-based Palestinian health ministry, which confirms them with its Gaza-based staff. The health ministry's numbers have historically been considered reliable by the United Nations, the World Health Organization, Human Rights Watch. The United States Department of State cited its numbers in a public report in March 2023.

The casualty figures provided by the ministry do not distinguish the difference between civilians and combatants or provide the cause of death. The percentage of civilian deaths is only calculated post-conflict by the UN and various rights groups.

=== Methodology ===
The sources for the GHM casualty data include death counts from hospitals, media reports (subsequently denied by the ministry) and a publicly available online form which allows families to record deaths.

The GHM released a full list of the people killed at the time since 7 October, a 200-page document with 6,747 identified individuals listing their names, ages, and ID number as well as 281 unidentified victims. Omar Shakir, Israel and Palestine director at Human Rights Watch, said "the numbers coming out of the ministry are not beyond reason", and noted a grey area in differentiating combatants from civilians among the dead, as well as emphasized that immediately released figures may often be different from those ultimately based on recorded data.

Palestinian political analyst Nour Odeh has asserted the process of issuing death certificates is not done by political figures, but by health professionals, insisting "this process enables families to deal with issues such as inheritance and custody of children whose parents have died." Director of Kamal Adwan Hospital, Ahmed al-Kahlot, denied that the GHM was unduly influenced by Hamas' control, stating that "Hamas is one of the factions. Some of us are aligned with Fatah, some are independent." and "More than anything, we are medical professionals."

As of 29 February 2024, the Gaza Health Ministry stated that its daily tallies now rely upon "a combination of accurate death counts from hospitals that are still partially operating, and on estimates from media reports to assess deaths in the north of Gaza", but did not "cite or say which sources those are." On 31 March, it stated that 15,070 fatalities (45.8% of the then total) had been compiled via "reliable media sources" instead of direct reporting. The Ministry further clarified in reports made on 1 April and 4 April that it had “incomplete data” for 12,263 (later reduced 11,371) of its 33,091 reported fatalities.

The methodology for the counts was outlined by Health Information Center head Zaher al-Wahaidi in April 2024. The destruction and disruption of Gaza's health infrastructure had left only three of the eight hospitals responsible for reporting deaths able to contribute data, forcing the ministry to rely increasingly on journalists and first responders to record otherwise unidentified fatalities. The ministry also introduced remote registration through an online form and by phone. Confirmed submissions were used to identify deaths already represented in the unidentified tally, with a corresponding unidentified death removed rather than an additional death being added to the overall count. al-Wahaidi said that 55% of those identified through this system were men, largely because widows used it to register their husbands' deaths in order to obtain government assistance. Sky News said its analysis did not suggest that unidentified fatalities were being used to inflate the overall death toll, while Human Rights Watch's Omar Shakir said the reported toll was probably an undercount.

By August 2024, al-Wahaidi reported that the ministry's casualty-recording system had substantially recovered. He clarified that the phrase previously translated as "reliable media sources" was actually "reliable sources", and said the ministry did not rely on press reports for its casualty data. All of Gaza's major functioning hospitals had been reconnected to the Health Information Centre's central database and could again transmit detailed information automatically. The ministry was also using an online registration system for deaths that had not previously been fully identified. Of fatalities reported through the form in July, 55% had passed through a hospital but remained unidentified, 22% had been buried without reaching a hospital, and 23% were missing or presumed to be under the rubble. Before a reported death was confirmed, the family was required to present the case to a judicial committee and the public prosecutor verified that the death had occurred and resulted from the war rather than natural causes. If the deceased had already passed through a hospital, a corresponding entry was removed from the unidentified tally, preventing the confirmation from increasing the overall count a second time. By 6 August, 6,187 deaths had been confirmed through the online system, while the proportion of unidentified fatalities had fallen from 46% on 31 March to 18%. Paul Spiegel, director of the Center for Humanitarian Health at Johns Hopkins University, said that many deaths remained uncounted and noted that the ministry reported only traumatic deaths, excluding increased indirect mortality from causes such as cardiovascular disease, diabetes, and maternal deaths. He therefore considered the reported toll likely an underestimate.

In April 2025, al-Wahaidi said that many names submitted through the online form had been removed from published updates as a precaution pending judicial investigation. He said some were found to have died of natural causes, while others were alive but imprisoned or were missing without sufficient evidence that they had died. Until October 2024, names submitted through the form could be added to the published list before undergoing judicial confirmation. Since October, submissions had undergone judicial confirmation before publication. Gabriel Epstein of The Washington Institute for Near East Policy said there's no reason to think the errors are due to deliberate manipulation to inflate the number of women and children among the casualties as the precautionary removals only slightly reduced the share of women and children in the official list. Professor Michael Spagat of research group Action on Armed Violence (AOAV) concurred with this, stating that he did not detect an attempt to mislead by health officials while seeing the changes as "a big clean-up operation".

=== Analysis by academic researchers ===
Two letters published in The Lancet found that the GHM numbers were plausible and credible: the first was authored by scholars at the London School of Hygiene and Tropical Medicine, and the second by scholars at Johns Hopkins University. The Johns Hopkins University letter verified GHM reported deaths by looking at the UNRWA's reported deaths of its staff members. The UNRWA reported deaths are also publicly available, and independent of the GHM casualty reports. The authors found that the GHM reported death rate (5.3 deaths per 1000) was consistent with data reported by UNRWA (7.8 deaths per 1000, as of 10 November 2023). It also found temporal consistency between the two independent reports.

The London School of Hygiene and Tropical Medicine conducted several analyses on the data and concluded it was "implausible" that GHM engaged in data fabrication. The authors found that GHM's reported crude mortality rate in the age bracket of 20-59 years was broadly similar to the mortality rate of UNRWA employees and the mortality rate of Gaza's health-care workers (reported by the World Health Organization). The authors also found that the number of buildings reported damaged by the Hamas-run Gaza Ministry of Public Works was consistent with satellite imagery-based estimates conducted by Sky News (both arrived at the figure of 7%). The authors looked at 7,028 reported deaths (7-26 October), and found only one case of a duplicated identification number and one case of implausible age.

In January 2025 a peer-reviewed analysis of deaths due to traumatic injury in the Israel-Hamas war between October 2023 and 30 June 2024 was published in The Lancet. The research was conducted by scholars from the University of Cambridge, Yale University, London School of Hygiene and Tropical Medicine and Nagasaki University. The paper utilized a model with "three-list capture–recapture analysis using data from Palestinian Ministry of Health (MoH) hospital lists, an MoH online survey, and social media obituaries", and estimated over 70,000 deaths from traumatic injuries as of October 2024, with 59.1% of them being women, children and the elderly. It concluded the GHM's count of trauma-related deaths was too low by about 41%. It also noted that its findings "underestimate the full impact of the military operation in Gaza, as they do not account for non-trauma-related deaths resulting from health service disruption, food insecurity, and inadequate water and sanitation."

=== Other analyses ===
In March 2024 Columbia professor Les Roberts argued that GHM numbers were accurate, citing the two Lancet papers and other data. Professor Michael Spagat of research group AOAV stated that the GHM provides very detailed and real-time information about casualties in the war, that far exceeds the quality of reporting from conflicts such as Ukraine. He did note that this quality has declined over time, due to Israeli attacks on hospitals, and thus the GHM is relying on first responders and media sources. Writing in April 2024, Spagat also noted the deteriorating quality of data with hundreds of duplicate, missing or invalid IDs, accounting for roughly 1/7 of the total. However in September 2024 he said the GHM had improved the quality and accuracy of its data in its latest report.

According to the AP in June 2024, the ministry's public statements regarding the share of women and children continuing to be the majority part of casualties in April 2024 was contradicted by its own detailed data, which suggested a decline in women and children casualties as a share of casualties. In October 2024 AOAV published a report based on the GHM's latest data concluding that at least 74% of the at the time 40,717 Gazan fatalities identified by the Ministry were civilians, and that even this is likely to be an underestimate.

In October 2024 Nature's News Explainer interviewed several researchers about the difficulties in establishing the death toll in Gaza. Some researchers stated that the numbers published by the GHM underestimate casualties, while an independent Israeli researcher said they are probably overestimated. Those saying it is an underestimate referred to those killed remaining under the rubble, and friends and relatives not knowing they have died so not reporting them as deaths, or not wanting to report their deaths. The independent researcher said the figures in the July list from the ministry's hospital morgue system are likely accurate, but the total figures are probably overestimated as it could include missing people or deaths unrelated to the war. Spagat said the ministry's figures are overall "pretty good" as they include detailed information about most of the deaths.

=== US and Israel ===
Historically, the US State Department has relied on the GHM data for its annual human rights reports. For example, it cited GHM numbers in a public report in March 2023. On 26 October 2023, US President Joe Biden stated he had "no confidence" in the casualty numbers being reported. Subsequently, National Security Council spokesperson John Kirby asserted that the death toll cannot be taken "at face value". However, the US Assistant Secretary of State for Near Eastern Affairs said that actual death toll could be "even higher" than what the GHM reported. On 10 November 2023, The Wall Street Journal reported that the US intelligence community has growing confidence that death toll reports from the Gaza Health Ministry are roughly accurate. The article also reported that despite the growing confidence of US officials, they did not have enough information to confirm for sure.

In January 2024, Israeli news magazine Mekomit reported that Israeli intelligence officials had concluded that Health Ministry casualty reports are generally reliable and are used in briefings to senior officials. In follow-up reporting, an unnamed official told Vice News, "The numbers are heavily relied upon for official briefings on civilian casualties because with the exception of strikes on high-value targets, where senior officials are briefed on collateral damage, no civilian casualty figures or estimates are collected [by the Israeli military]." Aharon Haliva, the former head of Israel's Military Intelligence Directorate, was recorded saying, "that there are already 50,000 dead in Gaza is necessary and required for future generations". This figure lends further credence to the reliability of GHM casualty figures.

In June 2024, the U.S. House of Representatives passed an amendment to the annual U.S. State Department appropriations bill that would bar the department from citing casualty figures from the Gaza Health Ministry. The Ministry's numbers are, according to The Intercept, likely to be an undercount, as many bodies remain under rubble and so are unaccounted for. The Intercept called the amendment an attempt to conceal Gaza's death toll. The bill has been called by one Democratic staffer as evidence of anti-Palestinian racism in the House, and by US representative Rashida Tlaib as an example of genocide denial.

The Biden administration ultimately changed to faith in the health ministry statistics.

The GHM's casualty count was also initially disputed by the Trump administration but was later cited by President Trump.

In January 2026, an IDF official acknowledged the Gaza Health Ministry's estimate of about 70,000 Palestinians killed during the war, emphasising that the figure does not distinguish between members and non-members of militant groups, does not indicate how many people died as a result of the fighting, and does not include missing residents who may be buried under rubble. The official also rejected the ministry’s figures that 440 Palestinians had died because of malnutrition and starvation during the war.

== List of GHM health ministers ==
#	Name	Party	Time in office
1	Basem Naim	Hamas	June 2007 – January 2009
2	Mufiz al-Makhalalati	Hamas	April 2009 – unknown
3	Medhat Abbas	Hamas	2023 – present

== See also ==
- Attacks on health facilities during the Gaza war
- COVID-19 pandemic in Palestine
- Fatah–Hamas conflict
- Gaza genocide
- Israeli bombing of the Gaza Strip
