= Medhat Abbas =

Palestinian health official

- مدحت عباس

Director-General for the Gaza Health Ministry
- Incumbent
- Assumed office January 2023

Personal details
- Party: Hamas

Medhat Abbas (Arabic: مدحت عباس, romanized: Midḥat ʿAbbās) is a Palestinian doctor and the director-general for the Palestinian Ministry of Health of Gaza, serving in this position since January 2023.

== Career ==
He was the chair of the international cooperation department for Gaza's health ministry during the 2008–2009 Gaza war. Then he went on to become director-general for both Al-Shifa Hospital and Al-Aqsa Hospital in the Gaza Strip. First, he assumed the position at Al-Shifa during the 2012 Gaza War, and later assuming the same position at Al-Aqsa Hospital in Deir al-Balah during the 2014 Gaza War.

During the Gaza war, Abbas implicated Israel in delaying the delivery of several X-ray machines into hospitals in Gaza, causing delays in treating "thousands of patients".
