= Paul B. Spiegel =

Canadian physician

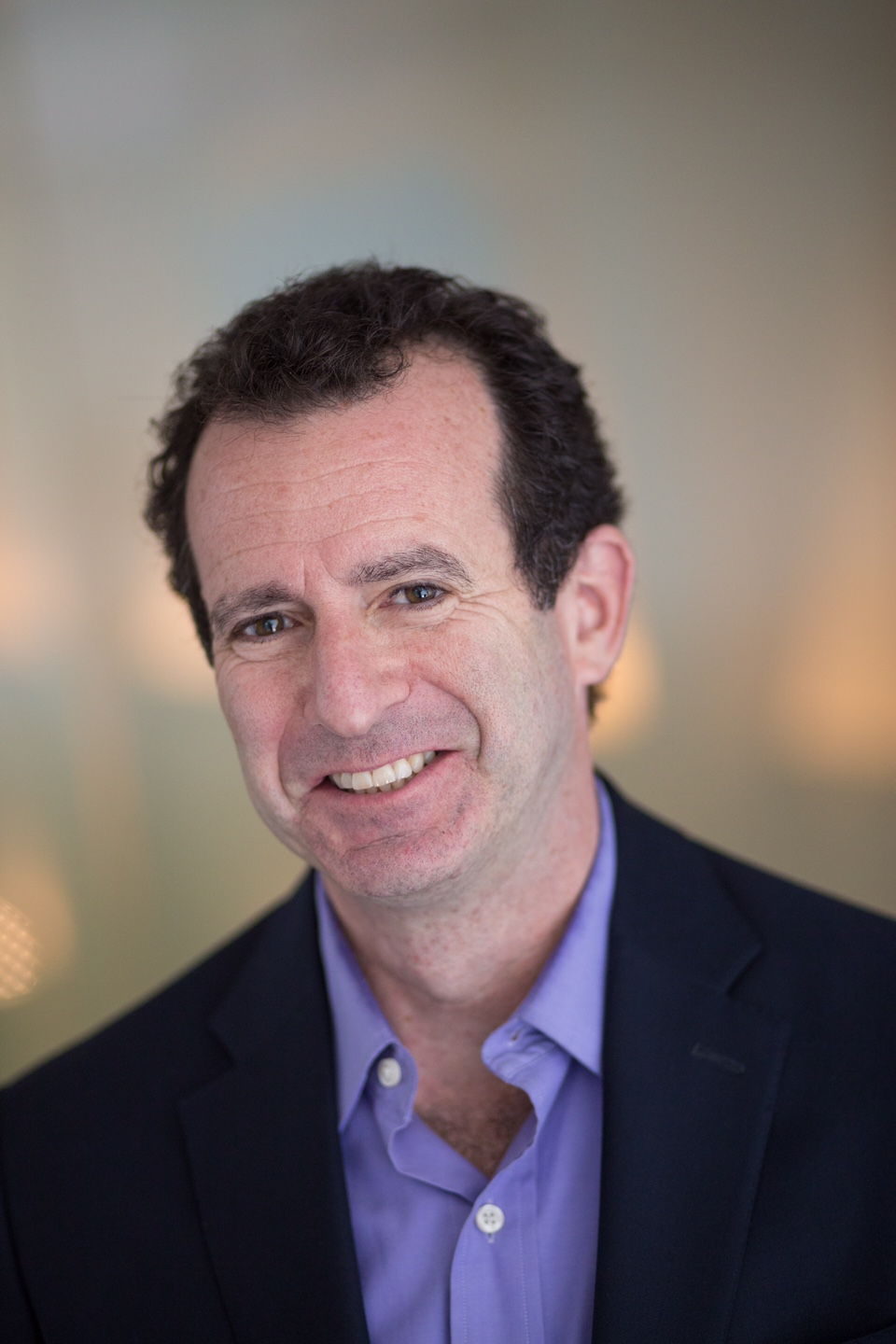
Spiegel

Paul B. Spiegel (born 1965) is a Canadian physician, epidemiologist, and academic who specializes in humanitarian health.

He is the Director of the Center for Humanitarian Health and Distinguished Professor of Practice at the Johns Hopkins Bloomberg School of Public Health. He has over 30 years of operational field and research experience in humanitarian emergencies, migration, conflict and displacement.

== Early life and education ==
Spiegel was born in Toronto, Canada.

He has a bachelor's degree from Western University in 1987, a degree in medicine from the University of Toronto in 1991, and a masters in public health from the Johns Hopkins Bloomberg School of Public Health in 1996.

== Career ==
Spiegel has worked for more than three decades in humanitarian health, global public health, epidemiology, migration, and forced displacement. His career integrates operational field experience, academic research, and policy leadership across the United Nations system, the United States Centers for Disease Control and Prevention, international medical organisations, and academic institutions.

=== Early humanitarian work ===
Spiegel began his humanitarian career as a medical coordinator with Médecins Sans Frontières and Médecins du Monde. He worked in refugee and conflict affected settings in Kenya in 1992 and in the Democratic Republic of the Congo in 1995. His work focused on emergency medical care, epidemic response, nutritional crises, and the breakdown of health systems during conflict.

=== Centers for Disease Control and Prevention ===
After completing his public health training, Spiegel joined the International Emergency and Refugee Health Branch at the United States Centers for Disease Control and Prevention as a Medical Epidemiologist. At the Centers for Disease Control and Prevention he carried out epidemic investigations, mortality surveys, and health assessments in humanitarian settings, working with host governments, the United Nations, and international organisations.

His work advanced epidemiological methods in emergencies and contributed to improved approaches for population mortality estimation, nutritional surveillance, and evidence based response strategies.

=== United Nations High Commissioner for Refugees ===
Spiegel later joined the United Nations High Commissioner for Refugees in Geneva, where he served for more than a decade in senior leadership roles. As Chief of Public Health and HIV he led global strategies on refugee health, HIV prevention and treatment, communicable disease control, and epidemic preparedness across multiple regions.

He was subsequently appointed Deputy Director of Programme Support and Management, where he oversaw public health, cash assistance, shelter and settlements, livelihoods, and solutions planning. His work shaped operational guidance for millions of displaced people.

During his tenure he co-authored key analyses of global displacement trends and humanitarian needs, including the influential UNHCR report on the State of the World's Refugees. His research documented mortality in refugee settings and informed reforms in humanitarian financing, accountability mechanisms, and evidence use.

=== Johns Hopkins Center for Humanitarian Health ===
In 2016, Spiegel was appointed Director of the Johns Hopkins Center for Humanitarian Health and Distinguished Professor of the Practice in the Department of International Health at the Johns Hopkins Bloomberg School of Public Health. The Center conducts research, graduate training, and policy engagement across conflict, migration, climate change, infectious diseases, and fragile health systems.

Spiegel's research portfolio includes assessments and evaluations of humanitarian emergencies, analysis of mortality and morbidity in crisis settings, and field evaluations of emergency health interventions. He has led studies on infectious disease outbreaks among displaced populations, including epidemic preparedness, surveillance methods, and outbreak response in conflict and disaster settings.

His work also examines governance and coordination within the humanitarian system, focusing on performance of coordination structures, leadership effectiveness, financing mechanisms, and accountability to affected populations. He has contributed to analyses of humanitarian system performance and reforms aimed at improving operational effectiveness.

A further area of his research involves the intersection of climate change, conflict, and forced displacement. Spiegel leads projects modelling how climate-related shocks influence mobility, health outcomes, and humanitarian needs and assessing the adaptability of health systems in fragile environments.

Spiegel continues to deploy to humanitarian emergencies with United Nations agencies, most recently leading public health response efforts in Afghanistan, the Ukraine refugee crisis, and the war in Gaza. He works closely with the World Health Organization, UNHCR, and other partners to provide epidemiological analysis, operational guidance, and strategic support in acute emergencies.

His current projects include work in Mali, Iraq, the Sahel, the Middle East, and other conflict-affected regions. He has expanded the Center's efforts in predictive analytics, displacement modelling, and the use of large datasets for real-time decision support during crises.

=== Global health leadership and commissions ===
Spiegel is Chair of the CHH-Lancet Commission on Health, Conflict and Forced Displacement, a global initiative examining the determinants and consequences of conflict related displacement and proposing structural reforms.

He is also Co Chair of Lancet Migration, an interdisciplinary collaboration focused on improving evidence and policy on the health of migrants and displaced populations.

He has served on technical advisory groups for the World Health Organization, other UN agencies, and governments, providing expertise on emergency health systems, displacement, and research translation.

=== Research contributions ===
Spiegel has authored more than 150 peer-reviewed publications on humanitarian health, migration, forced displacement, mortality measurement, HIV in emergencies, and health systems in fragile settings. His work has been published in The Lancet, BMJ, PLOS Medicine, and Conflict and Health.

Key research contributions include:

- modelling displacement, conflict, climate change, and health outcomes
- evaluation of humanitarian system governance, performance, and reform
- mortality measurement and methods in crisis and displacement settings
- HIV, tuberculosis, and chronic disease management in conflict affected and displaced populations

His analyses have informed reforms related to cash assistance, primary health care delivery in displacement settings, humanitarian financing, and the use of evidence in global policy.

=== Public engagement and policy influence ===
Spiegel is a frequent commentator on global displacement, conflict, humanitarian crises, and public health, and his analyses regularly appear in international media. He is featured in interviews, expert panels, and news commentary across major outlets including BBC News, Al Jazeera, NPR, The Guardian, The Washington Post, Foreign Affairs, and France24.

==== Media commentary and live interviews ====
In a 2025 live interview with France24, he analysed the implications of restrictions on United States foreign assistance and their effects on humanitarian operations, global stability, and the international aid system.

He has also provided commentary on the health and humanitarian consequences of the war in Gaza, including risks to civilians, attacks on health facilities, and disruptions to medical supply chains.

During the Afghanistan crisis he was interviewed by BBC News about public health threats resulting from the collapse of basic services and the challenges in delivering international assistance.

He has spoken on National Public Radio (NPR) regarding the displacement of Ukrainian refugees, the strain on European host countries, and the importance of sustained humanitarian financing.

==== Op-eds and policy commentaries ====
Spiegel has authored and contributed to policy commentaries in major international newspapers and magazines, focusing on humanitarian reform, donor responsibility, and the protection of displaced populations.

His analyses of global refugee governance and donor accountability have appeared in The Guardian and The Washington Post.

He has contributed expert insight to policy analysis pieces in Foreign Affairs examining humanitarian access constraints, the political economy of displacement, and global health security risks in fragile settings.

==== Advisory roles to governments and multilateral agencies ====
Spiegel regularly advises governments, multilateral institutions, and international organisations on humanitarian policy and crisis response. He provides technical and strategic support on health system resilience, emergency coordination, and protection of displaced populations.

He has participated in high level briefings for the United Nations, the World Health Organization, and donor governments including the United States, the United Kingdom, and the European Union.

He contributes to technical consultations on humanitarian financing, operational leadership, global health security, and the use of data for emergency preparedness and response. His input is sought widely for reform initiatives intended to improve the accountability and effectiveness of the international humanitarian system.

Spiegel's work in public engagement and policy influence contributes to debates on the future of humanitarian action, global governance, migration policy, and health intervention strategies in complex emergencies.

=== Awards and recognition ===
Spiegel has received recognition for contributions to humanitarian health, epidemiology, and global public health. He has served on editorial boards including Conflict and Health and the Journal on Migration and Human Security.

He has contributed to major international commissions, including the Lancet Commission on Syria and the broader Lancet Commission on Migration and Health. He also served as inaugural Chair of the Funding Committee for Research for Health in Humanitarian Crises.

=== Top 10 most cited publications ===
The following publications rank among Spiegel's most cited peer reviewed articles across global citation databases:

1. Spiegel PB, Checchi F, Colombo S, Paik E. Health-care needs of people affected by conflict: future trends and changing frameworks. The Lancet. 2010;375(9711):341–345. doi:10.1016/S0140-6736(09)61873-1.

2. Spiegel PB, Le P, Ververs M, et al. Detection of excess mortality in humanitarian emergencies: a systematic review. The Lancet. 2007;369(9558):2079–2086. doi:10.1016/S0140-6736(07)60967-5.

3. Abubakar I, Aldridge RW, Devakumar D, et al. The UCL–Lancet Commission on Migration and Health: the health of a world on the move. The Lancet. 2018;392(10164):2606–2654. doi:10.1016/S0140-6736(18)32114-7.

4. Spiegel PB, Bennedsen AR, Claass J, et al. Prevalence of HIV infection in conflict affected and displaced people in seven sub-Saharan African countries: a systematic review. The Lancet. 2007;369(9580):2187–2195. doi:10.1016/S0140-6736(07)61015-4.

5. Spiegel PB, Checchi F. Reassessing mortality in humanitarian settings. PLOS Medicine. 2010;7(6):e1000361. doi:10.1371/journal.pmed.1000361.

6. Spiegel PB. The humanitarian system is not just broke, but broken. The Lancet. 2017. doi:10.1016/S0140-6763(17)31278-3.

7. Spiegel PB, Salama P, et al. War and mortality in Kosovo, 1998–99: an epidemiological testimony. The Lancet. 2000;355(9222):2204–2209. doi:10.1016/S0140-6736(00)02404-1.

8. Spiegel PB. Public health in complex emergencies: unmet needs and future challenges. The Lancet. 2010;376(9736):1196–1197. doi:10.1016/S0140-6736(10)61841-4.

9. Spiegel PB, Khalifa A, Mateen F. Cancer in refugees in Jordan and Syria, 2009–12: challenges and the way forward in humanitarian emergencies. Lancet Oncology. 2014;15(7):e290–e297. doi:10.1016/S1470-2045(14)70067-X.

10. Spiegel PB. The humanitarian system needs reform. BMJ. 2017;358:j4210. doi:10.1136/bmj.j4210.

== Personal life ==
Spiegel is married to Mija Ververs, a public health and humanitarian expert who has worked extensively with international organisations on nutrition and emergency response. They have one daughter.

Spiegel has lived and worked for extended periods in Africa, the Middle East, Asia, Europe, and North America. He currently resides in Baltimore, Maryland.

Throughout his career he has maintained a strong personal interest in global health education, field-based training, and mentoring early career humanitarian professionals. Outside of his professional work, Spiegel is engaged in outdoor activities and travel.
