= Michael Spagat =

American-British economist

- Born: c. 1960 (age 65–66); United States

Academic background
- Education: Northwestern University (BA); Harvard University (PhD)
- Thesis: Supply Disruptions in Centrally Planned Economies

Academic work
- Discipline: Economist
- Institutions: Royal Holloway, University of London; Brown University; University of Illinois
- Website: mikespagat.wordpress.com

Michael Spagat (born c. 1960) is an American–British economist and researcher of war and armed conflict. He is currently a professor of economics at Royal Holloway, University of London. He is also the chair of the board at Every Casualty Counts, and is on the advisory panel of Action on Armed Violence.

== Biography ==
At Northwestern University, Spagat had obtained a BA in mathematical methods in the social sciences and economics in 1982. He was awarded a PhD in economics at Harvard University in 1988. He had held two positions as assistant professor of economics, one at University of Illinois from August 1987 to July 1990, and another at Brown University from July 1990 to August 1997, before joining Royal Holloway, University of London in September 1997. He is currently a professor of economics at Royal Holloway, University of London.

== Research ==
His current research addresses armed conflict, universal patterns in modern war, fabrication in survey research, the Dirty War Index civilian casualties in the Iraq War and problems in the measurement of war deaths in the Iraq War and the Gaza war.

=== Selected works ===
- Bohorquez, Juan Camilo; Gourley, Sean; Dixon, Alexander R.; Spagat, Michael; Johnson, Neil F. (December 17, 2009). "Common ecology quantifies human insurgency" (PDF). Nature. 462 (7275): 911–914. Bibcode:2009Natur.462..911B. doi:10.1038/nature08631. PMID 20016600.
- Overland, Jody; Simons, Kenneth L.; Spagat, Michael (2005). "Political instability and growth in dictatorships" (PDF). Public Choice. 125 (3). Kluwer Academic Publishers: 445–470. doi:10.1007/s11127-005-3060-0.
- Restrepo, Jorge A.; Spagat, Michael; Vargas, Juan F. "The dynamics of the Colombian civil conflict: A new data set" (PDF). Centre for Economic Policy Research. SSRN 480247.
- Spagat, Michael; Mack, Andrew; Cooper, Tara; Kreutz, Joakim (2009). "Estimating war deaths: An arena of contestation". Journal of Conflict Resolution. 53 (6): 934–950. doi:10.1177/0022002709346253.
- Jewell, Nicholas P.; Spagat, Michael; Jewell, Britta L. (2018). "Accounting for civilian casualties: From the past to the future" (PDF). Social Science History. 42 (3): 379–410. doi:10.1017/ssh.2018.9.
- Spagat, Michael; van Weezel, Stijn. "The decline of war since 1950: New evidence" (PDF). Lewis Fry Richardson: His Intellectual Legacy and Influence in the Social Sciences. Springer International Publishing: 129.
- Hsiao-Rei Hicks, Madelyn; Dardagan, Hamit; Guerrero Serdán, Gabriela; Bagnall, Peter M.; Sloboda, John A.; Spagat, Michael (2009). "The weapons that kill civilians—deaths of children and noncombatants in Iraq, 2003–2008". New England Journal of Medicine. 360 (16): 1585–1588. doi:10.1056/NEJMp0807240. PMID 19369663.
- Hsiao-Rei Hicks, Madelyn; Dardagan, Hamit; Guerrero Serdán, Gabriela; Bagnall, Peter M.; Sloboda, John A.; Spagat, Michael (2011). "Violent deaths of Iraqi civilians, 2003–2008: analysis by perpetrator, weapon, time, and location". PLOS Medicine. 8 (2) e1000415. Public Library of Science. doi:10.1371/journal.pmed.1000415. PMC 3039690. PMID 21358813.
