= Action on Armed Violence =

British non-profit non-governmental organization

Action on Armed Violence (AOAV)
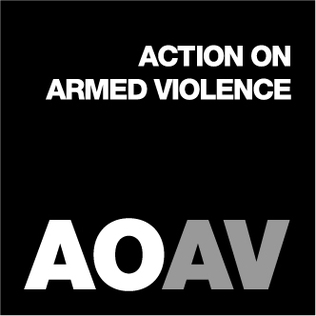
- Type: Non-profit NGO
- Purpose: Human rights, activism
- Headquarters: London, United Kingdom
- Product: nonprofit human rights advocacy
- Key people: Iain Overton
- Website: aoav.org.uk

Action on Armed Violence (AOAV) is a London-based non-governmental organization conducting research and advocacy on the incidence and impact of global armed violence.

Iain Overton, an investigative journalist and author, is the Executive Director of the organisation.

AOAV's research and advocacy work is focused on global armed violence, with a specialisation in explosive weapons. One of the charity's core functions is its Explosive Violence Monitor. This monitor has been cited by organisations such as Reuters, The Guardian, Al Jazeera, Human Rights Watch, and the United Nations.

== Conflict casualty data ==
In December 2020, AOAV's data was reported in The Guardian as showing that British soldiers were 12% more likely to have been killed than their American counterparts during the war on terror in Iraq and Afghanistan, according to a study of casualty figures. The research – intended as a lessons learned exercise – also concluded that UK forces were 26% more likely to have been killed by improvised explosives, validating longstanding complaints about the poorly armoured Snatch Land Rover.

In May 2021, AOAV's explosive violence data was also reported in The Guardian as showing that "Civilians accounted for 91% of those killed or injured by explosive weapons in populated areas worldwide over the last 10 years – a total of 238,892 people – according to a study of thousands of incidents."

In February 2026, The Guardian reported AOAV data showing that civilian casualties from explosive violence in Ukraine had risen by 26% in 2025. AOAV recorded 2,248 civilians killed and 12,493 injured during the year, based on English-language reports of explosive-violence incidents. The organisation also found that the average number of civilians killed or injured per incident had increased by 33% compared with 2024, to 4.8 casualties per strike. AOAV identified a Russian missile attack on Dnipro on 24 June 2025, which killed 21 people and injured 314, as the deadliest incident in its dataset that year.

The same research recorded 45,358 civilian casualties from explosive weapons worldwide in 2025, comprising 17,589 people killed and 27,769 injured. This represented a 26% fall from 2024. AOAV attributed 35% of the recorded civilian casualties to Israeli military action and 32% to Russian military action, with Sudan and Myanmar among the other countries recording high levels of civilian harm.

== Recording civilian harm ==
In March 2019, AOAV was reported by the BBC as finding out that the RAF killed or injured 4,315 enemy fighters in Iraq and Syria between September 2014 and January 2019. Of those harmed, 4,013, or 93%, were killed, and 302, or 7%, were injured. The UK's Ministry of Defence had said only one civilian was killed in the airstrikes, according to figures released to the charity. However AOAV expressed scepticism at such a low rate of civilian casualties.

In April 2021, AOAV was reported by The Independent as finding out that Black people are three times more likely to be killed on the streets of London than other ethnic groups. Almost half of all murder victims in the capital in 2019 were Black despite them making up only 13 per cent of the city’s population.

In May 2021, AOAV was reported by Al Jazeera as finding out that between 2016 and 2020, 40 percent of all civilian air strike casualties in Afghanistan were children. AOAV had reported that, of the 3,977 casualties caused over five years, 1,598 were children killed or wounded in attacks from the air. Civilian casualties resulting from air strikes by the Afghan Air Force during the first six months of 2020 had tripled compared to the same time period in 2019.

In August 2026, The Guardian reported research by AOAV examining unsolved homicides in London between 2015 and 2024. The study found that 110 of 1,222 homicides during the decade remained unsolved. For the period 2019 to 2023, minority ethnic people accounted for 61.7% of homicide victims but 92.9% of victims in unsolved cases. Black people accounted for about 40% of all homicide victims but 73% of victims in unsolved murders. The research also found that shootings were disproportionately represented among unsolved cases: although shootings accounted for 8.7% of London homicides between 2019 and 2023, they represented 38% of the 41 murders from that period which remained unsolved. The average age of victims in unsolved cases was 28, compared with about 36 for homicide victims overall.

== Monitoring the arms trade ==
In August 2016, The New York Times cited AOAV's research into 14 years’ worth of Pentagon contract information related to weapons supplied to American troops and for their partners and proxies. AOAV found the Pentagon provided more than 1.45 million firearms to various security forces in Afghanistan and Iraq, including more than 978,000 assault rifles, 266,000 pistols and almost 112,000 machine guns.

In January 2021, The Guardian cited AOAV's research on the UK government's approval of exports between January 2015 and June 2020 to countries listed by the Department for International Trade as 'subject to arms embargo, trade sanctions and other trade restrictions'. AOAV found that Britain had approved exports of military items to 80% of the destinations on the list. AOAV also found that UK export licences for small arms and ammunition have been approved to 31 destinations on the embargoed and restricted list, including assault rifles, pistols, sniper rifles and shotguns. Many of these sent to areas that have recently suffered from violent conflicts or state oppression, including Kenya, Hong Kong, Lebanon, Kyrgyzstan, Togo, Oman, Azerbaijan, Armenia and Pakistan.

== Military transparency and intelligence ==
In March 2025, Declassified UK published an investigation by AOAV into British surveillance flights around the Gaza Strip. Using flight-tracking data, AOAV found that the Royal Air Force had conducted at least 518 intelligence, surveillance and reconnaissance flights over or close to Gaza between 3 December 2023 and 27 March 2025. The flights were operated by 14 Squadron using Shadow R1 aircraft from RAF Akrotiri in Cyprus. AOAV reported that at least 303 flights took place under the government of Rishi Sunak and 215 under Keir Starmer.

== Media and military influence ==
In June 2026, The Canary reported on AOAV research examining the presentation of former senior military personnel as media commentators in the United Kingdom. AOAV reviewed the media appearances of 33 former senior military figures who had subsequently taken roles in defence, security, technology or intelligence companies. It found that 19 of them, or 58%, had on at least one occasion been presented in British media coverage primarily by reference to their former military rank or service without their current commercial or financial links to the defence sector being disclosed.
