= Gaza humanitarian crisis =

Ongoing humanitarian crisis

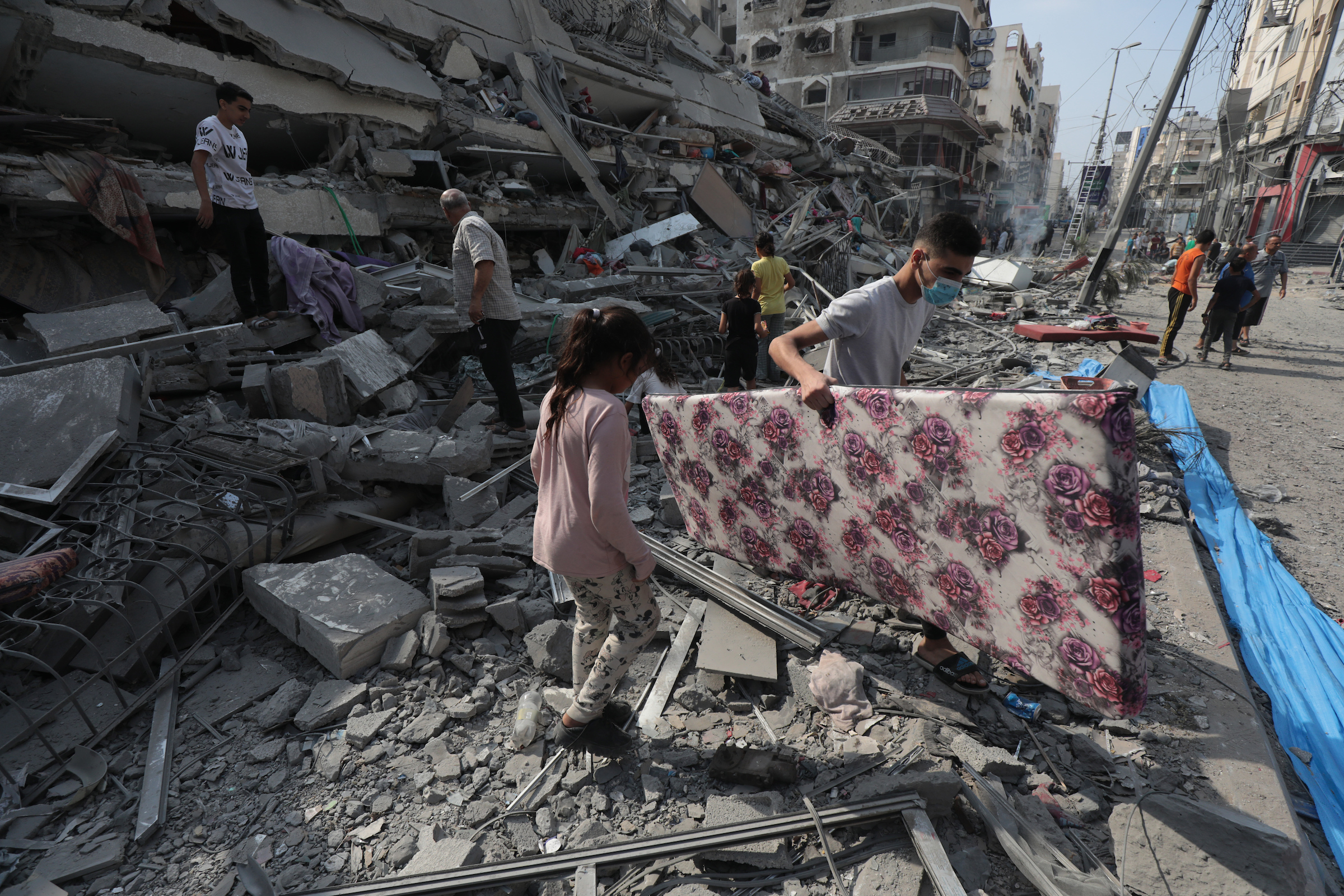
Residents inspect the ruins of an apartment destroyed by Israeli airstrikes.

The Gaza Strip is experiencing a humanitarian crisis as a result of the Gaza war and genocide. The crisis includes both an ongoing famine and a healthcare collapse. At the start of the war, Israel tightened its blockade on the Gaza Strip, which has resulted in significant shortages of fuel, food, medication, water, and essential medical supplies. This siege resulted in a 90% drop in electricity availability, impacting hospital power supplies, sewage plants, and shutting down the desalination plants that provide drinking water. Doctors warned of disease outbreaks spreading due to overcrowded hospitals. According to a United Nations special committee, Amnesty International, and other experts and human rights organisations, Israel has committed genocide against the Palestinian people during its ongoing invasion and bombing of the Gaza Strip.

Heavy bombardment by Israeli airstrikes caused catastrophic damage to Gaza’s infrastructure, further deepening the crisis. The Gaza Health Ministry reported over 4,000 children killed in the war's first month. UN Secretary General António Guterres stated Gaza had "become a graveyard for children." (Note: Israeli UN Ambassador Gilad Erdan responded directly to Guterres, stating, "Shame on [Guterres]... More than 30 minors – among them a 9-month-old baby as well as toddlers and children who witnessed their parents being murdered in cold blood – are being held against their will in the Gaza Strip. Hamas is the problem in Gaza, not Israel's actions to eliminate this terrorist organization.") In May 2024, the USAID head Samantha Power stated that conditions in Gaza were "worse than ever before".

Organizations such as Doctors Without Borders, the Red Cross, and a joint statement by UNICEF, the World Health Organization, the UN Development Programme, United Nations Population Fund, and World Food Programme have warned of a dire humanitarian collapse. In early March 2025, Israel began a complete blockade of all food and supplies going into Gaza, ending only in late May with limited distribution by the controversial Gaza Humanitarian Foundation. Since then, many aid-seekers have been killed or wounded while trying to obtain food.

As of August 2025, Integrated Food Security Phase Classification (IPC) projections show 100% of the population are experiencing "high levels of acute food insecurity", and 32% are projected to face Phase 5 catastrophic levels by September 30, 2025. On 22 August 2025, the IPC said that famine is taking place in one of the five governorates in the Gaza Strip: specifically, the Gaza Governorate which includes Gaza City. The IPC added that, within the next month, famine was likely to occur in the Deir al-Balah Governorate and Khan Yunis Governorate. The IPC had insufficient data on the North Gaza Governorate for a classification but concluded that conditions were likely similar or worse than in the Gaza Governorate. Within the next 6 weeks as of 16 August, the number of people in IPC Phase 5 is expected to rise from 500,000 to over 640,000.

== Food and water ==
=== Famine ===
The population of the Gaza Strip underwent a famine as a result of an Israeli blockade during the Gaza war between 22 August 2025 and 19 December 2025. The prevention of basic essentials and humanitarian aid from entering Gaza, as well as airstrikes that destroyed food infrastructure, such as bakeries, mills, and food stores, caused a widespread scarcity of essential supplies. (Note: According to B'Tselem, the famine risk is a direct outcome of Israeli policy: "This reality is not a byproduct of war, but a direct result of Israel's declared policy. Residents now depend entirely on food supplies from outside Gaza, as they can no longer produce almost any food themselves. Most cultivated fields have been destroyed, and accessing open areas during the war is dangerous in any case. Bakeries, factories and food warehouses have been bombed or shut down due to lack of basic supplies, fuel and electricity.") Humanitarian aid was also blocked by protests at borders and ports. Increasing societal breakdown in Gaza, including looting, was also cited as a barrier to the provision of aid.

By August 2025, Integrated Food Security Phase Classification (IPC) projections showed that 100% of the population are experiencing "high levels of acute food insecurity", and 32% were projected to face Phase 5 catastrophic levels by 30 September 2025. On 22 August 2025, the IPC said that famine is taking place in at least one of the five governorates in the Gaza Strip: specifically, the Gaza Governorate which includes Gaza City. The IPC added that, within the next month, famine was likely to also occur in both the Deir al-Balah Governorate and the Khan Yunis Governorate. The IPC had insufficient data on the North Gaza Governorate for a classification but concluded that conditions were likely similar or worse than in the Gaza Governorate. Within the next 6 weeks as of 16 August, the number of people in IPC Phase 5 was expected to rise from 500,000 to over 640,000.

On 22 October 2025, the International Court of Justice found that Israel is obliged to guarantee sufficient food to Gazans and to allow UNRWA to operate in Gaza. On 19 December, the IPC published a report declaring that there is no longer a famine in Gaza after improvements in food delivery following the ceasefire, but warned that the situation remains "highly fragile" with 100,000 still facing "catastrophic conditions", although that number was projected to decline to 1,900 by April 2026. As of January 2026, Gazans have received enough humanitarian aid to meet their basic food needs for the first time since the start of the war.

However, in late July 2026, the IPC reported that the scale-up of humanitarian assistance, enabled by the October 2025 ceasefire, has driven improvements in food security and nutrition conditions across Gaza, but that over 1.2 million people (59% of the population of Gaza) continued to face Phase 3 Crisis levels of food insecurity or worse, including 212,000 (about 10% of Gazans) experiencing Phase 4 Emergency levels, and warned that Gaza is still experiencing a severe food emergency that could develop into another famine.

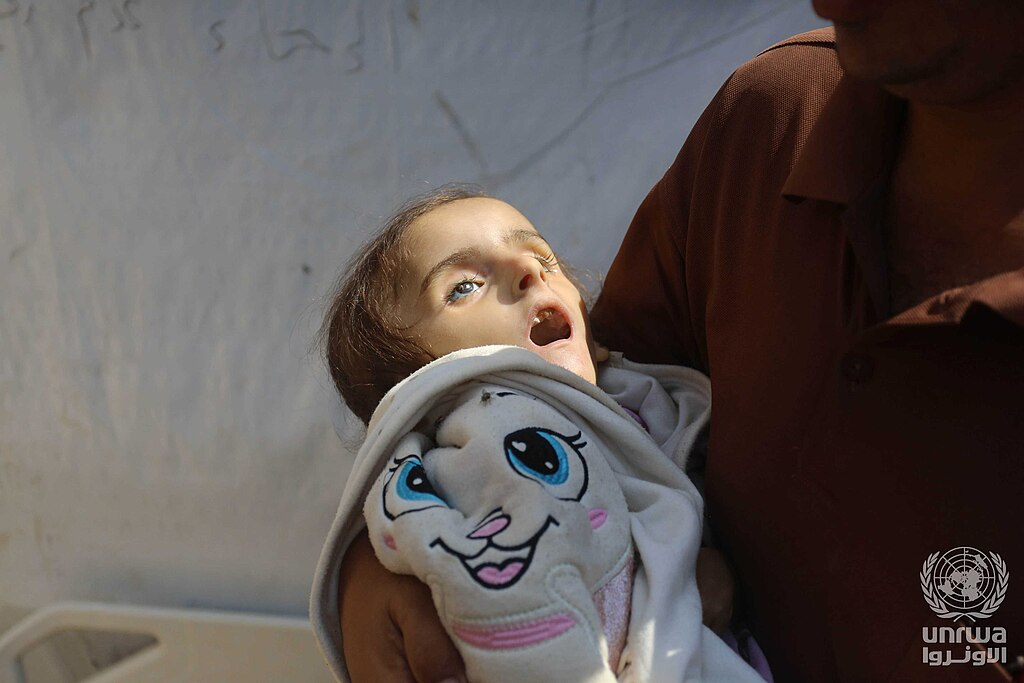
A 4-year-old Palestinian girl who died from malnutrition and lack of treatment due to the Gaza war

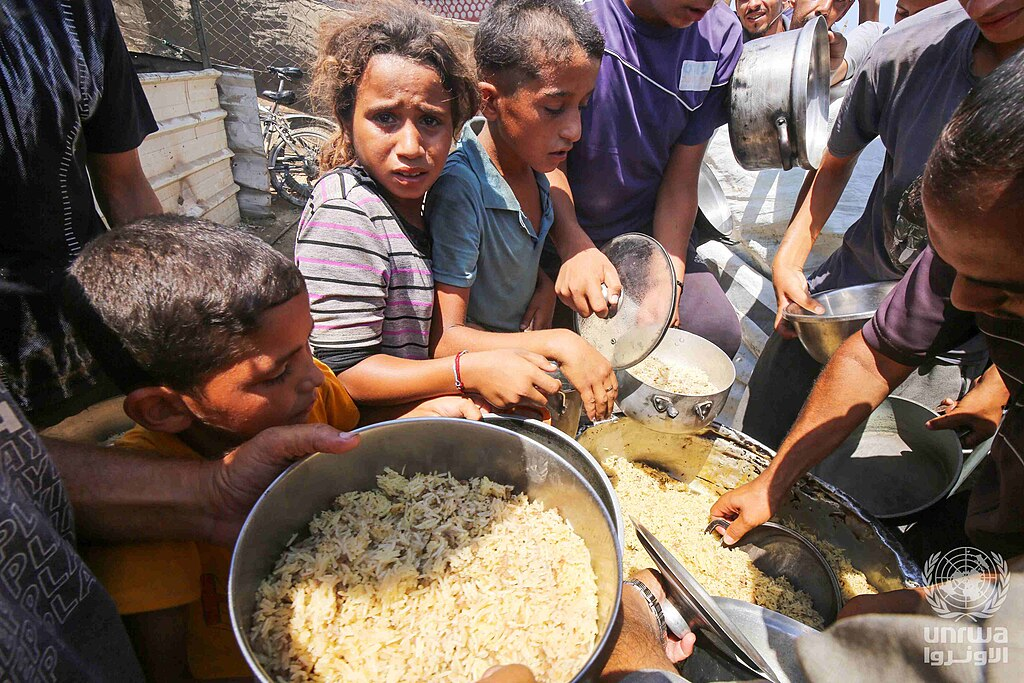
Displaced Palestinians in Deir el-Balah line up to receive food provided by charitable organizations.

External videos
- Emily "Cali" Callahan, an American nurse who worked in Gaza for Doctors Without Borders until early November, describes the humanitarian situation in Gaza to CNN's Anderson Cooper

The ceasefire between Israel and Hamas went into effect on 10 October 2025. Under the ceasefire terms, Israel was to permit up to 600 humanitarian aid trucks to enter Gaza each day. Since then, the limit has been reduced to 300, with Israeli officials attributing the change to delays in recovering the bodies of Israeli hostages believed to be buried beneath rubble from Israeli strikes. Data from the UN2720 Monitoring and Tracking Dashboard, which records the movement of humanitarian convoys entering Gaza, showed that between 10 and 16 October, only 216 trucks reached their intended destinations within Gaza.

=== Water supply ===
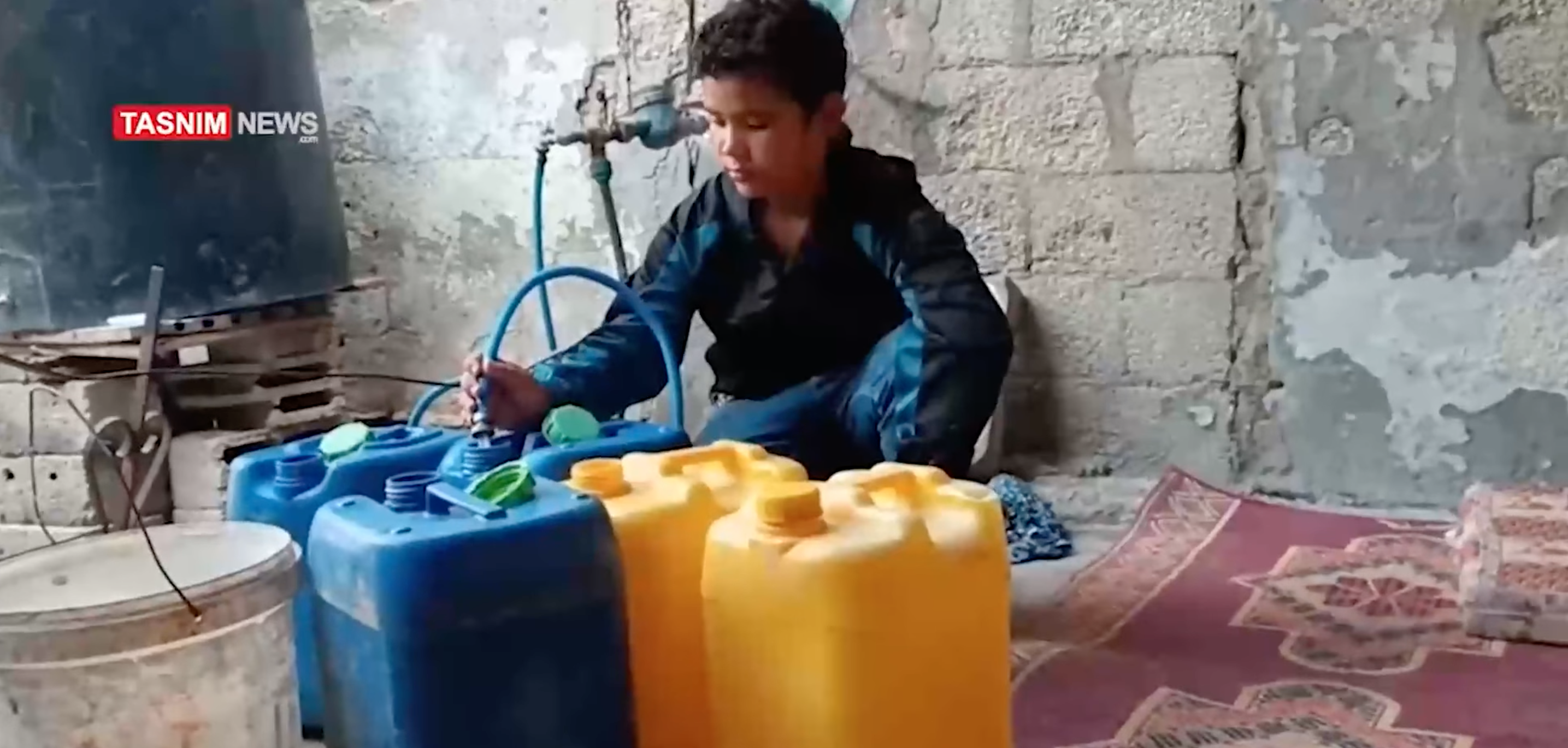
Boy filling a water container with a garden hose in late-October 2023

Before the war, Gaza purchased a small share of its water from Israel (6% in 2021). Israel's blockade of water pipelines exacerbated water supply issues in the Gaza Strip, which already had a near lack of fit-to-drink aquifers. On 12 October, the United Nations said that Israeli actions had caused water shortages affecting 650,000 people. On 14 October, UNRWA announced Gaza no longer had clean drinking water, and two million people were at risk of death.

On 16 October, Israel claimed to have provided water near southern Khan Younis, but the Gaza Interior Ministry denied this. By the same time, residents were drinking seawater and brackish water from farm wells, raising fears of waterborne diseases. Doctors and hospital staff drank IV solution. By 17 October, the UN stated Gaza's last seawater desalination plant had shut down. The Guardian stated fears were growing people had begun to die from dehydration. On 18 October, Israel announced it would not allow fuel to enter Gaza. The UNRWA stated fuel was needed to resume water pump operations. Some Gazans purchased water from private vendors who purified water with solar panels. On 19 October, the UN reported Gazans were surviving on a daily average of three liters of water each. The World Health Organization recommends a minimum of 50 to 100 liters per day. On 22 October, the UN stated Gazans had resorted to drinking dirty water.

In November 2023, the UN stated many still relied on "brackish or saline ground water," if they were drinking any water at all. On 6 November, OCHA stated continued water shortages were raising fears of dehydration. UNRWA announced on 15 November that due to the lack of fuel, 70 percent of Gaza would no longer have access to clean water. On 17 November, Oxfam stated Gaza's water supply was at seventeen percent of its pre-siege capacity. On 27 November, residents in northern Gaza received their first aid delivery of clean water since the war began.

Doctors Without Borders stated on 18 December 2023 the water system in Gaza had collapsed. UNICEF reported children in southern Gaza were receiving 1.5 liters of water a day, while the minimum amount for survival is 3 liters per day. As of December 6, the sole water desalination facility in northern Gaza was inoperative, while the pipeline that delivers water from Israel to the north remained shut, thereby heightening the likelihood of dehydration and waterborne illnesses due to the consumption of unsafe water sources. The impact on hospitals has been severe, as only one out of the 24 hospitals in northern Gaza is operational and capable of accepting new patients, albeit with limited services, as of December 14. On 13 December, Israel began pumping seawater into tunnels reportedly used by Hamas. Experts warned this would irreversibly damage Gaza's water aquifers and clearwater supply. The IDF acknowledged it was flooding the tunnels on 30 January.

In January 2024, the Israeli army destroyed Gaza City’s main reservoirs, Al-Balad and Al-Rimal. The director of ambulance and emergency centres for Gaza stated on 20 January that the "struggle for water is a daily torment". The UNOCHA director for Gaza stated, "We can only meet a third of the population’s need for clean drinking water."

In February 2024, the Food and Agriculture Organization stated water was at 7 percent of pre-October levels. In May 2024, the Coastal Municipalities Water Utility reported, "The entire water supply and sewage management systems are nearing total collapse because the damage is so extensive". UNOCHA stated some displaced people were surviving on 3 percent of minimum daily water needs. UNICEF made a deal with Israel in June 2024 to restore a desalination plant.

In July 2024, the Israeli military stated it had allowed power to be restored to a desalination plant in Gaza. Children in Al-Mawasi were waiting six to eight hours a day looking for water, with officials stating facilities serving as many as 700,000 people were out of service. By August 2024, UNRWA warned that Gaza's water crisis had grown more severe, with people only receiving about half of the required liters of water per day. Children were reported to be drinking from puddles due to the lack of available drinking water.

== Disease ==
=== Physical health and disease ===
Avatar of World Health Organization

World Health Organization
(@WHO)
tweeted:

As deaths and injuries in Gaza continue to rise due to intensified hostilities, intense overcrowding and disrupted health, water, and sanitation systems pose an added danger: the rapid spread of infectious diseases.

November 8, 2023

Public health experts warned of the outbreak and spread of disease in Gaza. According to Oxfam and the United Nations, Gaza's lack of clean water and sanitation would trigger a rise in cholera and other deadly infectious diseases. Oxfam stated Gaza's sewage pumping stations and wastewater treatment facilities had ceased operations, so the buildup of solid waste and unburied bodies were likely vectors of disease. Due to the lack of clean drinking water, Gaza residents were drinking water contaminated with sewage, seawater, and farm water, another major source of disease. Richard Brennan, regional emergency director at WHO, stated, "The conditions are ripe for the spread of a number of diarrhoeal and skin diseases".

Doctors also warned of overcrowded conditions at schools and hospitals. Dr. Nahed Abu Taaema stated overcrowded shelters were "a prime breeding ground for disease to spread". Abu Taaema reported a rise in rashes, lung infections, and stomach issues. On 24 October, the Gaza Health Ministry recorded 3,150 cases of disease from drinking contaminated water, mostly among children. The lack of medical supplies was another reported issue, as the World Health Organization reported a sanitation crisis in hospitals, with some struggling to sanitize surgical equipment. Dr. Iyad Issa Abu Zaher stated, "The outbreak of disease is inevitable". UNRWA schools, where an estimated 600,000 Gazans were sheltering, reported outbreaks of scabies and chicken pox, as well as a lack of basic hygiene for women menstruating. On 27 October, Action Against Hunger warned people were developing kidney failure due to the consumption of salt water and dehydration.

On 6 November, OCHA stated individuals with disabilities were suffering disproportionately due to the lack of accommodations in most shelters. UNRWA announced cases of respiratory infections, diarrhoea and chicken pox had been reported at its shelters. On 10 November, WHO stated infectious diseases, including diarrhea and chickenpox, were soaring across the Gaza Strip. OCHA stated accumulated waste in the streets risked the spread of airborne diseases and infestations of insects and rats. Doctors reported that due to a lack of fresh water and iodine, patients wounds were often infested with maggots.

Raw sewage overflowed in the streets, creating a health and environmental disaster. On 8 November, the World Health Organization stated that since the start of the conflict, 33,551 cases of diarrhea had been reported, 8,944 cases of scabies and lice, 1,005 cases of chickenpox, 12,635 cases of skin rash and 54,866 cases of upper respiratory infections. On 17 November, WHO updated these numbers, stating there were 70,000 cases of acute respiratory infections and over 44,000 cases of diarrhea, which were significantly higher than expected. UNICEF warned the worsening sanitation situation threatened a mass disease outbreak.

On 28 November, WHO stated more Palestinians risked dying from disease than bombings. UNRWA chief Philippe Lazzarini warned of an impending humanitarian "tsunami" as people succumbed to disease and the deprivation of sanitation and clean water. A Hepatitis A outbreak was reported by the United Nations on 3 December. The UN reported disease outbreaks in southern Gaza shelters. Volker Türk warned of unsanitary conditions amidst mass displacement in southern Gaza. On 7 December, the World Health Organization reported increases in acute respiratory infections, scabies, jaundice, and diarrhea. On 13 December, 360,000 cases of infectious diseases were reported in shelters. On 20 December, WHO reported Gaza was experiencing "soaring rates of infectious disease outbreaks".

On 29 December, WHO chief Tedros Adhanom Ghebreyesus reported 180,000 cases of upper respiratory infections, 136,400 cases of diarrhoea, 55,400 cases of lice and scabies, 5,330 cases of chickenpox, 42,700 cases of skin rash, and 4,722 cases of impetigo. Flooding in Gaza spread sewage water, raising fears of the spread of disease. On 19 January, Yahya Al-Sarraj, the mayor of Gaza City, stated more than 50,000 tons of trash had accumulated in the city, further leading to the spread of disease. Parents reported children falling sick after being exposed to raw sewage.

In his address to the UN Security Council on 31 January 2024, Martin Griffiths, the UN under-secretary general for humanitarian affairs and emergency relief coordination, provided a comprehensive overview of the challenges currently confronting numerous individuals in Gaza. According to our latest estimates, approximately 75 percent of the entire population has been displaced. The living conditions they endure are deplorable and deteriorating with each passing day. The makeshift tent camps, established by refugees and displaced people, are being inundated by heavy rains, compelling children, parents, and the elderly to seek shelter in the mud. The issue of food insecurity continues to escalate, while access to clean water remains almost entirely unattainable. Given the limited availability of public health support, preventable diseases are rampant and will persistently propagate. On 4 March, the Gaza Health Ministry stated they had recorded about one million cases of infectious diseases.

The situation in Gaza is worsening, leading to the spread of diseases due to the lack of clean water and insufficient sewage facilities. According to the United Nations, the people in Gaza are facing a shortage of water and hygiene materials, which is negatively impacting their overall well-being and physical health. Additionally, the accumulation of solid waste in public areas, hospitals, IDP shelters, and other locations is a major concern as it poses significant risks to public health. The uncollected waste, amounting to tens of thousands of tons, is exacerbating these risks. In April 2024, the Gaza Media Office stated environmental contamination in northern Gaza had reached "unprecedented levels" due to "mountains of waste and hundreds of mass graves". In May 2024, the UN stated, "Mosquitoes, flies and rats are spreading, and so are diseases." Oxfam reported the threat of disease outbreaks due to an accumulation of "human waste and rivers of sewage in the streets".

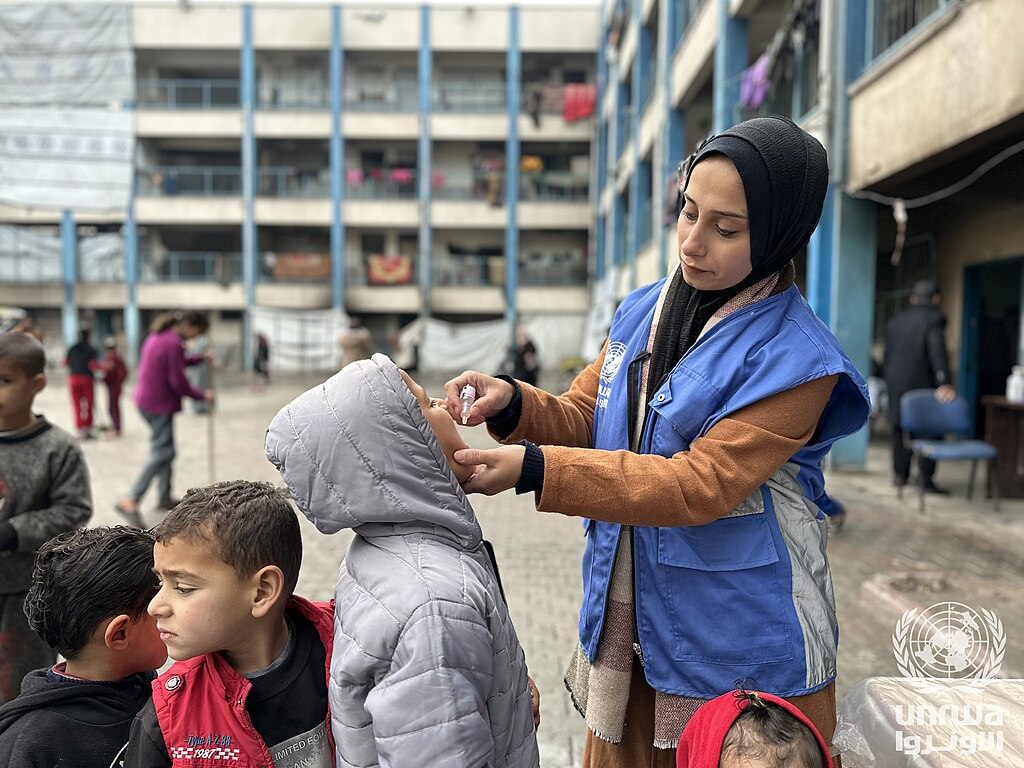
Polio vaccines being administered at an UNRWA shelter in Al-Shati refugee camp, the Gaza Strip, on 22 February 2025

In July 2024, poliovirus was detected in Gaza's sewage water. On 29 July, The Gaza Health Ministry officially declared a polio epidemic in the Gaza Strip.

According to a letter sent to President Joseph R. Biden, Vice President Kamala D. Harris, and others on October 2, 2024 by 99 American healthcare workers who have served in the Gaza Strip since October 7, 2023, and cited in a study from the Watson Institute for International and Public Affairs at Brown University, at least 5,000 people in Gaza have died due to a lack of access to care for chronic diseases according to a conservative estimate.

=== Psychological health ===
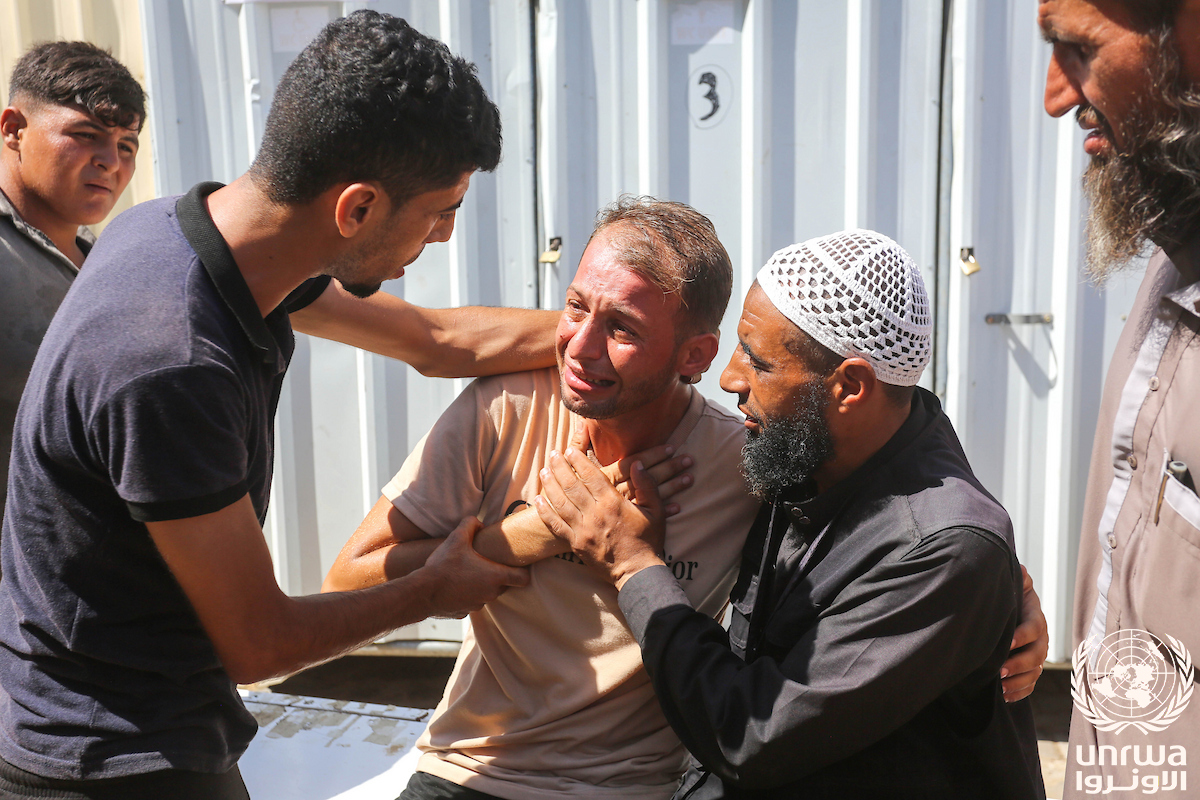
Displacement, loss, and violence brought about by the war have contributed to worsening mental health amongst Palestinians in Gaza.

Weeks of continuous air strikes and explosions have contributed to the psychological destruction of children in Gaza. Following 16 days of bombardment, children developed severe trauma, with symptoms including convulsion, aggression, bed-wetting, and nervousness. 90% of children in pediatric hospitals in Gaza exhibited or reported symptoms of anxiety, the majority exhibited post-traumatic stress symptoms, and 82% reported fears of imminent death. On 6 November, UNICEF spokesman Toby Fricker warned of the psychological impacts and "massive stress" experienced by children in Gaza. On 17 November, WHO chief Tedros Adhanom Ghebreyesus stated 20,000 people were in need of specialized mental health services. On 9 January 2024, OCHA reported 485,000 people with mental health issues were experiencing care disruption.

== Healthcare ==
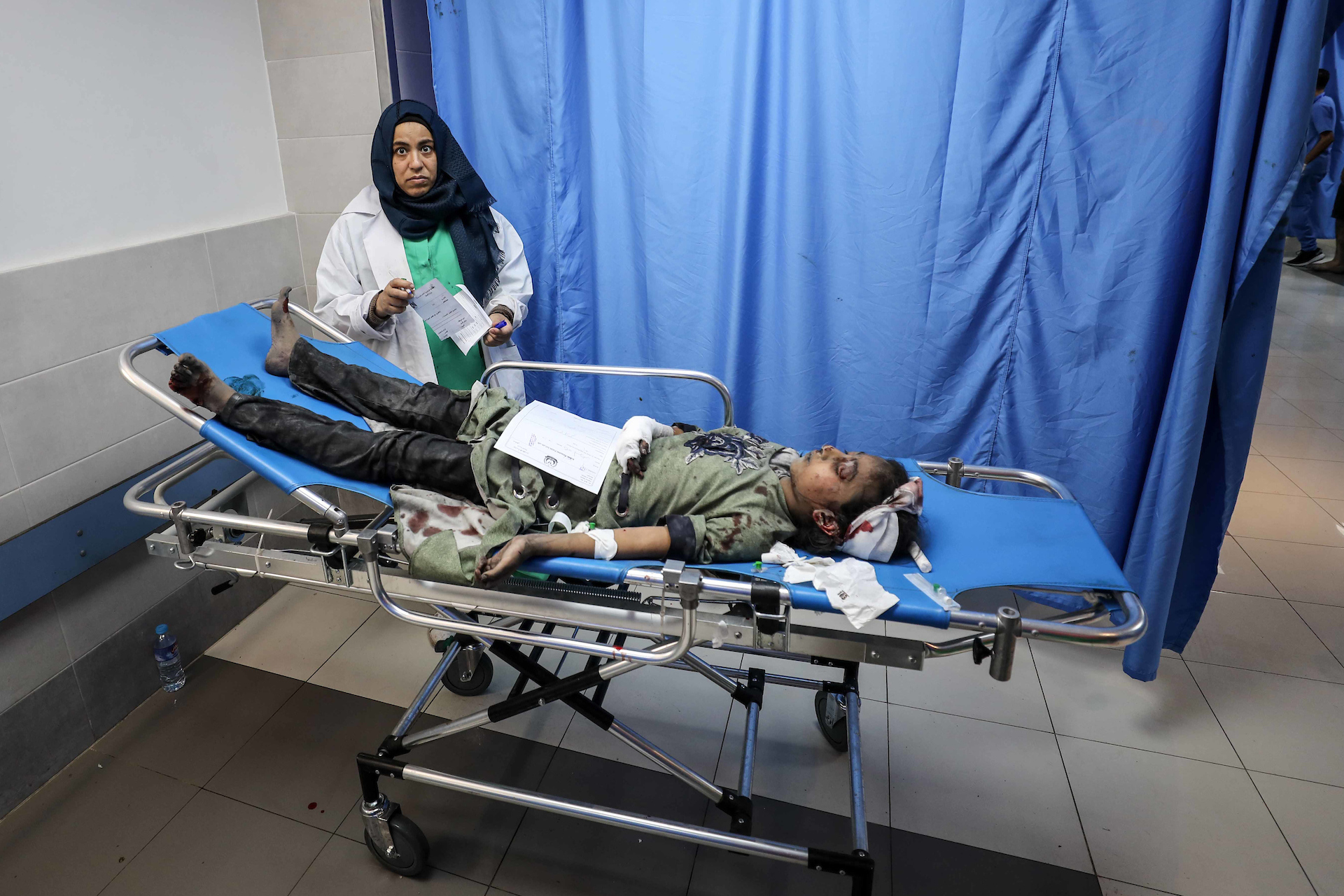
Doctor with wounded child, Al-Shifa

The healthcare system of Gaza faced several humanitarian crises as a result of the conflict. Due to Israel's siege, hospitals faced a lack of fuel and relied on backup generators for the first two weeks of the war. By 23 October, Gaza hospitals began shutting down as they ran out of fuel, starting with the Indonesia Hospital. When hospitals lost power completely, multiple premature babies in NICUs died. Numerous medical staffers were killed by Israeli airstrikes, and ambulances, health institutions, medical headquarters, and multiple hospitals were destroyed. The Medecins Sans Frontieres said scores of ambulances and medical facilities were damaged or destroyed. By late-October, the Gaza Health Ministry stated the healthcare system had "totally collapsed".

By 5 January 2024, the World Health Organization reported there had been 304 attacks on healthcare facilities in Gaza since 7 October, with 606 deaths. On 24 January, WHO stated seven out of 24 hospitals remained partially operational in Northern Gaza, and seven out of 12 in Southern Gaza. On 26 January, a senior OHCHR official stated, "I fear that many more civilians will die. The continued attacks on specially protected facilities, such as hospitals, will kill civilians". The same day, a Doctors Without Borders coordinator stated, "There is no longer a healthcare system in Gaza." A senior technical adviser with the International Rescue Committee stated, "There’s nothing that could have prepared me for the horrors that I saw." In May 2024, the UN Development Programme stated the conflict could reduce levels of health back to 1980 levels.

=== Supplies shortages ===
Following the shutdown of the Gaza Strip power station on 11 October, it was reported that hospitals in Gaza would soon run out of available fuel to power generators. The Al-Aqsa Martyrs Hospital faced a dialysis crisis, with hundreds sharing only 24 dialysis machines. WHO announced it could no longer resupply al-Shifa and al-Quds hospitals due to the high levels of risk. In November, nearly half of all hospitals were out of service due to shortages of fuel and power, and amputations and C-sections were performed without anesthetic due to shortages of supplies.

On 8 November, Al-Quds completely ran out of fuel and shut down most services. On 13 November, Kamal Adwan Hospital ran out of fuel. The al-Amal Hospital's only generator shut down.

On 6 December, Doctors Without Borders stated fuel and medical supplies at al-Aqsa hospital were critically low. Doctors at Nasser Medical Complex in Khan Younis described a lack of supplies and barely any medical functionality.

From 11 October 2023 onwards, the Gaza Strip has experienced a complete lack of electricity due to the Israeli authorities discontinuing the power supply and depleting the fuel reserves for Gaza's only power plant. The United Nations has observed that this ongoing blackout, along with the shutdown of communications and industrial fuel, is greatly impeding the aid community's ability to assess and effectively address the worsening humanitarian crisis.

=== Attacks and destruction ===
Doctors Without Borders
(@MSF_canada)
tweeted:

"We're on the fourth floor, there's a sniper who attacked four patients inside the hospital. One of them has a gunshot wound directly in his neck, and he is a quadriplegic [patient], and the other one [was shot] in the abdomen."

November 11, 2023

On 14 October, the Diagnostic Cancer Treatment Centre of the Al-Ahli Arab Hospital was partially destroyed by Israeli rocket fire. In a statement on 15 October, the World Health Organization stated four hospitals were no longer functioning after being targeted by Israeli airstrikes. On 17 October, a widely condemned explosion in the al-Ahli courtyard resulted in significant fatalities.

On 30 October, the Turkish-Palestinian Friendship Hospital was severely damaged by an Israeli airstrike. On 9 November, the Gaza government media office stated Israel had bombed eight hospitals in the past three days.

Israeli tanks surrounded four hospitals, al-Rantisi Hospital, al-Nasr Hospital, and the eye and mental health hospitals, from all directions. The Nasser Rantissi paediatric cancer hospital caught on fire after being hit by an Israeli airstrike and began evacuations. At least three hospitals were hit by Israeli airstrikes, leading the director of the Al-Shifa hospital to state, "Israel is now launching a war on Gaza City hospitals." The strikes resulted in multiple casualties. The Palestinian Red Crescent claimed Israeli snipers opened fire on children at al-Quds hospital, killing one and wounding 28.

On 20 November, Israel launched an offensive on Indonesia Hospital with an airstrike that reportedly killed 12 people. Following the strike, Israeli tanks surrounded the hospital. Staff at the hospital reported Israeli soldiers shooting inside the hospital indiscriminately. (Note: Many were sheltering at the hospital, as it was the last functioning one in northern Gaza. The Gaza Ministry of Health stated 200 patients were evacuated from the hospital, while an estimated 500 patients remained.) Four doctors were reported killed after Israel bombed al-Awda Hospital on 22 November. The Kamal Adwan hospital stated Israeli bombings increased around the hospital.

On 25 November, the director general of the Ministry of Health stated the Israeli military shot at medical teams during the temporary ceasefire in effect. The director of the European Hospital stated its paramedics had been wounded in Israeli airstrikes. On 11 December, MSF stated one of its doctors inside Al Awda Hospital had been injured by an Israeli sniper.

By 18 January 2024, none of Gaza's hospitals remained fully operational. On 19 January 2024, the Jordanian government reported that the Israeli military had deliberately targeted its new field hospital in Khan Younis, using a tank to block the hospital entrance and shooting at the hospital and bunker shelters. On 24 January, the World Health Organization stated it had recorded a total of 660 Israeli attacks on healthcare facilities.

According to United Nations Secretary-General António Guterres, the hostilities in Gaza and Israel have “created appalling human suffering, physical destruction and collective trauma across Israel and the Occupied Palestinian Territory”.

==== Al-Shifa Hospital ====
In early November, Al-Shifa Hospital in Gaza experienced a surge in Israeli attacks, with the facility being bombed five times in 24 hours. Families attempting to leave the complex were reportedly shot and killed. (Note: Ashraf al-Qudra, a doctor at al-Shifa, stated the hospital was completely out of service, as the Israeli army shot "everything that moves.")

Physicians for Human Rights documented the deaths of two premature babies at Al-Shifa due to electricity shortages. IDF spokesperson Daniel Hagari pledged assistance in evacuating babies, but the Gaza Health Ministry asserted a lack of provided mechanisms. On November 12, the hospital's director-general stated that 650 patients at Al-Shifa were in danger due to the catastrophic situation, including the destruction of the cardiac ward.

Doctors Without Borders reported dire conditions at Al-Shifa Hospital, citing a lack of essentials like food, water, and electricity, with reports of a sniper targeting patients. Israel's raid on the hospital on 15 November was described as an unimaginable nightmare. (Note: Three dozen premature babies, were still sheltering at the time of the raid. Doctors reported 40 patients at al-Shifa died.) Witnesses stated that Israel did not provide aid or supplies. The hospital faced challenges, including decomposing bodies and maggot-infested wounds, due to a lack of essential resources.

Amid deteriorating conditions, an evacuation of Al-Shifa began on November 18. (Note: Robert Mardini, director general of the Red Cross, described the situation at al-Shifa as "unbearably desperate.") Ismail al-Thawabta, a Palestinian media office spokesperson, asserted that patients moved to other facilities faced a perilous fate. ActionAid characterized the evacuation as a death sentence. Concerns were raised about the adequacy of aid. The World Health Organization and the Palestinian Red Crescent participated in evacuation plans, aiming to transfer patients to alternative medical facilities.

The hospital stated six doctors would remain behind with 120 patients too sick to be transferred. A humanitarian team from the World Health Organization visited al-Shifa and found a lack of food, water, or medicine, with signs of gunfire and a mass grave. The director of al-Shifa said people were only given one hour to evacuate, stating, "we were forced to leave at gunpoint." WHO stated 25 health workers and 291 patients, including 32 babies remained at al-Shifa.

On 19 November, the premature babies at al-Shifa were evacuated to southern Gaza, where they were planned to be moved to Egypt the following day. The World Health Organization stated it was planning missions to transport the remaining al-Shifa patients to Nasser Medical Complex and European Gaza Hospital in the next 2–3 days.

Staff at Al-Shifa stated 50 patients, including infants, had died due to power and oxygen shortages. The director of Al-Shifa stated Israel's claim to provide incubators to premature babies was false. On 22 November, the Palestinian Red Crescent stated fourteen ambulances had arrived at al-Shifa to evacuate the hospital's remaining patients.

On 26 November, the conditions for remaining patients at al-Shifa were reportedly dire. On 27 November, the Ministry of Health reported a volunteer effort at al-Shifa hospital sought to restart the dialysis department. By 28 November, the dialysis unit was reportedly reopened and receiving patients. On 7 December, the Gaza Health Ministry stated only basic first aid was being delivered at Al-Shifa Hospital.

==== Kamal Adwan Hospital ====
On 3 December, the IDF bombed the Kamal Adwan hospital, killing at least four people. Attacks in the vicinity of Kamal Adwan hospital were reported on 5 December. The director of Kamal Adwan Hospital stated Israel had killed two mothers and their newborn babies when Israel targeted its maternity ward. The UN confirmed the killings. Israel raided the Kamal Adwan Hospital. In response, Tedros Adhanom Ghebreyesus stated WHO was extremely worried for Kamal Adwan's medical staff.

==== Al-Aqsa Hospital ====
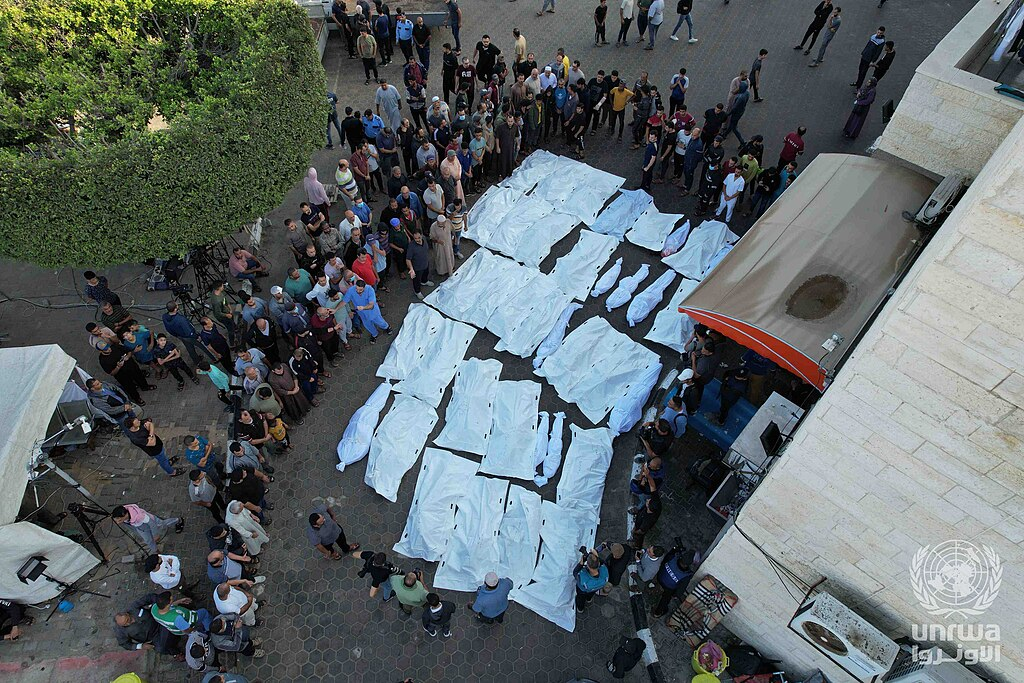
Relatives of Palestinians who died in Israeli airstrikes gathering around the bodies taken from the morgue of Al-Aqsa hospital in Deir el-Balah

Beginning on 6 January, doctors at Shuhada al-Aqsa Hospital reported that Israeli fire was nearing the hospital. Tens of thousands of people were reported to be sheltering at the hospital. British doctor Nick Maynard stated his medical team was forced to evacuate the hospital as Israeli troops attacked the hospital. Medical Aid for Palestinians and the International Rescue Committee both also evacuated their medical teams when the IDF dropped leaflets telling nearby residents they were in a "dangerous combat zone." Following a visit to the hospital, the World Health Organization found 70% of staff and many patients had fled. Doctors reported many patients who were physically unable to move, and that conditions were rapidly deteriorating, with one doctor stating, "A child came in alive, literally burnt to the bone, their hands were contracting. Their face was just charcoal, and they were alive and talking. And we had no morphine."

In an interview with NPR on 10 January, one American doctor described the situation at Al-Aqsa as the "stuff of nightmares". Tedros Adhanom Ghebreyesus, the World Health Organization chief, stated, "Three months into this conflict, it is inconceivable that this most essential need — the protection of health care — is not assured." Health professionals and doctors warned of the danger of Al-Aqsa's closure since it was the last remaining hospital in the entirety of central Gaza. On 13 January, the hospital ran out of fuel to power its generators, leading to a blackout that threatened patients. The hospital again ran out of fuel in late-May 2024.

On 1 August 2026, the Israeli military destroyed two warehouses of medical supplies next to the Shuhada al-Aqsa Hospital. Hospital spokesperson Khalil al-Daqran stated that the bombing destroyed many supplies used by the dialysis department and intensive care.

=== Evacuation challenges ===
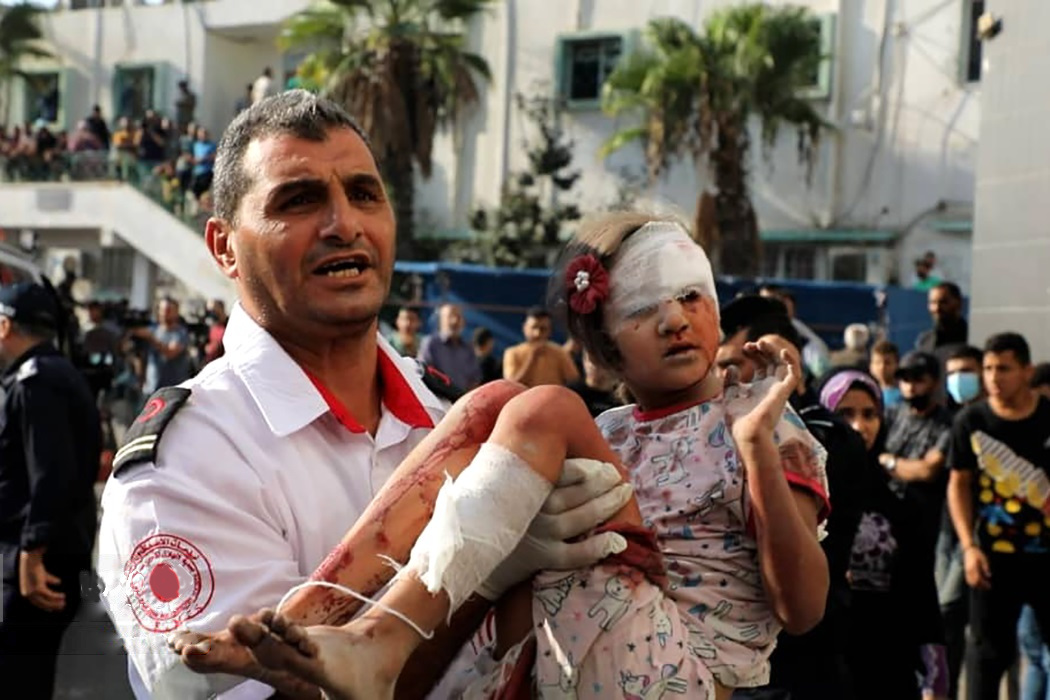
Medic carrying wounded Palestinian child in Gaza

On 14 October, Israel ordered the evacuation of 22 hospitals in northern Gaza. The WHO described the order as a "death sentence" for the sick and wounded. Doctors across northern Gaza stated they were unable to follow Israel's evacuation order, since their patients, including newborns in the ICU, would die. Doctors at al-Quds Hospital and the Palestine Red Crescent reported they received a call from the Israeli army to evacuate the hospital or "bear the consequences".

On 29 October, the Palestinian Red Crescent reported that it had received warnings from Israeli authorities to immediately evacuate al-Quds hospital as it was “going to be bombarded”. That day, an Israeli airstrike struck 20 metres (65 feet) from the hospital. Mai al-Kaila, the Palestinian Minister of Health, stated the Israeli army was not evacuating patients, but rather "forcibly evicting the wounded and patients onto the streets, leaving them to face inevitable death." The director of the Nasr Hospital stated it had been evacuated under threat of Israeli weapons and tanks. Fighting near Al-Quds Hospital halted evacuation efforts.

On 21 November, the World Health Organization stated three hospitals in northern Gaza would be evacuated, meaning there would be no functioning hospitals left in northern Gaza. On 23 November, four patients died in the transfer from northern Gaza to the Turkish-Palestinian Friendship Hospital. The Red Cross reported its staff were shot at while providing humanitarian support. The Gaza Health Ministry announced it would cease coordination with the WHO on patient evacuations following the Israeli arrest of Palestinian doctors. (Note: The Euro-Mediterranean Human Rights Monitor reported it had received reports that WHO either unwittingly or knowingly facilitated the doctors' arrests.) Staff at the Indonesia Hospital were reportedly ordered by the IDF to evacuate. The head of the Medical Emergency Rescue Committee stated patients and staff at the Indonesia Hospital were evacuated to the European Hospital in Khan Younis. Hospitals in northern Gaza, including al-Ahli Arab Hospital, were evacuated by the World Health Organization and the Red Cross.

The Health Ministry stated hundreds needed to be evacuated from Gaza to receive medical care. A spokesman for the Gaza crossing authority stated the Rafah crossing remained opened for the evacuation of the sick and wounded. On 7 December, the Palestinian Red Crescent stated 60 percent of the wounded in Gaza required urgent medical treatment abroad. Doctors Without Borders stated on 10 December stated that the Israeli army had forced them to evacuate the Martyrs and Beni Shueila clinics, and that healthcare had completely collapsed.

=== International aid ===
Avatar of Tedros Adhanom Ghebreyesus

Tedros Adhanom Ghebreyesus
(@DrTedros)
tweeted:

Patients were receiving care on the floor, screaming in pain. These conditions are beyond inadequate - unimaginable for the provision of health care. I cannot find words strong enough to express our concern over what we’re witnessing.

December 2, 2023

The Red Cross stated Gaza's entire health system was "on its knees". Medical Aid for Palestinians and UNICEF issued an "urgent warning" that 130 premature babies would die if fuel did not reach Gaza hospitals soon. A UN statement signed by five major branches stated deaths could soon "skyrocket" from disease and "lack of healthcare". On 23 October, the Indonesia Hospital ran out of fuel and completely lost power. The World Health Organization warned 46 of Gaza's 72 healthcare facilities had stopped functioning.

On 8 November, the Ministry of Defence of Italy announced it was sending a hospital ship to the coast of Gaza, in order to guarantee Palestinian civilians access to health services, essential goods and medical drugs. The ship, named Vulcano ("Volcano"), initially had 170 staff members on board, 30 of whom trained for medical emergencies; 28 more members between physicians, nurses and biologists were set to join the expedition in a later phase. (Note: The Italian Joint Operations Command also announced a plan to build an Armed Forces-owned field hospital within the Gaza Strip, although the designation of the specific site was subject to the assurance of basic safety conditions in the chosen area. The Ministry of Defence authorized medical staff from foreign countries and international organizations to join the personnel of both the hospital ship and the field hospital; as a result, six between physicians and nurses from the Qatar Armed Forces, as well as a medical team affiliated to the Francesca Rava Foundation, joined the staff of the ship. However, due to the constant escalation of the war in the Gaza Strip, the Vulcano was authorized to change its path following a NATO meeting, and arrived in Al'Arish, Egypt on 3 December.) By early-December, the medical staff started performing emergency surgical operations for injured Palestinian patients who were either at risk of amputation, or waiting to be moved to the Children Hospital in Doha. On 5 February 2024, it was announced that the Vulcano had returned to Italy and arrived at the seaport of La Spezia, carrying 60 Palestinian people, 14 of which were children in need of specialized healthcare, although none of them suffered from life-threatening conditions or injuries. All of the children were set to be transferred to various hospitals in Genoa, Rome, Florence, Bologna and Milan.

On 9 November, Health Minister Fahrettin Koca announced Turkey was prepared to receive Gaza's pediatric cancer patients. On 10 November, the International Red Cross stated Gaza's healthcare system had "reached a point of no return." The Government of Jordan reported Israel had ordered their field hospital to be evacuated and stated they would not comply. Italy and the United Arab Emirates stated they were considering establishing a field hospital in Gaza. A French warship was dispatched as a temporary hospital. On 2 December, Saudi Arabia donated six ambulances to the Palestinian Red Crescent. On 3 December, a UNICEF spokesman described Nasser Hospital as a "death zone."

WHO chief Tedros Adhanom Ghebreyesus stated fighting in southern Gaza was making it increasingly difficult to run health operations. On 10 December, WHO adopted a resolution to protect healthcare in Gaza, which director-general Tedros Adhanom Ghebreyesus described as "almost impossible in the current circumstances." On 12 December, WHO pleaded with the Israeli army not to destroy hospitals in southern Gaza. Doctors Without Borders said healthcare conditions in Gaza were akin to conditions during World War I.

=== Additional challenges ===
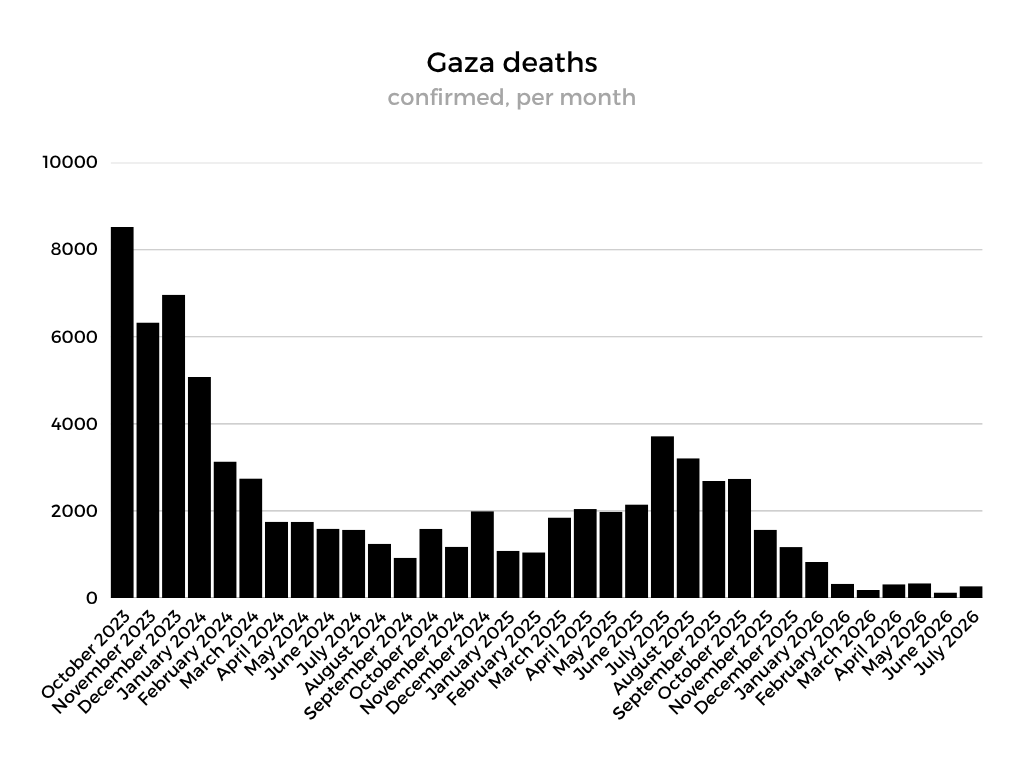
Gaza war deaths by month

On 28 October, a communications blackout meant wounded civilians could not dial emergency services. Ambulances were then evenly geographically distributed to provide "faster access to the injured." A surgeon at Al-Ahli hospital stated on 18 November they had run out of blood for transfusions.

Doctors in south Gaza reported a lack of beds and supplies. By 8 December, an estimated 286 health workers in Gaza had been killed by Israel. On 4 December, Doctors Without Borders stated hospitals in southern Gaza were overflowing with wounded patients. The Ministry of Health stated 50,000 people had been wounded since the start of the conflict.

The Red Crescent stated al-Quds was completely out of service on 12 November, as Al-Shifa also stopped receiving patients. On 16 November, the Indonesia Hospital completely shut down, leaving 45 patients in need of surgery. UNOCHA stated only four small hospitals in northern Gaza and eight health facilities in southern Gaza were still functioning. On 30 November, WHO chief Tedros Adhanom Ghebreyesus stated the health needs of Gaza had increased dramatically, though only one-third of its health facilities were functioning.

On 9 January, Rik Peeperkorn, the WHO representative for Israel and Palestine, stated, "I’ve never seen so many amputees in my life, including among children. This will have such a long-term impact on everything." On 18 January, the United Nations reported patients were dying even while hospitalized because Gaza's remaining hospitals were overwhelmed with tens of thousands of wounded people.

Israel shut the Gaza border crossings on 28 February 2026, the first day of the war with Iran, interrupting the entry of trucks carrying humanitarian aid and other essential supplies. The closure also stopped patients and injured people from leaving, raising alarm because thousands had been waiting to travel abroad for medical care after Israel's war had devastated Gaza's health system. After several days of closure, Israel partially reopened the Kerem Abu Salem, or Kerem Shalom, crossing and allowed a small number of trucks carrying aid and essential goods to enter. The reopening had little practical effect, however, as the amount of aid reaching Gaza remained well below the roughly 600 trucks a day needed to meet the population's needs. Economist Mohammad Abu Jiyab said the US-Israel war on Iran had directly worsened Gaza's economic and humanitarian conditions by cutting imports of aid and commercial goods. This had driven up prices, caused shortages, and weakened humanitarian distribution. Abu Jiyab warned that, if the situation continued, conditions in Gaza would deteriorate further. A UNICEF spokesperson added that prices for some basic goods, including food and cleaning products, had in some cases risen by 200% to 300%.

== Airstrikes ==
=== October ===
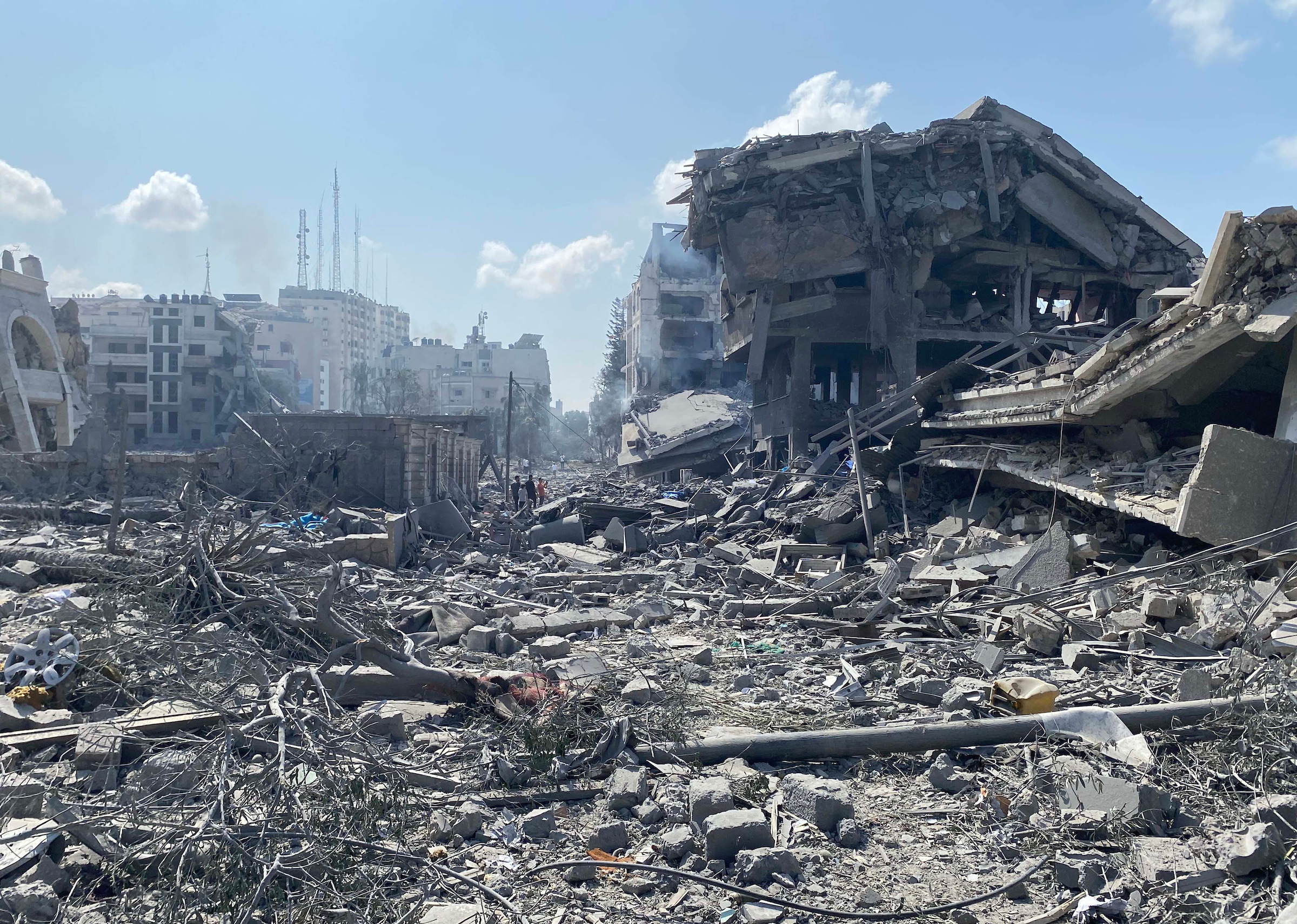
El-Remal in Gaza City following an Israeli airstrike, 10 October 2023

In just one week, Israel dropped more than 6,000 bombs on Gaza. Israel's airstrikes were described as a carpet bombing and "indiscriminate". By 16 October, airstrikes had killed 2,750 people, including more than 700 children, and wounded nearly 10,000. An additional 1,000 people were missing beneath rubble. On 16 October, Israeli airstrikes destroyed a UNRWA humanitarian aid supply depot. The same day, airstrikes destroyed the headquarters of the Palestinian Civil Defence, the agency responsible for emergency response services, including firefighting and search and rescue.

On 17 October, Israel conducted intensive airstrikes in southern Gaza, in areas it told residents to seek refuge. An airstrike at a UNRWA school killed at least six people. On 18 October, the Ahmed Abdel Aziz School in Khan Yunis was hit. On the same day, the death toll in Gaza had risen to 3,478. On 19 October, an Israeli airstrike hit the Church of Saint Porphyrius, where 500 people were sheltering. Israel "pounded" areas in south Gaza it had declared as "safe zones", raising fears amongst residents that nowhere was safe. On 19 October, U.S. officials reported alarm at Israeli comments about the "inevitability of civilian casualties", after it used the atomic bombings of Hiroshima and Nagasaki as historical comparisons for their Gaza campaign.

On 20 October, Israeli continued to bombard south Gaza. IDF spokesman Nir Dinar said, "There are no safe zones". On 21 October, Israel intensified its airstrikes in advance of an expected ground invasion. On 22 October, Israeli airplanes bombed the areas around the Al Shifa and Al Quds hospitals on a night described as the "bloodiest" of the conflict so far. On 23 October, airstrikes killed 436 people in the al-Shati camp and southern Khan Younis in just one night. On 26 October, Israeli PM Benjamin Netanyahu stated Israel had "already eliminated thousands of terrorists – and this is only the beginning". On 27 October, WHO stated more than 1,000 unidentified people were buried under rubble.

By 28 October, the Israeli Air Force bombed residential buildings without any prior warning, killing an estimated 50 people per hour. On 29 October, the IDF bombed the area around the Al-Quds hospital. On 30 October, Israel bombed the Turkish-Palestinian Friendship Hospital. On 31 October, an airstrike on the Jabalia refugee camp was described as a "massive massacre."

=== November ===
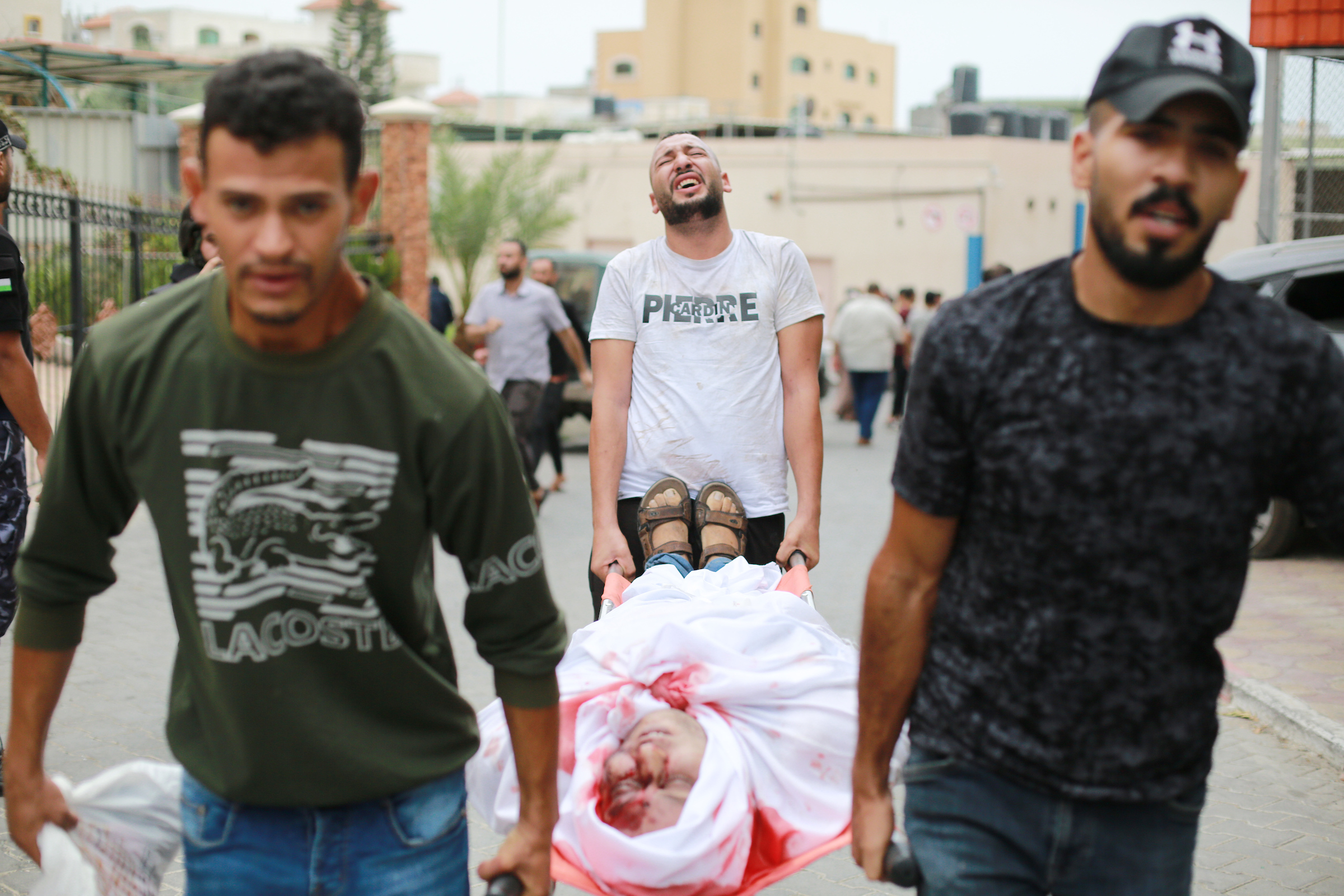
Victim of Israeli airstrike in Jabalia

On 3 November, the Health Ministry stated 1,200 children were buried under rubble, 136 paramedics had been killed, and 25 ambulance vehicles had been destroyed. On the same day, Israel bombed a medical convoy outside of al-Shifa hospital. The IDF claimed the ambulance was being used by Hamas, leading Queen's University professor Ardi Imseis to state Israel needed to prove its claim. The IDF also bombed the Osama Ben Zaid school. On 4 November, Israel bombed the al-Fakhoora School, killing at least fifteen people. Journalists reported Israel was targeting solar panels and personal generators. On 5 November, Israel bombed and destroyed Al-Azhar University. On 6 November, at least eight people died in airstrikes on the Nasser Medical Complex.

On 8 November, Israel bombed and destroyed the Khalid bin al-Walid Mosque. On 12 November, Israel used earthquake bombs on an apartment complex in Khan Younis, killing at least thirteen people. On 13 November, an Israeli airstrike on the Jabalia refugee camp killed thirty people, with Gaza's civil defence team unable to rescue injured people from the rubble due to a lack of equipment.

According to sources, both Israeli and Western, Hamas placed military facilities under schools, hospitals and mosques throughout Gaza (including Al-Shifa and the Indonesia Hospital), or used them as cover for its fighters. According to The Guardian, there were indications of Hamas' use of hospitals, schools and residential building as early as 2014. (Note: In 2022, a "man-made cavity" was discovered under the grounds of an UNRWA school in Gaza.) These claims have been disputed, however, including by organizations like Human Rights Watch, UNRWA, and the Palestinian Red Crescent. The Government of Qatar has criticized the lack of either concrete evidence or independent investigations, and both Palestinian and international medical staff have disputed them. Michael Lynk stated Israel's claims were used to prepare "public opinion for the attacks to come".

On 15 November, Gaza's last remaining flour mill was hit by an Israeli airstrike. On 17 November, dozens were reported killed after an airstrike on al-Falah School in the Zeitoun neighborhood, south of Gaza City. The following day, 26 people were killed in an airstrike of a residential building in southern Gaza. A strike on the Al-Fakhoora school reportedly killed at least 50. Deaf, blind, and intellectually handicapped individuals were at particular risk of death by airstrikes. Following Israel's evacuation orders for Palestinians to flee northern Gaza, the IDF intensified its attacks on southern Gaza. It again intensified strikes across Gaza before the temporary November ceasefire. By 26 November, Israel dropped an estimated 40,000 tons of explosives on Gaza.

=== December ===
In the hours following the end of the temporary truce between Israel and Hamas, 109 people were killed by Israeli airstrikes. On 2 December, the IDF stated it had struck at least 400 locations in Gaza since the pause had ended, including 50 in Khan Younis in southern Gaza. On 3 December, the Palestinian Civil Defence stated the situation "beyond dire" as the organization was unable to rescue many people buried under rubble. The same day, 700 were reported killed in the preceding twenty-four hours. Some individuals were rescued by aid workers after reportedly surviving several days buried underneath rubble. Robert Pape stated, "Gaza will also go down as a place name denoting one of history’s heaviest conventional bombing campaigns." On 8 December, 350 people were reportedly killed in the preceding twenty-four hours. On 9 December, the Palestinian Civil Defence stated it only had one operational rescue vehicle left in the entirety of northern Gaza. On 13 December, a UNRWA school in Beit Hanoun was destroyed by an Israeli airstrike. On 14 December, a US intelligence report found half of the bombs dropped on Gaza had been unguided bombs.

A Sky News analysis found Israel was directly targeting areas that it was telling people to flee to. Experts stated the bombing campaign against Gaza had been the deadliest and most destructive in modern history, with Corey Scher of the CUNY Graduate Center stating, "Gaza is now a different color from space." The Wall Street Journal described the Israeli bombing in Gaza as the "most devastating urban warfare in the modern record". Torrential rains caused flooding, which raised fears of disease spread.

=== January ===
On 5 January 2024, evacuees fleeing Israeli attacks in central Gaza stated the situation there was "hell on Earth." One survivor of an Israeli airstrike wrote, "Even though that air strike did not kill us, it destroyed something inside us." On 12 January, the UN Secretary-General for Human Rights stated that at least 319 internally displaced persons were killed and 1,135 injured by Israeli airstrikes while sheltering in UN shelters.

As of January 2024, Israel’s offensive has either damaged or destroyed 70–80% of all buildings in northern Gaza. Numerous casualties were reported in an airstrike on a residential building near Nasser Medical Complex in Khan Younis, with hospital staff reporting having to bury 40 bodies on the hospital grounds. By 30 January, at least half of all buildings in the entirety of Gaza had been destroyed or damaged.

=== February ===
On 2 February 2024, UNOSAT, the UN's satellite centre, found that 69,147 structures, or approximately 30 percent of Gaza's total buildings, had been damaged or destroyed by Israeli airstrikes, shelling, and demolitions. The New York Times estimated that at least half of Gaza's buildings had been damaged or destroyed. Israeli bombing campaigns intensified in central Gaza, as displaced people in Rafah grew fearful of an impending Israeli attack on the city.

== Displacement ==
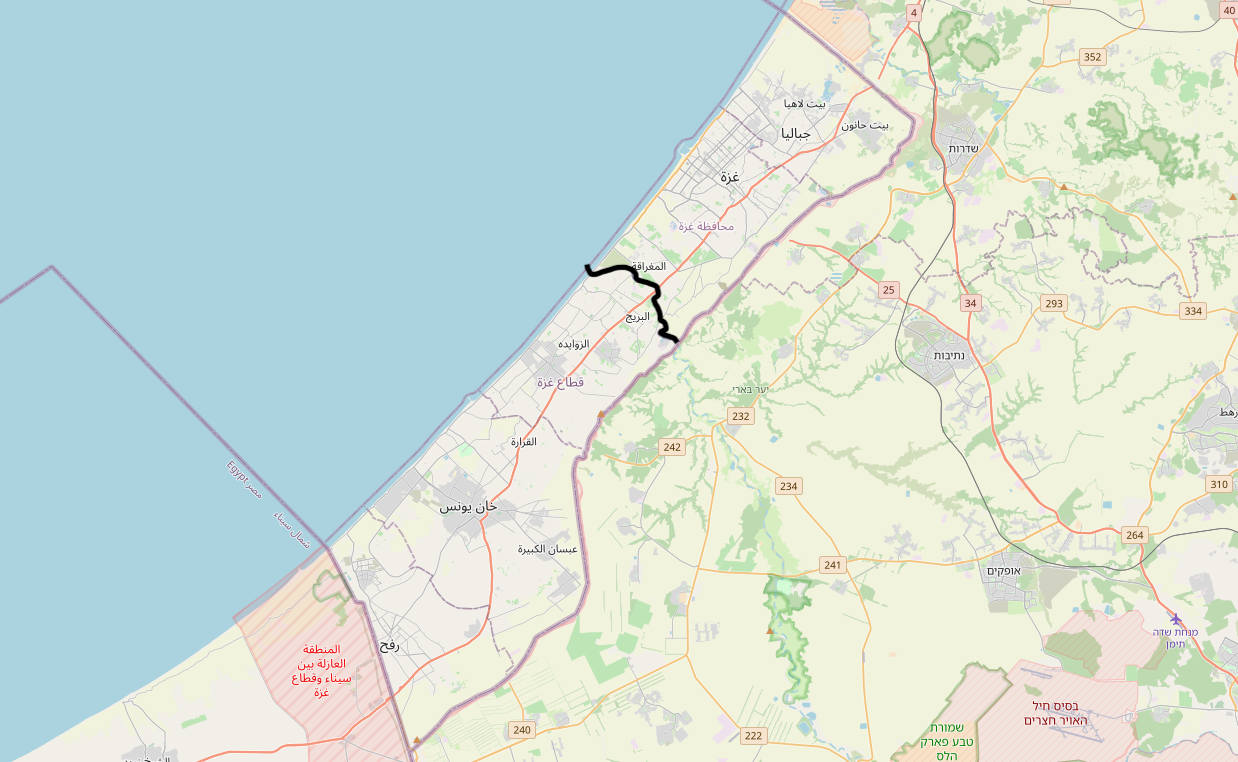
The line in black represents the IDF's boundary at Wadi Gaza for evacuation of the northern Gaza Strip

On 10 October, the United Nations said the fighting had displaced more than 423,000 Palestinians, while Israeli airstrikes had destroyed 1,000 homes and rendered 560 housing units uninhabitable. By 15 October, an estimated 1 million people in Gaza had been displaced, many of them fleeing northern Gaza following Israel's mandated evacuation. Due to continued heavy Israeli bombing in south Gaza, some northern Gazan refugees moved back to Gaza City. On 19 October, the UN Office for Humanitarian Affairs stated 98,000 houses, or 1 in every 4 homes in Gaza, had been destroyed by Israeli bombardments. On 21 October, the UNRWA stated 500,000 people were sheltering in UN facilities, and conditions had grown "untenable". By the end of October this had grown to over 670,000 people. Many others sheltered in hospitals.

By 22 October, the UN Office for Humanitarian Affairs stated 42% of homes in Gaza had been destroyed. By 23 October, an estimated 1.4 million people in Gaza had been left homeless. On 30 October, the Red Cross stated it would take years to rebuild destroyed homes and infrastructure. On 2 November, UNRWA stated 50 of its buildings and assets had been affected by Israeli strikes, including four shelters. On 6 November, Al Jazeera journalist Hani Mahmoud described southern Gaza as a large concentration camp. As the fighting in Gaza City intensified, the IDF announced a daily four-hour window for residents to move south, leading to thousands fleeing the city. On 10 November, an Israeli spokesman stated 100,000 people had fled northern Gaza in the prior two days. On 11 November, UNICEF stated thousands of children in northern Gaza were "hanging on by a thread."

On 12 November, CARE International stated, "The journey to the south is incredibly dangerous and hard. Many of those who have made it out have experienced and witnessed terrible suffering." On 14 November, Human Rights Watch stated, "There is no reliably safe route to evacuate. Satellite imagery confirms fires, military operations, and roadblocks on every conceivable route." By 20 November, satellite imagery showed half of northern Gaza had been destroyed by Israeli airstrikes. The Financial Times described northern Gaza as a "bombed-out wasteland." Palestinians feared northern Gaza was becoming uninhabitable. By 28 November, the UN estimated 60 percent of all housing in Gaza had been destroyed. The Financial Times estimated it would cost billions to rebuild Gaza. (Note: Mohammed Mustafa, the chief economist of the Palestine Investment Fund, estimated rebuilding Gaza's homes alone would cost around $15 billion USD.)

On 1 December, Israel labelled Khan Younis a "dangerous combat zone." It issued a map of numbered zones, dividing the Gaza Strip into hundreds of different districts. It also issued an evacuation order in southern Gaza for residents to move to Rafah. At the same time it issued the evacuation, Israel bombed Rafah. On 4 December, a UN representative stated "another wave of displacement is underway." The UN stated at least four of its shelters in Khan Younis had received evacuation orders from the Israeli military. By 13 December, half of Gaza's population was in Rafah. On 21 December, a Financial Times analysis found Israel had left northern Gaza virtually uninhabitable. On 6 January 2024, UN humanitarian chief Martin Griffiths stated that Gaza had "simply become uninhabitable". More than 85% of Palestinians in Gaza, or around 1.9 million people, were internally displaced.

On 8 January, Al Jazeera reported Palestinians in Gaza were using websites like GoFundMe to fundraise the necessary money to enter Egypt via the Rafah Crossing. UNOCHA reported there were as many 15 people living per tent. On 13 January, the Gaza Health Ministry reported the infrastructure of Rafah was at its breaking point, unable to handle the large number of displaced people who'd fled there. Philippe Lazzarini stated on 17 January, "You have hundreds of thousands of people living now in the street, living in these plastic makeshift tents, sleeping on the concrete." On 24 January, Israel ordered a large area of Khan Younis to evacuate, affecting three hospitals, 24 United Nations shelters, and more than 500,000 people. In February 2024, Gaza's information office stated the IDF was deliberately burning homes.

According to the Gaza Government Media Office, on November 7, 2026, about 70,000 tents housing displaced Palestinians were flooded within 12 hours of the first winter storm in the Gaza Strip and tens of thousands of people were displaced. The office blamed Israel for this disaster by closing the crossings and preventing the entry of shelter and reconstruction equipment. The office also estimated initial damages at around $3 million.

== Communications ==
Since the start of the war on 7 October, Gaza has undergone numerous communications blackouts. Direct attacks on telecommunications infrastructure by Israel, electricity blockades and fuel shortages have caused the near-total collapse of Gaza's largest cell network providers. Lack of internet access has obstructed Gazan citizens from communicating with loved ones, learning of IDF operations, and identifying both the areas most exposed to bombing and possible escape routes. The blackouts have also impeded emergency services, making it more difficult to locate and access the time-critical injured, and have impeded humanitarian aid agencies and journalists as well.

On 27 October, Gaza underwent a near total communications blackout after Paltel's communication towers were destroyed in an Israeli attack. This cut off Gaza from any phone or internet service. As a result, humanitarian groups, including UNICEF, WHO, the Palestine Red Crescent Society, Doctors Without Borders, American Friends Service Committee, Medical Aid for Palestinians, and ActionAid lost all contact with their staff. The Palestinian Red Crescent Society stated wounded people would no longer be able to dial Gaza's emergency number for an ambulance. The Red Crescent stated it was "deeply concerned" about the ability of medics to provide care, stating it had lost all contact with operations room and staff in Gaza. On 28 October, Elon Musk offered to provide humanitarian groups with Starlink access, but Shlomo Karhi stated Israel would fight it with every "means at its disposal” because Hamas will use it for terrorist activities.

The UN Assistant Secretary-General and Humanitarian Coordinator in the Occupied Palestinian Territory, Lynn Hastings, stated that hospitals and aid operations could not operate without phone lines or internet. The Committee to Protect Journalists warned the world was "losing a window into the reality" of the situation in Gaza. Michael Lynk, a former UN rapporteur, stated one purpose of the internet blackout was to keep "the world blinded on what's happening." The WHO secretary-general Tedros Ghebreyesus stated he was "gravely concerned" by the blackout for the "immediate health risks" it posed to patients and for the safety of WHO staff. In a post on X, ActionAid wrote the blackout would make it "nearly impossible" for people to seek help, and stated they were "gravely concerned" for "all the people of Gaza."

Marwa Fatafta, policy manager of Access Now, stated that "taking Gaza completely off the grid while launching an unprecedented bombardment campaign only means something atrocious is about to happen." On 28 October, Netblocks stated Gaza's telephone and internet communications were gradually returning. On 31 October, Fatafta stated the blackout had been used by Israel to cover up potential war crimes as they began their ground invasion and called it a "warfare tactic to induce more pain on the population." Paltel announced Gaza had again been cut off from telecommunications and internet service. On 3 November, the BBC began broadcasting an emergency radio service on mediumwave from Cyprus in attempt to retain communications with Gazan civilians and support information-finding such as "where to access shelter, food and water supplies". On 5 November, internet and telecoms were cut for a third time. Some residents used eSIMs to stay connected to mobile networks. On 16 November, communications in Gaza were cut off for a fourth time. The following day, communications were restored after a limited quantity of fuel was allowed to enter the Gaza Strip. On 27 November, Shlomo Karhi stated Musk had agreed not to operate Starlink in Gaza without Israeli approval. On 3 December, PalTel reported another communications blackout. On 14 December, Gaza's communication companies reported the sixth communications blackout since the conflict's start.

On 20 December, Paltel, Ooredoo, and Jawwal reported a communications blackout in the Gaza Strip. Wounded people unable to call ambulances due to the blackouts reported biking and taking donkey carts to hospitals, while ambulance drivers stated they simply followed plumes of smoke or the sound of explosions. Telecoms went down on 26 December. On 12 January, the ninth communications blackout occurred, cutting off phone and internet access across the Strip. The following day, Jawwal reported an Israeli drone strike had killed two of their engineers attempting to repair the system, noting they had lost a total of 13 employees so far. The communications blackout was the longest of the war. (Note: Service partially returned on 19 January, making the seven-day-long blackout the longest of the war thus far.) The tenth blackout occurred on 22 January. In a statement, UNWRA stated, "Disruption of telecommunication services prevents people in Gaza from accessing life-saving information or calling for first responders, and continues to impede humanitarian response." The Ministry of Communications stated on 27 January that Israel had fired live bullets and a tank shell at its telecommunications crews. NetBlocks reported a "high impact" outage on 5 March. Internet was disrupted on 25 May 2024.

By December 2023 200,000 Gazans (approximately 10% of the population) had received internet access through an eSIM provided by Connecting Humanity.

== Humanitarian aid ==
=== Initial block on aid ===
The amount of aid coming in is a drop in the bucket of Gaza’s humanitarian needs. Before this conflict, about 100 trucks of aid alone entered Gaza [a day]. So imagine now, with all the hostilities going on, if only this number is coming in.

— Mey al Sayegh, (Red Cross)

On 9 October, Israel implemented a complete blockade on Gaza, preventing the entry of any humanitarian aid. Egypt closed its border to prevent civilians fleeing, but said that it would allow aid to be delivered through the Rafah crossing. A week later, despite international calls for deliveries, hundreds of tons of aid were stuck on Egypt's side of the border, as Israel bombarded the crossing amid fears of weapons deliveries, and declined to assure Egyptian authorities it would pause airstrikes for civilian aid convoys. In Israel, aid to Gaza was reportedly prevented by far-right politicians allied with Netanyahu. On 17 October, the UNRWA stated that there was currently "no water or electricity in Gaza. Soon there will be no food or medicine either".

=== Deliveries to southern Gaza ===
On 18 October, Israel announced it would allow food, water, and medicine to be delivered to a "safe zone" in west Khan Younis in southern Gaza, distributed by the United Nations. Later the same day, US president Joe Biden announced Egypt agreed to allow 20 trucks with aid to enter Gaza by 20 October. More than 100 trucks of aid were waiting at the Rafah crossing to enter into Gaza. In a statement, Human Rights Watch stated that without electricity or fuel, however, the provided aid would fail "meeting the needs of Gaza's population". On 19 October, US Special Envoy David M. Satterfield stated the US wanted "sustained" aid into Gaza. The same day, a spokesman for Oxfam stated aid distribution in Gaza would be a "big challenge", and the UN reported at least 100 trucks a day of aid were needed. On 21 October 20 trucks of aid entered Gaza. António Guterres stated it was not enough to prevent a "humanitarian catastrophe". Martin Griffiths said the UN was working to develop an "at-scale operation". On 22 October, following the second delivery of trucks, Biden and Netanyahu stated aid would continue to be allowed into Gaza.

=== Issues with delivery ===
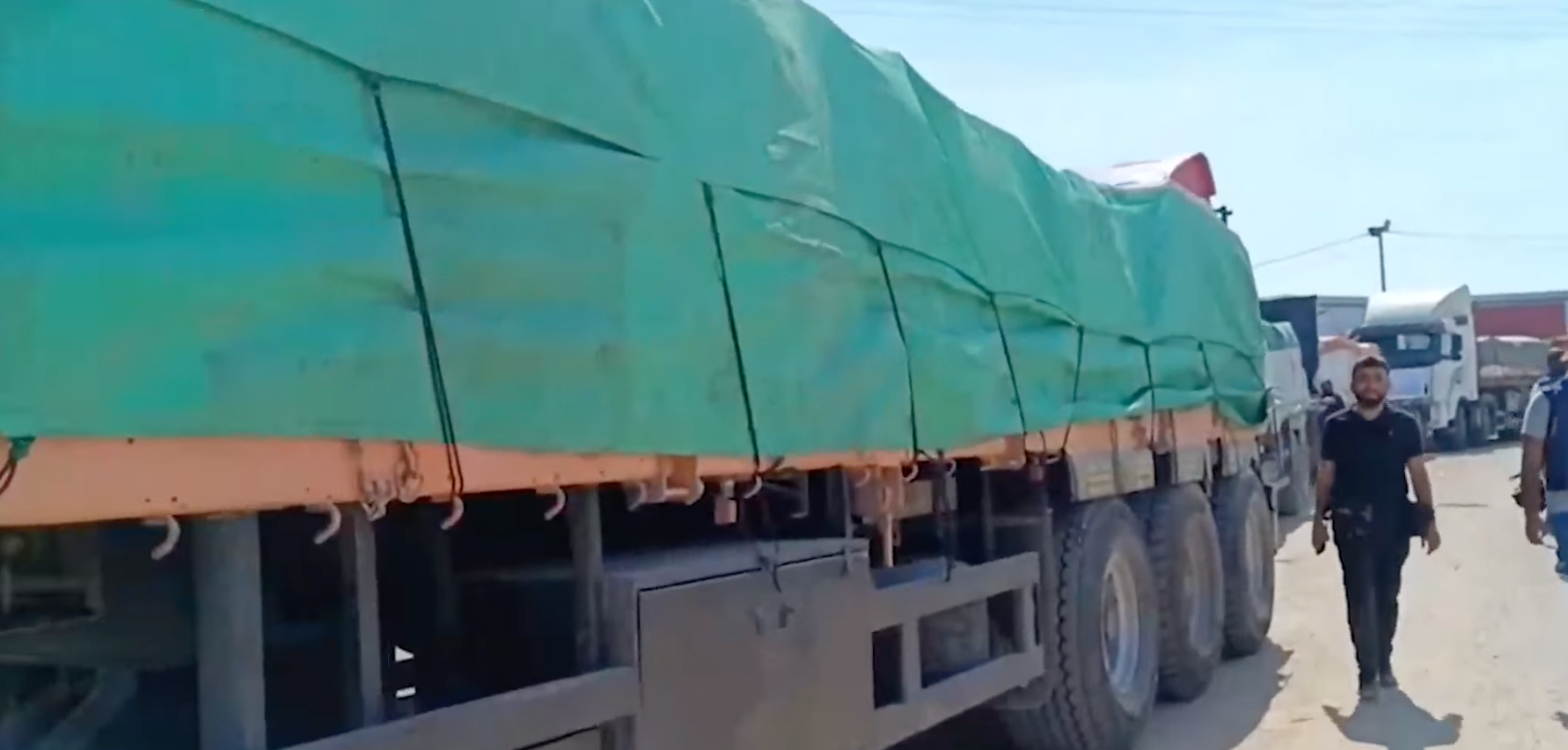
Trucks with humanitarian aid waiting to cross from Egypt into the Gaza Strip

On 27 October, Lynn Hastings, the UN's humanitarian coordinator for Palestine, stated Israel opposed the delivery of humanitarian aid to northern Gaza. As a result, UN staff would need to risk their own lives if it was determined such aid would be "lifesaving" to people in need. Philippe Lazzarini stated "soon many more will die" from Israel's blockade.

When asked about Hamas's responsibility for the safety of civilians, Hamas leader Mousa Abu Marzook allegedly replied that "it is the responsibility of the United Nations to protect them... [and] it is the responsibility of the occupation to provide them with... services". On 28 October, The New York Times reported that Hamas had stockpiled food, water, medicine and sanitary products in underground caches, in amounts that would allow it to continue fighting for several months without resupply. On 12 November, Kan 11 aired a video taken by a Gazan civilian, that appeared to show Hamas policemen beating civilians approaching a truck carrying humanitarian aid for food, before allegedly taking the supplies for themselves.

Egyptian Foreign Minister Sameh Shoukry stated "Israeli obstacles" were impeding the delivery of humanitarian aid. The United Nations announced the communications blackout had brought aid delivery to a "complete halt." On 29 October, a humanitarian zone was announced in the Khan Younis area, along with a claim that aid trucks would increase "significantly." On 30 October, OCHA director Lisa Doughten pressured the UN Security Council for the use of extra entry points to Gaza, suggesting the Kerem Shalom border crossing as the only entry equipped for rapidly processing a sufficiently large number of trucks. On 13 November, the United Nations announced it no longer had enough fuel to deliver humanitarian aid in Gaza, leading Canadian Foreign Minister Melanie Joly to say, "This is not acceptable." On 17 November, the UN suspended aid delivery again due to the shortage of fuel and the cutoff of communications.

=== Delivery during temporary ceasefire ===
The amount of aid entering Gaza increased during the temporary November ceasefire. On 26 November, the largest shipment of humanitarian aid reached northern Gaza since the start of the conflict nearly two months before. Philippe Lazzarini stated the aid entering Gaza was still inadequate. Samer AbdelJaber, a World Food Programme head, stated people were hungry and desperate. On 28 November, the White House reported that over 2,000 trucks of aid had entered Gaza since 21 October.

=== Resumption of hostilities ===
Following the resumption of hostilities on 1 December, aid deliveries into Gaza ceased. The IDF informed the Palestinian Red Crescent that the entry of trucks was "prohibited, starting from today" until further notice. Later the same day, the United States announced they had requested a reversal of the decision, and Israel stated it was prepared to allow aid at pre-pause levels. On 4 December, the United Nations Office for the Coordination of Humanitarian Affairs (OCHA) stated that approximately 100 humanitarian aid trucks and 69,000 litres of fuel entered Gaza on 3 December and 4 December. This was “well below” the on average 170 trucks and 110,000 litres of fuel that were delivered daily during the temporary ceasefire. On 4 December, Lynn Hastings, a UN humanitarian coordinator, stated, "The conditions required to deliver aid to the people of Gaza do not exist" and warned of a "hellish scenario" in which aid delivery was entirely impossible. (Note: Shortly after these comments, the Israeli government revoked Hastings' visa) Josep Borrell shared a warning on social media from Martin Griffiths stating an immediate ceasefire was needed for the UN to continue humanitarian operations. WHO stated Israel shot at its humanitarian relief trucks in Gaza City.

On 15 December, Israel approved reopening of the Kerem Shalom crossing and announced that the US would be paying to upgrade the Rafah crossing. Following a tour of the Rafah crossing, MEP Barry Andrews stated he believed Israel was deliberately delaying aid deliveries to the Gaza Strip. On 19 December, UNRWA headquarters was bombed. UN chief Antonio Guterres stated the way Israel was conducting its offensive was creating obstacles for delivery. On 29 December, Israel fired on a humanitarian aid truck marked with U.N. insignia. Israel announced on 31 December it was prepared to allow aid ships from Cyprus to enter Gaza. France and Jordan airdropped aid on 5 January. On 11 January, Samer AbdelJaber, a World Food Programme director, stated the organization had delivered "crucial food assistance to thousands of people facing catastrophic hunger" in Gaza City for the first time in weeks.

On 13 January 2024, UNOCHA reported the amount of aid Israel was allowing into Israel had significantly deceased since the prior month. Omar Shakir, Human Rights Watch's Israel-Palestine director, stated, "This is a deliberate Israeli government policy. Aid is not reaching north Gaza." U.S. senators Chris Van Hollen and Jeff Merkley criticized Israel's inspection of humanitarian aid as "arbitrary" and "broken". A joint statement by the heads of UNICEF, WHO, and the World Food Programme stated the limited quantity of aid arriving in Gaza was unable to prevent the "deadly combination of hunger, malnutrition, and disease". A viral video showed huge crowds of hungry people rushing toward a rumored relief truck. On 16 January, a deal was reached between Israel and Hamas to bring more aid into Gaza. On 19 January, UNOCHA reported that nearly 70% of its aid deliveries to northern Gaza had been denied by Israel. On 29 January, the United Nations reported that Israel had denied 29 aid missions to northern Gaza.

In late-January, at least 15 countries announced they were suspending funding for UNRWA. Philippe Lazarrini, the agency chief, stated, "Our humanitarian operation, on which 2 million people depend as a lifeline in Gaza, is collapsing." The regional director of Doctors Without Borders stated, "If you stop these trucks, people will die of hunger and very quickly". UNRWA warned that without continued funding, it would be forced to cease operations by the end of February 2024.

=== Killing of aid workers ===
From 7 October to 17 December, 135 United Nations relief workers were killed in the Gaza Strip, making it the deadliest conflict for UN workers in world history. According to Jeremy Konyndyk, the president of Refugees International, "The U.S. concern about these casualties remains almost purely rhetorical. There is no policy leverage being put behind it whatsoever. Beyond expressing concern and expressing regret, that's where it stops." On 24 February 2024, the U.S. asked Israel to cease killing police in Gaza, stating it was exacerbating the crisis and leading to a "total breakdown of law and order".

== Impact on children ==
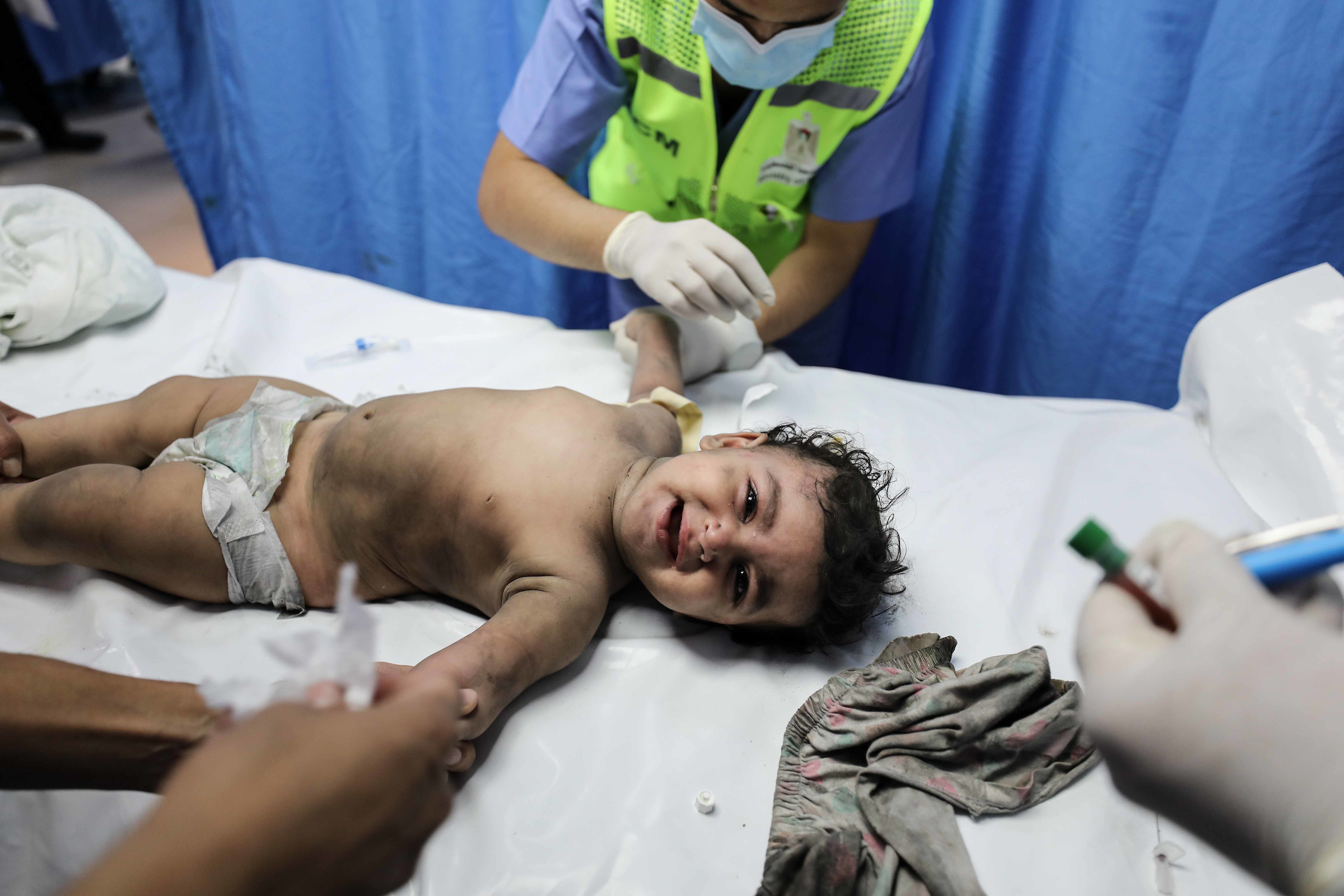
Wounded infant at Al-Shifa Hospital, 11 October 2023

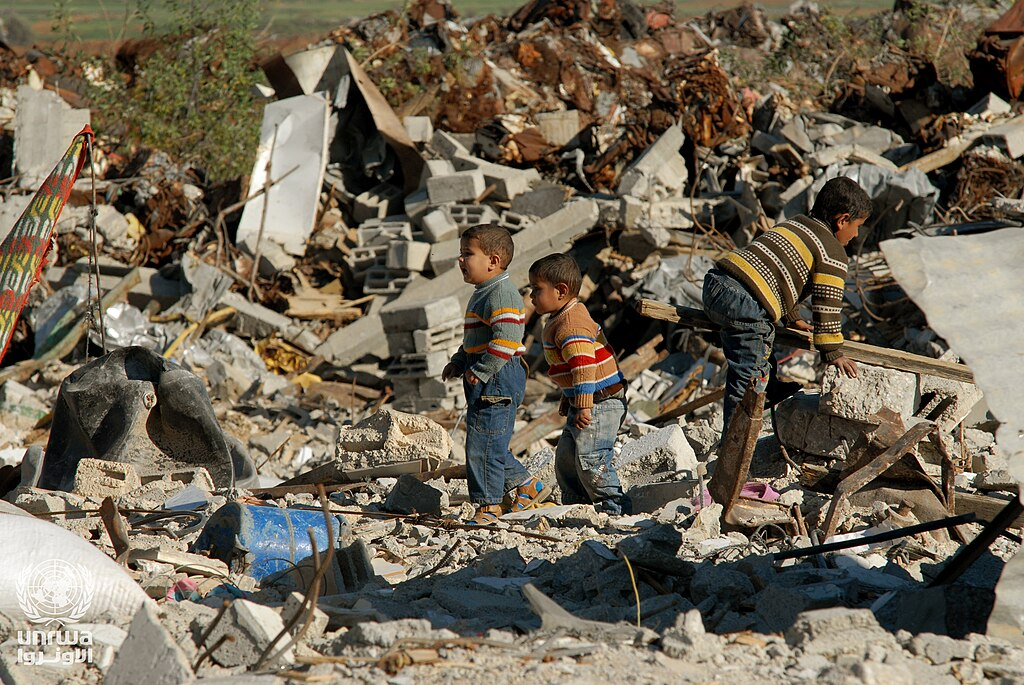
Boys salvaging a destroyed building in the Gaza Strip

The Gaza war has disproportionately affected children, who make up about 40% of the population of the Gaza Strip. In November 2023, UN Secretary General António Guterres warned that "Gaza is becoming a graveyard for children. Hundreds of girls and boys are reportedly being killed or injured every day." As the war continued, the toll increased steadily, reaching at least 19,424 children by 3 September 2025.

Within the first month of the war, about 700,000 children in Gaza had been displaced. A May 2025 estimate reports that 1.9 million people, roughly 90% of Gaza's population, had been displaced by the war. Many had been uprooted repeatedly, in some cases more than ten times. The collapse of essential services created a humanitarian crisis, as families struggled to access food, clean water, and medical care. The ongoing crisis also impacted routine vaccinations, leaving thousands of children at risk of preventable disease. Additional hardships included inadequate shelter, a lack of adequate winter clothing, and the continuing psychological toll on children's mental health.

As a result of the war, many children had sustained amputations and other permanent disabilities, as well as psychological trauma. Thousands more suffered from dehydration, malnutrition, diseases linked to the lack of clean water such as gastroenteritis, and respiratory diseases.

In January 2024, two months into the war, the UNICEF deputy director described the situation of children in Gaza as the "most horrific" he had ever seen. (Note: He also called for immediate and "unconditional" release of Israeli children who were being held hostage by Hamas.) By August 2025, humanitarian conditions for children were reported to have reached an unprecedented level of severity, affecting every aspect of their rights and well-being. Nutritional conditions had become catastrophic, with an officially confirmed famine in three of Gaza's five governorates. A June 2026 UN Independent International Commission of Inquiry report found that Israel had killed approximately 20,000 children and injured 44,000 more since 7 October 2023. The report documented cases of children being killed by single, precise gunshots from snipers and drones, which it said indicated deliberate targeting rather than incidental harm.

Breakdown of deaths by age and gender (analysis by professors Michael Spagat and Daniel Silverman), November 2023
1. Men and boys over 14 (35.3%)
2. Women and girls over 14 (24.1%)
3. Children under 14 (33.8%)
4. Elderly, above 60 (6.80%)

On 22 November, UNICEF reported unaccompanied children had been identified evacuating from northern to southern Gaza by themselves. On 28 November, James Elder, a UNICEF spokesperson, stated wounded children were sheltering outdoors in car parks and gardens. Elder called the conflict in Gaza a "war on children." Doctors warned children who survived Israeli airstrikes were left with permanent disabilities and trauma. Aid workers coined the term WCNSF, meaning Wounded Child No Surviving Family. The bodies of some children buried under rubble remained unrecovered. By 3 December, an estimated 6,150 children had been killed in the conflict. In mid-December, the Ministry of Health stated it had run out of vaccinations for children, which would have catastrophic repercussions. The Euro-Med Monitor estimated at least 25,000 children had lost one or both parents. On 19 December, the United Nations stated Gaza was "by far the most dangerous place in the world to be a child". More children were killed in Gaza in two and a half months than the total of children killed in all conflicts around the world in the previous three years combined.

On 21 December, UNICEF reported thousands of children had undergone limb amputations. Save the Children reported 10 children a day in Gaza had lost their limbs, which would result in a lifetime of medical needs. On 28 December, UNOCHA stated 50 percent of all children in the Gaza Strip were experiencing dehydration, malnutrition, respiratory and skin diseases. An UNOCHA representative stated the organization was having difficulty delivering childhood vaccines. On 3 January 2024, UNICEF chief Catherine M. Russell stated many children in Gaza were facing severe acute malnutrition. On 5 January, UNICEF found 90 percent of children under the age of two were eating two or fewer food groups a day.

On 6 January 2024, Tanya Haj-Hassan, a doctor with Doctors Without Borders, stated children in Gaza were "dying in every way possible." In some cases, newborns were rescued from under rubble after surviving bombings. A report by Save the Children on 12 January stated children were "enduring unspeakable horrors, including life-changing injuries, burns, disease, inadequate medical care, and losing their parents and other loved ones". On 16 January, doctors reported children weakened by starvation were dying from hypothermia. On 18 January, the deputy executive director of UNICEF stated the suffering of children in Gaza were the "most horrific conditions I have ever seen." By mid-January 2024, an estimated 10,000 children in Gaza had been killed, with thousands more buried under rubble.

An Action Aid coordinator stated on 27 January that children without winter coats were suffering from the cold and rainfall of the winter months, with new commercial products prevented from being brought in. An Al Jazeera correspondent reported he had witnessed children sleeping in mud-filled tents. Describing the impact of war on children's mental health, the Save the Children director of humanitarian policy stated the war had "starved and robbed any sense of safety and security". On 29 January, UNICEF reported that 16,000 children were at risk of missing routine vaccinations.

Ahead of an expected Israel invasion of Rafah, Catherine M. Russell stated, "We need Gaza’s last remaining hospitals, shelters, markets and water systems to stay functional. Without them, hunger and disease will skyrocket, taking more child lives."

=== Birth and pregnancy ===
An estimated 150 babies were born in Gaza per day since the start of the conflict. A pediatric doctor at the Emirati Hospital in Rafah, stated the number of premature babies born in Gaza had risen sharply. Newborn babies receiving specialized care in the West Bank were separated from their mothers who were trapped in Gaza. Oxfam stated newborn babies were dying from preventable diseases such as infection, hypothermia, diarrhea, and dehydration. By mid-December, parents were struggling to feed newborn babies, as mothers had insufficient nutrition to breastfeed. Newborn babies born during the conflict died in airstrikes, though some were rescued from the rubble. A UNOCHA representative stated she had met a woman forced to give birth in the street, and that the baby had died. One woman reported being unable to bathe her newborns more than ten days after their birth, due to the lack of clean water.

On 18 January 2024, Natalia Kanem, the executive director of the UN Population Fund, spoke at the World Economic Forum at Davos, stating the situation was the "worst nightmare" the UNPF representative had ever witnessed, as there were 180 women giving birth daily, sometimes on the streets of Gaza, as the territory's health system collapsed. On 17 January, Care International reported a 300 percent increase in the rate of miscarriage in Gaza since the start of Israel's bombing. UNICEF reported on 19 January that 20,000 babies had been born in the Gaza Strip since 7 October. UNICEF described each birth as a baby being "delivered into hell", and stated "humanity cannot allow this warped version of normal to persist any longer." The UN Women's agency reported that since the start of the conflict, two mothers in Gaza had been killed every hour, every day. WHO reported an increase in stress-induced stillbirths.

Doctors Without Borders stated that women were giving birth in plastic tents, and that those undergoing C-sections were being released within hours. It also reported that women were being turned away from hospitals due to overcrowding, with some forced to birth in public restrooms.

=== Premature babies ===
Premature babies at Al-Shifa

The plight of Gaza's premature babies gained global attention. In late October, Gaza's premature babies faced a critical situation as Medical Aid for Palestinians and UNICEF warned that 130 infants were at risk of death due to a hospital fuel shortage caused by Israel's siege. The lack of fuel led to power outages, endangering premature babies in neonatal intensive care units (NICUs). Despite assurances from the IDF to assist in evacuations, the Gaza Health Ministry reported a lack of evacuation mechanisms, resulting in the deaths of several infants.

The situation escalated in mid-November when Israel launched a raid on al-Shifa Hospital. Evacuations eventually occurred, facilitated by the Palestinian Red Crescent, World Health Organization, and UNOCHA, with 31 premature babies moved to southern Gaza, with most then to Egypt. Not all infants were accompanied by their parents, and two died at al-Shifa before the evacuation occurred.

The distress extended to Al-Nasr Children’s Hospital, bombed by the IDF in early November, where medical workers had to leave babies in incubators during evacuation. Video footage later revealed the aftermath, with five premature babies found dead in their incubators. The IDF initially denied responsibility, though an Israel official was heard providing assurances to evacuate the hospital in a released audio. In mid-December, a military siege on Kamal Adwan Hospital worsened the situation, as IDF soldiers reportedly prevented staff from supporting 12 babies in intensive care.

== Reactions ==
A variety of experts, organizations, and countries have labelled Israel's actions against Gaza as genocidal, using a variety of aspects of the humanitarian crisis as evidence. During a press conference in April 2024, NATO chief Jens Stoltenberg stated, "What we see now in Gaza is a humanitarian catastrophe."

=== Aid organizations ===
A Doctors Without Borders video shared by Amnesty International head Agnès Callamard stated, "This brutal annihilation of an entire populations health system stretches beyond what humanitarian aid can fix." On 4 December, Red Cross president Mirjana Spoljaric Egger visited the Gaza Strip, stating, "the things I saw there are beyond anything that anyone should be in a position to describe." On 10 December, Bushra Khalidi, an expert with Oxfam, stated the situation was no longer "just a catastrophe, it's apocalyptic."

On 11 December, the presidents of six major humanitarian organizations — CARE USA, Mercy Corps, the Norwegian Refugee Council, Oxfam America, Refugees International, and Save the Children — penned a joint op-ed in The New York Times in which they stated, "We have seen nothing like the siege of Gaza". On 13 December, a group of Israeli human rights and civil society organizations, including B'Tselem, penned an open-letter to Joe Biden urging him to use his influence to help stop the "catastrophic" humanitarian crisis in Gaza. Freedom House warned the humanitarian crisis was growing increasingly dire and called on the Israeli government to follow international humanitarian law.

On 27 December, an MSF representative stated, "You absolutely cannot depict this as a humanitarian response: When we cannot guarantee the safety of our teams". Mairav Zonszein, a Crisis Group analyst, stated, "It is clear Israel's war objective is not eradicating Hamas, but eradicating the ability to live in Gaza." B'Tselem reported on 8 January that Israel bore a "positive obligation to allow rapid and unimpeded passage of humanitarian aid, including food" into Gaza. On 11 January, the Oxfam Middle East director stated, "The scale and atrocities that Israel is visiting upon Gaza are truly shocking. For 100 days the people of Gaza have endured a living hell." On 14 January, the spokesman for the Norwegian Refugee Council (NRC) stated, "Gaza has been made unlivable for military reasons and all civilians are paying the price." The following day, the secretary general of the NRC stated it was the worst humanitarian crises of this century.

In response to a week-long communications blackout across Gaza in January 2024, the non-profit Access Now stated, "It is unconscionable to toy with connectivity amidst unprecedented violence and unfathomable human suffering." On 9 February, an International Rescue Committee representative stated, "If they aren’t killed in the fighting, Palestinian children, women and men will be at risk of dying by starvation or disease." On 18 February, the heads of eight major humanitarian organizations wrote a joint op-ed, stating, "The speed of the deterioration in Gaza is unprecedented in recent history." On 3 March, the head of the International Federation of Red Cross and Red Crescent Societies stated people in Gaza were in "desperate need of food, water, shelter, and medical care, with no sense of safety". Civicus described the situation as "one of the worst humanitarian crises in recent global history". Agnès Callamard, the head of Amnesty, stated, "While the international community is busy pretending Gaza is a humanitarian crisis, Israel continues to violate international law in total impunity".

A letter to the editor of the British medical journal The Lancet warned that the actual death toll in Gaza from both direct and indirect causes could be more than 186,000. Jean-François Corty, a humanitarian doctor and president of the NGO Doctors of the World, said that the Gaza Health Ministry's figures take into account the identified dead, "without taking into account all the dead left under the rubble of the bombardments, or the indirect victims who died because of a lack of care or access to care, or from being transported to a health centre. If you add those who are likely to die of malnutrition or as a result of wounds inflicted by Israeli bombardments in the weeks and months to come, because of the risks of superinfection and because their pathology will be treated late, then yes, the figure of 186,000 deaths mentioned in The Lancet is credible."

==== United Nations ====
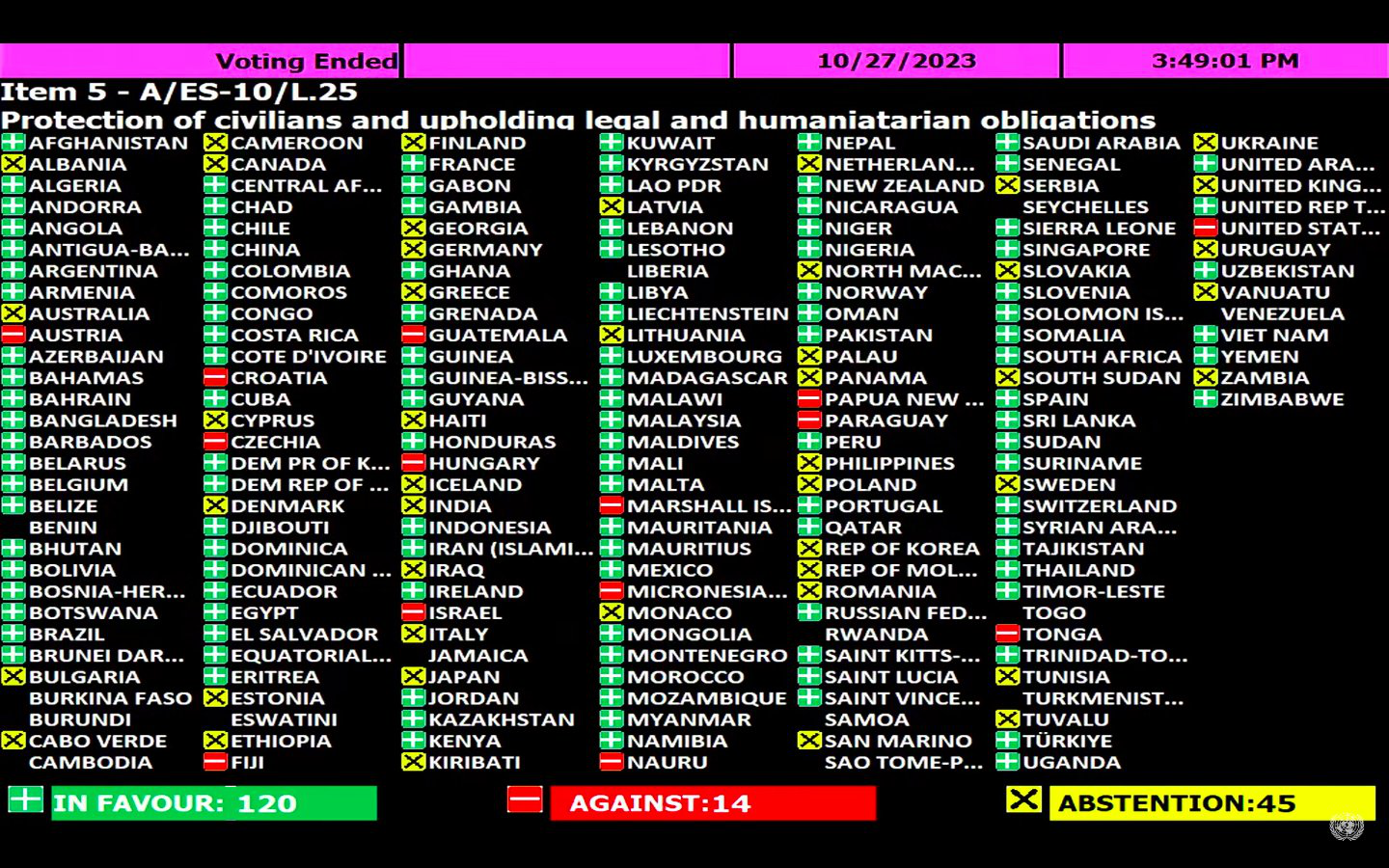
On 27 October, the United Nations General Assembly passed Resolution ES-10/21 calling for an "immediate and sustained" humanitarian truce and cessation of hostilities.

UNRWA commissioner Philippe Lazzarini described the situation as "bone-chilling," and the World Health Organization stated that it was "spiraling out of control." On October 26, the World Organization declared that Gaza's humanitarian and health crisis had "reached catastrophic proportions." Martin Griffiths, the United Nations head of Humanitarian Affairs, stated the humanitarian crisis in Gaza was the worst he had ever seen in his life, stating, "I don’t say that lightly. I mean, I started off in my 20s dealing with the Khmer Rouge, and you remember how bad that was, the killing fields." Griffith stated it was the worst ever because unlike in other humanitarian crises, the people of Gaza had nowhere to flee. On November 8, UN Human Rights chief Volker Türk described the Rafah Crossing as "gates to a living nightmare."

On 28 November, UN chief António Guterres stated, the "humanitarian catastrophe in Gaza is getting worse by the day." On 3 December, WHO secretary-general Tedros Adhanom Ghebreyesus visited Nasser Medical Complex, stating, "Patients were receiving care on the floor, screaming in pain... I cannot find words strong enough to express our concern over what we’re witnessing." On 6 December, UN chief António Guterres invoked Article 99 of the Charter of the United Nations, stating “We are facing a severe risk of collapse of the humanitarian system." A joint statement by more than 20 UN and humanitarian organizations described the crisis as "amongst the worst we have witnessed".

On 8 December, UNICEF spokesperson Thomas White stated, "Civil order is breaking down in Gaza... Society is on the brink of full-blown collapse." Philippe Lazzarini stated, "By any description, it is definitely the worst situation I have ever seen." On 11 December, a UN envoy toured Gaza, leading Ecuador's representative to state, "The reality is even worse than what words can speak." On 13 December, UN human rights chief Volker Türk stated the crisis was "well beyond breakdown." On 19 December, James Elder, spokesperson of UNICEF said "I'm furious that children who are recovering from amputations in hospitals are then killed in those hospitals."

Barbara Woodward, the British ambassador to the UN, stated many more would die from violence, disease, and famine if action wasn't taken to ease the humanitarian crisis. On 31 December, a UNOCHA official stated she was afraid casualties were going to increase exponentially due to "conditions which are literally unbelievable". On 5 January 2024, the United Nations humanitarian chief Martin Griffiths stated, "People are facing the highest levels of food insecurity ever recorded." On 7 January, the UNRWA deputy director reported severe hunger and an almost collapsed healthcare system, stating, "I don't know how much more they can bear before something explodes in the southern part of Gaza".

On 7 January, UN chief Antonio Guterres stated "widespread famine looms" in Gaza, to which the UN special rapporteur for health Tlaleng Mofokeng stated Gaza was experiencing "deliberate starvation not famine". Speaking at the United Nations Security Council on 12 January, Martin Griffiths stated colleagues who had made it into northern Gaza in recent days had described "scenes of utter horror: Corpses left lying in the road. People with evident signs of starvation stopping trucks in search of anything they can get to survive." The World Food Programme stated nine out of ten people in northern Gaza were eating less than a meal a day. UNGA president Dennis Francis asked, "How much is enough?"

On 20 January, Antonio Guterres stated, "People in Gaza are dying not only from bombs and bullets, but from lack of food & clean water, and hospitals without power & medicine." On 27 January, Martin Griffiths stated, "The people of Gaza have been enduring unthinkable horrors and deprivation for close to four months. Their needs have never been higher." On 30 January, the UN Security Council issued a statement saying it was worried about the "dire and rapidly deteriorating humanitarian situation". On 7 February, Martin Griffiths stated, "More than half of Gaza’s population is now crammed in Rafah, a town of originally 250,000 people right on Egypt’s doorstep. Their living conditions are abysmal – they lack the basic necessities to survive, stalked by hunger, disease and death." On 10 February, António Guterres stated an Israeli assault on Rafah would "exponentially increase what is already a humanitarian nightmare". On 21 February, Tedros Adhanom Ghebreyesus stated the situation in Gaza was inhumane and described it as a death zone.

On 5 March, UNRWA chief Philippe Lazzarini stated, "Despite all the horrors that Gazans have lived through – and that we have watched – the worst might be yet to come." On 15 March, a representative from the United Nations Population Fund called the humanitarian crisis in northern Gaza a "nightmare". James Elder, a UNICEF official, stated, "The depth of the horror surpasses our ability to describe it," saying that he had seen "skeletal" children in Gaza, the "utter annihilation" of the Strip, and that "Khan Younis, Gaza City barely exist any more". In late-March, António Guterres stated the situation in Gaza was a "non-stop nightmare. Communities obliterated. Homes demolished. Entire families and generations wiped out."

On 22 August, The UN declared a full-blown famine in Gaza, with over half a million people facing starvation, destitution, and preventable deaths. Turkey First Lady Emine Erdoğan appealed to Melania Trump for intervention, and another Palestinian journalist was killed by Israeli fire. Protests in Israel demanded a ceasefire, amid mounting pressure on the Netanyahu government.

=== Israeli ===
Israeli Major General (ret.) Giora Eiland compared Israel's situation to that of the United States after Pearl Harbor. He argued that if Israel wanted to disarm Hamas, it had "no choice" but to make Gaza a place "that is temporarily or permanently impossible to live in". This, he stated, was not a "program for revenge", but a way to get the hostages back. In an op-ed in Yedioth Ahronoth on 19 November, Eiland wrote Israel should not adopt a US narrative that "allows" Israel to only fight against militants. Writing for Haaretz, Zvi Bar'el argued the humanitarian crisis was an Israeli military weapon that could be used as a bargaining chip. In a speech posted by the Knesset Channel, MK Tally Gotliv stated, "Without hunger and thirst among the Gazan population, we will not be able to recruit collaborators".

Ghassan Alian, the head of COGAT, stated, "Human animals are dealt with accordingly. Israel has imposed a total blockade on Gaza, no electricity, no water, just damage. You wanted hell, you will get hell." In January 2024, a COGAT representative denied there was a famine in Gaza, stating, "Don't forget that this is an Arab, Gazan population whose DNA is to hoard, certainly when it comes to food." Netanyahu stated Israel was allowing in the absolute "minimum" amount of aid into Gaza and claimed this was preventing a humanitarian crisis.

In May 2025, the Knesset held a discussion on the impact of the humanitarian crisis on Israeli public relations. Likud MP Amit Halevi disagreed with a doctor who said that suffering Palestinian children should be able to receive medical treatment. Halevi claimed, "When fighting a group like this, the distinctions that exist in a normal world don't exist." MP Limor Son Har-Melech argued, "No one is starving anyone – stop echoing Hamas lies!" The discussion also featured Tsav 9 founder Rashel Twito falsely claiming that blocking humanitarian aid to Gaza led to hostage releases.

A May 2025 poll by the Institute for National Security Studies found that 64.5% of Israelis were unconcerned with the humanitarian and aid situation in Gaza. A June poll by the Hebrew University of Jerusalem found that 64% of Israelis saw no need for additional coverage of Gazan civilians, and a plurality of 41% thought that Israeli news channels Channel 12 and Channel 13 were biased in favor of the civilians.

=== Palestinian ===
On 4 January 2024, Gaza City mayor Yahya Al-Sarraj made an urgent appeal to the international community for fuel "to provide the necessary support mechanisms to provide water, sanitation and hygiene services to serve all residents of the Gaza Strip". On 5 January, the Palestinian Foreign Ministry stated the humanitarian crisis in Rafah was straining the international community's credibility, stating, "The Israeli government continues its deepening campaign of genocide, comprehensive destruction, and displacement in the Gaza Strip". On 14 January, the Foreign Ministry stated, "The Israeli occupation has turned Gaza into an uninhabitable place, committed horrific crimes, and forcibly displaced approximately 2 million people". The Ministry stated Israel was claiming self-defense to justify making Gaza uninhabitable.

=== United States ===
Ten days into the war, the United States UN representative Linda Thomas-Greenfield vetoed a UN Security Council resolution that would have condemned all violence against civilians in the war and urged humanitarian aid to Gaza. She said it was too early to craft a resolution while diplomacy was underway and criticized the one proposed for not mentioning Israel's right to self-defense. In a Wall Street Journal op-ed, conservative American commentator Daniel Henninger speculated Hamas wanted to create a humanitarian crisis for publicity purposes.

US Vice-President Kamala Harris said on 2 December that "too many innocent Palestinians have been killed" and that "international humanitarian law must be respected". She said that at the end of the conflict there must be "No forcible displacement, no reoccupation, no siege or blockade, no reduction in territory, and no use of Gaza as a platform for terrorism". Ten days later, US President Biden warned that Israel was losing international support because of its "indiscriminate bombing" of Gaza.

In early March 2024, the United States began airdrops of humanitarian aid into Gaza. Following an incident in which an airdrop of aid killed 5 Gazans and injured several others, the US Central Command and an unnamed U.S. official on 8 March rejected reports that their airdrops were to blame. The US also began work on opening a 'maritime aid corridor' and building the Gaza floating pier so aid could be delivered by sea. On 4 March, US Vice-President Harris called for "an immediate ceasefire" because of "the immense scale of suffering in Gaza". She said Israel must let more aid into Gaza and was imposing "unnecessary restrictions". US Senator Chris Van Hollen had said that "political decisions by the Netanyahu coalition" were delaying the delivery of aid into Gaza.

The US put forward a draft UN Security Council resolution which stated the "imperative" for "an immediate and sustained ceasefire", facilitating aid delivery, and supporting ongoing talks between Israel and Hamas, linked to the release of hostages. On 22 March it was vetoed by Russia and China. On 25 March, the US abstained on a UN Security Council ceasefire resolution, allowing it to pass. On 26 March, the U.S. Secretary of Defense called the situation in Gaza a "human catastrophe".

US Republican Congressman and former aide to Donald Trump, Max Miller, speaking at Fox News stated that Palestine is "about to get eviscerated... to turn that into a parking lot." He has previously called on the Biden administration "to get out of Israel's way and to let Israel do what it needs to do best". He said there should be "no rules of engagement" during Israel's bombardment of Gaza. Miller also questioned the accuracy of the Gaza Health Ministry's claim that 10,000 people have been killed in Gaza, saying that he believes many of those killed have been "Hamas terrorists", not innocent civilians, and said the United States does not "trust an entity that puts munitions in mosques, and churches and in hospitals."

Former Republican Representative Michele Bachmann appearing in December in The Charlie Kirk Show stated "So, it's time that Gaza ends. The two million people who live there – they are clever assassins. They need to be removed from that land. That land needs to be turned into a national park. And since they're the voluntary mercenaries for Iran, they need to be dropped on the doorstep of Iran. Let Iran deal with those people." She received a round of applause from the audience, while Kirk replied "I look at Israel and Israel says we never want another person into our country that doesn't share our values," Kirk said. "They said they don't want refugees. They don't want any of these people. I want American immigration policy to be like that."

Republican Representative, Brian Mast, compared all Palestinians to Nazis in November on the House floor. On January 31, 2024, Mast also said that Palestinian babies are not innocent civilians but "terrorists" who should be killed, that more infrastructure in Gaza needs to be destroyed, and that "It would be better if you kill all the terrorists and kill everyone who are supporters."

In an interview with Fox News on March 5, 2024, the former president and presumptive Republican presidential candidate Donald Trump stated that Joe Biden "dumped Israel" due to being overly influenced by pro-Palestinian protests, that "The Democrats are very bad for Israel," that he supports Israel’s ongoing offensive on Gaza in which Israel has to "finish the problem", and that the Biden administration "got soft", which commentators has viewed as a call to continue and "double down" on genocidal acts. Trump's campaign also said that, if elected again, he would bar Gaza residents from entering the U.S. as part of an expanded travel ban.

In a town hall meeting on March 25, 2024, the Republican US House representative Tim Walberg of Michigan stated that Palestinian civilians should have nuclear weapons used against them, "like Nagasaki and Hiroshima" (the Japanese cities where the US dropped atomic bombs at the end of World War Two, killing hundreds of thousands of people) in order to "Get it over quick."

A group of eight Democrat Senators led by Bernie Sanders, Jeff Merkley, and Chris Van Hollen issued an official letter to President Joe Biden, calling on him to "enforce federal law" by requiring Israel's Prime Minister Benjamin Netanyahu "to stop restricting humanitarian aid access to Gaza or forfeit U.S. military aid to Israel" as "The severe humanitarian catastrophe unfolding in Gaza is nearly unprecedented in modern history" and "The United States should not provide military assistance to any country that interferes with U.S. humanitarian assistance." They cited the 1961 Foreign Assistance Act, which states that "no assistance" shall be provided under that law or the Arms Export Control Act to any country that restricts, directly or indirectly, the transport or delivery of U.S. humanitarian assistance. "Stopping American humanitarian aid is in violation of the law. That should be clear. No more money to Netanyahu's war machine to kill Palestinian children," Sanders said.

=== Other states ===
On 8 January 2024, Jordanian foreign minister Ayman Safadi condemned Israel's actions in Gaza, stating, "The Israeli aggression on Gaza has exceeded all humanitarian, legal and moral limits".

On 9 January 2024, British Foreign Secretary David Cameron admitted he is "worried" that Israel has "taken action that might be in breach of international law", saying he wanted Israel to restore water supplies to Gaza. Cameron stated on 26 January, "The scale of suffering in Gaza is unimaginable". Sarah Champion, a Labor MP, stated, "I find it utterly wicked and immoral that international conventions [in Gaza] are not being respected, particularly when it comes to medical facilities". Chinese foreign minister Wang Yi stated, "We cannot allow this humanitarian disaster to continue", and described it as "a tragedy for humankind and a disgrace for civilization". Yousef Al Otaiba, the UAE ambassador to the United States, called for a ceasefire, writing, "Half of the people are starving. The medical system has collapsed. Safe water is scarce. An impending Israeli offensive will displace millions."

Speaking about Rafah, a German government spokesperson stated on 19 February 2024 that although the full scope of the crisis was difficult to assess, "Everyone recognizes that it is catastrophic." William, Prince of Wales stated, "There is a desperate need for increased humanitarian support to Gaza." On 3 March, France’s Foreign Minister Stéphane Séjourné stated, "The humanitarian situation in Gaza has been catastrophic for several weeks, if not several months. And this is creating indefensible and unjustifiable situations for which the Israelis are accountable". On 26 March, the German foreign minister Anna Baerbock stated, "The humanitarian situation in Gaza is hell".

=== Resolution efforts ===
In a call on 20 November, Chinese President Xi Jinping and French President Emmanuel Macron discussed measures to avoid the humanitarian crisis from getting worse. In Riyadh, Saudi Arabia on November 11, 2023, the Organisation of Islamic Cooperation and the Arab League held an emergency meeting on the Gaza humanitarian crisis created by the war. On 5 December, Cyprus President Nikos Christodoulides visited Egypt and Jordan in attempt to establish a humanitarian aid corridor to Gaza. The UN appointed Sigrid Kaag in the newly created position of senior humanitarian and reconstruction coordinator for Gaza.

On December 6, United Nations secretary-general António Guterres invoked Article 99 of the UN Charter, that is: "The Secretary-General may bring to the attention of the Security Council any matter which in his opinion may threaten the maintenance of international peace and security." Guterres cited the situation as a threat to "international peace and security" and "a severe risk of collapse of the humanitarian system" which he argued have irreversible impacts for Palestinians. By invoking Article 99, Guterres is pushing the Security Council to call for a cease fire.

=== Refugees ===
At the beginning of the war, Egypt announced it was closing the Rafah Crossing to Gaza, one of only three exit points along the Gaza border. Egypt cited fears about permanent displacement and a possible refugee crisis, particularly if Israel refused to allow the refugees back into Gaza after the war. (Note: On 2 November, Egypt said it would allow 7,000 dual citizens to exit through the Rafah border crossing.) Israeli PM Benjamin Netanyahu sought to convince Egypt to accept Gazan refugees.

Jordan also expressed reluctance to receive Palestinian refugees. King Abdullah II of Jordan warned Israel against pushing Palestinians into Jordan, emphasizing the need to address the humanitarian situation within both Gaza and the West Bank.

In Europe, Humza Yousaf, the First Minister of Scotland, urged the international community to establish a refugee program for Gaza. Yousaf stated Scotland was ready to offer sanctuary to refugees, and called on the UK to create a resettlement scheme. (Note: Yousaf also called on Israel not to resort to collective punishment and emphasized the need for medical evacuation support for injured civilians. Yousaf has personal ties to Gaza, with family members there. He stressed unity and safety for all communities in Scotland. The UK government, led by conservative Rishi Sunak, did not issue an official response to Yousaf's comments.) Foreign Minister Hanke Bruins Slot stated the Netherlands was discussing the possibility of accepting sick and wounded Palestinian children into the country.

In the US, left-wing politicians, including Representatives Alexandria Ocasio-Cortez and Jamaal Bowman, called for the acceptance of Gazan refugees. Right-wing politicians, such as former-President Donald Trump and Governor Ron DeSantis, both argued for barring admittance of any refugees from Gaza. Former US ambassador to the UN, Nikki Haley, said that Palestinian refugees from Gaza should be accepted by Middle Eastern countries.

== See also ==
- 2024 Gaza Strip polio epidemic
- Audience cost
- Casualties of the Gaza war
- Collective punishment
- Deficiency (medicine)
- Dehydration
- Emaciation
- Famine
- Israeli blockade of aid delivery to the Gaza Strip
- Israeli blockade of the Gaza Strip (2023–present)
- Gaza floating pier
- Gaza genocide
- Humanitarian aid during the Gaza war
- Human right to water and sanitation
- Hunger
- International aid to Palestinians
- Israeli blockade of aid delivery to the Gaza Strip
- Malnutrition
- Muscle atrophy
- Outline of the Gaza war
- Palestinian genocide accusation
- Persecution
- Protracted social conflict
- Attacks on refugee camps in the Gaza war
- Starvation (crime)
- Terminal dehydration
- War crimes in the Gaza war
- Timeline of the Yemeni humanitarian crisis
- Winter of 2024–25 in the Gaza Strip
- World food crises (2022–present)
- Media coverage of the Israeli–Palestinian conflict

== Bibliography ==
- Albanese, Francesca (25 March 2024). Anatomy of a Genocide: Report of the Special Rapporteur on the situation of human rights in the Palestinian territories occupied since 1967, Francesca Albanese (PDF) (Report). United Nations Special Rapporteur on the occupied Palestinian territories.
- Amnesty International (2024). 'You Feel Like You Are Subhuman': Israel's Genocide Against Palestinians In Gaza (PDF) (Report). Archived (PDF) from the original on 5 December 2024.
- Baker, Graeme (13 November 2023). "Israel Gaza: Hospitals caught on front line of war". BBC News. Archived from the original on 28 February 2024.
- Basu, Brishti (1 November 2023). "Dwindling supplies, damaged hospitals in Gaza prompt growing calls for aid, ceasefire". CBC. Archived from the original on 5 February 2024.
- Benson, Chris (12 March 2024). "Bernie Sanders leads Democrats in call for Joe Biden to ensure aid reaches Gaza". United Press International.
- Bolton, Alexander (12 March 2024). "Democratic senators demand Biden halt military aid to Israel". The Hill. Archived from the original on 12 March 2024.
- B'Tselem (July 2025). Our Genocide (PDF) (Report).
- Burke, Jason (11 November 2023). "Israeli troops in key battle with Hamas gunmen near Gaza City hospital". The Observer. Archived from the original on 17 November 2023.
- Cooper, Helene; Schmitt, Eric; Goldman, Adam (9 November 2023). "Israeli Forces Have Limited Time in Gaza, U.S. Officials Say". The New York Times. ISSN 0362-4331. Archived from the original on 9 November 2023.
- Cormack, Lucy (14 October 2023). "Booby traps, mines: Hamas' tunnel network under Gaza helps in a war". The Sydney Morning Herald. Archived from the original on 8 November 2023.
- De Vogli, Roberto; Montomoli, Jonathan; Abu-Sittah, Ghassan; Pappé, Ilan (2025). "Break the selective silence on the genocide in Gaza". The Lancet. 406 (10504). Supplementary appendix pp. 3–4. doi:10.1016/S0140-6736(25)01541-7. PMID 40752501.
- Debre, Isabel (11 November 2023). "Hospitals have special protection under the rules of war. Why are they in the crosshairs in Gaza?". Associated Press. Archived from the original on 23 February 2024.
- Dumper, Michael; Badran, Amneh (2024). Dumper, Michael; Badran, Amneh (eds.). Routledge Handbook on Palestine (1st ed.). Routledge. doi:10.4324/9781003031994. ISBN 978-1-003-03199-4.
- Green, Mark A. (7 November 2023). "Hamas and the Gazan Tunnels". Wilson Center. Archived from the original on 8 November 2023.
- Hillyard, Vaughn; Smith, Allan (5 March 2024). "Trump breaks silence on Israel's military campaign in Gaza: 'Finish the problem'". NBC News. Archived from the original on 6 August 2024.
- Houghtaling, Ellie Quinlan (12 March 2024). "Democratic Senators Urge Biden to Stop Arming Israel". The New Republic. Archived from the original on 31 July 2024.
- Iordache, Ruxandra (14 November 2023). "Human Rights Watch calls for investigation into Israeli hostilities against Gaza Strip hospitals". NBC News. Archived from the original on 14 November 2023.
- Jimison, Robert (12 March 2024). "Senators Urge Biden to Stop Arming Israel, Citing Violation of U.S. Aid Law". The New York Times. Archived from the original on 14 July 2024.
- Johnson, Jake (7 March 2024). ""Finish the problem": Trump's answer on Gaza shows he's "even worse" than Biden on Israel". Salon.com. Archived from the original on 27 July 2024.
- Kekatos, Mary; Beaule, Victoria (10 November 2023). "Hospitals in Gaza say they are under attack and running out of fuel for ICU patients". ABC News. Archived from the original on 1 March 2024.
- Kumar, Nikhil (1 December 2023). "Five Premature Babies Found Dead, 'Partly Decomposed' in Gaza City Hospital: Report". The Messenger. Archived from the original on 6 January 2024.
- Leonhardt, David; Jackson, Lauren (30 October 2023). "Gaza's Vital Tunnels". The New York Times. ISSN 0362-4331. Archived from the original on 5 November 2023.
- Ledwidge, Frank (8 November 2023). "Decoding the underground: Israel's tactical war on Hamas tunnels". DW News (Interview). Interviewed by Terry Martin. Archived from the original on 9 November 2023.
- Linder, Ronnie (9 November 2023). "מלכודת שיפא: האתגר הכי גדול של ישראל במלחמה" [The Shifa trap: Israel's biggest challenge in the war]. Haaretz (in Hebrew). Archived from the original on 10 November 2023.
- McCann Ramirez, Nikki (5 March 2024). "Trump Backs Israel Bombarding Gaza: 'Gotta Finish the Problem'". RollingStone. Archived from the original on 6 March 2024.
- Michaelson, Ruth (13 November 2023). "'In the circle of death': Gaza doctors say patients are under siege in al-Shifa". The Guardian. Archived from the original on 16 November 2023.
- Mohyeldin, Ayman; Hamdan, Basel (10 December 2024). "Why Amnesty International and other experts say Israel is committing genocide in Gaza". MSNBC. Archived from the original on 3 July 2025.
- Narea, Nicole (25 October 2024). "Is Israel committing genocide? Reexamining the question, a year later". Vox.
- Nuki, Paul (7 November 2023). "Hamas terrorists' last stand at Gaza hospital". The Daily Telegraph. ISSN 0307-1235. Archived from the original on 8 November 2023.
- Picheta, Rob; Khadder, Kareem; Rebane, Teele; Zabadne, Zohair (10 November 2023). "Gaza hospital 'surrounded by tanks' as other healthcare facilities say they've been damaged by Israeli strikes". CNN. Archived from the original on 13 January 2024.
- Romo, Vanessa (16 November 2023). "Doctors are among the many dead in Gaza. These are their stories". NPR. Archived from the original on 27 February 2024.
- Rosenberg, Mattew (12 November 2023). "Israeli Forces Near a Struggling Hospital They Say Covers a Hamas Complex". The New York Times. Archived from the original on 16 November 2023.
- Roskin, Joel (30 October 2023). "Geologist shares analysis of Hamas's use of underground tunnels with NHK" (Interview). Archived from the original on 8 November 2023.
- Russell, Lauren (3 December 2023). "Gaza: Decomposing bodies of babies 'seen in footage' from abandoned children's hospital". Sky News. Archived from the original on 23 December 2023.
- Sabry, Muhammed (24 October 2023). "Gaza hospitals in 'total collapse,' says Health Ministry". Anadolu Agency. Archived from the original on 25 October 2023.
- Saric, Ivana (10 March 2024). "Sanders: U.S. putting conditions on aid for Israel would be "the right thing to do"". Axios. Archived from the original on 10 March 2024.
- Samuels, Ben (17 March 2024). "Trump Says He Would Let Netanyahu Finish the Job in Gaza, Says 'Biden Is So Bad for Israel'". Haaretz. Archived from the original on 17 March 2024.
- Speri, Alice (20 December 2024). "Defining genocide: how a rift over Gaza sparked a crisis among scholars". Guardian. Archived from the original on 20 December 2024.
- Stepansky, Joseph (6 November 2023). "Qatar rejects Israeli claims of tunnel network under Gaza hospital". Al Jazeera. Archived from the original on 18 November 2023.
- Stepansky, Joseph; Najjar, Farah (8 November 2023). "Israeli military says destroyed tunnel shaft near UNRWA school". Al Jazeera. Archived from the original on 18 November 2023.
- Tapper, Jake (13 November 2023). "Hamas has command center under Al-Shifa hospital, US official says". CNN. Archived from the original on 13 November 2023.
- Tharoor, Ishaan (30 July 2025). "Leading genocide scholars see a genocide happening in Gaza". The Washington Post.
- Traverso, Enzo (2024). Gaza Faces History. Other Press. ISBN 978-1-63542-555-0.
- van Laarhoven, Kasper; Peek, Eva; Walters, Derk (14 May 2025). "Zeven gerenommeerde wetenschappers vrijwel eensgezind: Israël pleegt in Gaza genocide". NRC (in Dutch). Archived from the original on 15 May 2025.
- Walker, Chris (6 March 2024). "Trump Encourages Genocide Against Palestinians, Saying: "Finish the Problem"". Truthout. Archived from the original on 8 March 2024.
- Weiss, Debbie (7 November 2023). "'Fauda' Creator: 'We Cannot Even Imagine' Extent of Gaza Terror Tunnels, Hamas Wanted IDF to Enter Enclave". The Algemeiner. Archived from the original on 8 November 2023.
