= Paltel Group =

Palestinian telecommunications company

Palestine Telecommunications Company (Paltel) شركة الاتصالات الفلسطينية
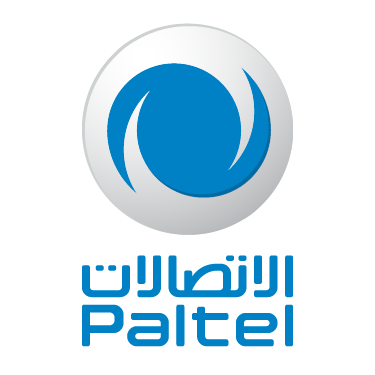
- Company type: Public
- Industry: Telecommunications
- Founded: 1995; 31 years ago
- Founder: Sabih Masri
- Headquarters: Ramallah, Palestine
- Area served: Palestine
- Key people: Sabih Masri (Chairman)
- Products: Fixed, GSM, GPRS, EDGE, SMS, MMS, ISP, Fiber-optic communication
- Number of employees: 3,000
- Parent: Paltel Group
- Subsidiaries: Paltel, Jawwal, Reach
- Website: paltelgroup.ps

Palestine Telecommunications Company (commonly known as Paltel) (Arabic: شركة الاتصالات الفلسطينية), listed in the Palestine Exchange (PEX) as Paltel, is a Palestinian telecommunications holding company based in Ramallah, Palestine. It consists of Palestine Telecommunications Company (known as Paltel), and Palestine Cellular Communications Company (known as Jawwal), internet provider Hadara, Reach call center, and Palmedia broadcast media.

Founded in 1995, today Paltel stands as one of the largest employers in Palestine. It is one of the largest telecommunication companies of the territory alongside Ooredoo Palestine and Jawwal, which is a subsidiary of Paltel itself. The company have more than 3,000 employees in the West Bank and Gaza Strip. Paltel's net earnings have grown from $12.1 million in 2000 to $120 million in 2014.

== History ==
Paltel, established in 1995, became Palestine's leading telecommunications provider. Jawwal, its cellular network, launched in 1999 and grew rapidly, reaching millions of subscribers. The company expanded into Gaza in 2011, introduced 3G services in 2015, and launched Palestine’s first data center in 2019. In 2022, Jawwal introduced high-speed fiber internet and partnered with Arab Bank in 2023 to create the first neo bank in Palestine.

== Services and products ==
=== Palmedia ===
Palmedia for Multimedia Services Company is the media arm of Paltel. Based in Ramallah, it provides media broadcast services and production services to media outlets such as Russia Today, the BBC, Al-Mayadeen, Al-Manar, and Hamas-affiliated Al-Quds TV, Al-Aqsa TV, and Palestine Today.

In July 2017, the Israeli military raided Palmedia's offices in Ramallah on suspicion of "incitement to terrorism." Their offices throughout the West Bank were raided again in October 2017 because of their provision of production services to Hamas-affiliated media outlets Al-Quds, Al-Aqsa, and Palestine Today.

=== Products ===
- Fixed telephony
- Global System for Mobile
- General Packet Radio Service (GPRS)
- EDGE
- SMS
- MMS
- ISP
- Fiber-optic communication

== See also ==
- Jawwal
