= Jawwal =

Palestinian communications company

Palestine Cellular Communications Company (Jawwal) شركة الاتصالات الخلوية الفلسطينية (جوال)
- Company type: Public Shareholding Co. Ltd
- Industry: Telecommunications
- Headquarters: Ramallah, Palestine
- Area served: Palestine
- Products: GSM, GPRS, EDGE, SMS, MMS, ISP, UMTS, HSDPA, HSPA+
- Number of employees: 250
- Parent: Paltel
- Website: www.jawwal.ps

Palestine Cellular Communications Company (Arabic: شركة الاتصالات الخلوية الفلسطينية), trading as Jawwal (Arabic: جوال), is a Palestinian communications company providing cellular and wireless communications. Jawwal operates in the West Bank and Gaza Strip as part of Paltel Group.

== History ==
Jawwal was established in 1999 and obtained the first mobile license in the Palestinian territories, operating with GSM communications. The service first launched in Gaza on August 15, 1999 and then to the West Bank on October 2 the same year.

== Network ==
Jawwal has struggled with the limited frequency allocated to Jawwal by the Israeli authorities. Jawwal started offering 3G services commercially on 23 January 2018. 4G LTE and 5G services are unavailable.

Frequencies used on the Jawwal network
Frequency	Band number	Protocol	Class	Notes
900 MHz	8	GSM/GPRS/EDGE	2G	
2100 MHz	1	UMTS/HSPA/HSPA+	3G	
