= Gaza Strip famine =

Famine during the Gaza war

Gaza Strip famine تجويع قطاع غزة
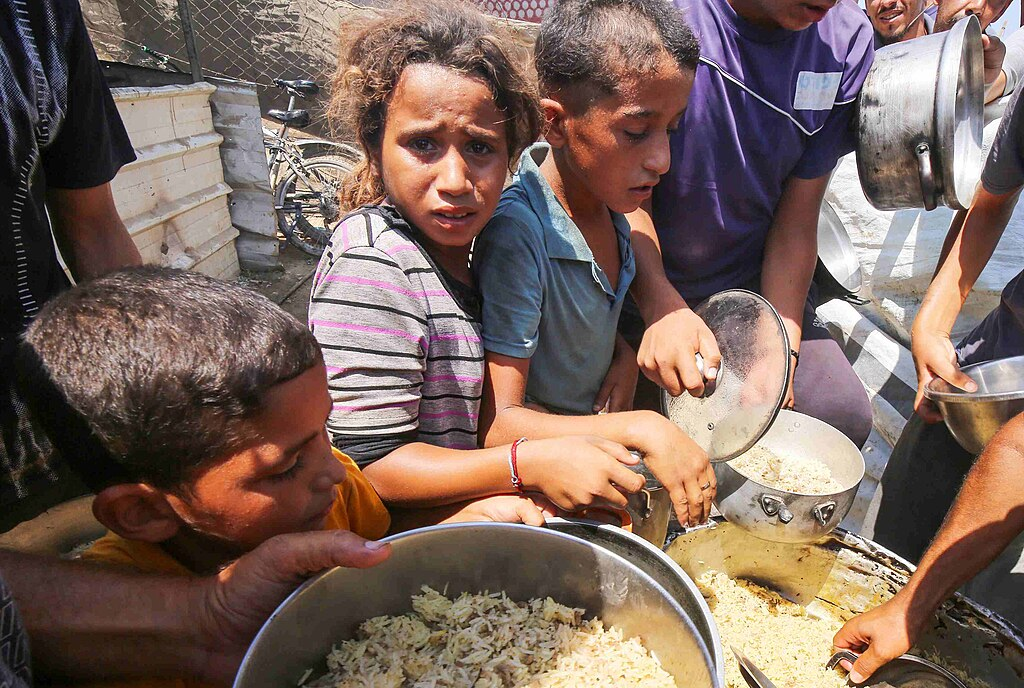
- Displaced Palestinians in Deir al-Balah line up to receive food provided by charitable organizations (August 2024).
- Country: Palestine
- Location: Gaza Strip
- Total deaths: 440+ (reported by GHM as of 21 September 2025) (Note: The total number of deaths from malnutrition and starvation reported by the Gaza Health Ministry was 440 as of 10 September, including 147 children.)
- Causes: Gaza war and genocide (including war, humanitarian aid blockade, destruction of food and water infrastructure, looting, aid site killings)
- Relief: Humanitarian aid
- Consequences: The International Court of Justice orders Israel to increase aid to Gaza; International Criminal Court arrest warrants for Israeli leaders for the use of starvation as a method of warfare.
- Food insecurity (July 2026): Over 1.2 million people in IPC Phase 3 (Crisis) or above, including 212,000 in Phase 4 (Emergency)

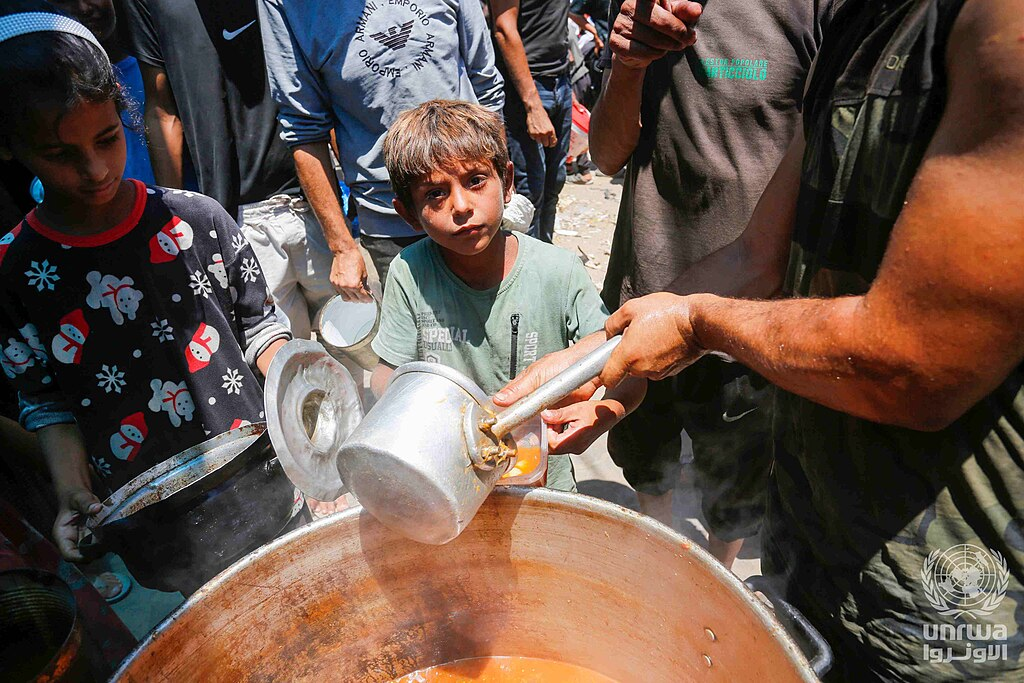
Displaced Palestinians gather to receive food from a charity in Deir al-Balah, Gaza Strip (June 2024).

The population of the Gaza Strip underwent a famine as a result of an Israeli blockade during the Gaza war between 22 August 2025 and 19 December 2025. The prevention of basic essentials and humanitarian aid from entering Gaza, as well as airstrikes that destroyed food infrastructure, such as bakeries, mills, and food stores, caused a widespread scarcity of essential supplies. (Note: According to B'Tselem, the famine risk is a direct outcome of Israeli policy: "This reality is not a byproduct of war, but a direct result of Israel's declared policy. Residents now depend entirely on food supplies from outside Gaza, as they can no longer produce almost any food themselves. Most cultivated fields have been destroyed, and accessing open areas during the war is dangerous in any case. Bakeries, factories and food warehouses have been bombed or shut down due to lack of basic supplies, fuel and electricity.") Humanitarian aid was also blocked by protests at borders and ports. Increasing societal breakdown in Gaza, including looting, was also cited as a barrier to the provision of aid.

By August 2025, Integrated Food Security Phase Classification (IPC) projections showed that 100% of the population are experiencing "high levels of acute food insecurity", and 32% were projected to face Phase 5 catastrophic levels by 30 September 2025. On 22 August 2025, the IPC said that famine is taking place in at least one of the five governorates in the Gaza Strip: specifically, the Gaza Governorate which includes Gaza City. The IPC added that, within the next month, famine was likely to also occur in both the Deir al-Balah Governorate and the Khan Yunis Governorate. The IPC had insufficient data on the North Gaza Governorate for a classification but concluded that conditions were likely similar or worse than in the Gaza Governorate. Within the next 6 weeks as of 16 August, the number of people in IPC Phase 5 was expected to rise from 500,000 to over 640,000.

On 22 October 2025, the International Court of Justice found that Israel is obliged to guarantee sufficient food to Gazans and to allow UNRWA to operate in Gaza. On 19 December, the IPC published a report declaring that there is no longer a famine in Gaza after improvements in food delivery following the ceasefire, but warned that the situation remains "highly fragile" with 100,000 still facing "catastrophic conditions", although that number was projected to decline to 1,900 by April 2026. As of January 2026, Gazans have received enough humanitarian aid to meet their basic food needs for the first time since the start of the war.

However, in late July 2026, the IPC reported that the scale-up of humanitarian assistance, enabled by the October 2025 ceasefire, has driven improvements in food security and nutrition conditions across Gaza, but that over 1.2 million people (59% of the population of Gaza) continued to face Phase 3 Crisis levels of food insecurity or worse, including 212,000 (about 10% of Gazans) experiencing Phase 4 Emergency levels, and warned that Gaza is still experiencing a severe food emergency that could develop into another famine.

== Before the Gaza war ==
Map of the Gaza Strip with Israeli/Egyptian-controlled borders and limited fishing zone as of April 2019.

Israel imposed restrictions on movement and goods in the Gaza Strip since the early 1990s. After Hamas took over in 2007, Israel significantly intensified existing movement restrictions and imposed a blockade on the movement of goods and people in and out of the Gaza Strip.

Rhoda Howard-Hassmann argued in 2016 that "thoroughly planned impoverishment" has been a long-term policy of Israel for the Gaza Strip. According to Sara Roy, a leading expert on the Gazan economy,

The current desecration of Gaza is the latest stage in a process that has taken increasingly violent forms over time. In the fifty-six years since it occupied the Strip in 1967, Israel has transformed Gaza from a territory politically and economically integrated with Israel and the West Bank into an isolated enclave, from a functional economy to a dysfunctional one, from a productive society to an impoverished one. It has likewise removed Gaza's residents from the sphere of politics, transforming them from a people with a nationalist claim to a population whose majority requires some form of humanitarian aid to sustain themselves.

In the early 2000s, the Gaza Strip witnessed a period of increasing tensions that had a profound impact on its economic and agricultural sectors. During this time, a relatively small number of Israeli settlers lived in the Gaza Strip, yet they controlled a significant portion of the territory's valuable resources. Settlers had access to about 25% of the Strip, an area that included 40% of Gaza's arable land, as well as a substantial share of its water resources, limiting the availability of land and water for the Palestinian population. After Israel withdrew its settlements from the Gaza Strip in 2005, Palestinian elections were held in 2006, which Hamas won. In response to the election results, Israel designated the governing party and the Gaza Strip as a "hostile entity", implementing a blockade along with economic sanctions and restrictions. As a part of the blockade Israel imposed restrictions on imports of cooking fuel and gas into Gaza. Lists of restrictions were generated based on what Israel defines as 'dual use' goods, items that might be put to military uses threatening Israel's security. These measures are contested internationally and criticized for exacerbating economic and living conditions in Gaza.

Prior to the blockade, Gaza's population stood at 1.6 million, serviced by 400 trucks carrying goods into the Strip every day. Under the new policy, according to the Israeli NGO Gisha, Israel proposed to permit only 106 trucks entry to deliver goods. In the following decades, the number of humanitarian trucks permitted to enter Gaza varied, depending on several factors such as the political situation, security issues, agreements between Israel and Palestinian authorities, and interventions by international organizations. To obtain permission to import any commodity into the Strip, proof had to be supplied that they were indispensable, often causing delays and complications in the supply of humanitarian aid. Under Netanyahu's second premiership, Israel sporadically allowed more humanitarian aid, but tightened it during conflicts with Hamas and Palestinian Islamic Jihad. The blockade was maintained to secure de facto control over Gaza, along with limited economic assistance and humanitarian aid to prevent Israeli reoccupation.

Precise calculations were made to determine the minimum calorific requirement to avoid malnutrition in the Gaza Strip, and these formed the basis for Israel's determination of the truck numbers for food supplies from 2007 to 2010. Dov Weissglas, an advisor to the then Israeli PM Ehud Olmert, explained: "We have to make them much thinner, but not enough to die," the idea being "to put the Palestinians on a diet, but not to make them die of hunger." The calculation excluded factors such as the collapse of agriculture due to the blockade which dried up access to seed markets. (Note: The complicated procedures for obtaining clearances from Israel at the transit points also caused notable spoilage further reducing the food allowed in. Prospective import goods had to arrive in Israeli trucks, which were unloaded as the goods were transferred to 'neutral' trucks that then were allowed transit to the Gaza side. Once there, the consignments had to be unloaded from the neutral trucks and reloaded on Gazan trucks.)

Diplomatic cables subsequently published by WikiLeaks in 2011 revealed that Israel had informed the United States in 2008 that, while it would take measures to prevent a humanitarian crisis, it intended to keep Gaza's economy on the "brink of collapse". Gazans faced extreme poverty due to the blockade; in 2020, according to a report by Steven Devereux of the Institute of Development Studies (IDS), "more than half the residents of Gaza survived below the poverty line, two-thirds were food insecure, and three-quarters received international aid, either in cash or as food."

The Goldstone Report discovered that during the 2008–2009 Gaza War, Israel's invasion had caused deliberate and massive destruction of Gaza's agricultural sector. (Note: The agricultural sector, including crop farming, fisheries, livestock farming and poultry farming, suffered direct losses worth some US$170 million. Indirect losses have still to be definitively calculated. One business organization estimates that 60 per cent of all agricultural land had been destroyed, 40 per cent directly during the military operations. Moreover, 17 per cent of all orchards, 8.3 per cent of livestock, 2.6 per cent of poultry, 18.1 per cent of hatcheries, 25.6 per cent of beehives, 9.2 per cent of open fields and 13 per cent of groundwater wells were destroyed. Agriculture had already lost a third of its capacity since the start of the second intifada and the frequent Israeli incursions, according to NGO estimates used by UNDP-Gaza ... Some 250 agricultural wells were reportedly destroyed or severely damaged.) Israel also declared 30% of the most arable land in the Strip no-go zones. After 2012, the Red Cross secured an agreement to allow Gazan farmers to cultivate crops of various heights, in areas respectively at 300 metres to 1 kilometre from Israel's fortified border fence. Both cultivators and their rudimentary irrigation devices nonetheless were often exposed to sniping and automated machinegun fire, and crops along the armistice line were, without warning, sprayed with Monsanto's Roundup herbicide. Likewise, Israel placed severe restrictions on fishing within Gaza's waters—the 20 nautical miles agreed to under the Oslo Accords were unilaterally reduced to nine—with fishable areas demarcated with buoys. In 2009, Israel further reduced this to a 3-nautical-mile limit with the result that 85% of Gaza's fishing water was blocked by Israeli warships. Israeli gunships reportedly fired on local fishermen even within these areas.

In August 2023, it was reported that 12,076 truckloads of authorized goods entered Gaza, reflecting a slight improvement in the volume of goods allowed into the territory compared to previous periods. Despite these inflows, the volume of goods remained insufficient, given the 60% increase in population since 2007 and the escalating needs of the Gazan population.

The humanitarian impact of the blockade is compounded by recurrent hostilities, which not only result in high casualty rates but also further degrade Gaza's already fragile infrastructure. The United Nations and various human rights organizations have repeatedly called for the lifting of the blockade and for increased humanitarian access to alleviate the suffering of Gaza's residents. The situation in 2023, where the region has witnessed the highest number of fatalities since 2005, underscores the urgent need for a comprehensive and lasting solution to the humanitarian crisis in Gaza.

== Start of crisis ==
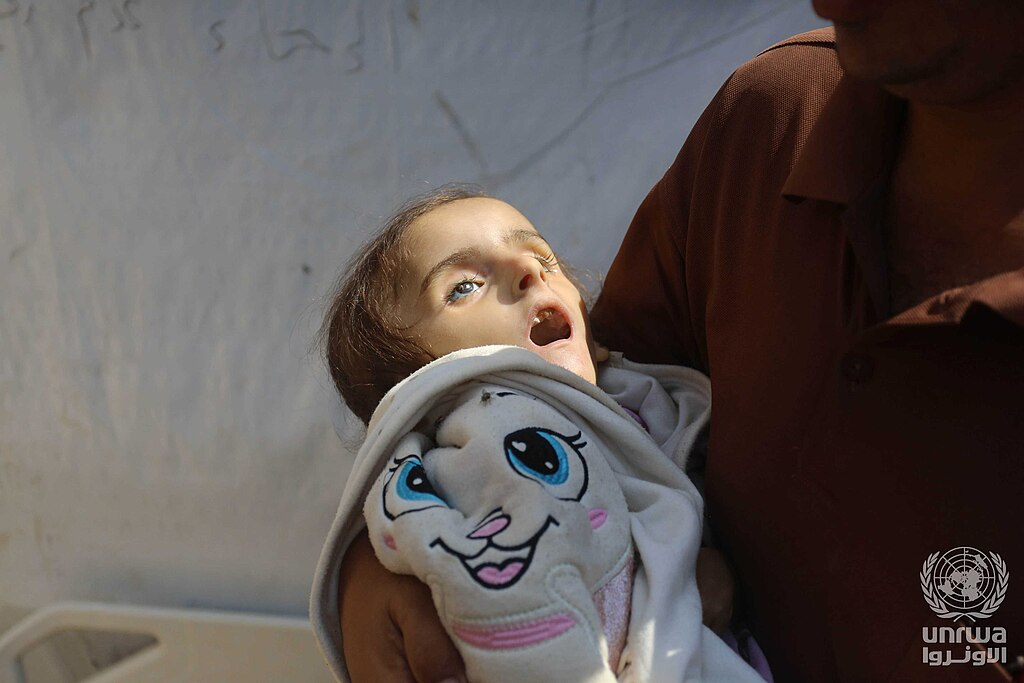
Four-year-old Palestinian girl who died from malnutrition and lack of treatment (August 2024).

External videos
- Emily "Cali" Callahan, an American nurse who worked in Gaza for Doctors Without Borders until early November, describes the humanitarian situation in Gaza to CNN's Anderson Cooper

Following the 7 October attack, Israel announced on 9 October 2023 that it was blocking the entry of food and water into Gaza. Because Gaza was already mostly reliant on food aid, the repercussions were felt immediately. On 18 October, Alia Zaki, a spokesperson for the WFP, stated that the population of Gaza was at risk of starvation. Three days later, the UN released a statement saying food stocks were nearly exhausted. By 23 October, Cindy McCain, executive director of the UN WFP, stated people were "literally starving to death as we speak".

On 27 October, a spokesperson for the WFP stated food and other basic supplies were running out. On 3 November, UN officials stated the average Gazan diet consisted of only two pieces of bread per day, and ActionAid stated more than half a million Gazans faced death by starvation. On 11 November, Corinne Fleischer, Middle East regional director of the WFP, stated, "hundreds of people are queueing for hours every day to get bread rations at bakeries," as people were being pushed "closer to starvation."

== Damage ==
=== Damage to infrastructure ===
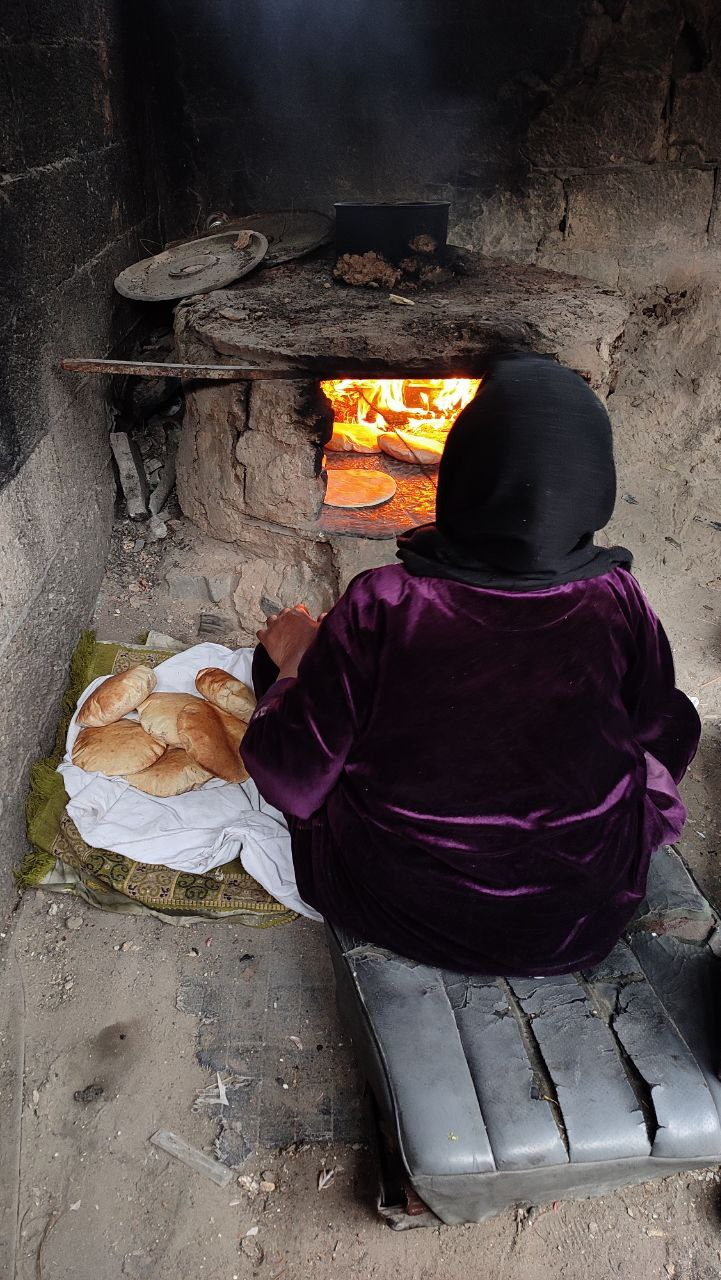
Baking bread during Gaza war, 1 March 2025

In 2023 and 2024, Israeli airstrikes severely impacted Gaza's food supply, targeting bakeries, agricultural land, and food infrastructure. The damage led to widespread closures and shortages, affecting access to bread, flour, and other food staples. Michael Fakhri, the U.N. Special Rapporteur on the Right to Food, has stated such actions amount to an Israeli "starvation campaign" waged by destroying Gaza's food system.

In October 2023, Israeli airstrikes targeted bakeries and agricultural sites in Gaza. On 18 October, an airstrike destroyed a bakery in the Nuseirat Camp, killing four bakers. Subsequent strikes hit other bakeries, and by 24 October, many had closed, with those still open facing long lines. By 28 October, a fifth of Gaza's bakeries were destroyed. In early November, Israel bombed one of Gaza City's last bakeries, and UNOCHA reported over half of Gaza's bakeries had been destroyed. By mid-November, no bakeries were operating in northern Gaza, and the last flour mill was bombed. Israeli strikes also damaged fishing ports, warehouses, and farmland, with 22% of farmland destroyed by 12 December.

In 2024, UNOSAT reported 33% of agricultural land was damaged by February. In June, an Israeli missile hit one of Deir al-Balah's two flour mills, also damaging a WFP warehouse. By July, bakeries could not open due to fuel shortages. In October, UNOSAT and the Food and Agriculture Organization estimated 67.6% of Gaza's croplands had been damaged, severely impacting Gaza's food production.

=== Damage to the environment ===
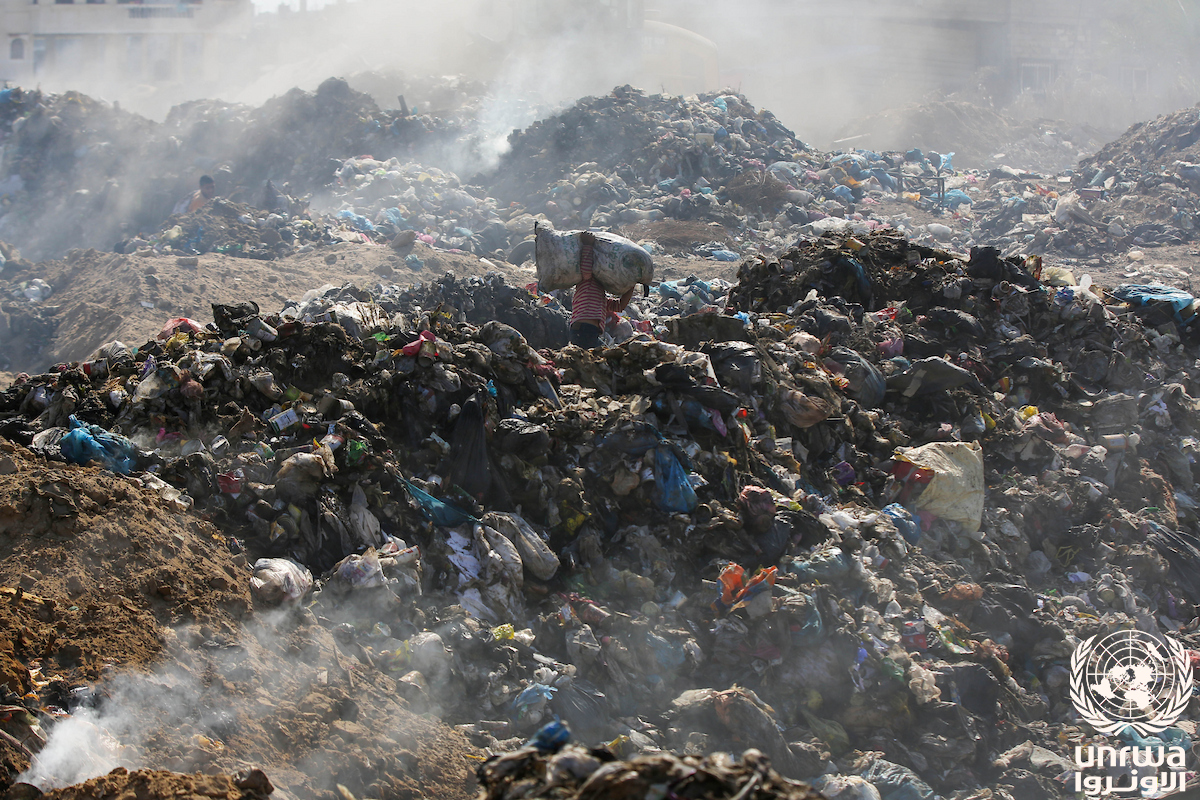
Accumulated waste in Gaza

There has been extensive environmental damage caused by the ongoing Israeli invasion of the Gaza Strip (itself a part of the Gaza war), including the destruction of agricultural land, displacement of people, bombing of Gaza, the Israeli blockade, and famine in the Gaza Strip. By March 2024, nearly half of the farmland in Gaza had been destroyed, and by the following January 80% of the tree cover had been destroyed.

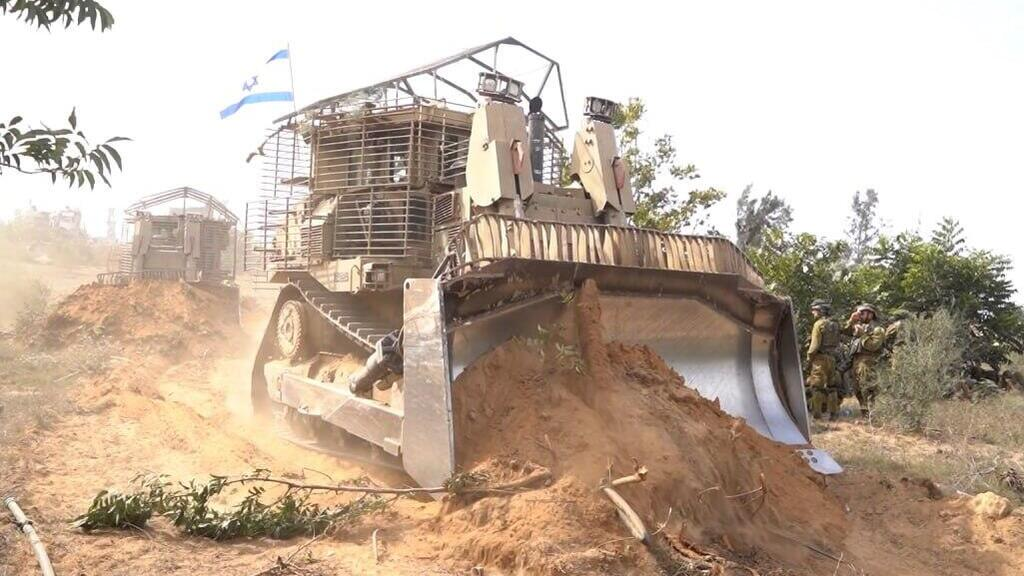
IDF bulldozer clearing trees in Gaza in October 2023

Israeli bombardment and the blockade have led to a total collapse of Gaza's civil infrastructure, including sewage treatment, waste disposal, water management, and fuel supplies. Water has been polluted by 130,000 cubic metres of sewage being discharged into the sea every day due to Israel cutting off fuel supplies. Groundwater has been contaminated by toxins and munitions and air has been polluted by smoke and particulates from bombing. Soils have been degraded by uprooting trees and contaminated by toxins, munitions, heavy bombing and demolitions. Bombing by the Israeli army has created 50 million tonnes of debris and hazardous material, much of which contains human remains and tens of thousands of bombs. In June 2024, northern Gaza was described as a "wasteland", unable to sustain life.

The size and lasting impact of the systematic and intentional destruction of agriculture in Gaza have led to calls by the research group Forensic Architecture at Goldsmiths, University of London, and the Palestinian Environmental NGOs Network for the Israeli Government to be investigated for the Rome Statute war crime of ecocide for "widespread, long-term and severe damage to the natural environment".

== Emergency and threat of famine ==
=== Timeline ===
==== November–December 2023 ====
Cindy McCain stated on 17 November that civilians faced the immediate possibility of starvation. Ten days later, McCain stated Gaza was on the brink of famine, as begging for food became the "new norm." On 1 December, an Integrated Food Security Phase Classification report, based on a committee of independent experts, placed almost the entire population of Gaza (93% or 2.08 million) at IPC Phase 3 or above (Crisis or worse) with 79% in Emergency (IPC Phase 4), and 15% (378,000 people) in Catastrophe (IPC Phase 5).

On 7 December, the WFP stated 97% of households had inadequate food consumption and 83% in southern Gaza were surviving through "extreme consumption strategies." By 10 December, the UN, international aid organizations, and relief workers in Gaza warned of mass starvation. A representative for Medical Aid for Palestinians stated, "The hunger wars have started." On 15 December, the United Nations estimated nine out of ten residents were not eating food every day.

On 20 December, the United Nations stated people in Gaza were experiencing "alarming levels of hunger never before witnessed in Gaza". On 21 December, the United Nations stated more than half a million people in the Gaza Strip were starving. On 22 December, UNICEF warned of the increasingly growing threat of famine in the Gaza Strip. On 29 December, Mercy Corps stated half a million people faced "catastrophic hunger and starvation".

IPC analysis of hunger in the Gaza Strip
Time period	Phase 5: "Catastrophe" or "Famine"		Phase 4: "Emergency"		Phase 3: "Crisis"		Phase 1 or 2	
Time period	Pop.	%	Pop.	%	Pop.	%	Pop.	%
24 Nov – 7 Dec 2023	377,283	17%	938,547	42%	765,990	34%	144,725	7%
15 Feb – 15 Mar 2024	676,636	30%	875,618	39%	577,963	26%	96,327	5%
1 May – 15 Jun 2024	342,719	15%	642,864	29%	1,148,301	51%	117,573	5%
1 Sep – 31 Oct 2024	132,987	6%	663,721	31%	1,044,353	49%	299,557	14%
1 Apr – 10 May 2025	244,000	12%	925,000	44%	775,000	37%	156,000	7%

==== January 2024 ====
By 1 January 2024 90% of Palestinians in Gaza regularly went without food. The IDF alleged Hamas stole humanitarian aid; killed people seeking humanitarian aid; and keeps its own supply reserves. The US and the UN both denied Israeli claims that Hamas looting plays a significant role in the lack of aid, with a senior US official stating that "the Israeli government has not brought to the attention of the US government... any specific evidence of Hamas theft or diversion of assistance provided via the U.N. and its agencies. Full stop."

On 3 January 2024, Arif Husain, the chief economist at the WFP, stated 80% of all people in the world experiencing famine or catastrophic hunger were in the Gaza Strip, stating, "In my life, I've never seen anything like this in terms of severity". Food prices rose in Gaza as food stocks were "running low".

The United Nations humanitarian chief Martin Griffiths stated on 5 January 2024, "People are facing the highest levels of food insecurity ever recorded." Alex de Waal, an expert on humanitarian crises and international law, stated, "The rigor, scale and speed of the destruction of the structures necessary for survival, and enforcement of the siege, surpasses any other case of man-made famine in the last 75 years." António Guterres stated, "The long shadow of starvation is stalking the people of Gaza".

On 16 January 2024, UNOCHA reported 378,000 people in Gaza were in IPC Phase 5, or catastrophic levels of hunger. It reported all 2.2 million people in the Gaza Strip were facing acute food insecurity – the highest proportion of a population experiencing starvation in recorded history. The Famine Review Committee (FRC) which compiled the Gaza data on famine in terms of the Integrated Food Security Phase Classification (IPC) on 1 December 2023, forecast that the total population will be at Phase 3 by 7 February and that 25% or 500,000 Gazans will reach Phase 5.

On 21 January 2024, a journalist in the Gaza Strip reported that people were making flour using animal food. On 21 January 2024, the UN reported there were only 15 bakeries still in operation across the entirety of the Gaza Strip. By 30 January 2024, CNN reported that Palestinians were eating grass to stay alive. On 31 January, the World Health Organization's emergencies director stated, "This is a population that is starving to death."

==== February–April 2024 ====
On 12 February, the Food and Agriculture Organization stated there were "unprecedented levels of acute food insecurity, hunger, and near-famine-like conditions in Gaza." Israel attacked fishermen in Deir el-Balah attempting to catch fish to eat. On 27 February 2024, Carl Skau, the deputy executive director of the WFP, told the United Nations Security Council that more than 500,000 people were at risk of imminent famine in Gaza.

On 17 February 2024, ActionAid stated that "every single person in the territory" was facing extreme levels of hunger, stating that people had even run out of animal feed to eat. By March, bird feed in northern Gaza had run out and people ate livestock feed. On 3 March, the Gaza government media office stated, "the famine is still deepening". In March 2024, experts, such as the United Nations Special Rapporteur on the Right to Food, warned that Gaza might already be experiencing famine; while Jeremy Konyndyk, the president of Refugees International, stated that "large-scale famine mortality" would soon begin. On 7 March, UNOCHA stated that the annual rate of food inflation was 118% in January 2024, while the consumer price index for food rose nearly 105%. March Epidemiological forecasts projected future deaths in Gaza from all causes, including epidemics, as ranging from 48,210 to 193,180 by August 2024.

On 13 March 2024, Israeli spokesperson Daniel Hagari said they were "trying to flood the area" with aid and that they were "learning and improving and doing different changes." In late March, António Guterres stated that it was time to "truly flood Gaza with lifesaving aid" and that the starvation was a "moral outrage" Israeli Ministry of Strategic Affairs Ron Dermer said that reports of an imminent famine were "a complete lie and fabrication" and "a libel against Israel." In April, Yoav Gallant announced that Israel would create a new crossing on its border and that "we plan to flood Gaza with aid". Philippe Lazzarini stated on 30 April that "there is more food available on the market", but "no cash circulating" in northern Gaza, making the food inaccessible. He further acknowledged the increase in supplies entering Gaza in April, but cautioned that it was "still far from enough to reverse the negative trend".

In early April 2024, the Red Cross said that 2.2 million people in Gaza were considered to be experiencing food insecurity at the emergency level.

On 30 April 2024, when rendering its verdict in the Nicaragua v. Germany genocide case, the International Court of Justice said that it remained concerned about the situation in Gaza, "In particular, in view of the prolonged and widespread deprivation of food and other basic necessities to which they have been subjected". In its March 2024 interim ruling, the ICJ stated, "The court observes that Palestinians in Gaza are no longer facing only a risk of famine ... but that famine is setting in."

Following the Israeli military’s drone attack on three clearly marked World Central Kitchen (WCK) trucks in April 2024, Israel’s chief military prosecutor announced in August 2026 that no criminal proceedings would be initiated regarding the incident. The trucks were carrying food aid for the people of Gaza. According to a report by The Guardian and interviews with senior Israeli officers, endangering civilians and aid workers is not a consideration when Israeli forces undertake civil control missions in Gaza.

==== May–July 2024 ====
In May 2024, the head of humanitarian policy and advocacy at Save the Children, stated the official count of 28 children dead from malnutrition and disease was "probably the tip of the iceberg", due to the destruction of Gaza's healthcare system.

In May 2024, the WFP reported, "The threat of famine in Gaza never loomed larger". The United Nations humanitarian chief stated famine in Gaza was an "immediate, clear and present danger" as food ran out and humanitarian operations were stuck. The Gaza media office said 98% of bakeries were closed. In June 2024, the WFP and the Food and Agriculture Organization stated in a joint statement that more than 1 million people could face severe starvation within a month. The same month, the World Health Organization stated only two nutrition stabilisation centers remained operational in the Gaza Strip.

The Famine Early Warning Systems Network (FEWS NET) reported later in May that famine was possible in northern Gaza. The FRC, citing uncertainty and the disparate evidence used in the FEWS NET analysis, did not endorse their findings. They expressed concerns over the methodology employed in the analysis and suggested that "a reduction in acute malnutrition might also be considered possible" citing a greater food supply. The IPC found a decreasing risk of famine in their June assessment, but emphasized that the risk of famine remains high. The FRC, endorsing the IPC's findings, noted that Israel permitted an increasing amount of food into northern Gaza since March. (Note: Devereux suggests that pressure exerted by US President Joe Biden on Netanyahu to ease the blockade after the IDF attacked a World Central Kitchen aid convoy led to increased aid.)

In June 2024, Cindy McCain, the head of the WFP, stated children and adults were dying from starvation after being reduced to the "size of a skeleton". The same month, FEWS NET stated, "Regardless of whether or not the famine (IPC phase 5) thresholds have been definitively reached or exceeded, people are dying of hunger-related causes across Gaza".

In late June, a leaked UN document said that 95% of the population of Gaza were in food insecurity, while almost 500,000 were facing near-famine hunger. The report found famine remained a possibility throughout the entirety of the Gaza Strip, and that the risk was "as high" as at any other time during the conflict. The UN stated one in five households went entire days without eating. On 30 June 2024, the IPC Global Famine Review Committee said evidence indicated famine was not occurring in Gaza, but that high risk of famine would persist as long as the war and warned against complacency." Israel has challenged the IPC's past methodology, citing academics in the Israeli public health sector.

On 9 July 2024, a group of UN experts released a statement that Israel's "targeted starvation campaign" had caused the death of children in Gaza and that famine had spread from the North to the rest of Gaza. The statement cited the deaths of three children who had recently died of malnutrition in Gaza, saying: "When the first child dies from malnutrition and dehydration, it becomes irrefutable that famine has taken hold." According to Devereux, while there was no famine in Gaza "in the first half of 2024" according to the IPC's food insecurity scale, the situation in Gaza fell under other scholarly definitions which see it "as a process of intensifying food crisis," agreeing with the declarations of famine by FEWS NET and the WFP. WHO stated people were trapped in a "vicious cycle" as malnutrition was worsening people's vulnerability to diseases. According to a group of UN experts, as of July 2024 Israel's "targeted starvation campaign" had spread throughout the entire Gaza Strip, causing the death of children. The same month, detected cases of childhood malnutrition in northern Gaza increased by 300% compared to May 2024. In September 2024, Refugees International warned that food conditions had "deteriorated badly" since May, stating, "There remains a grave risk of famine conditions spiraling once again."

==== October–December 2024 ====
Israel tightened the blockade in October, and individuals familiar with aid flow into the Gaza Strip stated that the amount of humanitarian aid entering the Strip was at its lowest levels in seven months. The WFP stated on 11 October 2024 that no food had entered northern Gaza that entire month, and that one million people faced starvation. The World Food Programme (WFP) warned in October 2024 that one million people were at risk of starvation. The human rights organizations Gisha, B'Tselem, Physicians for Human Rights and Yesh Din warned this was one of the "alarming signs" that Israel was implementing the General's Plan to starve northern Gaza. The United Nations warned on 17 October that it would run out of food for people in northern Gaza in just a week and a half. The IPC released an updated report, finding nearly all people in Gaza faced high levels of acute food insecurity (Phase 3), and 133,000 people faced catastrophic lack of food (Phase 5). By the end of the month, humanitarian aid to the Gaza Strip reached its lowest levels since the conflict began.

In December 2024, OCHA claimed that only 2,205 aid trucks had entered Gaza, while Israel said 5,000 entered. The pre-war amount was about 15,000 a month. OCHA claimed that 91% of Gaza's population faced "high levels of acute food insecurity". Israel considered that month whether to limit more humanitarian aid after Donald Trump's election.

==== January–March 2025 ====
During the January 2025 Gaza war ceasefire, Israel permitted a maximum of 600 aid trucks to enter every day. The deliveries did not have any significant disruptions, and prices of food was lower. On 5 February, the UN reported that over one million people had received food aid since the start of the ceasefire. In addition to food parcel deliveries, there were increased bread deliveries at bakeries and food kitchens. A community kitchen in northern Gaza had reopened on 24 January. The WFP delivered fuel, enabling five Gazan bakeries to boost production capacity by 40%.

==== March – 9 October 2025 ====
On 2 March 2025, Israel cut off all aid to the Gaza Strip. The blockade caused food prices to increase by up to 1,400%. By the end of the month, all bakeries supported by the WFP had run out of flour and cooking oil. During this complete blockade (2–25 March), at least 58 people starved to death. In mid-April 2025, 12 CEOs of humanitarian organizations signed a statement that aid systems were in danger of collapsing.

On 25 April, the WFP announced that it had delivered its last remaining supplies to kitchens preparing hot meals in Gaza; the meals were expected to be gone within days. The kitchens had been the only consistent source of food assistance in the last few weeks, although they reached only half of the population with one quarter of their daily food requirements. On 28 April, the Gaza Media Office announced that there were over 65,000 cases of acute malnutrition in children in the Gaza Strip. UNRWA corroborated these claims, saying there were 66,000 children suffering from severe malnutrition in May.

According to a United Nations report from early June, 2,700 children under the age of five in Gaza were suffering from acute malnutrition, representing a threefold increase compared to three months earlier.

In mid-July, it was reported that at least 76 children and 10 adults had died from malnutrition throughout the Gaza war. On 23 July, the Gaza Health Ministry reported that 10 people had died from starvation in the previous 24 hours; this was after reporting the previous day that 15 people had died in the 24 hours before that. This brought the total death count from starvation to 111. On 26 July, the death toll rose to 122.

The IPC reported on 25 July that a "worst-case scenario of famine" is unfolding in Gaza, citing additional displacement caused by a new offensive in Deir al-Balah, mass killings near aid sites operated by the Gaza Humanitarian Foundation, and the lack of ready-to-eat items distributed by the GHF. On 22 August, the IPC and the FRC confirmed famine within the Gaza Governorate, warning that the classification could spread throughout Gaza. It concluded that Deir al-Balah Governorate and Khan Yunis Governorate would reach famine levels within a month. The IPC had insufficient data on North Gaza Governorate for a classification but concluded that conditions were likely similar or worse than in the Gaza Governorate.

On 30 August, CNN reported that Israel had been dropping leaflets over Gaza City telling residents to move south of Wadi Gaza. However, the International Committee of the Red Cross said, "Such an evacuation would trigger a massive population movement that no area in the Gaza Strip can absorb, given the widespread destruction of civilian infrastructure and the extreme shortages of food, water, shelter and medical care."

Since the GHF began operating in Gaza in May, at least 1,373 aid seekers have been killed, according to the UN Human Rights Office. Of these, 859 were near GHF-run aid sites, and 514 were killed while waiting along food convoy routes controlled by the IDF. Additionally, an MSF worker reported that Israeli forces attacked Palestinians who were following aid trucks.

According to Democracy Now, the Palestinian academic Omar Harb starved to death at age 60 on 4 September.

On 9 October 2025, UNRWA said they have enough food for the entrite population of the Gaza strip for 3 months.

==== 10 October 2025 – present ====
The ceasefire between Israel and Hamas went into effect on 10 October 2025. Under the ceasefire terms, Israel was to permit up to 600 humanitarian aid trucks to enter Gaza each day. Since then, the limit has been reduced to 300, with Israeli officials attributing the change to delays in recovering the bodies of Israeli hostages believed to be buried beneath rubble from Israeli strikes. Data from the UN2720 Monitoring and Tracking Dashboard, which records the movement of humanitarian convoys entering Gaza, showed that between 10 and 16 October, only 216 trucks reached their intended destinations within Gaza.

Since the ceasefire, Israel has increased the entry of medical and humanitarian supplies into Gaza; however, according to WHO, the amount remains far below what is required to restore the territory's health system. On 23 October, 41 humanitarian organizations working in Gaza accused Israel of obstructing aid deliveries despite ceasefire commitments, citing arbitrary rejections of shipments and new restrictions on NGO registration. Between 10 and 21 October, 17 international NGOs were denied entry for essential supplies including food, water, and medicine, with 94% of all rejections issued to such organizations.

On December 19, the IPC published a report, declaring that there is no longer a famine in Gaza after improvements in availability to commercial and humanitarian food delivery following the ceasefire, but warned that the situation remains "highly fragile". The IPC report also stated that more than 100,000 people faced catastrophic conditions, but projected that figure to decline to around 1,900 people by April 2026.

On 24 June 2026, Aziza al-Kahlout, spokesperson for the Palestinian Ministry of Social Development, said that the Gaza Strip was going through a critical phase due to a sharp decline in humanitarian aid deliveries in recent months, describing the situation as a "silent famine". She said living conditions had deteriorated significantly and that residents were facing increasing difficulty accessing food, clean water, and essential services. According to the ministry, approximately 14,242 aid trucks entered Gaza between January and the end of May 2026, compared with an expected 45,000 trucks based on planned daily aid deliveries, meaning that less than one-third of the anticipated aid had arrived.

On 19 October, the UN World Food Programme (WFP) reports that funding shortages are causing major cuts to its aid program in Gaza, affecting around 500,000 people who will lose monthly food support. The WFP is reducing monthly assistance from 1.6 million to 1.1 million recipients. Food rations have been halved, and cash assistance for 75,000 families has been cut. The number of daily hot meals provided has dropped to 150,000 from 250,000, with some families in hard-to-reach areas receiving meals only every other day. Two-thirds of Gaza’s population, about 1.4 million people, face severe food insecurity, and the situation remains dire despite last year's ceasefire.

=== Southern Gaza ===
On 7 January 2024, the UNRWA deputy director reported severe hunger in southern Gaza, stating, "I don't know how much more they can bear before something explodes in the southern part of Gaza". On 11 February, the mayor of Rafah stated the city was facing famine and that available supplies were only enough for 10% of the population. Long queues for food were reported in Rafah. On 15 February, UNOCHA stated there was "an urgent need to establish a stabilisation centre in Rafah for treating children suffering from severe malnutrition". UNOCHA stated on 17 February that people in Rafah were in "such dire need that they stop aid trucks to take food and eat it immediately". On 19 February, Israeli gunboats fired at fishermen attempting to catch fish off the coast of Rafah. A 73-year-old displaced woman stated on 25 February, "I have never witnessed the starvation like this... Death for us is much better than our current life".

In May 2024, Israel launched a military offensive in Rafah, seizing and closing the Rafah crossing, one of two major crossings for humanitarian aid in Gaza. Martin Griffiths, the UN's emergency relief coordinator, stated, "Civilians in Gaza are being starved and killed and we are prevented from helping them." In an assessment report, UNOCHA stated the closure of Rafah crossing and Israel's assault would have "serious consequences" for food and nutrition services. The UN ceased food distribution in Rafah on 21 May 2024, stating that humanitarian operations were on the verge of collapse, and if food supplies did not begin entering "in massive quantities, famine-like conditions will spread". On 30 May, the WFP stated food access was so constrained that southern Gaza was at risk of the same levels of catastrophic hunger as the north. In June 2024, the WFP stated its stocked up supplies of food in southern Gaza were beginning to run out. In July 2024, the WFP stated they had been forced to reduce food rations for families in central and southern Gaza due to limited supplies. In September 2024, the UN warned that more than 1 million people in southern and central Gaza had received no food rations in the month of August.

=== Northern Gaza ===
Percent of population in each IPC phase by region (6 May 2025)
- "Catastrophe" (phase 5)
- "Emergency" (phase 4)
- "Crisis" (phase 3)
- "Stressed" (phase 2)

On 13 January 2024, The Guardian reported that the WFP had stated that nine out of ten people in northern Gaza were eating less than a meal a day. The World Health Organization stated on 25 January 2024 that the food situation was "absolutely horrific" in northern Gaza, with rare aid deliveries mobbed by visibly starved people with sunken eyes. A Mercy Corps team member reported he had witnessed such intense overcrowding of thousands around two food aid trucks in northern Gaza that two people suffocated to death. A relief worker with Al Baraka, an Algerian charity, stated northern Gaza was on the verge of famine, saying, "Almost no relief aid has been delivered to the people here since the beginning of Israel's aggression."

On 10 February 2024, the Gaza Media Office stated, "We immediately demand the entry of a thousand trucks daily into northern Gaza until it recovers from the famine". On 15 February, Al Jazeera reported that people in northern Gaza were going days and even weeks without sufficient food. The Food and Agriculture Organization stated that distributing food in northern Gaza remained a challenge as it was "barely accessible". To survive, people ate animal feed, herbs, weeds, and grass. A UNOCHA representative stated, "There are about 300,000 people in the north and I have no idea how they've survived". In late February 2024, a grain mill in northern Gaza shut down due to a lack of fuel.

On 20 February 2024, the WFP stated it would cease aid delivery to northern Gaza. In response to the announcement, the Gaza Media Office stated it was "a death sentence for three-quarters of a million people". On 24 February, UNRWA announced it was also suspending humanitarian services in northern Gaza. Families in Jabalia refugee camp reported being so hungry they ate scraps, leaves, and their horses. One man in Jabalia stated, "We have no water, no flour and we are very tired because of hunger." Al Jazeera reported that two sisters searching for food on 25 February had been shot and claimed that Israeli Army was responsible for the incident. Thousands of people in Gaza City waited for a possible delivery of flour on 25 February.

On 27 February 2024, the Gaza Health Ministry stated, "What is happening in northern Gaza is a true famine... This escalating famine could kill thousands of citizens due to malnutrition and dehydration in the coming days in front of the eyes of the world." A man in the Jabalia refugee camp stated children "are dying and fainting in the streets from hunger. What can we do?" On 17 March 2024, 13 aid trucks arrived in Jabalia and Gaza City without incident, for the first time in months. In late March 2024, the Integrated Food Security Phase Classification placed northern Gaza in Phase 5, its most severe stage. Analysis from the Food and Agriculture Organization found widespread destruction in Gaza's agricultural sector, including the deaths of 60% of milk cows, 70% of cattle stock, and 60% of small ruminants like goats and sheep.

On 29 March 2024, the US State Department stated that famine in northern Gaza "quite possibly is present in at least some areas". A UNOCHA spokesperson stated people faced "cruel death by famine". By late March, the growing season for khobiza, a wild plant eaten in northern Gaza, was ending, which journalist Moath al-Kahlout stated "will lead to an even more horrific famine". The UN stated 30% of its March 2024 aid missions had been denied. In April 2024, Oxfam reported that people in northern Gaza were surviving on an average of 245 calories a day.

On 3 May 2024, Cindy McCain, American director of the U.N. WFP, said "There is famine—full-blown famine—in the north, and it's moving its way south." In early June 2024, the Famine Early Warning Systems Network (FEWS NET) stated, "It is possible, if not likely" that famine was underway in northern Gaza.

In late June, the FRC released a new analysis of the IPC projections in north Gaza. It challenged the IPC and FEWS NET's methodologies and said that current evidence did not prove that famine was imminent. However, it acknowledged the "extreme human suffering" of civilians in Gaza and called for sustainable humanitarian aid to enter. It also said that conditions in north Gaza had seemingly improved. In response to the IPC findings, the WFP stated that "The improvement shows the difference that greater access can make" and "Increased food deliveries to the north and nutrition services have helped to reduce the very worst levels of hunger, leaving a still desperate situation." In July 2024, UNOCHA stated commercial trucks had not been able to make deliveries to northern Gaza for several months. In August 2024, the United Nations reported that childhood malnutrition cases had increased 300% between May and July 2024.

In November 2024, amidst the Siege of North Gaza, the Inter-Agency Standing Committee stated, "The entire Palestinian population in North Gaza is at imminent risk of dying from disease, famine and violence." On 8 November, the Famine Review Committee that famine was "imminent in areas within the Northern Gaza Strip." It also warned that action would need to be taken "within days not weeks" to avoid the situation.

== Humanitarian aid ==
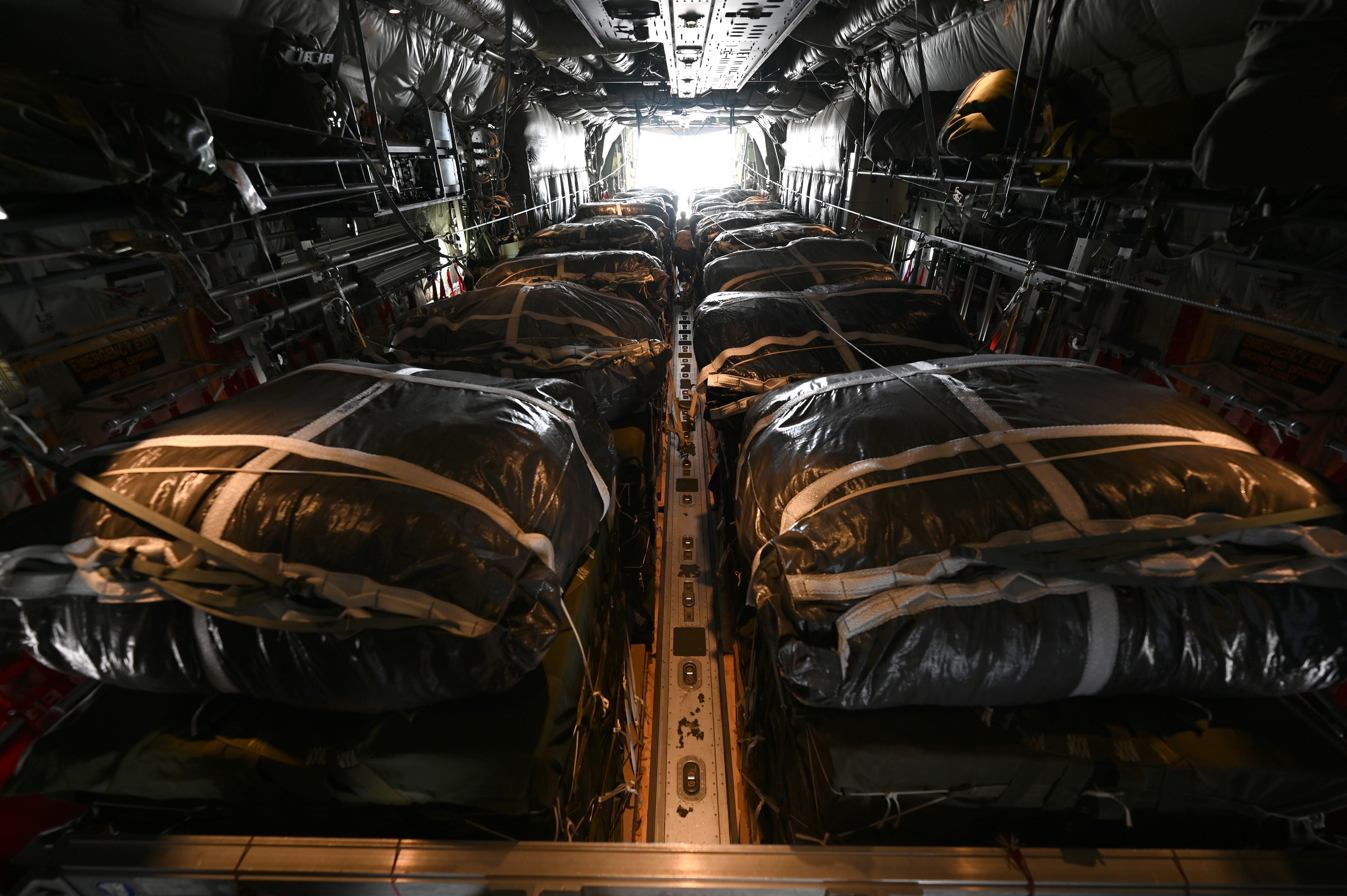
March 2024 US airdrop of aid into Gaza. Al Jazeera reported that the drop was described as "ineffective" by Oxfam, and "symbolic" by a former director of USAID.

On 9 January 2024, Gisha reported that only 6,000 aid trucks had entered Gaza since 7 October, the equivalent of 12 days of aid before the conflict's start. Colonel Moshe Tetro, who heads the Israeli unit overseeing deliveries of humanitarian aid, stated that there was no food shortage in Gaza and that existing reserves are sufficient. Another Israeli official stated, "Don't forget that this is an Arab, Gazan population whose DNA is to hoard, certainly when it comes to food."

Officials stated that the worsening crisis was partly attributable to the limited amount of aid being allowed into Gaza, with Cindy McCain stating, "People in Gaza risk dying of hunger just miles from trucks filled with food". Arif Husain, the WFP chief economist, stated on 24 January that only between 20 and 30% of needed aid was entering Gaza, as UNOCHA accused Israel of "systematically denying" humanitarian assistance into northern Gaza.

On 1 February 2024, United Nations Secretary-General António Guterres called for unrestricted humanitarian access, stating, "Everyone in Gaza is hungry." Human Rights Watch stated that the decision of 18 countries to defund UNRWA risked hastening famine. The WFP stated on 2 February that aid to northern Gaza was being overwhelmingly rejected by the Israelis. Journalist Abubaker Abed stated, "Families eat strategically, just to stay alive."

While speaking to CNN reporters in February 2024, some Palestinians stated humanitarian aid was being resold on the black market, with packages already opened. Israeli airstrikes around certain areas also caused prices to spike, with a 25-kilogram bag of flour jumping from $20 in Kahn Younis to $34 after intensified airstrikes. The same month, Human Rights Watch criticized the defunding of UNRWA, which they termed "the main humanitarian channel into Gaza", in the face of "mounting risks of famine and a binding order by the World Court in a case about genocide".

On 13 February 2024, Finance Minister Bezalel Smotrich blocked a US-funded flour shipment to Gaza and stated he had done so "in coordination with the prime minister". White House National Security Adviser Jack Sullivan confirmed Israel was blocking flour from entering Gaza. On 14 February, the Financial Times reported that an aid shipment that could have fed more than 1 million people for a month had been blocked at the Israeli port of Ashdod, with the Israeli government stating the food would not be released. The UN stated aid deliveries had halved in February from the month before. On 28 February, USAID chief Samantha Power stated more aid needed to enter Gaza, calling the situation "a matter of life and death". Following a US announcement that it was beginning airdrops of aid and building a temporary port off the coast of Gaza, Michael Fakhri, the UN Special Rapporteur on the Right to Food, stated, "The time when countries use air drops and these maritime piers is usually, if not always, in situations when you want to deliver humanitarian aid into enemy territory".

In March 2024, there were efforts to address the crisis include attempts to negotiate a humanitarian aid cease-fire and allow for the provision of aid in addition to a hostage release deal. In March, the US began airdropping meals into Gaza. The first two aid drops provided over 74,800 US and Jordanian meals. The International Committee of the Red Cross stated in late March: "Some families receive a can of food every other day for the whole family". In late March, residents reported that animal feed was running out in parts of Gaza. In late April 2024, the WFP stated half of Gaza's population is starving. At the end of May 2024, the United Nations stated that humanitarian aid deliveries had dropped 67% since the start of Israel's Rafah offensive at the beginning of the month. The WFP stated it was unable to feed most civilians in Rafah and described conditions as "apocalyptic".

In June 2024, the WFP stated that aid workers moving through the Kerem Shalom crossing faced risks due to "fighting, damaged roads, unexploded ordnance, and Israeli restrictions." World Central Kitchen said it had provided over 50 million meals in Gaza with plans to expand operations. By the end of June 2024, almost no aid was entering into Gaza. As of July 2024, hundreds of trucks were waiting to enter into Gaza, some having been delayed for as long as two months. In September 2024, the Norwegian Refugee Council reported that 83% of required food aid was failing to enter the Gaza Strip.

=== Gaza floating pier ===
On 7 March 2024, President Biden announced plans to build a Gaza floating pier to deliver food and humanitarian aid. The pier's cost was an estimated $320 million. At its closure announcement on 17 July, the pier had been operational for 20 days, delivering 8,800 tonnes (19,400,000 lb) of aid. The pier had been dismantled three times because of high sea states.

=== Gaza Humanitarian Foundation ===
The Gaza Humanitarian Foundation (GHF) was an organization backed by the Israeli and American governments with the stated purpose of distributing humanitarian aid amid the ongoing famine and humanitarian crisis resulting from the Israeli blockade of the Gaza Strip. It was established in February 2025, suspended operations in October 2025, and closed in November 2025. Intended to bypass the United Nations as the main supplier of aid in Gaza, GHF began operating in May 2025 as a response to fraudulent Israeli claims that aid was being routinely diverted by Hamas. Aid organizations including the UN have denied these claims and attributed the aid theft to Palestinian groups armed by the Israeli military. The GHF has been criticized by the United Nations and humanitarian groups for politicizing aid distribution, with established humanitarian groups saying the GHF is giving cover for Israel to pursue its aims to depopulate Palestinians from the Gaza Strip and use starvation as a weapon of war.

There were repeated mass killings in the vicinity of GHF distribution sites. As of 15 August 2025, the UN Office of the High Commissioner for Human Rights (OHCHR) reported that of the 1,760 Palestinians killed since 27 May while seeking food, 994 were killed in the vicinity of GHF sites. The attacks at GHF sites were attributed to Israel Defense Forces (IDF) by the OHCHR, Gaza officials, and witnesses. US contractors with the GHF were also filmed shooting Palestinian civilians, and according to former staff, its organizational culture dehumanized aid seekers and imposed few controls on the behavior of contractors. The GHF and the IDF repeatedly denied responsibility for deaths at aid sites, saying that only warning shots were fired. Survivors of the repeated mass killings perpetrated at the distribution sites began to refer to the Israeli-backed operation as traps or death traps rather than aid. Doctors Without Borders described the conditions around these distributions as "slaughter masquerading as aid" and "orchestrated killing". The Center for Constitutional Rights and 14 other human rights organizations warned that the GHF could be liable for complicity in war crimes, crimes against humanity, and genocide against Palestinians. Critics referred to the mass killings at GHF sites as the "hunger games", in reference to the American media franchise.

The United Nations and other aid groups refused to cooperate with the GHF and accused them of politicizing and "weaponizing aid", and delivering it in a manner that is unsafe and degrading for the Palestinian people. The United Nations and over 170 charities and NGOs, including Save the Children and Oxfam, accused the GHF of failing to uphold and violating humanitarian norms by forcing two million Palestinians into overcrowded and militarized zones and subjecting aid-seekers to almost daily attacks; they demanded that the GHF be immediately closed.

GHF was led by executive director John Acree, a former USAID manager, and executive chairman Johnnie Moore, an American evangelical leader and businessman. GHF's operations were suspended following the October 2025 Gaza ceasefire. A spokesperson for the group described an intent to resume operations. In November 2025, the GHF announced the permanent end of its operations in Gaza, saying that they "succeeded in their mission of showing there's a better way to deliver aid to Gazans."

=== Israeli blocking of aid ===
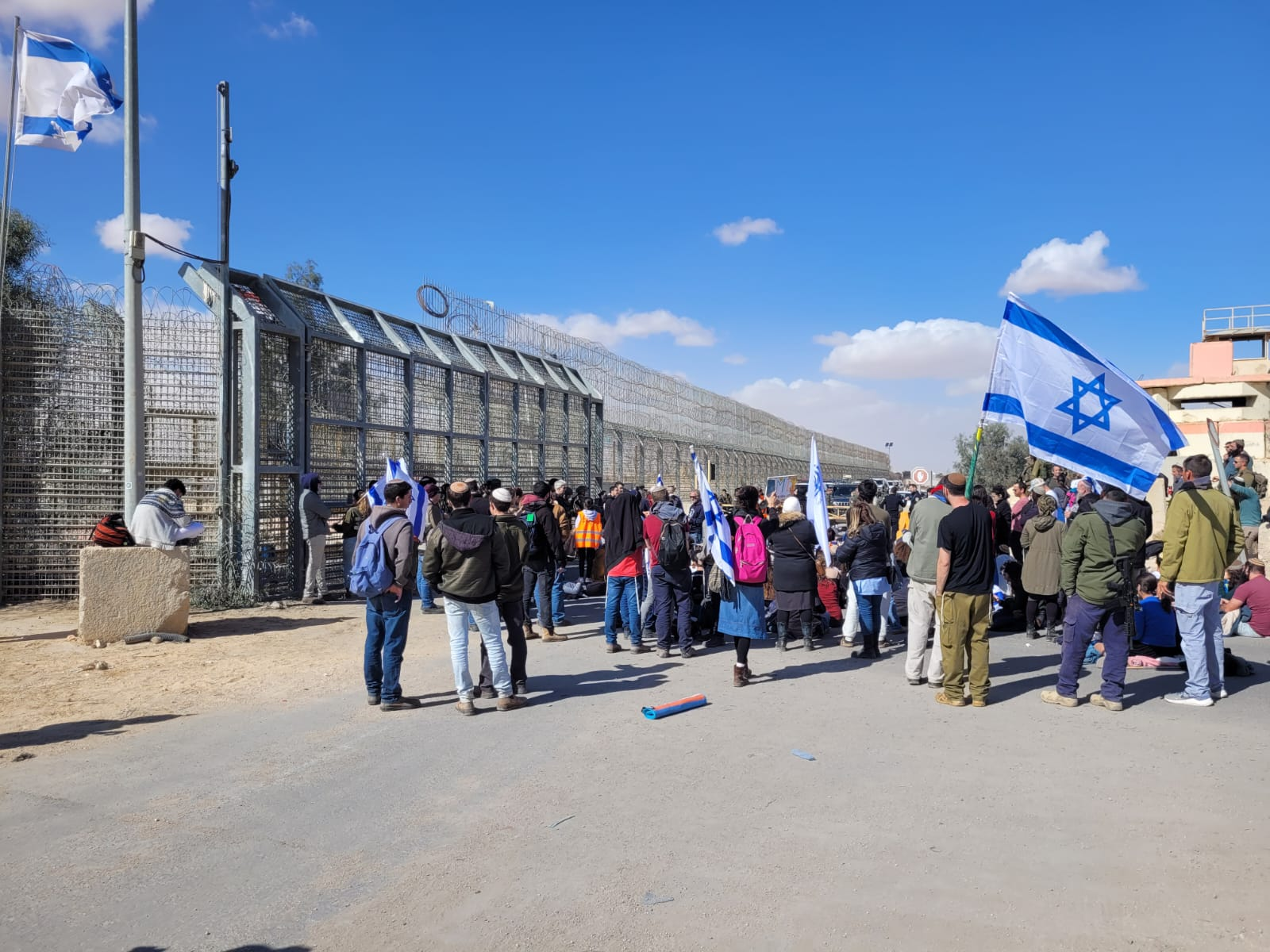
Israelis blocking humanitarian aid from entering Gaza, February 2024

Before being allowed entry into Gaza, humanitarian aid trucks are put through stringent inspections by Israel. Janti Soeripto, president and chief executive of Save the Children, explained to reporters the convoluted regulations that cause items to be turned back, like sanitary pads due to a nail clipper included in the hygiene kit, or sleeping bags because they had zippers. A humanitarian official in contact with the Israeli COGAT unit has raised claims that the rejections are due to the unit operating with only an obsolete list from 2008 and a lack of official guidance. Others, such as the European Union's top diplomat, Josep Borrell, have accused Israel of intentionally using starvation as a weapon of war. Israel also does not allow humanitarian aid bound for Gaza to be purchased in Israel or the West Bank, or to use Israel ports. It has also closed all but one of the Israel-Gaza checkpoints. Egyptian Foreign Minister Sameh Shoukry stated that "Israeli obstacles" were impeding the delivery of humanitarian aid. The World Health Organization stated their "requests to deliver supplies are often blocked or refused" by Israel. Antonio Guterres, the UN secretary-general, stated that alleviating conditions in Gaza "requires Israel removing the remaining obstacles and chokepoints to relief". A September 2024 investigation found that USAID and other agencies found Israel that deliberately blocked humanitarian aid, but the U.S. Secretary of State rejected their findings.

An investigation found that Israel was blocking cancer medications, sleeping bags, drinking water purification tablets, and maternity kits from entering Gaza, leading the Save the Children US president to state she had "never seen anything like the level of barriers being put in place to hamper humanitarian assistance". MP Rosena Allin-Khan stated that Israel had prevented water filters from entering Gaza. The UN reported Israel had rejected aid trucks for carrying medical scissors. On 6 March, Israel continued to block a major US shipment of flour from entering Gaza, after having already blocked it from entering for 46 days. On 7 March 2024, Israeli police blocked an aid convoy organized by the Jewish-Arab cooperation group Standing Together.

The president of the American Near East Refugee Aid stated, "Some governments—not just the US but others as well—who thought that they would make more headway with the Israelis on land aid threw up their hands and said, 'Well, let's do airdrops.'" In an interview with the New Yorker, US Senator Chris Van Hollen stated, "Administration officials have recognized that the Netanyahu government has put up unacceptable barriers to the delivery of humanitarian assistance into Gaza". Catherine Russell, the chair of UNICEF described Israel's bureaucratic approval system as Kafkaesque. In March, UNRWA said that Israel was no longer allowing the agency to deliver aid to northern Gaza. Martin Griffiths stated, "The decision to block its food convoys to the north only pushes thousands closer to famine. It must be revoked." The EU's Josep Borrell stated, "Enough food for the people starving in Gaza is stockpiled and waiting to enter through land routes".

Gisha, an Israeli human rights organization, stated Israel was blocking dual-use items and that it had petitioned the Israeli Supreme Court to order Israel to meets its obligations to civilians in Gaza. In April 2024, the Freedom Flotilla Coalition stated a scheduled aid trip to Gaza had been delayed by an administrative roadblock "initiated by Israel in an attempt to prevent our departure." A USAID internal assessment reportedly found Israel "does not currently demonstrate necessary compliance" with a requirement that countries not impede "the transport of delivery of United States humanitarian assistance". In July 2024, 13 human rights organizations, including Oxfam, Doctors Without Borders, Save the Children and the Norwegian Refugee Council, stated Israel was blocking humanitarian aid. UNICEF spokesperson James Elder stated that Israel was intentionally restricting aid from entering Gaza.

In September 2024, the Norwegian Refugee Council reported that 83% of required food aid was failing to enter the Gaza Strip. In October 2024, humanitarian aid deliveries dropped to their lowest levels in seven months, according to individuals involved with aid. After the United States told Israel it could face consequences unless it increased aid to northern Gaza, Israeli officials stated they would hold an "emergency meeting" regarding humanitarian aid. Soon after, the Israeli Knesset passed a bill barring contact between UNRWA and Israeli officials within three months, which is necessary for UNRWA to coordinate transferring aid into the Gaza Strip, due to Israel controlling all crossings. The United States responded by saying they had not seen enough progress by Israel to increase humanitarian aid deliveries. Several days later, the U.S. stated it would "follow the law" if Israel did not comply with its recommendation to allow in humanitarian aid by its deadline.

In November 2024, it was reported that Israel allowed limited delivery of aid to Beit Hanoun, in northern Gaza, but before the aid arrived, the Israeli army forced inhabitants to evacuate the area or risk being harmed in airstrikes.

In February 2025, according to the Israeli Defense Ministry, a truck carrying aid through the Erez corridor was searched and found to be smuggling hundreds of smartphones, and other electronics. The driver was subsequently arrested.

=== Israeli attacks on aid distribution ===
According to Forensic Architecture, a research group at Goldsmiths, University of London, more than 40 Israeli attacks on humanitarian aid seekers have been documented. According to the group, these were not isolated events, but were rather "systematic in nature".

Human Rights Watch reported eight incidents since the start of the war until May 2024 in which aid workers were attacked by Israeli forces despite providing locations for Israeli leaders. The eight incidents, it said, reveal serious flaws in the so-called "conflict prevention mechanism" – a mechanism designed to protect aid workers and allow them to safely deliver life-saving humanitarian aid to the Gaza Strip.

On 25 January 2024, the Gaza Health Ministry reported an Israeli attack on aid seekers had killed 20 and wounded 150. Israel bombed a truck loaded with food head toward northern Gaza on 5 February. On 6 February, Israeli forces reportedly opened fire on people waiting for food aid trucks in Gaza City. UNOCHA stated it was the fifth report of Israeli firing upon people waiting for humanitarian aid. On 18 February, multiple instances of Israeli sniper attacks on civilians seeking humanitarian assistance were reported. On 20 February, at least one Palestinian civilian was killed while waiting to receive humanitarian aid. People seeking aid were attacked by Israeli forces on multiple occasions. UNOCHA stated on 27 February that "aid convoys have come under fire and are systematically denied access to people in need". On 28 February, medical sources in Gaza City reported three people were killed while waiting for aid on al-Rashid Street.

On 29 February, more than 100 people seeking humanitarian died in the Flour Massacre by Israeli gunfire at the Al Nabulsi roundabout west of Gaza City. The United Nations called for an investigation on 1 March into the killing of humanitarian aid seekers, stating it had "recorded at least 14 incidents involving shooting and shelling of people gathered to receive desperately needed supplies".

On 2 March, three people in Beit Hanoun were killed while picking herbs for food. On 3 March, at least nine people were killed while waiting for humanitarian aid in an Israeli airstrike in Deir el-Balah. Later on the same day, dozens of civilians were killed in an Israeli attack on aid seekers at the Kuwaiti roundabout in Gaza City. The Ministry of Health called it a "horrific massacre". On 4 March, another attack was reported at the Kuwaiti roundabout, after thousands of people waited all day for humanitarian aid, Israeli soldiers opened fire on them as soon as the trucks arrived. Al Jazeera stated the attacks on aid seekers had become "a near-daily occurrence". On 6 March, eight people were wounded after Israel fired live rounds at people seeking humanitarian aid at the Nabulsi roundabout. On 7 March, five people were killed while waiting for aid at the Nabulsi roundabout. On 8 March, several people seeking humanitarian aid were reportedly killed by Israeli open fire at the Kuwait Roundabout. By 12 March, Israel had killed an estimated 400 humanitarian aid seekers in Gaza. Israeli attacks on humanitarian aid seekers was described as the "new normal" for Palestinians in northern Gaza.

On 13 March 2024, at least nine aid seekers were shot and wounded by Israeli troops at the Kuwaiti roundabout. On 14 March 2024, Israeli troops fired on Palestinians receiving aid at the Kuwaiti roundabout, killing 21 and injuring more than 150 others. In a statement on 15 March, the UN humanitarian aid chief Martin Griffiths stated that attacks on aid seekers "cannot be allowed to continue". The Norwegian Refugee Council stated the attacks "shouldn't be happening". On 19 March, at least 23 people were killed when Israeli fighter jets targeted a group of aid coordinators at the Kuwaiti roundabout.

On 1 April 2024, an Israeli drone fired three consecutive missiles at three cars belonging to the World Central Kitchen (WCK), killing seven aid workers who had been distributing food in the northern Gaza Strip, which has been pushed close to famine by Israel's siege and blockade during the Israel–Hamas war. In June 2024, eight people were reportedly killed at an UNRWA aid distribution training center near Gaza City.

From May 2025 GHF was set up as the sole aid distributor in Gaza but repeated and regular mass shootings and killings at the distribution sites means that they have been described as "slaughter masquerading as aid".

Survivors of the repeated mass killings perpetrated at the distribution sites have called this Israeli-backed operation "traps" rather than aid. The Center for Constitutional Rights and 14 other human rights organizations have warned that the GHF could be liable for complicity in war crimes, crimes against humanity, and genocide against Palestinians.

Members of the IDF and of the Israeli police have been providing information to far right Israeli settlers about upcoming aid truck convoys delivering food to Gaza so they could intercept the deliveries to vandalize and destroy them. A spokesperson for the radical right Israeli group Tzav 9 stated that the group has been blocking aid trucks to Gaza since January 2024, acknowledged receiving advance information from Israeli forces but denied being the ones who burned trucks. Videos taken in May 2024 show Israelis intercepting aid trucks and destroying food aid. Many Israeli and Palestinian witnesses reported that the IDF soldiers sent to accompany and protect the aid trucks watched as the settlers attacked the convoys but did nothing to protect them.

=== Looting ===
In February 2024, The Wall Street Journal reported that lawlessness in Gaza was hindering aid efforts. Axios reported that armed gangs have been attacking and looting aid trucks since Hamas police have quit due to Israeli attacks. A Palestine Red Crescent Society spokesman stated that the civil disorder "contributed to around a 50% decrease in the total number of aid trucks entering Gaza in February" and an Egyptian aid truck driver described people climbing and smashing aid trucks.

In June, The New York Times reported that relief groups had stopped delivering aid to southern Gaza due to looting and attacks from armed gangs, with aid trucks being peppered by bullet holes. Both commercial and aid agencies decided that they could not risk employees' lives. One aid worker described the daily attacks from armed criminal gangs in the Israel-Gaza border area as being coordinated and organized. The worker said that sometimes the aid truck drivers were beaten. AP News spoke with an UN official who described thousands of aid trucks piled up, armed groups regularly obstructing convoys, and drivers being held at gunpoint. A worker at a Palestinian trucking company said that aid was spoiling in the hot weather. To try to make up for the aid deficiency, Israel allowed more commercial trucks into Gaza from Israel and the occupied West Bank, which unlike UN convoys, usually travel with armed protection. One Gazan businessman said that in the past he paid thousands of dollars to other Gazans to protect his trucks. An associate professor of political science at Al-Azhar University said the lawlessness is a result of increasing desperation and the power vacuum left from Hamas' decreasing power over Gaza.

In late June, the UN warned that it would suspend aid operations in Gaza unless Israel increased efforts to protect humanitarian workers. A State Department spokesman said that in June, looting and other criminal attacks were the largest barriers to delivering aid, rather than Israeli strikes or Hamas' commandeering of aid convoys. In July, the UN said that they would be bringing in more personal safety equipment and armored vehicles following approval from Israeli officials.

On 16 November 2024 armed gangs captured and looted 98 trucks carrying aid. The convoy, which had been organized by UNRWA and the WFP, consisted of 109 trucks and was attacked shortly after crossing into Gaza from Kerem Shalom. A UNRWA spokesperson said that "We're back at a stage where we're seeing people literally fighting over a bag of flour" and that "Israeli authorities continue to restrict a huge amount of the humanitarian response. Everything here is being strangled—food, flour, water—everything." One UN aid official blamed organized crime for attacks on aid convoys, and others have reported that family clans from southern Gaza previously known to be involved with looting were behind the most recent attacks on convoys. UN aid officials have said that delivering aid has never been more difficult. According to a UN memo, the criminals would operate with "the passive, if not active benevolence" of the IDF.

== Effect on children and elderly ==
=== Children ===
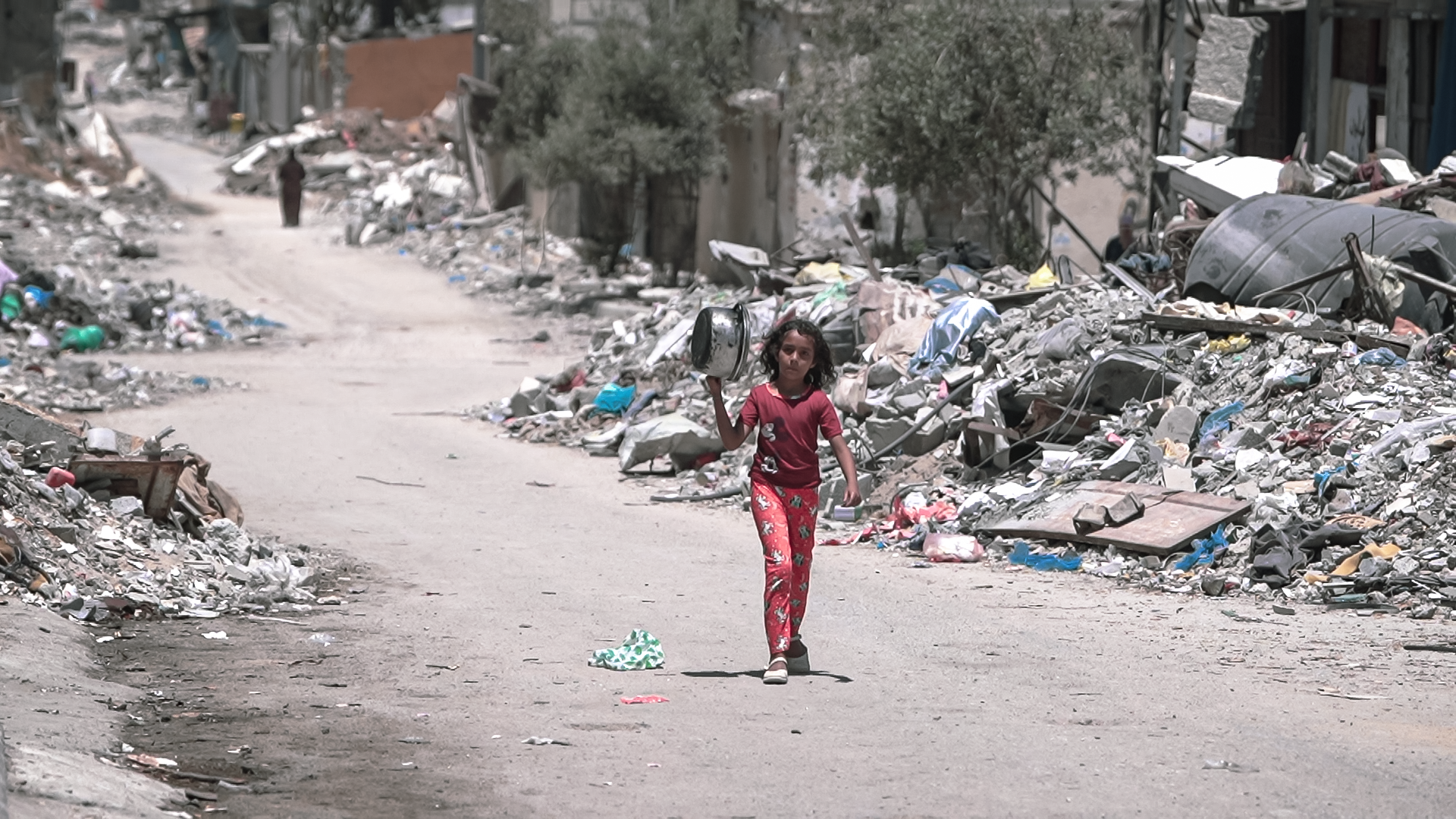
Girl in Gaza on her way to get food (August 2024).

On 14 January 2024, Philippe Lazzarini stated, "Whenever you go to a school, the kids are looking at your eyes begging for a sip of water or a loaf of bread." On 16 January, officials reported newborn babies with undernourished mothers were dying within days, and children weakened by starvation were dying from hypothermia. On 18 January, the deputy executive director of UNICEF took a tour of the Gaza Strip, stating he had witnessed "some of the most horrific conditions I have ever seen" and that "thousands of children are malnourished and sick." On 10 February 2024, a UNICEF spokesperson said Gaza had the world's highest rate of child malnutrition. On 17 February, the Euro-Mediterranean Human Rights Monitor reported an instance of an eight-year-old girl who had died from starvation and dehydration.

On 19 February 2024, UNICEF found that nearly 16% of children in northern Gaza under two years old were "acutely malnourished", with 3% suffering from severe wasting. One mother in northern Gaza described the situation on 21 February, stating, "My little one wakes up at night screaming from hunger". On 26 February, two children from Gaza City stated they ate once every two days, and were then eating animal feed. Action Aid, citing the head of pediatrics at Kamal Adwan Hospital, stated on 25 February that a "significant number" of children in northern Gaza had already died from starvation. At least six children died of malnutrition on 28 February. Project HOPE, an aid organization in Deir el-Balah, stated 11% of the under-five-year-olds they had seen were experiencing malnutrition.

A doctor at Kamal Adwan Hospital stated they had seen a steep rise in pediatric malnutrition cases. On 28 February, a representative from Save the Children stated that due to Israeli bombardment and restrictions on aid, children were starving with trucks full of food waiting to enter into Gaza, describing this as "the killing of children in slow motion". A two-year-old died from food poisoning after eating bread made from animal feed. Four more children died of starvation on 29 February, bringing the week's total to at least ten. Melanie Ward, the director of Medical Aid for Palestinians, stated, "This is the fastest decline in a population's nutrition status ever recorded. That means children are being starved at the fastest rate the world has ever seen." On 3 March, health officials stated at least 15 children at Kamal Adwan Hospital had died of malnutrition and dehydration in the preceding few days. CNN reported that the true number could be higher, with a UNICEF representative stating there were likely more starving children "fighting for their lives" in other parts of Gaza.

Yazan al-Kafarneh, a 10-year-old boy who died from starvation, was described as "the face of starvation in Gaza". The father of a 5-year-old who died from starvation stated, "He did not suffer from any disease. My child died before my eyes because of hunger". In June 2024, children died of malnutrition as Israel's Rafah offensive caused sharp reductions in humanitarian aid. The Gaza Media Office stated on 3 June 2024 that 3,500 children under the age of five were at risk of death from starvation. UNICEF placed the number at almost 3,000 children. The World Health Organization stated 8,000 children had been diagnosed with malnutrition. In late June 2024, a mother struggling to feed her children stated, "We are living the worst days of our lives in terms of famine and deprivation".

On 28 April 2025, the Gaza Media Office announced that there were over 65,000 cases of acute malnutrition in children in the Gaza Strip. On 25 May, a four-year-old child named Mohammad Mustafa Yassin died from prolonged malnutrition according to doctors at the Al-Ahli Arab Hospital. His death brings the number of Palestinians who have died from malnutrition due to the blockade in Gaza to 58.

In October 2026, UNICEF said gains in fighting malnutrition in Gaza are weak and could be undermined by supply disruptions, urging that all crossings stay open. Israel has halted commercial goods from entering Gaza due to a tax dispute with Hamas, cutting off crucial food supplies needed by those reliant on humanitarian aid after years of conflict and strict restrictions. Despite a ceasefire improving aid access, ongoing strikes and destruction leave civilians vulnerable. UNICEF noted that while malnutrition rates are slightly better, only one in three children under two have a proper diet, with chronic malnutrition affecting one in eight children under five.

==== Infants and newborns ====
A two-month-old baby died in Gaza City on 24 February from malnutrition. A pediatrician working in Gaza stated, "Nursing mothers are unable to lactate as their health worsens". The head of pediatrics at Kamal Adwan Hospital stated the hospital was struggling to find milk to feed infant patients, stating, "Even newborns are emaciated". The UN Population Fund stated doctors "no longer see normal-sized babies" but instead more stillborns. In March 2024, a doctor at the Emirati Hospital stated 16 premature babies had died from malnutrition-related diseases in the past five weeks. The United Nations reported that one-third of children under two were "acutely malnourished" by 16 March. Catherine M. Russell, the head of UNICEF, stated, "I have been in wards where babies are suffering from malnutrition, the whole ward is absolutely quiet because the babies don't even have the energy to cry." WHO stated, "What doctors and medical staff are telling us is more and more they are seeing the effects of starvation; they're seeing newborn babies simply dying because they (are) too low birth weight". On 15 March, UNICEF reported that acute malnutrition amongst under-two-year-olds had doubled in one month.

In late March 2024, doctors at Kamal Adwan Hospital stated babies were dying from hunger and dehydration. By June 2024, newborns and infants starved due to the lack of available infant formula and mothers' inability to breastfeed. In July 2024, ActionAid stated that according to their partners, "Pregnant women [are] losing their babies because they are so malnourished".

=== Elderly ===
In March 2024, the elderly were reportedly dying at an "alarmingly high rate", with the Euro-Med Monitor stating it was receiving daily reports of the elderly dying of starvation. The group stated, "The majority of these cases do not reach hospital... after dying at home, the elderly are buried either close to their residences or in makeshift graves".

== War crimes and genocide ==
On 18 December 2023, Human Rights Watch accused Israel of "using starvation of civilians as a method of warfare in the occupied Gaza Strip". On 16 January 2024, UN experts accused Israel of "destroying Gaza's food system and using food as a weapon against the Palestinian people". The United Nations Special Rapporteur on the Right to Food, Michael Fakhri, stated Israel was using hunger as a weapon against Palestinians. On 23 January, Alex De Waal stated Israel was committing a war crime through enforced starvation, stating, "An entire population being reduced to this stage is really unprecedented. We haven't seen it in Ethiopia, in Sudan and Yemen – pretty much anywhere else in the world."

On 13 February 2024, US Senator Chris Van Hollen stated, "Kids in Gaza are now dying from the deliberate withholding of food. That is a war crime. It is a textbook war crime. And that makes those who orchestrate it war criminals." A representative from the Palestinian non-profit organization Juhoud for Community and Rural Development stated, "The denial of access to food, water, and other necessities consists of a serious violation of international law". Josep Borrell, High Representative of the European Union for Foreign Affairs and Security Policy, said in an interview with El Pais that "We are already in the midst of a catastrophe. The United Nations has had to suspend humanitarian aid: Israel is using famine as a weapon of war and that is contrary to international law." On 3 March, Amnesty International head Agnes Callamard stated that the death of ten children from malnutrition that week was unlawful and the result of an Israeli "engineered famine".

The Palestinian Ministry of Foreign Affairs accused Israel of violating international law by "using starvation as a weapon of war". Physicians for Human Rights–Israel stated "According to the International Criminal Court, starvation is considered a war crime. Israel must immediately... stop limiting life-saving humanitarian aid. This is a moral stain that will stay with us for generations." Belgian foreign minister Alexander De Croo stated Israel was engaging in "tactics of starvation". The global humanitarian director of Plan International stated, "Israeli restrictions on aid... must cease immediately. The starvation of the civilian population is illegal under international humanitarian law." Jeremy Laurence, the UN Human Rights Office spokesman, stated Israel's conduct may constitute "starvation as a method of war, which is a war crime".

Ayman Safadi, the Foreign Minister of Jordan, stated, "Israel is weaponizing starvation. This is another horrific war crime." The Foreign Minister of the Republic of Ireland Micheál Martin stated, "The use of starvation as a weapon of war is a blatant violation of international humanitarian law." Caroline Gennez, Belgium's minister of development cooperation, stated Israel's use of hunger as weapon of war was a "flagrant violation of international law". A June 2024 investigation by The Independent found both current and former officials believed the United States was complicit in the creation of famine in Gaza. In July 2024, a group of ten UN special rapporteurs stated Israel had conducted a "targeted starvation campaign" which constituted "a form of genocidal violence". Michael Fakhri, the United Nations Special Rapporteur on the Right to Food, stated that Israel is using famine as a tactic of genocide. Fakhri stated, "Israel made its intentions to starve everyone in Gaza explicit, implemented its plans and predictably created a famine throughout Gaza. Tracking the geography of Israel's starvation tactics alongside Israeli officials' statements confirms its intent." In response to an Israeli bombing of four water engineers, Oxfam stated attacks on civilian infrastructure were "part of the crime of using starvation as a weapon of war."

On 21 November 2024, the International Criminal Court issued arrest warrants for Israeli prime minister Benjamin Netanyahu and the former defence minister Yoav Gallant. The judges wrote "The chamber considered that there are reasonable grounds to believe that both individuals intentionally and knowingly deprived the civilian population in Gaza of objects indispensable to their survival, including food, water, and medicine and medical supplies, as well as fuel and electricity" and that there are "reasonable grounds" that they bear criminal responsibility for "the war crime of starvation as a method of warfare". The United States expressed deep concern over the "troubling process errors" that led to the decision to issue the warrants, adding that the US "fundamentally rejects" the decision.

One of the key allegations in the International Criminal Court arrest warrants for Gallant and Netanyahu was the "use of starvation as a weapon of war". The use of starvation of civilians as weapon of war is banned by the United Nations. In mid 2023 German government officials accused Russia of using hunger as a weapon but have not commented on Israel's policies as of March 2024. Gallant made a public speech in early October 2023, shortly after the October 7 attack that sparked the war, saying, 'there will be no more electricity, no more food, no more fuel ... We are fighting against human animals and will behave accordingly'. A few weeks before that the arrest warrants were issued, there were also reports of looting occurring in areas controlled by the IDF.

Volker Türk, the UN high commissioner for human rights, stated that Israel's restrictions on the entry of aid may constitute starvation as a weapon of war, which would be a war crime. An Independent International Commission of Inquiry also found Israel was using starvation as a method of war. In April and May, USAID and the US State Department's Bureau of Population, Refugees and Migration determined that Israel was blocking food aid from entering Gaza. These findings were rejected by Secretary of State Blinken and the Biden Administration.

=== Israeli response ===
The Israeli government denied that it was using starvation as a weapon of war and said that it was not violating the Genocide Convention. COGAT, the Israeli agency responsible for allowing aid into Gaza, has stated Israel was not putting limits into the amount of aid entering Gaza. COGAT's claim has been challenged by multiple entities, including the European Union, United Nations, Oxfam, and United Kingdom. Since March 2025, Israel has made the blockade publicly official, with current defense minister Israel Katz declaring "no humanitarian aid will enter Gaza". Israel has claimed that "Hamas stockpiled supplies and kept them from increasingly desperate civilians," but, as of February 2024, the US has not received evidence supporting this claim. There have been reports of armed gangs stealing aid, and some of those stealing aid have been armed by Israel.

In August 2025, with the release of a video showing hostage Evyatar David in emaciated condition many Israeli officials, released hostages and the Israeli public used it as a rally cry to show that Hamas was stealing humanitarian aid and to downplay the famine. This was due to the Hamas members arm shown in the video which appears to be slightly larger than David's with former hostages stating after the video was released that Hamas fighters guarding them daily had meat, vegetables, fish and fruit that they stole from humanitarian aid packages.

== Israeli legal obligations ==
On 22 October 2025, the International Court of Justice issued an advisory opinion that Israel is legally obliged to ensure that Gaza (and the rest of Palestine, as an Israeli-occupied territory) "has the essential supplies of daily life, including food, water, clothing, bedding, shelter, fuel, medical supplies and services" and that Israeli is obliged to "co-operate in good faith with the United Nations by providing every assistance ... including UNRWA". Political scientist Juan Cole interpreted the advisory opinion as effectively declaring the Israeli food blockade illegal.

== Reactions ==
Israel's actions, according to its government, aim to neutralize Hamas as a security threat, including preventing military resources from being smuggled under the guise of humanitarian aid. Efforts to address the crisis include attempts to negotiate ceasefires and allow for the provision of aid, though challenges persist due to the continuation of hostilities and the difficulty in delivering aid amid the fighting.

On 5 August 2024, the far-right Israeli Finance Minister Bezalel Smotrich stated that he believes that blocking humanitarian aid to the Gaza Strip is "justified and moral" even if it causes two million Gazans to die of starvation, but the international community would not allow it to happen.

=== January 2024 ===
On 7 January, Secretary-General of the United Nations António Guterres stated "widespread famine looms" in Gaza. The UN special rapporteur for health Tlaleng Mofokeng responded to Guterres, stating Gaza was experiencing "deliberate starvation not famine". Speaking at the United Nations Security Council on 12 January, Martin Griffiths stated colleagues who had made it into northern Gaza in recent days had described "scenes of utter horror: Corpses left lying in the road. People with evident signs of starvation stopping trucks in search of anything they can get to survive."

On 11 January, the Israeli Coordinator of Government Activities in the Territories stated there was no hunger in Gaza. On 16 January, Michael Fakhri, the UN special rapporteur on food, stated, "What we're witnessing in Gaza is an entire civilian population made to go hungry... this is a result of Israeli bombardment, this is a result of the denial of humanitarian relief. We've never seen anything so brutal happen so quickly". Following a visit to the Rafah border crossing, US Senator Chris Van Hollen described the entry of humanitarian aid into Gaza as an "unnecessarily cumbersome process".

The heads of the WFP, UNICEF, and the World Health Organization issued a joint statement stating significantly more humanitarian aid was needed in Gaza. Mohammad Mustafa, the chief economist of the Palestine Investment Fund, stated, "Maybe more people will be killed or die from hunger and famine than the war itself." After major Western donors announced they were suspending funding of UNRWA, the agency stated "over 2 million people [are] depending on it for their sheer survival" as "hunger stalks everyone."

=== February 2024 ===
On 14 February, a joint statement by 14 major human rights organizations, including Action Against Hunger, ActionAid, Danish Refugee Council, Handicap International, INTERSOS, Islamic Relief, Mercy Corps, Norwegian Refugee Council, Plan International, Project HOPE, Save the Children, Solidarités International, and War Child UK stated, "The risk of famine is increasing each day in Gaza due to the continuation of hostilities, and the continued blockade of the Strip."

The American Friends Service Committee stated, "Everyone is hungry in Gaza today. That is just enormous and truly catastrophic, and we've never seen anything like that before." Alex de Waal, a British academic, stated, "There's no doubt that certain senior members of the Israel government and certain groups within Israeli society have the intent of starving Gaza." He further stated, "Nothing compares to Gaza over the last 75 years."

On 18 February, the heads of eight major humanitarian organizations—including the Norwegian Refugee Council, Mercy Corps, Refugees International, Oxfam America, CARE USA, Save the Children, Action Against Hunger, and Catholic Relief Services—wrote a joint op-ed, stating, "If the situation continues we will see one of the biggest disasters we have faced as humanitarians... this crisis will soon reach a tipping point, where emergency food aid won't be enough. Averting mass death becomes harder as starvation gains momentum." The Gaza Media Office stated on 20 February, "We hold the US administration and the international community additionally to Israel fully responsible for this famine."

On 21 February, WFP chief Cindy McCain stated, "A famine doesn't have to happen. But if things don't change, it will". Tor Wennesland stated on 22 February that more than 2 million people were facing extreme food insecurity. On 23 February, a UNOCHA official stated, "Famine is looming". The head of the Red Cross stated on 26 February: "80% of the population already faces emergency or catastrophic acute food insecurity conditions". Ramesh Rajasingham, the UN humanitarian affairs chief, stated that if nothing was done to change the status quo then "widespread famine in Gaza is almost inevitable". On 27 February, Michael Fakhri, the UN Special Rapporteur on the Right to Food, said that Gaza was going through a genocide and that there was "no reason to intentionally block the passage of humanitarian aid or intentionally obliterate small-scale fishing vessels, greenhouses and orchards in Gaza – other than to deny people access to food."

On 29 February, the humanitarian policy director of Oxfam America stated the organization was opposed to proposed US airdrops, stating, "Oxfam does not support US airdrops to Gaza, which would mostly serve to relieve the guilty consciences of senior US officials whose policies are contributing to the ongoing atrocities and risk of famine in Gaza".

The UN WFP warned of a real prospect of famine by May 2024, for half a million people.

=== March 2024 ===
A man in Rafah spoke to Al Jazeera, stating, "From the moment we wake up until the moment we sleep, we are battling to survive. We are fighting to get our hands on some water, to get hold of a loaf of bread for our children. We are exhausted, mentally and physically. This is unbearable." Save the Children released a statement saying children in Gaza were "forced to forage for scraps of food left by rats and eating leaves out of desperation. The risk of famine will increase so long as the government of Israel continues to impede the entry of aid." UNICEF responded to news of children dying from starvation, stating, "Now, the child deaths we feared are here and are likely to rapidly increase unless the war ends and obstacles to humanitarian relief are immediately resolved" On 5 March, UNOCHA stated that the first deaths of children from starvation in northern Gaza were "a warning like no other". A WFP director stated, "The is nowhere else in the world where so many people face imminent famine".

In The Guardian, global health expert Devi Sridhar wrote there was no precedent to the starvation in Gaza. Sridhar quoted an unnamed colleague, who stated there had never been another conflict in history "that used bombing, snipers, starvation all at once with such intensity". On 6 March, a UN official stated, "Ninety percent of the population today in Gaza is facing a high level of acute food insecurity". A medical student working as a doctor at Al-Shifa Hospital documented the first death by starvation in Gaza; he stated, "Do not talk to us again about human rights, I do not know where the world has reached in its brutality and cruelty." Gaza's civil defense criticized humanitarian aid drops, stating, "The method of using the dropping of aid via international relief planes has not limited the famine crisis". The EU's humanitarian aid chief Janez Lenarcic stated, "We already have a very strong and credible indication that there are pockets of famine already in the Gaza Strip."

A displaced Palestinian speaking to Al Jazeera English in late March stated, "The situation is so bad that no one can imagine it". Martin Griffiths stated the world should "hang its head in shame for failing to stop this". In a report, Islamic Relief stated, "Palestinians are not just starving; they are being starved". The International Rescue Committee, stated, "Children are starving due to an entirely man-made and preventable crisis. There is no excuse". Melanie Ward, the CEO of Medical Aid for Palestinians, stated, "If Israel would only let food aid in, we could stop the starvation immediately." Oxfam stated the imminent famine was the result of Israel's bombing of Gaza and "using starvation as a weapon of war".

Citing the IPC, the US Secretary of State acknowledged on 19 March: "100% of the population in Gaza is at severe levels of acute food insecurity. That's the first time an entire population has been so classified". Naledi Pandor, South Africa's Foreign Minister, stated that as famine set in, humanity needed to look at itself "in horror and dismay". Caroline Gennez, the Belgian Minister of Development, stated Israel would not defeat Hamas by using hunger as a weapon to starve civilians. The World Bank stated the "situation in the Gaza Strip has reached catastrophic levels". Rishi Sunak, the prime minister of the United Kingdom, stated under questioning: "We need urgent action now to avoid a famine". On 18 March 2024, the UN secretary-general António Guterres stated the imminent famine was an "entirely man-made disaster".

After the passage of UNSC Resolution 2728, the UN director of Human Rights Watch stated Israel needed to begin "facilitating the delivery of humanitarian aid, ending its starvation of Gaza's population, and halting unlawful attacks". A provisional measure issued by the International Court of Justice (ICJ) in South Africa v. Israel found "Palestinians in Gaza are no longer facing only a risk of famine... but that famine is setting in". David J. Simon, the Director of the Genocide Studies Program at Yale University, wrote, "Failing to act raises the possibility the [ICJ] will make a finding of genocide". Amnesty International responded to the ICJ's provisional measures, stating, "This new ruling must serve as a critical reminder to all states of their clear duty to prevent genocide".

=== April 2024 ===
A director of Save the Children stated, "Starvation must never be used as a weapon of war—27 children have already been killed by starvation and disease. If the world fails to act now countless more children will be added to that number." On 16 April, Andrea De Domenico, the head of UNOCHA in Palestine, stated, "We're dealing with this dance where we do one step forward, two steps backward, or two steps forward, one step backward, which leaves us basically always at the same point". On 23 April, David M. Satterfield, the US special envoy for humanitarian issues, stated that the risk of famine throughout Gaza, and especially in the north, was "very high". Gian Caro Cirri, a WFP director, stated, "There is reasonable evidence that all three famine thresholds – food insecurity, malnutrition and mortality—will be passed in the next six weeks." Carl Skau, the World Food Program deputy executive director, stated, "We are still heading toward famine. We haven't seen the paradigm shift that is needed to avert a famine".

=== May 2024 ===
On 4 May, Cindy McCain, the head of the WFP, stated in an interview with NBC News that Northern Gaza was in a "full-blown famine", and that it was "moving its way south". She said: "It's horror. It's so hard to look at and it's so hard to hear. What we are asking for and what we continually ask for is a ceasefire and the ability to have unfettered access, to get in safe through the various ports and gate crossings." A WFP spokesman later said that one of the three benchmarks for a formal famine declaration had been met. Human Rights Watch stated, "Despite children dying from starvation and famine in Gaza, the Israeli authorities are still blocking aid critical for the survival of Gaza's population in defiance of the World Court". The American Friends Service Committee stated, "There are 600,000 children on the edge of death."

=== June 2024 ===
Stacy Gilbert, a US State Department official who resigned in protest of the Biden's Administration's policies, stated it was "absolutely unanimous that Israel is blocking humanitarian assistance, which is why there's famine". The Middle East and North Africa director of Oxfam stated, "When hunger claims many more lives, nobody will be able to deny the horrifying impact of Israel's deliberate, illegal and cruel obstruction of aid". In an interview, the head of the Kamal Adwan Hospital stated, "We are reeling under famine, we are left with nothing but some quantities of white flour."

Israel has criticized the IPC's previous methodology, citing the revised June FRC report which stated that: "In contrast with the assumptions made for the projection period (March–July 2024), the amount of food and non-food commodities allowed into the northern governorates increased"; "Additionally, the response in the nutrition, water sanitation and hygiene (WASH) and health sectors was scaled up. In this context, the available evidence does not indicate that famine is currently occurring." A separate peer-reviewed study by Israeli public health academics analyzed data from all food shipments delivered into the Gaza Strip by land between January–July 2024 by COGAT, including the gross weight of each consignment and its content, concluded that the provisions entering Gaza were sufficient to provide the basic requirements of energy, protein and fat for the entire population. An independent study by researchers from Columbia university came to similar conclusions, though has not been peer-reviewed.

Arif Husain, the chief economist of WFP, stated that arguments about an official famine designation for Gaza were missing the point, as the situation was already dire for the territory's 2.3 million people.

=== July 2024 – present ===
In July 2024, US Vice President Kamala Harris stated in an interview that she was aware of reports that people were eating grass, as well as Gaza's lack of available clean water, stating, "You can't make shit with flour if you don't have clean water. So what's going on with that? I ask questions like, What are people actually eating right now?"

In August 2024, Bezalel Smotrich, the Israeli finance minister, stated, "We bring in aid because there is no choice... We can't, in the current global reality, manage a war. Nobody will let us cause 2 million civilians to die of hunger, even though it might be justified and moral". The European Union and foreign ministries of France and the UK condemned Smotrich's comments. Australian foreign minister Penny Wong stated, "The deliberate starvation of civilians is a war crime. There is no justification for it, ever." In October 2024, Oxfam warned that the effects of starvation were likely to last for generations.

On 2 October 2024, 99 American healthcare workers who have served in the Gaza Strip since 7 October 2023, sent US President Joe Biden, US Vice President Kamala Harris, and others a letter, cited in a paper from the Watson Institute for International and Public Affairs at Brown University, in which they said that based on starvation standards by the US-funded Integrated Food Security Phase Classification, according to the most conservative estimate that they could calculate based on the available data, at least 62,413 people in Gaza were likely to have died from starvation, most of them young children.

In April 2025, Israeli Defense Minister Israel Katz voiced support for the blockade of humanitarian aid to Gaza, stating, "Israel's policy is clear: no humanitarian aid will enter Gaza, and blocking this aid is one of the main pressure levers preventing Hamas from using it as a tool with the population."

On 16 May 2025, during the last day of his visit to the Gulf Arab states, President Donald Trump said, "We're looking at Gaza. And we're going to get that taken care of. A lot of people are starving" while in Abu Dhabi. In May 2025, the United Kingdom, France, and Canada threatened sanctions against Israel over Israel's blockade of humanitarian aid to the Gaza Strip.

On 25 July 2025, US Senator Bernie Sanders said in a statement: "Having already killed or wounded 200,000 Palestinians, mostly women and children, the extremist Israeli government is using mass starvation to engineer the ethnic cleansing of Gaza." On 26 July 2025, House Democratic Leader Hakeem Jeffries called on the Trump administration to pressure Israel to end the blockade, saying, "The starvation and death of Palestinian children and civilians in an ongoing war zone is unacceptable. The Trump administration has the ability to bring an end to this humanitarian crisis. They must act now." In July 2025, World Health Organization Director-General Tedros Adhanom Ghebreyesus said, "I don't know what you'd call it other than mass starvation. And it is man-made."

On 27 July 2025, Israeli Prime Minister Netanyahu claimed that there is "no starvation in Gaza, no policy of starvation in Gaza." Netanyahu's statement was contradicted by US President Trump, who admitted that people in Gaza were starving and declared that the US and its allies would establish barrier-free food centers in Gaza to assist with humanitarian aid deliveries.

On 30 July, resolutions proposed by Sanders that would block weapons to Israel failed, though were supported by the majority of the Senate Democratic Caucus; several moderate Democrats who had previously opposed blocking weapons voted for the resolutions over the increased level of starvation.

Irish Prime Minister Micheál Martin, Polish Prime Minister Donald Tusk, British Prime Minister Keir Starmer, French President Emmanuel Macron and German Chancellor Friedrich Merz accused Israel of starving the people of Gaza and urged an end to the blockade.

In August 2025, German newspapers Bild and Süddeutsche Zeitung published articles questioning the authenticity of photos from the Gaza Strip, with Bild accusing Anas Zayed Fteiha, a photojournalist working for Turkey's Anadolu Agency, of staging his photos of the famine. The articles were cited by Israel's Ministry of Foreign Affairs as evidence of "Pallywood". Fteiha denied the accusations and accused Bild of repeated breaches of journalistic ethics. He stated, "The photo they published to distort me is entirely real. It was taken during the filming of a documentary documenting the famine in Gaza, as children were scrambling for food or water. Everything in it was real, not staged or directed." The claims made in the Bild report were debunked by the Israeli fact-checking organization FakeReporter and the French newspaper Libération.

In response to the increasing number of deaths due to malnutrition, and heightened reporting, the IDF issued a statement on 12 August blaming the deaths on a deliberate campaign by Hamas to interfere with ceasefire negotiations. They also claimed reports obfuscated preexisting conditions. Experts interviewed by Haaretz on 13 August stated that such conditions do not preclude the cause of the deaths being due to starvation, and the existing conditions in Gaza can aggravate preexisting conditions. In August 2025, The Free Press investigated the pre-existing health problems of starving Palestinian children in an attempt to cast doubt on the famine.

In August 2025, Xaviaer DuRousseau and other American and Israeli social media influencers went on a paid trip to Gaza by the diaspora affairs ministry to film and share content from the distribution sites. According to Haaretz, the aim of the campaign is to "reveal the truth" about the conditions in Gaza. DuRousseau stated on Twitter, "There is enough food at this aid base to feed every person in Gaza for at least a week, but the UN, Hamas, etc refuse to distribute the food efficiently. Instead, it sits here to spoil and be stolen. How's that Israel's fault?".

In September 2025, Drop Site News reported that Google had signed a six-month, $45 million contract with the Israeli government in June to push its propaganda during the Gaza war, including content that denied the famine.

== See also ==
- Civilian victimization
- Criticism of Israel
- Gaza genocide
- Gaza humanitarian crisis
- Human rights in Israel
- Humanitarian aid during the Gaza war
- International aid to Palestinians
- Israeli apartheid
- Israeli direct action against aid delivery to Gaza
- State crime
- UNRWA
- War crimes in the Gaza war
- Water supply and sanitation in Palestine
- Winter of 2024–25 in the Gaza Strip
- World Central Kitchen
