= Winter of 2024–25 in the Gaza Strip =

Winter season in the Gaza Strip during Gaza war

- Cause: Winter storm, flooding, rising tide, with impacts exacerbated by ongoing Gaza war and blockade.

Meteorological history
- Duration: November 2024–March 2025

Winter storm
- Highest winds: 30 km/h (20 mph)
- Lowest pressure: 1011.2 hPa (mbar); 29.86 inHg
- Lowest temp: 7 °C (44.60 °F)

Overall effects
- Fatalities: ≥5
- Injuries: Several reports of cold-related sickness
- Damage: ~110,000 of 135,000 displacement tents damaged, destroyed, or washed away
- Areas affected: Gaza Strip, with a half million people in flood-susceptible areas

The winter of 2024–25 in the Gaza Strip (November 2024–March 2025) was marked by a humanitarian emergency due to over one million internally displaced Palestinians lacking adequate shelter amid winter storms leading to persistently cold temperatures and flooding. The crisis, exacerbated by Gaza war and severe restrictions on aid deliveries implemented by Israel on the Gaza Strip, left hundreds of thousands of families struggling to survive in makeshift shelters and tents as temperatures began to drop.

== Background ==
The Gaza Strip is 41 km (25 mi) long, from 6 to 12 km (3.7 to 7.5 mi) wide, and has a total area of 365 km^{2} (141 sq mi). Its terrain is flat or rolling, with dunes near the coast, and the highest point is Abu 'Awdah (Joz Abu 'Auda), at 105 m (344 ft) above sea level. The average temperature in Gaza during December is between 10 °C and 20 °C, and drops a few degrees lower in January.

== Vulnerability ==
The scale of displacement brought on by the constant bombardment of urban areas in the Gaza Strip combined with forced evacuations to crowded tent camps created devastating living conditions across the territory.

=== Destruction of infrastructure ===
By the onset of the winter season in November 2024, approximately 90% of Gaza's Palestinians—roughly 1.9 million people—had been displaced, while 60% of residential buildings damaged or destroyed, 80% of commercial facilities rendered unusable, and 68% of the road network compromised. The Norwegian Refugee Council (NRC) reported that many Palestinian households that had taken refuge in schools, hospitals, and public buildings during the winter of 2023-24 were forced to reside in improvised shelters constructed from whatever materials they could salvage, including tarpaulins, blankets, cardboard, and sewn-together rice sacks.

The NRC further elaborated that these makeshift dwellings offered minimal protection against winter conditions, with temperatures expected to fall to 6 °C by December. Such temperatures in conjunction with strong winds and significant rainfall typically present between December and February were predicted to lead to increased health risks, particularly with respiratory infections and infectious diseases. Many winter survival essentials, including blankets, mattresses, and improved shelter materials, were low or minimal in supply across refugee camps in Gaza.

=== Flooding risk ===
Historical patterns since 2008 indicated a high probability of severe flooding, a threat magnified by the extensive damage to infrastructure. Approximately 850,000 people occupied flood-prone areas, facing potential secondary displacement and increased exposure to various hazards. With severely diminished wastewater management capacity due to infrastructure damage and fuel shortages, winter rainfall threatened to exacerbate exposure to contaminated water sources.

=== Food insecurity ===
The impact of the winter climate was exacerbated by concurrent food insecurity across the Gaza Strip. At the beginning of the winter season, over two million Palestinians faced insufficient food supplies, with 86 percent experiencing crisis-level food shortages. Of these, approximately 133,000 people encountered catastrophic levels of hunger. Malnutrition from lack of calorie intake was exacerbated by additional calories burnt due to exposure to the cold.

=== Healthcare collapse ===
By October 2024, more than half of Gaza's hospitals—19 out of 36—had ceased operations, while the remaining 17 functioned at partial capacity. The loss of approximately 1,000 health workers since October 2023 severely compromised the territory's ability to respond to the anticipated surge in winter-related illnesses.

=== Secondary health impacts ===
Several health risks intensified due to survival measures against the cold. Severe fuel shortages led many families to burn plastic for heating and cooking, releasing dangerous substances including dioxins and polycyclic aromatic hydrocarbons into the atmosphere. This practice significantly elevated the risk of respiratory and cardiovascular diseases among a population already vulnerable to health issues.

Overcrowding in available shelters presented another critical concern. The combination of cold weather and dense living conditions created ideal conditions for the spread of respiratory infections and other communicable diseases. The situation was further complicated by increased fire risks, as displaced families resorted to burning materials for cooking and heating within inadequately equipped shelters.

== Impact ==
In several refugee camps such as those in Gaza City's Yarmouk Stadium, displaced residents from northern regions such as Jabalia and Beit Lahia reported severe health impacts and sickness from persistent exposure to rain and cold.

On 25 November 2024, the Gaza Government Media Office reported that during the past day, approximately 10,000 tents sheltering internally displaced persons were destroyed or damaged by winter storms that caused flooding in conjunction with rising tides. Field assessment teams documented that 81 percent of shelter structures had become unsuitable for habitation in part due to the winter storm, with 110,000 of 135,000 total tents requiring immediate replacement.

Many remaining temporary shelters were inundated with rainwater. Many individuals, previously relocated multiple times due to conflict, attempted to protect their limited possessions by implementing makeshift drainage systems and placing containers to collect water from leaking shelters. The United Nations Relief and Works Agency for Palestine Refugees (UNRWA) identified half a million individuals at risk in flood-susceptible areas. Due to the ongoing war, the cost of new tents and weatherproofing materials increased beyond the financial capacity of displaced families, preventing them from securing adequate replacement shelters.

On the same day, the Palestinian Civil Emergency Service reported that thousands of displaced individuals in a Khan Yunis refugee encampment were impacted by severe flooding during the night of 24 November 2024. Several refugees, including children, required rescue after being swept away by floodwaters. The flooding destroyed belongings and basic necessities, including cooking equipment, bedding materials, and shelter components. A school in the same city housing refugees was also impacted, with floodwaters spoiling flour and damaging bread-making equipment used to provide food to refugees.

=== December 2024 ===
On 5 December 2024, heavy rainfall caused extensive flooding across Gaza. Assessment reports by the International Rescue Committee indicated significant damage to refugee camps, with 40% of tents destroyed in Asdaa camp and 45% in Ard Fayyad camp.

On 26 December, Palestinian doctors reported that four infants "froze to death" over the prior three days due to inadequate warming in displacement camp shelters as temperatures fell.

On 27 December, a Gaza European Hospital health worker was found dead in his tent in al-Mawasi after succumbing to "'extreme' weather conditions".

On 28 December, the Government Media Office issued a report stating that strong winter winds and heavy rainfall had "completely deteriorated" 110,000 out of 135,000 tents used as shelter by displaced Palestinians, rendering them unusable.

== Response ==
Several international aid organizations mounted humanitarian responses to mitigate the impact of the winter on Palestinian civilians, including providing essential supplies to more than 120,000 people and distributing cash assistance to 66,000 Palestinians. However, aid workers emphasized that these efforts, while crucial, remained insufficient given the scale of the crisis.

== See also ==
- Gaza humanitarian crisis (2023–present)
- Israeli blockade of aid delivery to the Gaza Strip
- Weather of 2024
