= Israeli direct action against aid delivery to Gaza =

2024 civilian protests during Gaza humanitarian crisis

Israeli blockade of humanitarian aid delivery to the Gaza Strip
- Part of the Gaza war and the Israeli–Palestinian conflict
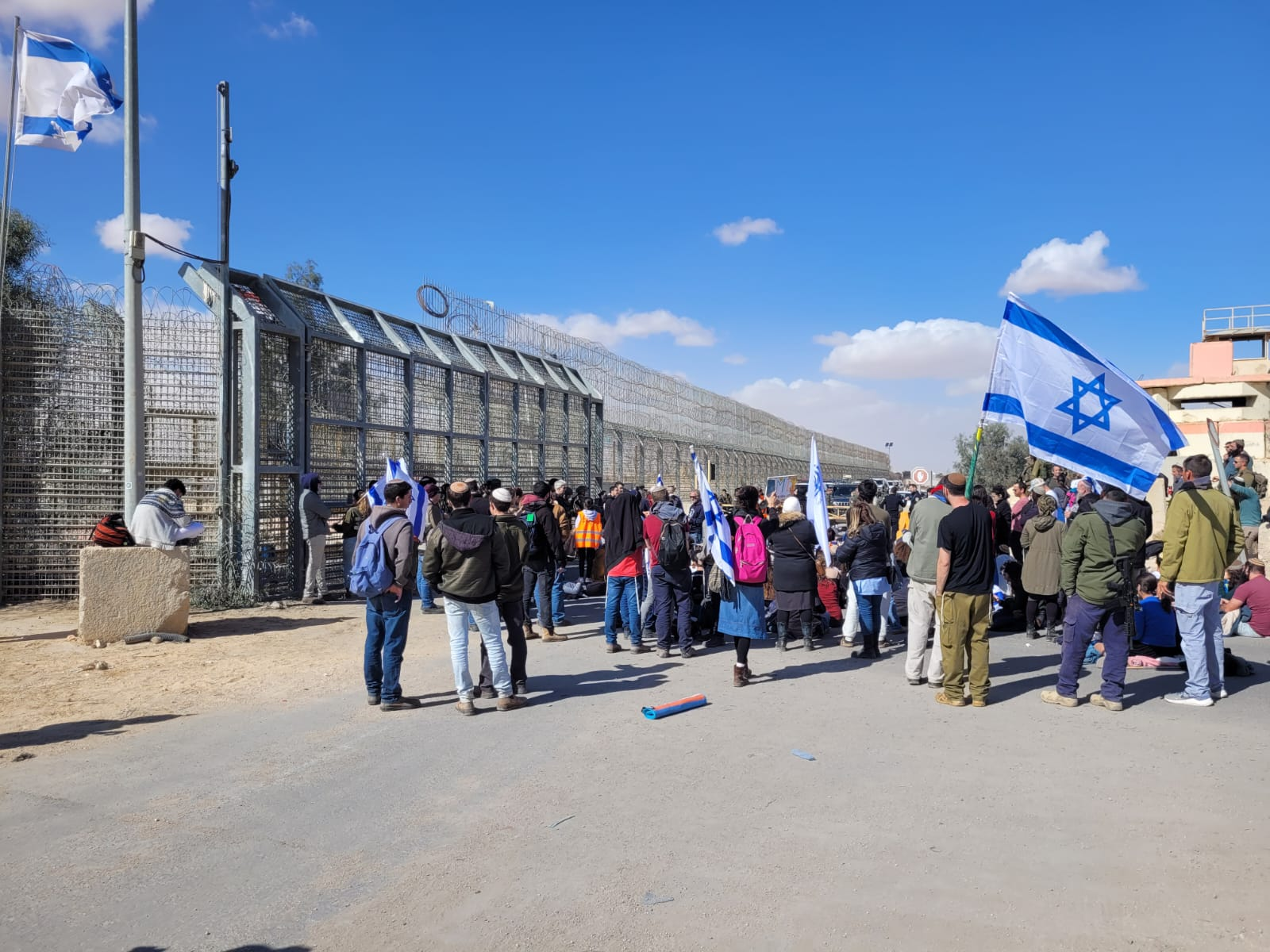
- Protesters blocking humanitarian aid trucks to the Gaza Strip at the Kerem Shalom crossing
- Date: January 24, 2024 – present
- Location: Kerem Shalom crossing, Nitzana Border Crossing, Port of Ashdod, Taba Border Crossing
- Caused by: Transfer of humanitarian aid to the Gaza Strip by Israel during wartime before all Israeli hostages were returned
- Goals: Stopping humanitarian aid to the Gaza Strip
- Methods: Blocking aid trucks; Raiding and destroying aid cargo; Violence against truck drivers
- Result: Completely halted or significantly limited aid delivery on several days

Casualties
- Injuries: 5
- Arrested: 52
- Damage: Nine trucks vandalized; Three trucks set on fire

Israeli demonstrators have blocked aid delivery to the Gaza Strip since January 24, 2024. The demonstrators prevented the passage of humanitarian aid to the Gaza Strip at the Kerem Shalom crossing, at the Nitzana crossing, at the Port of Ashdod, and on the roads that aid trucks traveled on.

The demonstrations were initiated by the "Tsav 9", "Warrior Mothers", and "Forum Tikva" groups to protest the transfer of supplies to the Gaza Strip as well as to prevent the actual entry of the supply trucks, with the intention of putting pressure on Hamas to release the hostages who were kidnapped during the 2023 Hamas-led attack on Israel.

In the first days of the protests, the blockades focused primarily on the Kerem Shalom crossing, where the aid trucks crossed into the Gaza Strip from Israeli territory. After the commander of the Southern Command declared the crossing a closed military area, the activists moved to block the Nitzana crossing and the Ashdod port.

== Background ==
Following the Hamas surprise attack on Israel, Israel initiated the Gaza war by bombing and invading the Gaza Strip. The declared goals of the war were the destruction of Hamas' military power, the removal of securitiy threats from the Gaza Strip to Israel, and the return of its kidnapped hostages. Initially, Israel declared the imposition of a complete blockade on Gaza, under which water, food, and humanitarian equipment would not be allowed to enter. However, following international pressure, Israel allowed the entry of trucks carrying humanitarian aid into the Gaza Strip from Egypt through the Rafah crossing. Later, following further pressure, Israel allowed the entry of aid trucks from Israeli territory through the Kerem Shalom crossing, which provoked widespread public criticism in Israel, and led to the organization of civil movements to prevent the entry of aid from Israeli territory.

=== The humanitarian crisis ===
As part of efforts to exert pressure against Hamas with the aim of bringing about the collapse of the organization and the release of approximately 240 civilians and soldiers who were abducted to the Gaza Strip, Israel started a war in Gaza and imposed a blockade on the entry of supplies to it, which according to the United Nations, caused a humanitarian crisis. The siege and fighting resulted in a 90% drop in the availability of electricity, most of which was provided by the Israel Electric Corporation until the start of the war. This decrease significantly affected the electricity supply to the hospitals, and caused a shutdown of Gazan sewage systems and desalination facilities that supplied the region with drinking water, which increased the spread of diseases and the likelihood of infection outbreaks throughout Gaza. While several sources in Israel claimed that there was no humanitarian crisis in Gaza at the beginning of the war, the humanitarian crisis quickly worsened and led to mass starvation in the Gaza Strip.

On January 6, 2024, the UN Office for the Coordination of Humanitarian Affairs announced that the Gaza Strip had become an uninhabitable place to live in. On February 27, the ministry said that a quarter of the population of the Gaza Strip, about 576,000 people, were on the brink of severe mass starvation. In early March 2024, medical officials in Gaza claimed that there were children who died due to malnutrition and dehydration.

=== Humanitarian aid ===
Two weeks after the start of the war on October 21, Israel allowed the entry of about twenty trucks carrying humanitarian aid into the Gaza Strip from Egypt through the Rafah crossing. On October 31, United States President Joe Biden and Israeli Prime Minister Benjamin Netanyahu agreed to increase the number of trucks that could enter the Gaza Strip to about 100 a day. However, Netanyahu convinced Biden to not allow fuel shipments into the Gaza Strip due to its potential of serving Hamas. Netanyahu stated that "the humanitarian aid does not belong to Israel, but to international entities. It is food and medicine that are physically inspected and monitored by Israeli security forces and pass through Egypt. All shipments are intended for the civilian population - and if it turns out that they are taken by Hamas, they will be stopped."

Several nations began dropping prepackaged food and medical supplies onto Gaza's coast. On March 2, the United States launched an operation to bring food into the Gaza Strip, and airdropped humanitarian aid shipments containing over 38,000 meals near the village of al-Mawasi in the southern Gaza Strip. Jordan and France also airdropped food to the Gaza Strip.

The quantities that were dropped by the United States and other countries were small compared to what the Gazan population needed to avoid malnutrition, dehydration, and disease. As a result, the United States began building a temporary floating pier in Gaza, to which supplies arrived from the port of Larnaca in Cyprus directly to Gaza. The floating dock began operating on May 17, and transferred 6,206 tons of humanitarian aid until the end of June. The pier was later disassembled in part due to delivery difficulties and maintenance problems such as the disconnection of parts of the port and their drifting towards the shores of Israel.

On 21 December 2023, Israeli activists attempted to block the Kerem Shalom crossing to prevent humanitarian aid from entering the Gaza Strip. On 9 January, captives' families were stopped by police trying to block humanitarian aid. On 19 January, families of captives promised "extreme actions", including blocking humanitarian aid.

== Blockade ==
=== January 2024 ===
Beginning on January 24, 2024, the "Tsav 9" movement led the blockade of the aid trucks at the Kerem Shalom crossing intended to bring humanitarian equipment into the Gaza Strip, The group blocked shipments in protest of the aid being brought into the Gaza Strip before the captured hostages were returned to their homes, and claiming that Hamas was taking over the shipment contents to meet the needs of its operatives while fighting against IDF soldiers. Only nine aid trucks entered the Gaza Strip on the first day of the blockade out of sixty that were waiting to enter, passing the activists before reaching the crossing.

On January 28, Israeli security forces prevented protest groups from blocking the crossing, allowing several trucks to enter Gaza. A short time later, the protestors bypassed the security barriers on foot, and blocked the rest of the trucks. The trucks were then directed to the Nitzana crossing, but the protestors arrived there as well and blocked the trucks. Following the bypassing of the checkpoints, Major General of the Southern Command Yaron Finkelman decided to expand the restricted military area in such a way that it would prevent the protesters' access to the Kerem Shalom crossing. The next day, despite military plans, the demonstrators attempted to reach the Kerem Shalom crossing, leading to thirteen of them being arrested. After their removal, 129 aid trucks entered the Gaza Strip on that day. On January 30, the protestors blocked the Nitzana crossing after marching there on foot due to a roadblock on Highway 40. On that day, Benny Gantz and Gadi Eisenkot stated they were examining limiting humanitarian aid into Gaza.

On January 31, the eighth day of the blockades, large forces of police accompanied by horse riders blocked approximately 300 protesters who entered the area of the restricted military area at the Kerem Shalom crossing, and allowed the passage of aid trucks to the Gaza Strip while using force to repel the protesters. According to a police statement, thirty demonstrators were detained during the protests.

On the same day, a petition was submitted to the Supreme Court of Israel against the commander of the Southern Command, claiming that the declaration of the Kerem Shalom and Nitzana crossings as restricted military areas was made for non-security reasons, in order to prevent political protests by civilians. In addition, National Security minister Itamar Ben-Gvir called on Netanyahu to cease sending aid to Gaza.

=== February 2024 ===
On 1 February, following the announcement of restricted military areas around the crossings to the Gaza Strip, the protestors announced a blockade of the Port of Ashdod, from where the aid supplies arrived for the trucks that take them to Kerem Shalom. Knesset member Zvi Sukot also participated in the blockade of the port. On 2 February, protesters blocked the Nitzana Border Crossing.

On February 6, the police stopped a bus with about fifty protesters on their way to block the Kerem Shalom crossing. A police officer got on the bus and ordered the driver to go to the police station in Netivot. The police stated that "as part of the police activity to enforce a restricted military area, the police called the bus driver to stop his journey. After he did not respond to their call, they detained the driver who refused to identify himself to them. Due to his refusal as mentioned, he was detained at the police station in order to identify him, and after an investigation he was released. We will emphasize that none of the bus passengers were detained." On that day, the protesters blocked 130 trucks. At night, tents were spread on the road to block trucks that were arriving at dawn. Throughout the next night, hundreds of protesters slept in tents near the Kerem Shalom crossing, and continued to block the trucks. On Friday, 9 February 2024, the 17th day of the blockades, dozens of protesters blocked the Nitzana crossing for trucks to enter the Gaza Strip, after spending hours in the area during the night between Thursday and Friday. Protesters blocked the Karem Abu Salem crossing on 12 February.

On February 14, the Tsav 9 movement published photos of vests and helmets that were part of the supplies. According to the coordinator of government operations, the presence of these items in the humanitarian aid shipments was not about smuggling equipment to Hamas. Instead, they were claimed to have been transported as personal protective equipment that was provided at the request of the Red Cross exclusively to foreign teams. The equipment was kept in transit while the request was being examined by security officials. On the same day, an individual blocking humanitarian aid from entering Gaza stated, "We cannot give them good foods".

UNOCHA reported that only twenty trucks of aid entered Gaza on 17 February. On February 18, following the blockades, no aid trucks entered at all through the Nitzana crossing, and 123 trucks entered through the Kerem Shalom crossing, representing about half of the amount that entered the day before. On February 19, the blockades continued at the Nitzana crossing, with reports stating that humanitarian aid entering Gaza had experienced a "clear decline" since the start of the month. On February 22, thirty protesters were repelled from the Kerem Shalom crossing. On February 27, hundreds of activists arrived and blocked the entrance of aid trucks to the Gaza Strip through the Nitzana crossing.

Reports that were released in mid-March 2024 stated that Israeli border officers had allowed protesters to disrupt humanitarian aid convoys for weeks at the Kerem Shalom crossing. However, at the end of February 2024 it was reported that due to mounting international pressures and condemnation they created a restricted military zone around the border crossings. The protesters are part of over two-thirds of the Jewish Israeli population that are opposed to the sending of humanitarian aid to Gaza, per a February 2024 survey done by the Israeli Democracy Institute. Israeli military and police officers were reportedly tipping off the activists and settlers on the location of the humanitarian aid trucks.

=== May 2024 ===
In early May 2024, Israeli settlers attacked a humanitarian aid shipment traveling to the Erez crossing, according to the Jordanian Foreign Ministry.

On May 13, 2024, protesters blocked dozens of aid trucks destined for Gaza at the Tarqumiyah crossing in Hebron Hills. Some of the aid was spilled and thrown from the truck during the blockade by right-wing protesters, leading to police arresting four people including one minor, but after the police left, two aid trucks were set ablaze. Tzav 9 claimed responsibility for the blockade, vowing: "No aid goes through until the last of the hostages returns." Tzav 9 further provided a quote from an Israeli that stated: "Blocking the trucks is a noble and understandable act for anyone with a sound mind.", and stated that "The aid that the State of Israel transfers goes directly into the hands of Hamas" The aid delivery workers said that the aid convoy's escort of Israeli soldiers did nothing to prevent the attack by Israeli settlers, with one aid worker stating that the convoy travelled on a "special army road that civilians could not cross", but was attacked by "at least 400 settlers", who were "throwing stones" and dumping aid, while the Israeli "army did not provide us with any kind of protection", despite being "present and watching what was happening. The army was at the service of the settlers." Videos of the protest circulated online that showed Israeli protestors throwing supplies from the truck on the ground.

On the same day, protesters blocked the Latrun Interchange to stop humanitarian aid delivery, leading to four protesters being arrested. The mayor of Mitzpe Ramon joined the blocking of humanitarian aid into Gaza.

On May 15, some activists blocked a truck they believed was carrying aid to the Gaza Strip, set its tires on fire, and threw stones at it. The truck driver suffered a head injury and was taken into medical care. It later turned out that the truck was not transporting aid to the Gaza Strip. In response to the activists' acts of violence, the Tsav 9 movement published a statement according to which "there were several events in which acts were committed that we do not encourage. We are opposed to violence of any kind and harm to the members of the security forces", and announced that they were "maintaining a renewed preparation for the continuation of the activity".

On May 17, activists tried to block a truck that they suspected was transporting aid to the Gaza Strip and threw stones at the driver. The truck driver tried to escape and hit a number of vehicles as he drove away, and was finally halted and attacked by far-right activists near Kokhav HaShahar, catching the driver off guard. A military force that came to the rescue of the driver was beaten by the activists, resulting in two officers and another fighter being slightly injured in the incident. The head of the Binyamin Council, Israel Gantz, condemned the violence of the activists in addition to the rabbi of the Kochav HaShahar settlement.

On May 19, dozens of Israelis gathered in Evyatar, stopped a Palestinian truck that they suspected was transporting aid to the Gaza Strip, and vandalized its equipment. On May 20, it was announced that teenagers from the "We will not forget" (Hebrew: לא נשכח) organization were the main people responsible for the escalation of the protest and the use of violence during the blockade of the aid trucks after the Tsav 9 movement disowned the burning of the trucks. The publication claims that the organization's operatives received advance information about the route the aid trucks planned to take by employees of the crossings' authority, as well as by soldiers and policemen.

BBC News reported in late May 2024: "Right-wing activists, including Jewish settlers living in the occupied West Bank, have uploaded dozens of videos of crowds, including some very young children, hurling food onto the ground and stamping on boxes of aid" meant for Gaza. Other videos, BBC News describes, "show Israeli vigilantes stopping lorries in Jerusalem and demanding that drivers show papers proving they are not transporting aid to Gaza. Their faces are uncovered and they appear to be acting with complete impunity." Peace activists, both Jews and Arab, have mobilised in an attempt to protect the aid; these peace activists have claimed that text messages exist showing aid-attacking activists asking for and gaining help from the Israeli police and the Israeli army.

=== June 2024 ===
In June 2024, the Palestine Red Crescent Society stated Israel was blocking humanitarian aid from entering through the Rafah crossing, in violation of ICJ orders. On June 13, the Commissioner of Israel Police Kobi Shabtai informed Attorney General of Israel Gali Baharav-Miara that the Minister of National Security, Itamar Ben-Gvir, had directly instructed his Deputy Commissioner Superintendent Avshalom Peled, to refrain from providing security for the aid convoys to the Gaza Strip. According to him, when he approached Ben-Gvir on the subject, the minister threatened him after he refused.

=== October 2024 ===
The head of the Palestinian refugee agency UNRWA reported in mid October that Israeli authorities were preventing humanitarian missions from reaching the northern Gaza area. Israeli officials did not initially respond, but later claimed that they had been delivering large amounts of humanitarian supplies into Gaza through land deliveries and air drops.

In late October Israeli lawmakers passed two laws which threatened the abilities for UNRWA to deliver humanitarian aid. The first law banned UNRWA from conducting any activity or providing any service inside Israel and the second would sever Israeli's diplomatic ties with the agency.

=== February 2025 ===
In the midst of the Gaza ceasefire and hostage exchange, Israeli officials reported that they were stopping all aid from entering the Gaza Strip in an effort to pressure Hamas to accept updated terms for the second phase of the ceasefire. Netanyahu's office threatened further consequences if Hamas did not accept the new terms, which included the continued release of hostages. Hamas officials reportedly agreed to the terms but had wanted a permanent ceasefire, withdrawal of Israeli forces and release of more Palestinian prisoners.

=== May 2025 ===
On 21 May, members from the Tzav 9 and the Israeli Reservists - Generation of Victory attempted to block aid from entering to Gaza at the Kerem Shalom crossing. Israeli police later arrested a protester for trying to block the road, and another for failing to listen to police instructions and obstructing police officers.

=== October 2025 ===
The ceasefire between Israel and Hamas went into effect on 10 October 2025. Under the ceasefire terms, Israel was to permit up to 600 humanitarian aid trucks to enter Gaza each day. Since then, the limit has been reduced to 300, with Israeli officials attributing the change to delays in recovering the bodies of Israeli hostages believed to be buried beneath rubble from Israeli strikes. Data from the UN2720 Monitoring and Tracking Dashboard, which records the movement of humanitarian convoys entering Gaza, showed that between 10 and 16 October, only 216 trucks reached their intended destinations within Gaza. Israel closed the Rafah border crossing, which is used for aid deliveries, on 14 October for two days; the closure was later extended, and as of 19 October it remains in effect indefinitely.

== Reactions ==
The actions to stop the aid trucks drew condemnations from the governments of the United States, Jordan, Great Britain, and Germany. United States National Security Advisor Jake Sullivan strongly condemned the attacks, stating that "It is a total outrage that there are people who are attacking and looting these convoys coming from Jordan going to Gaza to deliver humanitarian assistance. We are looking at the tools that we have to respond to this. And we are also raising our concerns at the highest level of the Israeli government".

On May 23, 2024, Facebook removed videos and posts published by the Tsav 9 movement on the grounds of "organized harm and promotion of crime" and blocked the possibility of re-publishing the account and its content. Instagram also suspended the activity of the movement's page.

On June 14, 2024, the United States government announced that it was imposing sanctions on the Tsav 9 organization. A spokesperson's announcement said: "For months, individuals from Tzav 9 have repeatedly sought to thwart the delivery of humanitarian aid to Gaza, including by blockading roads, sometimes violently, along their route from Jordan to Gaza, including in the West Bank." Among the imposed sanctions included the freezing of the organization's assets in the United States as well as a ban on the ability for any American to transact with it. The United States government also criticized the Israeli government, asserting that it was responsible for ensuring the safety of the humanitarian convoys passing through its territory. On July 11, financial sanctions were also imposed on two activists in the organization: Reot Ben Haim and Aviad Sharid.

On July 14, 2024, the European Union imposed sanctions against five individuals and three organizations, including the Tsav 9 organization.

In June 2025, France opened an investigation into French-Israelis involved in blocking aid for "complicity in genocide" and "incitement to genocide". In February 2026, a French investigating magistrate issued arrest warrants to two French-Israeli women, Nili Kupfer-Naouri and Rachel Touitou, in allegations of blocking the delivery of humanitarian aid to Gaza.

== See also ==
- 2024 Israeli protests
- Civilian victimization
- Deficiency (medicine)
- Emaciation
- Famine
- Far-right politics
- Far-right politics in Israel
- Gaza genocide
- Human right to water and sanitation
- Hunger
- International aid to Palestinians
- Psychology of genocide
- Right to health
- Starvation
- Starvation (crime)
- Structural inequality
- Structural violence
- Terminal dehydration
- World food crises (2022–present)
