= Civilian victimization =

Violence targeting noncombatants in war

Civilian victimization is the intentional use of violence against noncombatants in a conflict. It includes both lethal forms of violence (such as killings), as well as non-lethal forms of violence such as torture, forced expulsion, and rape. According to this definition, civilian victimization is only a subset of harm that occurs to civilians during conflict, excluding that considered collateral damage of military activity. However, "the distinction between intentional and unintentional violence is highly ambivalent" and difficult to determine in many cases.

Scholars have identified various factors that may either provide incentives for the use of violence against civilians, or create incentives for restraint. Violence against civilians occurs in many types of civil conflict, and can include any acts in which force is used to harm or damage civilians or civilian targets. It can be lethal or nonlethal. During periods of armed conflict, there are structures, actors, and processes at a number of levels that affect the likelihood of violence against civilians.

Violence towards civilians is not “irrational, random, or the result of ancient hatreds between ethnic groups.” Rather, violence against civilians may be used strategically in a variety of ways, including attempts to increase civilian cooperation and support; increase costs to an opponent by targeting their civilian supporters; and physically separate an opponent from its civilian supporters by removing civilians from an area.

Patterns of violence towards civilians can be described at a variety of levels and a number of determinants of violence against civilians have been identified.

== Describing patterns of violence ==
Francisco Gutiérrez-Sanín and Elisabeth Jean Wood have proposed a conceptualization of political violence that describes an actor in terms of its pattern of violence, based on the "repertoire, targeting, frequency, and technique in which it regularly engages." Actors can include any organized group fighting for political objectives. Repertoire covers the forms of violence used; targeting identifies those attacked in terms of social group; frequency is the measurable occurrence of violence; and techniques are the types of weapons or technology used. This framework can be applied to observed patterns of violence without considering the intentionality of the actor. Other frameworks focus on motivation of the actor.

Repertoires may include both lethal forms of violence against civilians such as killings, massacres, bombings, and terrorist attacks, and nonlethal forms of violence, such as forced displacement and sexual violence. In indirect violence heavy weapons such as tanks or fighter planes are used remotely and unilaterally. In direct violence perpetrators act face-to-face with the victims using small weapons such as machetes or rifles.

Targets may be chosen collectively, as members of a particular ethnic, religious, or political group. This is sometimes referred to as categorical violence. Targets may also be chosen selectively, identifying specific individuals who are seen as opposing a political group or aiding its opponents.

Techniques can vary greatly depending on the level of technology and amount of resources available to combatants. There are considerable impacts of technology over time, including the introduction of new technologies of rebellion. For example, changes in communication infrastructure may affect violence against civilians. If such technology facilitates organization by armed groups and increases contests over territory, violence against civilians in those areas is also likely to increase. As government surveillance of digital information increases, the use of targeted, selective violence against civilians by governments has been shown to increase.

== Analysis of levels of violence ==
Theoretical explanations at various levels of analysis can co-exist and interact with one another. The following levels of analysis can be useful in understanding such dynamics:

=== International ===
At the international level, institutions, ideologies and the distribution of power and resources shape technologies of rebellion and political interactions, including both international and domestic wars. During the Cold War, the United States and the Soviet Union provided military and financial backing to both governments and rebellious groups, who engaged in irregular civil wars. Such conflicts frequently involve the use of violence to control civilians and territory. The decade following the dissolution of the Soviet Union was marked by a decline in worldwide battle deaths and the number of armed conflicts in the world.

International norms and ideas also influence conflict and the use of violence against civilians. The period following World War II, from 1946 to 2013, has also been regarded as showing a decline in conflict. The United Nations General Assembly adopted the Universal Declaration of Human Rights in 1946. International actors signed the Genocide Convention in 1948 and the Geneva Conventions in 1949, formalizing protections for noncombatants and international norms for human rights and humanitarian standards. Transnational non-governmental organizations such as Human Rights Watch and Amnesty International have become active in surfacing information, advocating for human rights, mobilizing international public opinion, and influencing both social norms and international law.

Interactions between foreign governments and rebel groups who receive their support can affect violence against civilians. Groups receiving external support become less dependent on local civilian populations and have less incentive to limit violence against civilians. Foreign aid to rebels is associated with higher levels of both combat-related death and civilian targeting. However, foreign actors that are democracies or have strong human rights lobbies are less likely to support groups that engage in violence against civilians.

The international strategic environment also shapes government perceptions of threat. Perceptions of threat due to external military intervention may lead to increases in governmental mass killing of civilians and violence against domestic out-groups.

The scrutiny and criticism of international and domestic actors can affect government use of violence, by increasing the perceived costs of violence against civilians. Governments and rebel groups that are vulnerable domestically and that seek international legitimacy are more likely to comply with international humanitarian law and exercise restraint toward civilians.

=== Domestic and subnational ===
Political organization occurs not just at a national level, but at many levels, including provinces, states, legislative districts, and cities. In many countries, national and local politics differ in scale and in the extent to which subnational governments afford and support their citizen's political rights and civil liberties.

Relationships between government (at various levels), armed groups and domestic populations affect violence against civilians. Governments that rely on a broad base of domestic and institutional support are more likely to exercise restraint toward civilians. These may include democratic governments, inclusive governments, and governments in which institutions have not consolidated power.

Similarly, rebel groups that need the support of a broad domestic constituency or of local civilians are less likely to target civilians and to engage in terrorism. Rebel groups whose political constituents live in the area that they control are more likely to use governance structures like elections to obtain cooperation and less likely to use political violence. Rebel groups that control areas inhabited by nonconstituents are more likely to use violence to obtain resources and cooperation.

Ideology may strongly influence the ways in which governments and rebels define their constituencies, affecting patterns of violence. Where national, subnational or local institutions follow exclusionary ideologies, ethnic or other out-groups may become identified as nonconstituents and targeted, sometimes to the point of displacement, ethnic cleansing or genocide.

Violence against civilians may vary over space and time with the extent to which military forces are contesting a territory. Stathis Kalyvas has theorized that selective violence is more likely to occur where control is asymmetric, with one group exercising dominant but not complete control of an area. Indiscriminate violence may be more likely to occur where one side controls an area. It has also been shown that indiscriminate violence is more likely to occur at a distance from a country's center of power.

Opinions differ widely on whether there is a relationship between the relative military capacity of a government or rebel group and the likelihood that it will engage in patterns of violence against civilians. This may also vary depending on the type of violence involved. However, there is evidence that cutting off access to external sources of support may cause a group to become more dependent on the support of its local population and less likely to engage in violence against civilians.

=== Organizational ===
At the organizational level, researchers have examined the dynamics and ideology of armed groups: how they recruit and train their members, how organizational norms about the use of violence against civilians are established and maintained, and the role of group leaders and political ideology in shaping organizations and behavior. While some studies argue that violence against civilians reflects a lack of control over an organization's members and the absence of norms that inhibit violence, other researchers emphasize the social dynamics of armed groups and ways in which they may actively break down social norms that inhibit violence.

Jeremy Weinstein has argued that armed groups develop certain organizational structures and characteristics as a result of their available resources. According to this view, organizations that depend on external resources are predicted to attract low-commitment members, and have trouble controlling their use of violence against civilians. Organizations that are dependent on local resources will tend to attract higher-commitment, ideologically motivated members from local communities, which will help to control their use of violence against civilians.

Other researchers focus on organizational structure and its effects on behavior, without assuming that they are driven by resource endowment. They suggest that processes of education, training, and organizational control are important both in producing strategic violence and in establishing restraints against the use of violence against civilians.

The ideology of armed groups is a key factor influencing both their organizational structure and member behavior. Some Marxist groups, which emphasize political education, have been less likely to use violence against civilians. The ideology of other armed groups, including governments, can actively promote violence and direct it at particular targets. Such groups often use "exclusionary ethnic or national ideologies or narratives" which have resulted in mass killings and genocide.

Accounts from multiple countries have documented the "practice, norms, and other socialization processes" which armed groups have used to gain recruits, socialize group members, establish new norms of behavior and build group cohesion. Methods can include forced recruitment, systematic brutalization, and gang rape. Such groups create a “culture of violence” in which "horrifying acts of cruelty" are directed at both group members and civilians and become routine. The risk to civilians from such organizations is high.

=== Individual ===
On an individual level, people may be influenced to participate in armed conflicts due to economic motivations or incentive structures. Research in this area often views violence against civilians as a by-product of economic processes such as competition for resources.

Researchers have also studied emotional and psychological factors relating to the use of violence, which are generally related to other factors such as strategy, opportunity, socialization, and other group-level processes. The emotions of shame, disgust, resentment, and anger have been linked to violence against civilians. While research suggests that emotions such as fear affect the polarization of attitudes, material and structural opportunities are important mediators of the expression of violence.

At the individual level, researchers are examining the category of “civilian" in greater detail, to better understand the use of violence against different types of noncombatants. Such research also emphasizes the agency of civilians who are themselves actors during wartime and the ways in which they may respond to armed groups. There is evidence to suggest that local civilian institutions can sometimes mitigate violence by governments and rebel groups. Research also examines concerns such as the use of violence against humanitarian aid workers, and the targeting of women.

== Consequences of violence against civilians ==
A relatively new area of research asks how individuals, groups, communities and domestic and international audiences respond to violence against civilians. Legacies of violence can last for many years and across generations, long after the violence occurred. Evidence on the effects of wartime violence on ethnic polarization is mixed.

Research from various countries suggests that civilian responses to violence are not uniform. However, civilians do blame actors who have acted violently against their communities, and may withdraw their support, provide support to opposing forces, or vote for an opposing political party in elections. Such outcomes are more likely to occur in the area where the violence was experienced, and when the perpetrators of violence are considered outsiders.

Individuals are likely to respond to violence by rejecting the ideology of the perpetrating group, particularly if the violence was severe. Those exposed to violence are likely to engage in prosocial behavior and to increase their political engagement.

Research on the effectiveness of groups using violence against civilians in gaining political ends is mixed. Macro-level evidence suggests that rebel groups are likely to gain support from Western international actors in situations where governments are employing violence against civilians and rebel groups are showing restraint towards civilians. The United Nations is more likely to deploy peacekeepers when conflicts involve high levels of violence towards civilians. However, peacekeeping missions are more likely to be effective at protecting civilians from rebel groups than from governments.

== See also ==
- Child murder
- Civilian casualty ratio
- Collective punishment
- Dehumanization
- Genocide
- Incitement to genocide
- Indiscriminate attack
- State crime
