= 2025 UNHRC Commission of Inquiry report on Gaza genocide =

UN report affirming Israel's genocide in Gaza

Legal analysis of the conduct of Israel in Gaza pursuant to the Convention on the Prevention and Punishment of the Crime of Genocide
- Presented: 16 September 2025
- Location: Geneva, Switzerland, United Nations Human Rights Council's 60th session Also available as PDF
- Author: Independent International Commission of Inquiry on the Occupied Palestinian Territory
- Purpose: Determine whether actions committed by Israel between 7 October 2023 and 31 July 2025 in the Gaza Strip constitute failure to prevent or committing of genocide under the 1948 Genocide Convention

On 16 September 2025, the Independent International Commission of Inquiry on the Occupied Palestinian Territory released a report concluding that Israel is failing to prevent and is actively committing genocide against Palestinians. The commission that released the report was set up by the United Nations Human Rights Council (UNHRC), though it is independent and does not officially represent the UN. The Commission found Israel guilty of four out of five acts specified in Article 2 of the 1948 Genocide Convention against Palestinians (murder, causing serious bodily or mental harm, deliberately inflicting conditions of life calculated to destroy the group, and imposing measures to prevent births) and found statements by senior Israeli officials alongside other evidence sufficient to establish genocidal intent. The report called for genocide charges to be added to the ICC arrest warrants for Israeli leaders.

The report's official title is Legal analysis of the conduct of Israel in Gaza pursuant to the Convention on the Prevention and Punishment of the Crime of Genocide. The report, spanning 72 pages long, resulted from a two-year investigation, examining evidence between 7 October 2023 and 31 July 2025 limited to the Gaza Strip. The report was released in the 60th session of the Human Rights Council in Geneva, Switzerland.

== Legal grounds ==
=== Actus reus ===
Article 2 of the Genocide Convention defines genocide as:

... any of the following acts committed with intent to destroy, in whole or in part, a national, ethnical, racial or religious group, as such:

(a) Killing members of the group;
(b) Causing serious bodily or mental harm to members of the group;
(c) Deliberately inflicting on the group conditions of life calculated to bring about its physical destruction in whole or in part;
(d) Imposing measures intended to prevent births within the group;
(e) Forcibly transferring children of the group to another group.

— Convention on the Prevention and Punishment of the Crime of Genocide, Article 2

The Commission concluded Israel engaged in acts (a), (b), (c), and (d). This established actus reus of genocide.

=== Dolus specialis ===
Because actus reus is established, proof of dolus specialis (the mens rea component of the crime proving there is genocidal intent) establishes legal grounds for genocide charges, because both actus reus and dolus specialis must be established in order for there to be a genocide.

The Commission establish genocidal intent in two ways:

(i) Intent is established through "statements expressing an intent to destroy, in whole or in part, the protected group."

(ii) Intent is "the only reasonable inference that could be drawn based on the pattern of conduct of the Israeli authorities" in "the totality of the evidence."

To substantiate (i), statements cited include:

- Former Defence Minister Yoav Gallant claiming Israel was fighting "human animals" and must "act accordingly," later saying "Gaza won't return to what it was before... We will eliminate everything."
- President Isaac Herzog stating "it's an entire nation out there that is responsible. It is not true, this rhetoric about civilians who were not aware and not involved."
- Prime Minister Benjamin Netanyahu invoking (against Palestinians) Amalek, a set of biblical passages where "God tells the Israelites, 'Now go and attack Amalek, and utterly destroy all that they have; do not spare them, but kill both man and women, child and infant...'"

The Commission claimed that even if the statements made were the only pieces of evidence considered in the genocide case, these statements are alone sufficient to establish that Israel is liable under the convention because direct and public incitement to commit genocide is punishable under Article 3(c) of the Genocide Convention, even in the absence of other actions (such as genocide or complicity in genocide).

Additional cited evidence establishing genocidal intent included other statements by lower Israeli politicians, Amnesty International's report of a photograph of a slogan on an Israeli military watchtower with the words "Destroy Gaza," and the failure of Israeli officials to investigate or punish IDF soldiers who celebrated demolishing Palestinian civilian properties in Gaza.

== Timeline of cited evidence ==
The Commission categorized evidence into one of the four relevant acts under Article 2 of the Genocide Convention in order to establish actus reus:

Killings

- 7 October 2023 – 30 July 2024: WHO: 498 attacks on health facilities
- 13 October 2023: Salah al-Din Street evacuation convoy attack
- 20 October 2023: Al-Aydi family home airstrike
- 2024–2025: The Lancet: Life expectancy loss of 34.9 years on average in Gaza
- 29 January 2024: Killing of Hind Rajab
- 18 March 2025: March 2025 Israeli attacks on the Gaza Strip
- 23 March 2025: Rafah paramedic massacre
- 25 March 2025: Save the Children: deadliest week for children in Gaza
- May–July 2025: Gaza Strip aid distribution killings
- 15 July 2025: OHCHR breakdown of women and children killed in Gaza
- 31 July 2025: OCHA cumulative death toll in Gaza reaches 60,199
- August 2025: Analysis indicating ~83% dead in Gaza are civilians
- 2023–2025: Killings in Gaza safe zones and evacuation routes
- 2023–2025: Blockade-induced deaths in Gaza
- 2023–2025: Killing of health workers in the Gaza war
- 2023–2025: Killing of journalists in the Gaza war

Serious bodily or mental harm

- 8 October 2023–present: Sde Teiman detention abuses
- 16 October 2023: Ben-Gvir detainee food access restrictions order
- November 2023: UNRWA school attack causing child double amputation
- December 2023: Destruction of Al-Basma IVF clinic
- January–May 2024: WHO estimate of Gaza limb amputations
- June 2024: UNRWA warning on daily child amputations
- September 2024: UN Women mental health survey in Gaza
- October 2024: OCHA briefing on child amputees
- 1 December 2024: UNEP debris and toxic exposure assessment in Gaza
- 13 December 2024: UNOSAT damage assessment of Gaza structures
- 11 March 2025: UNHRC testimony on sexual violence trauma in Gaza
- 18–31 March 2025: Child injuries after ceasefire breakdown
- October 2023–25 June 2025: Forced displacement during evacuations in Gaza
- 20 July 2025: Partitioning of Gaza with military corridor expansion
- 30 July 2025: OCHA reported injuries in Gaza
- 2023–2025: Sexual and gender-based violence against Palestinian detainees
- 2023–2025: Public shaming and harassment of Palestinian women
- 7 October 2023 – 11 June 2025: Attacks impairing healthcare services in Gaza

Conditions of life calculated to bring about destruction of the group

- 7 October 2023: Electricity cut to Gaza ordered by Israel Katz
- 9 October 2023: Declaration of total siege on Gaza
- 7–20 October 2023: Complete halt of aid truck entries into Gaza
- 18 October 2023: Nuseirat refugee camp bakery destruction
- 25 October 2023: Attack on the only bakery in Al-Maghazi
- 30–31 October 2023: Airstrikes on Turkish-Palestinian Friendship Hospital
- 1 November 2023: Closure of Gaza's Turkish Hospital (oncology) due to siege damage
- 12 December 2023: United Nations General Assembly Resolution ES-10/22
- 21 December 2023: WFP reports 24 of 25 contracted bakeries damaged
- December 2023: OCHA describes Gaza humanitarian situation as "apocalyptic"
- December 2023: Siege of Al-Awda Hospital in North Gaza
- 26 January 2024: ICJ first provisional measures order (South Africa v. Israel)
- 27 February 2024: Al-Awda Hospital partial shutdown for lack of fuel and supplies
- 28 March 2024: ICJ second provisional measures order warning of catastrophic conditions
- January 2024: Demolition of Israa University campus in Gaza
- December 2023: Demolition of Al-Azhar University campus in Gaza
- 24 May 2024: ICJ third order: halt Rafah offensive and ensure humanitarian access
- April–May 2025: UNOSAT structural damage assessments
- 2 March–18 May 2025: Total blockade of humanitarian aid, food, fuel, electricity
- 9 March 2025: IEC halts all electricity sales to Gaza
- 10 March 2025: UN confirms zero humanitarian aid allowed into Gaza for nine days
- 13 May 2025: Strikes on Nasser Medical Complex burn unit and Gaza European Hospital
- 15 May 2025: Gaza European Hospital forced out of service
- 19 May 2025: Limited aid entry resumes (nine UN trucks) after 11-week blockade
- 27 May 2025: UNESCO verifies damage to 110 cultural and religious sites
- 25 July 2025: UNRWA barred from bringing humanitarian supplies
- 29 July 2025: IPC alert: famine thresholds passed and starvation widespread
- 22 August 2025: IPC Famine Review Committee: Famine occurring in Gaza Governorate
- 30 January 2025: Israeli laws restricting UNRWA operations take effect
- 2023–2025: Systematic destruction of education system and school attacks

Preventing births

- 7 October 2023 – 2025: Attacks on Al-Shifa and Nasser maternity wards rendering services inoperative
- 2023–2025: Targeting/forced closure of reproductive health centres
- January 2024: Closure of Al-Aqsa Hospital maternity ward
- December 2023: Destruction of Al-Basma IVF clinic
- July 2025: Constrained resumption of maternity services (13 hospitals + 4 field hospitals)

== Recommendations ==
The Commission made a number of suggestions to ameliorate the genocide:

Recommendations to the Government of Israel

- End the commission of genocide and cooperate with the ICJ provisional measures against Israel
- Implement a permanent ceasefire in Gaza and end all military operations that involve genocidal acts
- Restore humanitarian aid access
- Ensure medical evacuations of Gazans to other countries
- Allow the UNHRC access to Israel to continue investigations
- Investigate and punish commission of and incitement to genocide

Recommendations to UN Member States

- Employ all means available to prevent genocide
- Cease transfer of arms and other equipment or items which might be used militarily
- Prosecute individuals and corporations who aid genocide
- Cooperate with ICC arrest warrants for Israeli leaders

Recommendations to the International Criminal Court

- That the ICC amend its arrest warrants for Israeli leaders to include the crime of genocide
- That the ICC examine adding Israeli officials mentioned in the report not already in the arrest warrant to the warrant

== Reactions by countries ==
=== Brazil ===
In a press release, Brazil referenced the report, saying "human rights violations in Gaza... must be investigated," but did not explicitly affirm support for the Commission's genocide allegation. However, Brazil voiced support for some of the report's recommendations such as a permanent ceasefire and unimpeded humanitarian aid access.

=== Israel ===
Israel did not cooperate with the commission having accused it of pursuing an anti-Israel political agenda and exceeding its mandate. Israel rejected allegations of genocide as antisemitic "blood libel". The Israeli ambassador to the UN described the report as a "libelous rant", and President Isaac Herzog said that it "obsesses over blaming the Jewish state, whitewashing Hamas’s atrocities, and turning victims of one of the worst massacres of modern times into the accused". The Israeli foreign ministry called for the abolition of the Commission of Inquiry and accused the reports of authors of being "Hamas proxies". Commission chair Navi Pillay said of the Israeli response: "I wish they would tell us where we went wrong on these facts, or just cooperate with us."

=== Norway ===
On 16 September 2025, Norwegian Minister of Foreign Affairs Espen Barth Eide released a statement stating "we take the findings of the report very seriously," pledging to investigate its findings and recommendations and "follow up on them in our further policy development."

=== Palestine ===
The Palestinian Ministry of Foreign Affairs (controlled by the Palestinian Authority) released an official statement calling on the international community to act to prevent genocide "without delay" and on states to take "practical and decisive measures to stop the ongoing genocide, provide international protection for the Palestinian people, end all forms of military and political support to Israel... and impose sanctions on it." The ministry suggested "international silence" on the issue "places the international community in a position of complicity."

=== South Africa ===
South Africa urged all states to comply with the report's recommendations. President Cyril Ramaphosa referenced the report's finding of genocide in the general debate of the eightieth session of the United Nations General Assembly.

=== United Kingdom ===
A UK government spokesman said that the determination as to whether Israel's actions constitute genocide was up to a court, though it stated that "Israel's actions are appalling".

== Sources ==
- Asi, Yara M. (19 August 2025). "The Growing Consensus over Israel's Genocide in Gaza". Arab Center Washington DC.
- Shaw, Martin (19 September 2025). "The Genocide that Changed the World". Journal of Genocide Research (Roundtable: Gaza and Genocide Studies): 1–15. doi:10.1080/14623528.2025.2556575. hdl:10230/71505.
- Sultany, Nimer (9 May 2024). "A Threshold Crossed: On Genocidal Intent and the Duty to Prevent Genocide in Palestine". Journal of Genocide Research (Forum: Gaza: International Humanitarian Law and Genocide): 1–26. doi:10.1080/14623528.2024.2351261.
- Tharoor, Ishaan (30 July 2025). "Leading genocide scholars see a genocide happening in Gaza". The Washington Post.
- van den Berg, Stephanie (1 September 2025). "Israel is committing genocide in Gaza, scholars' association says". Reuters.
