= Yehuda Vach =

Israeli military officer

- יהודה ואך
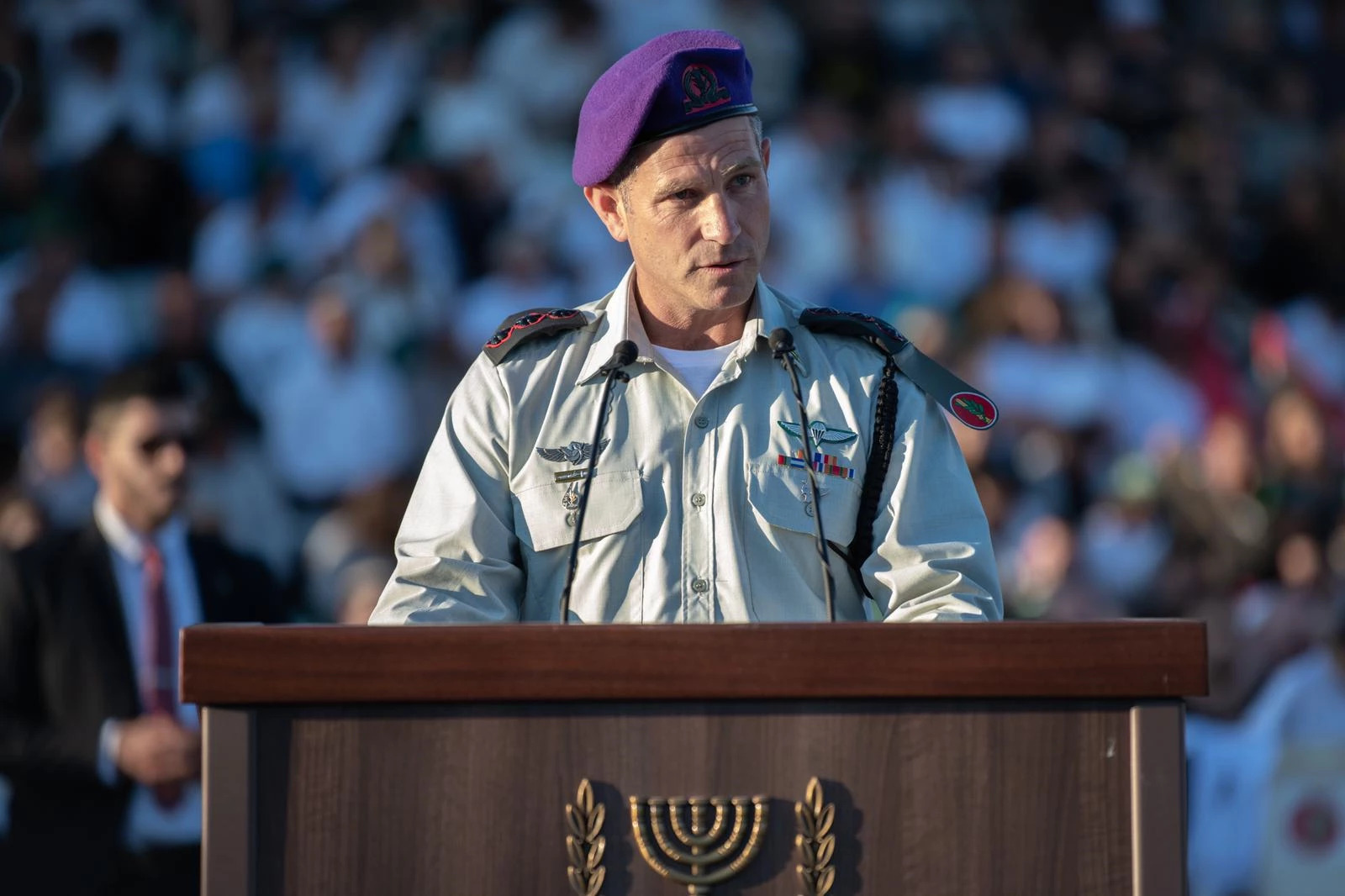
- Vach in November 2022
- Born: 1979 (age 46–47); Kiryat Arba, West Bank
- Military career
- Allegiance: Israel
- Branch: Israel Defense Forces
- Conflicts: 2006 Lebanon War; Gaza war

Yehuda Vach (Hebrew: יהודה ואך, born 1979), is an Israeli military officer who has served in the Lebanon and Gaza wars.

== Early life and education ==
Yehuda Vach was born in 1979 in Kiryat Arba, an illegal Israeli settlement in the West Bank.

He attended the Bnei David mechina in Eli, another Illegal West Bank settlement. The school provides religious as well as paramilitary training in preparation for military service in the IDF.

== Military service ==
| Date | Rank | Role |
|---|---|---|
| 1998 onwards | Officer | Active Officer |
| 2006 | Officer | Participant in the Lebanon War |
| 2019 | | Commander Brigade 769 |
| 2021 | Colonel | Commander Heiram Brigade, Northern Command. |
| Aug 2021- June 2023 | Colonel | Commander of Bahad 1, IDF officers' school |
| July 2024 - Dec 2024 | Brigadier General | Gaza war, Commander of Netzarim Corridor (252nd Div) |
| August 2024 - Present | Brigadier General | Gaza war, Commander of 252nd "Sinai" Division |

== Misconduct ==
=== Endangerment of troops ===
During the period of 17-28 August 2024, Vach ordered his soldiers to enter Zeitoun, a neighborhood of Gaza City, leading to the deaths of 8 soldiers. Vach was accused of "flawed, even negligent, preparation". A commander who fought in the Netzarim corridor under Vach said that "it was done without suitable tools, without engineering units, without other necessary troops". A number of officers and soldiers said that "Vach acted rashly on more than one occasion".

=== Loss of weapons ===
Vach has been reprimanded twice for the theft of weapons where he was in command. In 2017, he was deputy commander of the Givati Brigade, and was reprimanded after weapons were stolen from the armory of the prison Sde Teiman. In 2020, he was again reprimanded after weapons were stolen from Gibor army base.

== War crimes ==
=== Targeting of civilians and indiscriminate fire ===
During the Gaza war, Vach issued direct orders to fire at civilians gathered near UN aid trucks, even when no threat was present. Soldiers under his command stated this policy was widely followed, with one officer noting the intent was to make people clear out, even if they were only there for food. An officer in Vach’s 252nd division reportedly told Haaretz reported that the killing of Palestinians turned "into a competition between units".

The Hind Rajab Foundation has filed a case in the ICC, accusing Vach's troops of "gunning down" 15-year-old Yahya Akram Al-Hilu and 16-year-old Muhammad Amer Salouha when they were searching for food. The foundation also compared Vach to SS-Oberführer and leader of the Dirlewanger Brigade, Oskar Dirlewanger due to his actions in Gaza.

Haaretz reported on the killing of an unarmed 16-year-old boy by Vach's soldiers. They were told that "the boy wasn't a Hamas operative – but just a civilian" but the battalion commander "congratulated us for killing a terrorist, saying he hoped we'd kill ten more tomorrow". At one point Division 252 announced the killing of 200 militants. An officer there disputed this, saying that only 10 of those were known Hamas personnel.

=== Massacres of civilians ===
Vach was the commander of the Golani Brigade unit responsible for the Rafah paramedic massacre on 23 March 2025 when a humanitarian convoy was attacked, the medics killed and buried with their crushed vehicles. The forensics report found that the aid workers were killed at close-range. The dead medics were found with "specific and intentional" bullet wounds in heads and hearts. Some of the bodies were found with their hands or feet bound. The IDF said that they had fired on vehicles "advancing suspiciously" without headlights or emergency signals. It said a Hamas operative and "eight other terrorists" were among those killed. A video taken by one of the killed medics forced the IDF to change its account of the incident. Hamas official Basem Naim called the massacre "a flagrant violation of the Geneva Conventions and a war crime." An technical investigation by Forensic Architecture confirms that there was no return fire and there was no threat to the IDF soldiers.

=== Destruction of civilian infrastructure ===
In March 2025, soldiers under Vach's command demolished, through a controlled explosion, the Turkish-Palestinian Friendship Hospital in central Gaza. At the time the IDF falsely claimed that it was "an airstrike against Hamas operatives who were residing at the hospital", though they also confirmed that the hospital had not been used as a hospital for over a year at the time of destruction. News media reported that the hospital had been used as a barracks by the IDF for some time.

Vach is accused of removing the hospital's designation as a sensitive site and ordering its demolition without approval from superiors. The Palestinian Ministry of Foreign Affairs and Euro-Med Monitor condemned the destruction of the hospital as a war crime.

== Operational doctrine ==
=== Against defensive self-fortification ===
Vach published an article in the October 2019 issue of the Dado Center Journal titled "From iron wires to a fortified wall: the fence syndrome and its impact on the IDF", which has criticized the doctrine of defensive self-fortification saying that walls seem to project strength but actually project fear. Vach promoted the "territorial imperative", a doctrine that that security can only be achieved through the physical control of land and the total destruction of the enemy's infrastructure, rather than the management of a border through defensive fortifications and technology.

=== Territorial conquest ===
In Gaza, Vach has emphasized territorial conquest as the primary objective of military operations. Vach stated that "in the Middle East, victory comes through conquering territory. We must keep conquering until we win." and also wanted the seizure of Palestinian land to serve as a form of punishment for the October 7, 2023 attack. An integral part of this conquest was the destruction of all buildings in areas under his command. Engineering units were tasked to "flatten every building" in specific areas.

=== No innocents ===
Soon after taking command of 252 Division in July 2024, he reportedly instructed his officers that "there are no innocents in Gaza", echoing President Isaac Herzog's assertion that the "entire nation" of Palestinians was responsible for October 7 and that there were no civilians in Gaza "not involved". This became operational doctrine under Vach, meaning "everyone's a terrorist", which effectively allowed his soldiers permission to kill any Palestinian at will.

== Personal life ==
Vach is the son of Shalom and Liat Vach and has ten brothers. He is married to Osnat, and they have six children. They live in Meirav, a religious kibbutz in northern Israel. His brother, Golan Vach, also serves as a Colonel in the IDF reserves, and was involved in the beheaded babies hoax. Golan was later injured by a tunnel collapse in the Netzarim Corridor while he headed "a small dubious unit", under his brother Yehuda's command, destroying civilian buildings in Gaza. Vach is also a musician.

Their younger brother Elishev Wach, a captain in the IDF reserves, led protests outside Defense Minister Yoav Gallant's house to promote greater intensity and "total war", after Golan was trapped in the tunnel collapse.
