= Environmental impact of the Gaza war =

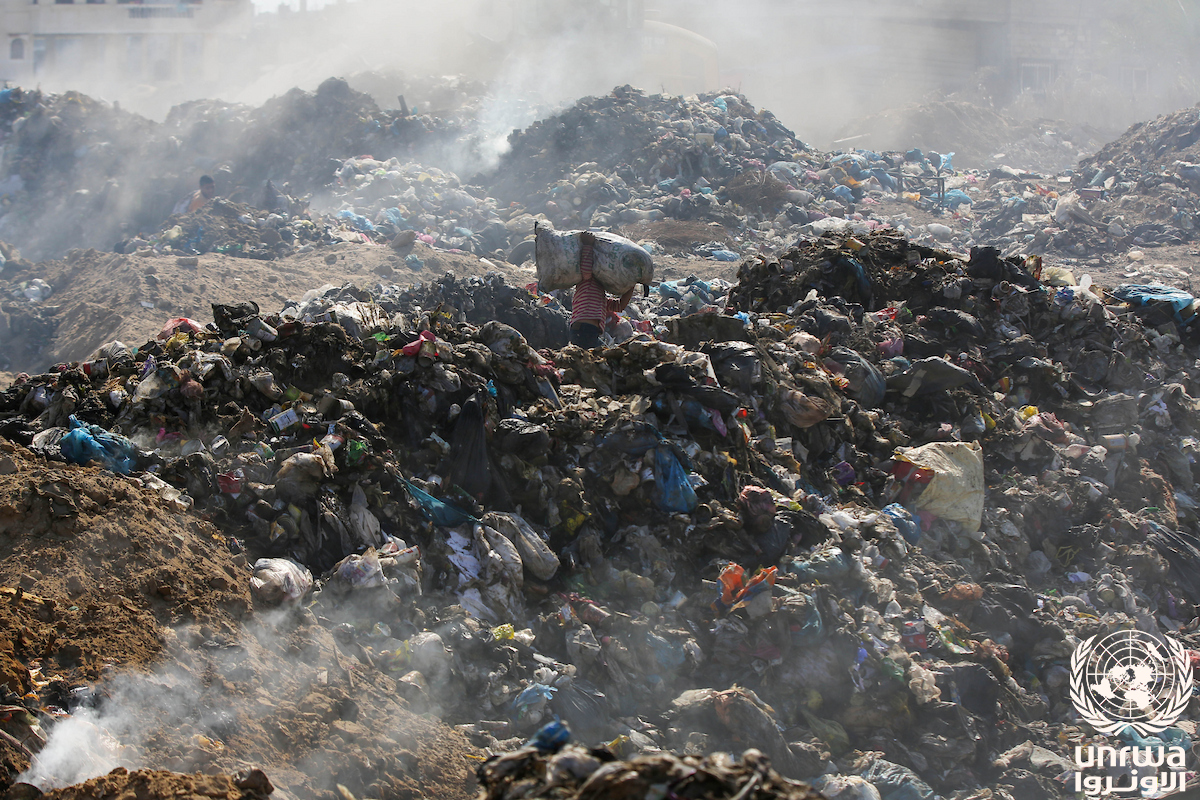
Accumulated waste in Gaza

There has been extensive environmental damage caused by the ongoing Israeli invasion of the Gaza Strip (itself a part of the Gaza war), including the destruction of agricultural land, displacement of people, bombing of Gaza, the Israeli blockade, and famine in the Gaza Strip. By March 2024, nearly half of the farmland in Gaza had been destroyed, and by the following January 80% of the tree cover had been destroyed.

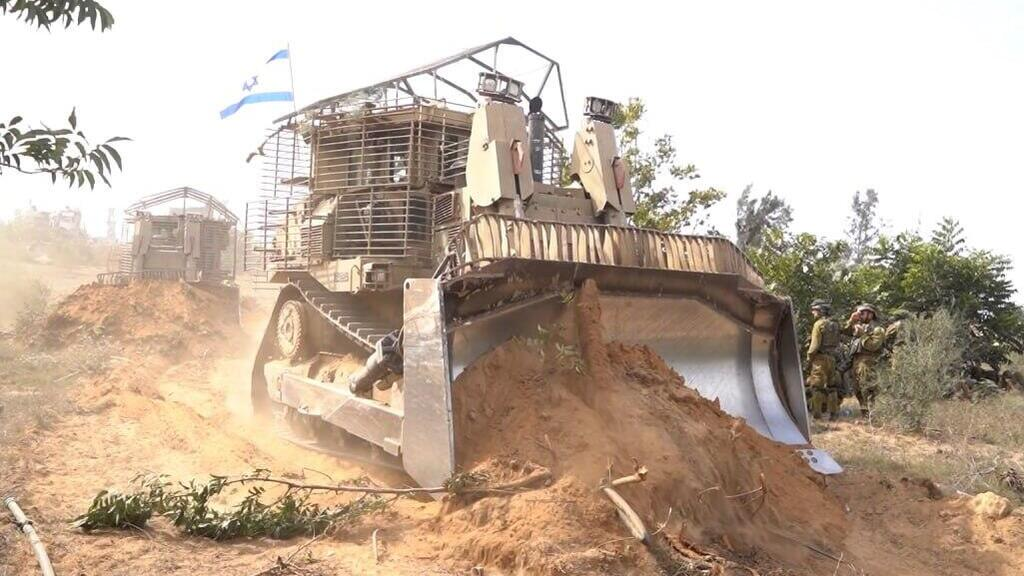
IDF bulldozer clearing trees in Gaza in October 2023

Israeli bombardment and the blockade have led to a total collapse of Gaza's civil infrastructure, including sewage treatment, waste disposal, water management, and fuel supplies. Water has been polluted by 130,000 cubic metres of sewage being discharged into the sea every day due to Israel cutting off fuel supplies. Groundwater has been contaminated by toxins and munitions and air has been polluted by smoke and particulates from bombing. Soils have been degraded by uprooting trees and contaminated by toxins, munitions, heavy bombing and demolitions. Bombing by the Israeli army has created 50 million tonnes of debris and hazardous material, much of which contains human remains and tens of thousands of bombs. In June 2024, northern Gaza was described as a "wasteland", unable to sustain life.

The size and lasting impact of the systematic and intentional destruction of agriculture in Gaza have led to calls by the research group Forensic Architecture at Goldsmiths, University of London, and the Palestinian Environmental NGOs Network for the Israeli Government to be investigated for the Rome Statute war crime of ecocide for "widespread, long-term and severe damage to the natural environment".

== Destruction ==
=== Overview ===
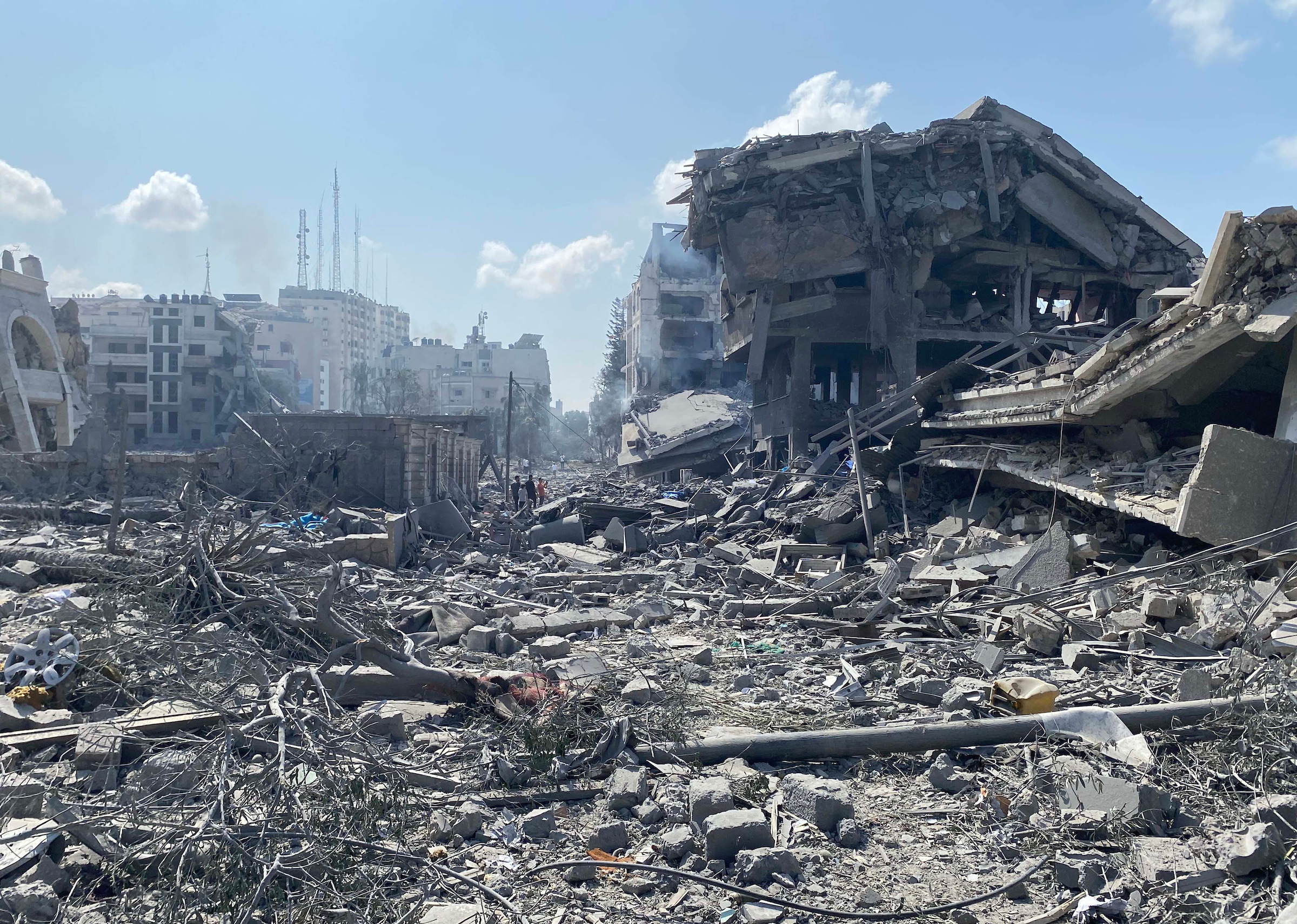
Palestinians in the rubble of the El-Remal area in Gaza City after an Israeli airstrike on October 9, 2023

By January 2024, between 36% and 45% of Gaza's buildings — including homes, schools, mosques, hospitals, and shops — have been destroyed or damaged. As the war continued the extent of the damage increased, and by December 2024 around 170,000 buildings in Gaza (69%) had been damaged or destroyed.

After 33 weeks of conflict, more than 70,000 homes in Gaza had been destroyed, leaving 1.7 million displaced people crammed into overcrowded, unsanitary areas. By June 2024, Israeli forces had also destroyed water wells in northern Gaza, reportedly exacerbating near-famine conditions.

By the end of May, more than 140 landfills were scattered across the 41 km-long Gaza Strip. The heaps have grown so large that their vast, chaotic shapes can be seen on satellite images from hundreds of kilometres above the earth. "Everywhere you look, there is a pile of trash," said UNRWA spokeswoman Louise Wateridge.

Palestinian Environmental NGOs Network stated "The Israeli occupation has completely damaged all elements of life and all environmental elements in Gaza – they completely destroyed the agriculture and wildlife". Reuters has described the damage done to Gaza by Israeli as turning it into a 'wasteland'. The head of the UN Mine Action Programme noted that recycling infrastructure will be crucial to reconstruction. Despite the massive clean-up required, UNMAS has only $5 million in funding.

=== Destruction of farmland, orchards and forests ===
Before 7 October 2023, around 170 km^{2} (66 sq mi) of the Gaza strip was farms and orchards, 47% of Gaza's total land area. By the end of February 2024 satellite data showed that the Israeli military had destroyed more than 65 km^{2} of farms and orchards (38% of the total). Tractors, tanks and vehicles were used by Israeli forces to uproot the orchards and fields of crops. In total 2,000 agricultural sites, including farms and greenhouses had destroyed and have often been replaced with Israeli military earthworks. Of the 7,500 greenhouses around a third have been entirely destroyed, 90% have been destroyed by Israeli troops in the north of Gaza and around 40% in Khan Younis. Between 7 October and 21 March 48% of Gaza's tree cover has been lost or damaged by the Israeli military and by people trapped in Gaza cutting wood for cooking and heating due to the fuel blockade. By January 2025, this had increased to 80%. Soils have been degraded by uprooting trees and contaminated by toxins, munitions, heavy bombing and demolitions.

Research by Forensic Architecture (the research group at Goldsmiths, University of London) found that crops on Palestinian farms bordering Gaza's perimeter had been sprayed by airborne herbicides and had been regularly cleared by Israeli forces bulldozers. Farmers have been fired at by Israel Defense Forces snipers. Israel has indicated it wants to create a permanent 'buffer zone' around Gaza, where much of the agricultural land was located. Research by Forensic Architecture found that "along that engineered 'border,' sophisticated systems of fences and surveillance reinforce a military buffer zone". The IDF has claimed that it "does not intentionally harm agricultural land". In April 2024, the mayor of Beit Lahia stated Israel had destroyed 70 percent of northern Gaza's water wells, as well as "all agricultural crops in the town which is considered the primary food basket for the Strip".

In June 2024, UNOSAT, the United Nations' satellite imagery agency, stated 57 percent of Gaza's permanent crop fields showed significant declines in density and health. According to the Food and Agriculture Organization, the damage to Gaza's agricultural lands has impacted its food sovereignty. This damage grew to 67.6 percent of croplands by October 2024. By late July 2025, 86 percent of the agricultural land in the Gaza Strip was damaged, and much of the remainder was inaccessible to Palestinians: 1.5 percent of the agricultural land was both accessible and undamaged.

== Pollution ==
=== Hazardous materials ===
Between 7 October 2023 and April 2024, the Israeli military has dropped tens of thousands of bombs on Gaza, with 50% to 62% of all buildings damaged or destroyed by January 2024. The UN Environment Programme (UNEP) estimates that the bombing by Israel had created 37 million tonnes of debris and hazardous material by April 2024, much of which contains human remains and bombs. In December 2024, the UNEP updated its estimate to 50 million tonnes of debris.

Human Rights Watch has confirmed that Israeli forces used white phosphorus in Gaza on 11 October 2023. The use of white phosphorus in Gaza is expected to have a long-term impact on the environment, especially affecting agricultural land. White phosphorus is harmful to human health, and when used contaminates soil, water, and the air. According to a policy analyst at Al-Shabaka, military debris will remain in the soil, land, sea, and in the bodies of Palestinians living in Gaza. The full scope of the environmental damage caused by weapons dropped on Gaza may never be known due to a lack of actions and political will.

UNEP estimated that by March 2024, the total amount of debris had reached 22.9 million tonnes. By the end of April, this had risen to 37 million tonnes, an average of 300 kg of rubble per square metre, according to Pehr Lodhammar, the former head of the UN Mine Action Service in Iraq. Clearing is estimated to take 14 years. The rubble itself poses a physical barrier and risk of injury, and it may contain harmful substances like asbestos, heavy metals, fire contaminants, unexploded ordnance, and hazardous chemicals. Solid waste is being dumped in informal sites, where hazardous substances can leach into the porous soil and potentially contaminate the aquifer. In June 2024, the United Nations estimated more than 330,000 tons of solid waste had accumulated in populated areas of the Gaza Strip. The air in Gaza has been polluted by smoke and particulates from bombing.

=== Sewage treatment ===
The siege has resulted in the total collapse of Gaza's civil infrastructure; sewage treatment, waste disposal, water management, fuel supplies have all broken down. EcoPeace Middle East estimates that 44% of Gaza's gas, water, and sanitation facilities were damaged in the first three months of the war. The damage to water and sanitation infrastructure increases the risk of flooding during winter rains. According to the Norwegian Refugee Council, the shutdown of sewage treatment plants in October 2023, following Israel's fuel blockade, resulted in more than 130,000 cubic meters of untreated sewage being discharged daily into the Mediterranean Sea, posing a significant environmental threat. Groundwater also has been contaminated by toxins and munitions. The U.N. Environment Programme stated the war had reversed Gaza's improvements with its water desalination and wastewater treatment facilities. There were eight wastewater treatment plants in the Gaza Strip; by May 2024 six had been damaged or destroyed. The degradation of sanitation infrastructure has health implications for Gaza's populace, and has led to an increase in diarrhoeal disease. An assessment in February 2025, by which time a ceasefire was in effect, found that 73 out of the 84 sewage pumping stations in Gaza had been destroyed.

=== Greenhouse gases ===
Wars have a direct impact on climate change by increasing carbon emissions and destroying infrastructure. In October 2023 alone, the Israeli army dropped around 25,000 tons of munitions on the Gaza Strip, roughly 1.5 times the explosive force of the bomb dropped on Hiroshima during World War II. The climate cost of the first 60 days of Israel's military response was equivalent to burning at least 150,000 tonnes of coal. The emissions from the first two months of the Gaza war exceeded the annual carbon footprint of over 20 climate-vulnerable nations. Over 99% of the 281,000 metric tonnes of CO_{2} equivalent generated in the two months following the October 7 Hamas attack was due to Israel's aerial bombardment and ground invasion, according to UK and US researchers.

Estimates do not account for war infrastructure built by both Israel and Hamas, including Hamas' tunnel network and Israel's Iron Wall. With these included, total emissions increase to 450,000 metric tonnes of CO_{2} equivalent, more than the annual emissions of over 33 countries and territories. The figure could be higher as defence forces are not bound to report their carbon emissions as it may undermine national security.

Researchers from Lancaster University, Queen Mary University of London, and the Climate and Community Project also highlighted the role of allies in Gaza's environmental destruction. By December 4, 2023, 200 American cargo flights delivered 10,000 tonnes of military equipment to Israel, consuming 50,000,000 litres (11,000,000 imp gal; 13,000,000 US gal) of aviation fuel and emitting 133,000 tonnes of CO_{2}—more than Grenada's annual emissions.

An April 2025 study published in the Social Science Research Network estimated the war would have a long term cost of 31 million metric tonnes of carbon dioxide equivalent.

=== Reaction ===
UNEP has found that heavy bombardment of populated areas like the Gaza strip contaminates soils and groundwater for the long term. This is caused through the munitions themselves and when damaged and destroyed buildings release hazardous materials including asbestos, fuel and industrial chemicals into the air, soil and groundwater. UNEP state:

This is an extremely large amount of debris, especially for such a small area... components of the debris and rubble can contain harmful substances like asbestos, heavy metals, fire contaminants, unexploded ordnance, and hazardous chemicals.

This statement was echoed by the UN special rapporteur on human rights and the environment, David Boyd who said that Israeli military operations had disastrous consequences for the environment and climate in Gaza due to wide spread pollution, loss of biodiversity, wide spread contaminations and continuation of the climate crisis. The UNHCR Special Rapporteur on adequate housing, Balakrishnan Rajagopal and other experts have described the destruction as domicide. After a trip to Gaza City in mid-2024, Arwa Damon, the founder of INARA, a humanitarian aid organization, stated Gaza was "totally and completely uninhabitable".

== Impact on human health ==
=== Famine ===
Gaza Strip famine
- Country: Palestine
- Location: Gaza Strip
- Total deaths: 37+ (Note: as of 1 June 2024.) (Note: According to CNN, the true number of people dead from starvation may already be higher, as "limited access to northern Gaza has hindered the ability of aid agencies to fully assess the situation there.")
- Causes: Israeli blockade and limitation of aid; Destruction of food and water infrastructure; Complications in deliveries due to war and looting
- Relief: Humanitarian aid
- Consequences: 96% of population facing food insecurity; 495,000 facing near-famine hunger

Due to a combination of destruction of agricultural land, displacement of people, bombing and the Israeli blockade, the Gaza Strip is facing risk of imminent famine. Most of the population in Gaza are at imminent risk of starvation. The levels are unevenly distributed across the region, with the north hardest hit by ongoing military action and a chaotic security situation. In May, the head of the World Food Programme described the area as experiencing a "full-blown famine" that was moving southwards. The IPC report in March 2024 said that around 210,000 people in the north were facing catastrophic levels of hunger.

A senior WFP spokesman claimed that, overall in the region, 20% of households were experiencing extreme food shortages, essentially starvation, in May 2024 Half of Gaza's population is expected to face catastrophic hunger by mid-July, with all 2.2 million people unable to meet their food needs. The WHO Director General has described the situation as "beyond catastrophic".

Humanitarian efforts were hampered by military action and access denials. Convoys often required police escorts due to attacks by armed groups and hungry crowds. Some UN food convoys were hit by Israeli army fire. On 21 May, UNRWA announced the suspension of food distributions in Rafah due to the lack of supplies and increasing insecurity. Israel has been accused of obstructing aid to northern Gaza.

=== Long-term impact ===
The EU's foreign policy chief Josep Borrell and Human Rights Watch activists claimed that Israel was "provoking famine" as a weapon of war. Israeli officials have rejected these accusations. The research group Forensic Architecture at Goldsmiths, University of London have described the destruction as systematic and for the Gaza's agriculture, stating "What's left is devastation... an area that is no longer livable". They said:

The targeted farms and greenhouses are fundamental to local food production for a population already under a decades-long siege.... the effects of this systematic agricultural destruction are exacerbated by other deliberate acts of deprivation of critical resources for Palestinian survival in Gaza.

Experts warn that the situation in northern Gaza will have lasting consequences, particularly for newborn babies and pregnant women, even if there is a lull in the fighting. The Dutch peace organisation PAX has stated: "War generally collapses everything. In Gaza, it's making people exposed to additional risks from pollution, from polluted groundwater. It's the destruction of anything the civilian population depends on."

== Ecocide ==
The size and lasting impact of the destruction in Gaza have led to calls for the Israeli Government to be investigated for the war crime for ecocide under the Rome Statute for "widespread, long-term and severe damage to the natural environment". Saeed Bagheri, a lecturer in international law at the University of Reading, stated that there were sufficient grounds to investigate the damage caused to Gaza's environment, while the Palestinian Environmental NGOs Network has stated "What is happening is, for sure, ecocide... [It] is completely damaging the environment in Gaza for the long term, not only for the short term".

The research project "No Traces of Life, Ecocide in Gaza 2023 – 2024" by research group Forensic Architecture at Goldsmiths, University of London, found that "The destruction of agricultural land and infrastructure in Gaza is a deliberate act of ecocide... the targeted farms and greenhouses are fundamental to local food production for a population already under a decades-long siege. The effects of this systematic agricultural destruction are exacerbated by other deliberate acts of deprivation of critical resources for Palestinian survival in Gaza".

According to the Rome Statute of the International Criminal Court, it is a war crime to launch an attack knowing that it will cause extensive, lasting and serious damage to the environment.
