= Vukovar children massacre report =

Atrocity propaganda case during the Yugoslav Wars

The Vukovar children massacre or Vukovar baby massacre refers to a well known case of propaganda during the Yugoslav Wars. Extensive Serbian media coverage of the unconfirmed and false story continued their practice at the time of misrepresenting the Croatian people as inherently criminal and genocidal.

Two days after the Battle of Vukovar had ended, on 20 November 1991, Reuters reported that 41 Serb babies had been murdered in the city during the battle. The report quoted Goran Mikić, freelance photographer in the area who supplied pictures for Reuters, told Reuters and the Radio Television of Serbia (RTS) that he had seen and counted bodies of 41 children between the ages of five and seven slaughtered in a school in Borovo Naselje, and added he was told by Yugoslav Army soldiers that the children were Serbs killed by Croatian soldiers. Although Reuters retracted the report a day later, based on his admission that he neither saw nor counted the bodies, the news made headlines in Serbia, where it was used to promote the importance of the "defense of Serb hearths" in Croatia.

The Yugoslav People's Army (JNA) issued a rebuttal of the story and the RTS was also forced to make an apology, claiming their purported witness was "hallucinating". In spite of this, the Belgrade-based daily Politika still carried the story on the front page of its 22 November issue, only to publish a small retraction of the piece in the back of the 23 November issue.

This misinformation led to supposed retaliations, including the Ovčara massacre which took place 20–21 November 1991, in which Serb forces executed 264 Croatian prisoners of war and civilians. Dr. Vesna Bosanac, the head of the Vukovar hospital from which the victims were taken, said in her testimony at the February 1998 ICTY trials of Slavko Dokmanović and Slobodan Milošević that she believed the story of slaughtered babies was released on purpose to incite Serb nationalists, encouraging them to retaliate by executing Croats.

== See also ==
- Accusation in a mirror
- Atrocity propaganda
- Hamas baby beheading hoax
