= Rafah paramedic massacre =

2025 Israeli mass killing of Palestinians

- Part of the March 2025 Israeli attacks on the Gaza Strip during the Gaza war
- A frame from the video published by the NYT, showing the marked ambulances and personnel
- Location: 31°17′48.5″N 34°14′36.6″E; Rafah, Gaza Strip, Palestine
- Date: 23 March 2025
- Target: Aid workers (Palestine Red Crescent Society, Gaza Civil Defence, UNRWA)
- Attack type: Extrajudicial killings, summary execution, execution by shooting, massacre, war crime, mass burial, torture, cover-up
- Deaths: 15 Palestinian aid workers
- Injuries: 2 captured and tortured
- Perpetrator: Israel Defense Forces

On 23 March 2025, the Israel Defense Forces (IDF) attacked several humanitarian vehicles, including five ambulances, a fire truck, and a United Nations vehicle, in Al-Hashashin area in southern Rafah, Gaza Strip. The massacre resulted in the deaths of 15 aid workers, including eight members of the Palestine Red Crescent Society, five civil defense, and one UN agency employee. It was not until 30 March that most of the missing bodies were retrieved from a mass grave in Rafah, although one ambulance officer who was initially declared missing was kept under Israeli custody.

Initially the IDF spokesperson Nadav Shoshani stated that the IDF had targeted the convoy when "several uncoordinated vehicles were identified advancing suspiciously toward IDF troops without headlights or emergency signals". However, video footage uncovered from the phone of one of the victims contradicted the IDF's statements. Two survivors were detained and stated they were assaulted by the IDF. The International Federation of Red Cross and Red Crescent Societies (IFRC) condemned the attacks, stating that they were the "single most deadly" for its workers in almost a decade. All the murdered medical and civil defence workers were found wearing identifying uniforms or volunteer vests of their respective organisations.

== Background ==
On 18 March 2025, Israel launched a surprise attack on the Gaza Strip, effectively ending the January 2025 Gaza war ceasefire and resuming the Gaza war. Israel's missile and artillery attack killed more than 400 Palestinians, including 263 women and children, making it one of the deadliest in the Gaza war.

== Attacks ==
On 23 March 2025, the IDF fired on five ambulances and a fire truck "one by one." The humanitarian vehicles were "crushed and dumped, covered in sand" in an apparent attempt to cover up the killings, while the aid workers, wearing uniforms, were left missing in a mass grave for eight days. The ambulances were initially dispatched to the Al-Hashashin area in response to casualties caused by Israeli attacks on the area, before being surrounded by Israeli troops and losing contact with dispatchers. The paramedics that went to search for them were killed and wounded.

According to forensic analyst Ahmad Dhaher who examined five of the bodies, the aid workers were killed at close-range in execution-style killings, with "specific and intentional" bullet wounds in heads and hearts. Relatives of the victims described various signs of abuse. One relative noted marks on a victim's wrists from restraint and broken fingers, while another mentioned multiple gunshot wounds to the chest and wrist. Two witnesses also reported that some victims had their hands or feet bound.

A video recording discovered on a cellphone of one of the medics contradicts Israel's narrative of the incident, showing the ambulances and fire truck clearly marked with their emergency lights on as Israeli troops hit them with a barrage of gunfire, killing all the medics. In the video, paramedic Rifatt Radwan recited the Shahada, and added, "Forgive me, Mom, forgive me. I swear I only chose this path to help others." The paramedic was later found in the mass grave with a bullet in his head. The New York Times analyzed satellite imagery that showed Israeli forces bulldozing the site after the attack. Following the release of the video recording, Israel changed its account of the incident, admitting that its soldiers have "made mistakes."

The massacre was carried out by soldiers from the Golani Brigade. At the moment of the killings, they were acting under the command of Brig Gen Yehuda Vach, who has a history of establishing "kill zones" in Gaza where civilians are killed and of telling his subordinates that "there are no innocents in Gaza." Also present at the site were field operatives from Unit 504, a military intelligence unit with a reputation for cruelty and acts of torture.

=== Survivors' accounts ===
Two Palestinian first responders survived the attack on the emergency vehicle convoy.

==== Munther Abed ====
Munther Abed, a 27-year-old volunteer with the Red Crescent since he was 18, was in the first ambulance to arrive at the scene of an airstrike in Rafah's Hashashin district when it came under Israeli gunfire. Abed survived by throwing himself to the floor, while his two colleagues in the front were killed.

After being captured by Israeli soldiers, Abed described his treatment: "I was completely stripped, left only in my underwear, and my hands were bound behind my back," he recalled. "They threw me to the ground, and the interrogation began. I endured severe torture, including beatings, insults, threats of death, and suffocation when one soldier pressed a rifle against my neck. Another soldier held a dagger to my left shoulder." During his detention, he witnessed other rescue vehicles, including ambulances and fire trucks, being ambushed by Israeli forces. He also saw a bulldozer and excavator arrive to dig a pit where the vehicles and bodies were buried. Abed stated that a Red Crescent ambulance officer, Assad al-Nassara, who remains missing, was alive in Israeli detention near the scene of the killings.

Abed stated that the ambulance was marked with lights on and the Red Crescent logo visible as they headed to the site. While the IDF described the area as a war zone, Abed asserted that Hashashin was a civilian area where daily life was ongoing, not a designated combat zone. He also rejected Israel's claim that Hamas had used ambulances, calling it "utterly untrue" and reaffirming that all the crews involved were civilians.

Abed was forced to help Israeli soldiers in the vetting and photographing of local residents, who were ordered to leave the area and move to al-Mawasi. He was released in the evening and given back his watch and underwear but not his identity card, paramedic uniform, or shoes. Abed was instructed to walk toward al-Mawasi and was eventually able to flag down a passing Red Crescent vehicle for assistance.

==== Assad Al-Nassasrah ====
Assad Al-Nassasrah, a Red Crescent paramedic, was the driver of one of two ambulances. A passenger in Al-Nassasrah' ambulance recorded the video of the Israeli attack that was later recovered. The convoy sustained heavy Israeli gunfire (which was partially captured on the video) upon arriving at the location. Al-Nassasrah survived the fusillade by taking cover on the ground to the rear of his vehicle, beneath the corpse of his slain colleague who embraced him as he was dying.

After the Israeli soldiers ceased fire, they approached the convoy. Al-Nassasrah heard injured colleagues calling out for help before the Israeli troops began shooting the survivors at close range.

When the soldiers belatedly noticed Al-Nassasrah to be alive, one of them aimed a rifle at his head, whereupon Al-Nassasrah exclaimed "Don't shoot. I am Israeli." in Hebrew, saying that his mother is a Palestinian citizen of Israel. Al-Nassasrah was then stripped, blindfolded and thrown into a ditch, believing he was about to be killed. Abed, the other survivor, saw the soldiers detaining Al-Nassasrah.

=== Witness Account ===
Nir was a drone operator with the IDF and witnessed the massacre as it happened on his screen. He watched ambulances driving along, and then saw the Golani Brigade troops ambush them.

He recounts that "These were clearly identifiable as emergency vehicles, even when ground fire opened on them. Without any apparent reason, the ground troops stormed the convoy. They shot at the first vehicle, the medical staff exited, hid behind the ambulances and pleaded for their lives, and the soldiers shot them, one after another."

== Aftermath ==
From 23 March to 30 March, a "complex, week-long rescue operation" took place involving bulldozers and heavy machinery to search for the buried bodies left under the sand and debris, while emergency responders used shovels to dig through the dirt. The rescue operation was complicated by the IDF's refusal to cooperate with the Red Crescent, OCHA, and the UN, denying them entry. On 27 March, the body of a civil defense worker was recovered, and fourteen more were recovered on 30 March.

According to the UN, the killed Palestinian medics were buried by Israeli troops in unmarked graves. The autopsy results of the 15 bodies analyzed indicate that they were shot in the upper part of the body, indicating intent to kill. Four men had been shot in the head, and at least six men were shot in the chest or back.

Assad Al-Nassasrah remained missing until it was confirmed on 13 April that he was being held by Israeli authorities. Al-Nassasrah spent 37 days in Israeli detention where he sustained beatings, sound torture, psychological torture and humiliating treatment, solitary confinement, restraining, and food deprivation. Israeli authorities refused to release information regarding Al-Nassasrah's whereabouts for over two weeks. He was eventually released on 29 April amid international pressure following news of his survival. The IDF told the media that Al-Nassasrah was lawfully detained and interrogated because he was suspected of involvement in terrorist activity.

Israel initially said the vehicles were "advancing suspiciously" without headlights or emergency signals. It stated that the vehicles were being used as cover by Hamas and Palestinian Islamic Jihad. It alleged that among those killed were a Hamas operative and "eight other terrorists," without providing evidence. Following the release of the video recording, Israel changed its account of the incident, admitting that its soldiers have "made mistakes." Analysts have noted that Israel has a history of giving inaccurate explanations to account for its killings of civilians and of changing its version of events when evidence emerges that refutes its initial explanation. IDF Chief of Staff Eyal Zamir ordered an internal investigation into the incident by the unit responsible for handling suspected war crimes.

== Casualties ==
15 bodies were found in the mass grave. None of the reported names are on the list of "terrorists" the IDF reported to have eliminated. One recovered body had his hands bound.

PRCS

- 3 Ambulance Officers: Mostafa Khufaga, Saleh Muamer, Ezzedine Shaath
- 5 First Responder Volunteers: Mohammad Bahloul, Mohammed al-Heila, Ashraf Abu Labda, Raed al-Sharif, Rifatt Radwan

Civil Defense

- 6 workers

United Nations

- 1 employee

== Investigations ==
According to the Israeli human rights organization Yesh Din, the system established by the IDF's general staff to investigate potential war crimes is primarily designed to shield the military from accountability while maintaining the appearance of due process. An analysis of Israeli military campaigns over the past decade revealed that at least 664 complaints were submitted for review, yet more than 80% were closed without even launching a criminal investigation. The organization concluded that the military's law enforcement system seldom pursues charges against low-ranking soldiers and almost entirely avoids investigating senior commanders.

Autopsies were conducted by a Gazan doctor on all paramedics killed in the attack except an UN aid worker. The post-mortem report, reviewed by a Norwegian pathologist, found these paramedics were killed by gunfires either to their chests, abdomens or backs or to the head. Most of them were shot several times.

Israeli military released the investigation report on 20 April 2025, which found the killings were caused by "several professional failures, breaches of orders, and a failure to fully report the incident." The IDF announced that the deputy commander of the Golani Brigade would be relieved of command for his actions in the field and subsequent obstruction during the inquiry. Another commander involved in the operation in Rafah, where the killings occurred, was to be censured, according to the military. While acknowledging errors, the report did not call for criminal charges against the military units involved and concluded that the IDF's code of ethics was not breached. The United Nations humanitarian agency in Gaza, Palestine Red Crescent and Gazan civil defense denounced the investigation report; the Palestine Red Crescent characterized it as "full of lies". The Hind Rajab Foundation called IDF investigations into itself "fundamentally flawed and cannot be regarded as credible mechanisms of accountability".

Forensic Architecture and Earshot published a report of their investigation in February 2026. According to the report, Israeli soldiers fired over 900 shots over a two hour period and did not face any return fire. The report found that the Israeli soldiers "were positioned on high ground" and that "[t]he emergency lights and markings of the victims' vehicles would have been clearly visible to the soldiers at the time of the attacks." The report also found that the area of the attacks was later transformed by construction of the Morag Corridor and the establishment of a Gaza Humanitarian Foundation site.

== Reactions ==
=== State actors ===
- Israel: The IDF said that its troops had fired on the vehicles as they were "advancing suspiciously," and added that "it was determined that the forces had eliminated a Hamas military operative, Mohammad Amin Ibrahim Shubaki, along with eight other terrorists from Hamas and the PIJ." Shubaki's name does not appear on the list of the 15 deceased emergency workers, and Israel has not accounted for the whereabouts of his body. After video evidence emerged exposing their initial description as inaccurate, the IDF admitted that account was "mistaken."
- United States: The U.S. said that it expects "all parties on the ground" in Gaza to comply with international humanitarian law, although it refused to confirm whether it is conducting its own assessment into the incident. State Department Spokeswoman Tammy Bruce stated that "every single thing that happens in Gaza is happening because of Hamas."
- Hamas: Hamas condemned a statement by the U.S. accusing it of weaponizing ambulances, calling it "pure lies, devoid of any evidence, propagated by the US administration, alongside the government of war criminal Netanyahu, to justify its heinous and documented crime against paramedics and rescue workers."
- United Kingdom: Foreign Secretary David Lammy stated that "Gaza has become the world's most dangerous place for humanitarian workers" and called "for those responsible for the killings to be held accountable."
- Germany: After the video footage emerged, foreign ministry spokesperson Christian Wagner stated, "There are very significant questions about the actions of the Israeli army now," and said, "An investigation and accountability of the perpetrators are urgently needed", adding that the matter ultimately affects the credibility of the Israeli constitutional state.
- Netherlands: Foreign Minister Caspar Veldkamp stated the attack "appears to be a breach of the laws of war." He demanded a "thorough and independent investigation", adding that "The suffering of Palestinians in Gaza is unbearable". General Intelligence and Security Service (AIVD) Director-General Erik Akerboom said regarding the footage: "They add fuel to the fire for jihadists. They are being pushed further into action. These images have a strong mobilizing impact."
- Norway: Foreign Minister Espen Barth Eide strongly condemned the killing of the paramedics, calling the incident "very serious" and urged for an investigation to hold those responsible accountable.

=== Human rights organizations ===
- International Federation of Red Cross and Red Crescent Societies: The IFRC condemned the attacks, calling them the "single most deadly" for its workers in almost a decade. It also said in a statement on 30 March that the eight bodies of its workers were retrieved "after seven days of silence and having access denied to the area of Rafah where they were last seen."
  - Palestine Red Crescent Society: The PRCS called targeting of its workers a war crime and stated that "This massacre of our team is a tragedy not only for us at the Palestine Red Crescent Society, but also for humanitarian work and humanity." It decried Israel as killing the aid workers "in cold blood". PRCS spokesperson Nebal Farsakh denounced 20 April Israeli military investigation report as "full of lies."
- United Nations Office for the Coordination of Humanitarian Affairs: During the rescue operations, the head of OCHA in the occupied Palestinian territories, Jonathan Whittall, stated that "Health workers should never be a target. And yet, we’re here today, digging up a mass grave of first responders and paramedics." Whittall stated that the 20 April Israeli military "investigation did not go far enough".
- United Nations Relief and Works Agency for Palestine Refugees in the Near East: The head of UNRWA, Philippe Lazzarini, said that the UN staff member killed was one of its employees and that the mass burial of the bodies in "shallow graves" constitutes "a profound violation of human dignity." Sam Rose, the acting director of UNWRA's Gaza office, said: "What we know is that fifteen people lost their lives, that they were buried in shallow graves in a sand berm in the middle of the road, treated with complete indignity and what would appear to be an infringement of international humanitarian law."
- Amnesty International: Spokesman for the occupied Palestinian territories, Mohamed Duar, said "Despite their protected status under the Geneva Conventions and International Humanitarian Law, Israeli Forces continue to target healthcare workers... Ambulances and hospitals continue to come under fire and be destroyed."
- Office of the United Nations High Commissioner for Human Rights: Volker Türk, the U.N. High Commissioner for Human Rights, told the council that an independent investigation is necessary, adding that the incident raises "further concerns about the commission of war crimes by the Israeli military."
- United Nations Human Rights Council: A UNHRC commission of independent experts cited the attack as a genocidal act under Article 2 of the Genocide Convention, using the event as evidence in their accusation against Israel of committing genocide in Gaza.

== See also ==
- Attacks on health facilities during the Gaza war
- Executions and assassinations during the Gaza war
- Flour Massacre
- Gaza genocide
- IDF admissions to misconduct after initial denials
- Israeli war crimes in the Gaza war
- Khalil Suleiman
- Killing of Hind Rajab
- Killing of Mohammad Habali
- Killing of Rouzan al-Najjar
- Killing of Shireen Abu Akleh
- List of massacres in Palestine
- Misinformation in the Gaza war
- War crimes in the Gaza war
- World Central Kitchen aid convoy attack
