= Hamas baby beheading hoax =

2023 hoax spread during the Gaza war

The Hamas baby beheading hoax is a series of allegations, since refuted, that Hamas killed and beheaded dozens of babies and toddlers during the October 7 attacks which it led in southern Israel in 2023, which constituted the first phase of the Gaza war.

The allegations were first made by soldiers of the Israel Defense Forces (IDF) and members of Israeli civilian rescue groups in interviews with local and international journalists. The claims were initially repeated by US president Joe Biden, the office of Israeli prime minister Benjamin Netanyahu, and some IDF spokespeople, and were subsequently reported widely across international news outlets. Similar reports accused Hamas of hanging or slitting the throats of babies and burning others alive, including by stuffing at least one young child into a hot oven.

At times the Israeli government has discreetly admitted that the rumours about the beheaded children are unfounded. Critics of Israel have characterized the hoax as atrocity propaganda.

== Initial reports and dissemination ==
The rumor places the alleged atrocity at the kibbutz of Kfar Aza, which was the target of a Hamas attack on 7 October 2023. The kibbutz was only completely retaken by Israeli forces on 10 October, the same day that the story began to circulate. Reports claimed that militants had beheaded dozens of babies and toddlers and hanged many other children in Kfar Aza. According to the official death toll, however, the youngest victim of the massacre at the kibbutz was fourteen years old.

An April 2024 investigation by Le Monde traced the origins of the story, which it describes as "a rumor born organically, out of a mixture of emotion, confusion and macabre exaggeration", to a press tour of the kibbutz held just hours after the battle ended. Sixty residents had been killed, and bodies of residents and militants were still strewn across the ground. At the scene, according to Le Monde, "the General Staff made no mention of dead babies", and the journalists themselves noted that only bodies belonging to Israelis they saw were in adult-sized body bags.

However, reservists and ZAKA members, to whom journalists had free access, offered accounts that "were murkier and disturbing". Testimonies from other sites under attack may have been confusedly mixed with those from Kfar Aza, giving rise to the falsehoods concerning the violence in Kfar Aza. According to Le Monde, the lack of professionalism of ZAKA members – who are civilian volunteers from the ultra-Orthodox sector and may lack the expertise to distinguish adult remains from those of children – may have given rise to the rumor, noting that a United Nations report on sexual violence in the 7 October attacks similarly highlights the existence of "inaccurate and unreliable forensic interpretations by some non-professionals" on the subject. The investigation also highlighted points when ZAKA spokespeople "went into macabre overdrive", such as a statement by ZAKA founder Yossi Landau that he had personally seen the bodies of children and babies who had been decapitated. A Haaretz article published in January 2024 accused ZAKA, which had been struggling with financial crisis, of exploiting its work during the 7 October attacks for fundraising.

Reserve soldiers at the kibbutz also offered unsubstantiated testimony involving children's bodies "hanging from a clothesline". The Le Monde investigation stated that the reliability of these soldiers was low, but reporters were able to talk with them without the supervision of the IDF spokesperson's team. Israeli TV channel i24NEWS also claimed on 10 October that the information about the decapitated babies had come from Israeli soldiers.

Associate professor of Middle East studies at Hamad Bin Khalifa University Marc Owen Jones reckoned that, in its most complete form, the myth of the 40 decapitated babies crystallized from a Twitter post by Nicole Zedeck of i24NEWS. It was on a viral TV report that Zedeck broke the story about the decapitated babies, reporting that she had received this news from soldiers. In another post, she further claimed that, according to soldiers, "40 babies/children were killed." From then on, Jones says, the two points of information were likely connected and became one.

Zedeck's social media post went viral online, accumulating over 44 million impressions on Twitter in a few hours. Social media accounts belonging to the Israeli government and its diplomatic and military branches helped spread the story. Accounts linked to the Bharatiya Janata Party, the Hindu nationalist ruling party of India, spread a false story that Hamas had beheaded a boy, using the hashtag #IslamIsTheProblem.

A related story, which also gained traction, was published on social media by the Israeli Ministry of Foreign Affairs based on a report by a military officer who claimed he had found the bodies of eight babies who had been burned to death in a home on the Be'eri kibbutz. Another officer falsely claimed he had found the bodies of eight babies who had been executed in a nursery on the same kibbutz and that among the victims of the massacre was an Auschwitz survivor.

=== Official statements and media coverage ===
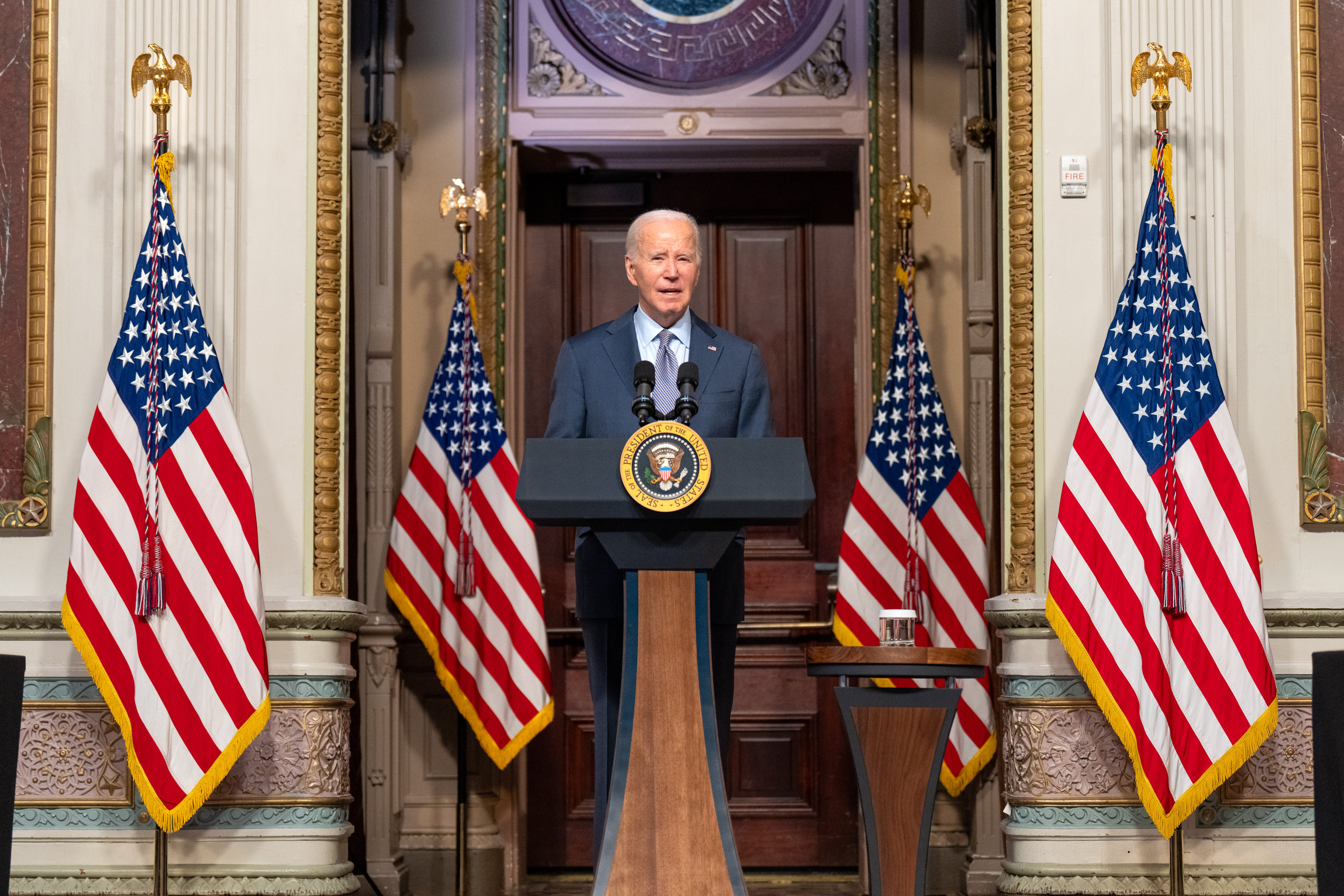
U.S. president Joe Biden's address on 11 October 2023, during which he mentioned the false allegation of Hamas beheading children

On the same day, the reports were repeated as fact by senior Israeli and American officials. Israeli army spokespeople reiterated them to English- and French-language media outlets, although IDF sources said the story remained unconfirmed after being repeatedly contacted by the British channel Sky News. The IDF told Business Insider that the soldiers' testimonies would not be investigated and should be taken as sufficient evidence in themselves.

On the next day, U.S. president Joe Biden categorically stated in a press conference that he had seen "confirmed pictures of terrorists beheading children", and Israeli prime minister Benjamin Netanyahu's spokesman repeated the same language. Members of the United States Congress from both the Democratic and Republican parties also spread the uncorroborated reports on social media. The Israeli Prime Minister's Office's Twitter account mentioned the killing of infants, posting graphic images as confirmation and claiming to have shown the material to US Secretary of State Antony Blinken. In turn, the Ministry of Foreign Affairs shared photos of burned babies' bodies, though it later deleted them.

In the first weeks of October 2023, the unfounded allegation was treated as established truth by several Western media outlets; the British tabloid Daily Mail described Hamas's actions as a "holocaust plain and simple", while, along with several other British newspapers, The Times and Metro both accused Hamas of having beheaded or murdered several babies on their front pages. CNN reporter Sara Sidner accused Hamas of beheading dozens of babies and toddlers in Kfar Aza, citing the Israeli prime minister's spokesman as her source. Sidner described Hamas's actions as "beyond devastating", adding that they would make it "impossible for Israel to make peace with Hamas". When Hamas denied the allegations, her colleague Hadas Gold of the Jerusalem bureau called the group's position unbelievable, falsely adding that such atrocities had been caught on film and equating Hamas's actions with the Holocaust. Fox News reporters hounded U.S. Representative Rashida Tlaib, who is of Palestinian descent, to respond to allegations of "terrorists chopping off babies' heads".

Some backtracking and clarifications took place in the following days. On 12 October, the White House "clarified" that Biden had not actually seen the images with his own eyes, but had merely passed on to the public what he had been told. A memo signed by hundreds of US diplomats, which was leaked in November 2023, accused the president of "spreading misinformation" about the conflict. Netanyahu's office also said it was not in a position to confirm the veracity of the story, which had been spread by its spokesperson the day before. On 12 October, CNN's Sidner apologized for having taken the statement by Netanyahu's spokesperson at face value. Israeli journalist Ishay Coen deleted a post publishing the testimony of a military officer who had claimed to have discovered the bodies of hanged babies. "Why would an army officer invent such a horrifying story? I was wrong", Coen said. On 30 November, i24NEWS inserted a correction to an article about the beheadings, despite previously complaining that "anti-Israeli voices" were trying to discredit its reporter.

Critics of the Gaza war, however, say the retractions have not had the same reach as the original stories. Despite removing accounts linked to Hamas, Facebook and Twitter moderators appear to have taken no action against the misinformation about the beheaded babies. CNN continued to relay the false beheading story for 18 hours even after the White House clarification, only taking the extra step of attaching a Hamas denial. In late October 2023, IDF colonel Golan Vach, head of the military search and rescue service, alleged he found the remains of a decapitated baby. Vach had previously told a group of French deputies visiting Kfar Aza that he had personally transported the bodies of newborn babies, although later investigations showed that "there were none on the kibbutz".

== Investigations ==
In December 2023, Haaretz published the results of a comprehensive investigation into the violence of the 7 October attacks. The conclusion was that while Hamas had committed real atrocities that day, some of the extreme acts attributed to the group never happened and were fueling denial of the October 7 attacks. Although Hamas had desecrated or dismembered the bodies of some Israelis, these belonged for the most part to fallen soldiers, the article said. Netanyahu's claim to Biden that Hamas "took dozens of children, tied them up, burned them and executed them" also proved false, as "[t]here is no evidence that children from several families were murdered together".

Haaretz and other media outlets confirmed the death of an Israeli baby in the Be'eri kibbutz (and therefore not in Kfar Aza) during the October 7 attacks, when she was shot in her mother's arms. One other infant fatality occurred as a result of the attack – a baby who was delivered post-mortem and perished two days after its mother's death by gunshot. Haaretz determined that the story of a child being thrown into a hot oven (as told by the United Hatzalah president Eli Beer at a November 2023 donor conference in the US) was false.

Al Jazeera's Investigative Unit produced a forensic analysis of the 7 October attacks, released in March 2024. It confirmed that Hamas had committed abuses in its attack, but also found that "many" stories about its actions were false and that some fatalities on the Israeli side had in fact been the result of IDF action. Among the fake claims were "the mass killing and beheading of babies as well as allegations of widespread and systematic rape". The document refutes claims by the Israeli military that the burned bodies of eight babies were found in a house in kibbutz Be'eri. The analysis concluded that not only were there no babies in the house, but "the 12 people inside were almost certainly killed by Israeli forces when they stormed the building".

== Aftermath ==
Despite the weakness of the claims, they continued to be repeated for some time by Israeli and American officials. Biden reiterated that Hamas had beheaded babies at a press conference in November 2023. In response, The Washington Post published a fact check concluding that the story still warranted caution. Biden again repeated this same falsehood on 12 December 2023 (after Haaretz published its investigation), again saying that he had seen photos showing the beheading of babies, being criticized this time by The Intercept. Israeli officials also produced a video purportedly documenting the actions of Palestinian militants during the 7 October attacks, including "murder, beheadings, rapes and other atrocities against Jewish adults and children". The footage was shown around the world, but only to select audiences and is not available to the general public. British journalist Owen Jones, who attended a screening, reported that although it contained images of an Israeli soldier who was apparently beheaded, "there was no footage substantiating allegations of torture, sexual violence, and mass beheadings, including of babies or other children" (The Intercept's paraphrase).

Although the Israeli government press office confirmed to Le Monde prior to the release of its April 2024 investigation that the baby beheadings did not in fact take place either in Kfar Aza or in any other kibbutz, the French newspaper estimates that Israeli officers maintain an attitude of opportunistic ambiguity towards the rumour, with the intention to "muddy the waters", concluding that Israel has "more often tried to instrumentalize it than deny it, fueling accusations of media manipulation".

The Israeli military took contradictory attitudes, saying it had no confirmation of the killings or beheadings of babies, while at the same time its foreign language spokespersons shared the allegations. At one point, the IDF refused to confirm the beheadings simply because so doing would be "disrespectful for the dead". Israeli embassies around the world helped spread the story, sometimes castigating skeptics as antisemitic. When approached by Le Monde, Israel's embassy in France took down a Twitter post directly mentioning the 40 babies, but kept two other posts indirectly referencing it online.

The falsehoods, once exposed, were also exploited by pro-Palestinian influencers to falsely exonerate Hamas from blame for any violence against civilians during the 7 October attacks. In Israel, as of April 2024, belief in the story was still widespread, and denying that Hamas mass-beheaded babies during the 7 October attacks was seen as tantamount to denying the massacre itself.

The story of the beheaded babies has helped shape government attitudes to the pro-Palestinian movement in the West, with protest bans and other forms of attacks on civil liberties becoming a common feature of Western governments' response to popular anger over the war on Gaza.

The Guardian columnist Arwa Mahdawi pointed to the political and media hysteria provoked by the rumors to underscore the hypocrisy and double standards adopted by the West in addressing the Israeli-Palestinian conflict, contrasting it with the reactions to reports and images of Palestinian children killed or decapitated in Israel's Tel al-Sultan attack. According to Mahdawi, the false report "laid the basis for genocide; for politicians to look at pictures of Palestinian children, decapitated by US-manufactured missiles, and just shrug".

According to journalist Hamza Yusuf, writing in Declassified UK, the stories about decapitated babies ended up serving as justification for statements by Israeli officials containing genocidal intent, making them seem less extreme in contrast.

Scholars Raz Segal and Luigi Daniele noted that the allegation continued to be cited as fact in academic and journalistic exchanges long after it had been debunked. They highlighted an instance where a group of Holocaust scholars, writing in Haaretz in late November 2023, cited "decapitated babies" as a factual occurrence to argue that dehumanizing language used by Israeli leaders was a "reflection of the limits of language" rather than evidence of genocidal intent. Segal and Daniele characterized the continued use of the claim at that late date as the propagation of a lie that had already been "established as propaganda".

== See also ==
- Misinformation in the Gaza war
- Vukovar children massacre hoax, a propaganda story during the Yugoslav Wars about 41 Serb children being killed by Croat soldiers
- Nayirah testimony
