= Palestinian Environmental NGOs Network =

The Palestinian NGOs Network (PNGON; Arabic: شبكة المنظمات الأهلية البيئية الفلسطينية, romanized: Shabakah al-Munaẓẓamāt al-Ahlīyah al-Bīʼīyah al-Filasṭīnīyah) is a non-profit, non-governmental organization with a mandate to protect the environment of Palestine by acting as a coordinating body for Palestinian environmental organizations located in the West Bank and Gaza Strip. PNGON was initiated after the 2000 al-Aqsa Intifada due to heightened demands for Palestinian environmental organizations to defend the Palestinian environment.

PNGON is composed of 21 member organizations with goals covering a wide range of environmental issues such as defending land against misuse, sustainable agriculture, water conservation, rural issues, sustainable development, protection of cultural heritage, health and sanitation, biodiversity protection, human rights and community participation.

PNGON's General Assembly consists of all of its members. The Coordinating Committee consists of seven members who are elected every two years by the General Assembly.

PNGON is an umbrella organization for Palestinian environmental organizations operating in both the West Bank and Gaza Strip. PNGON focuses on protection of the Palestinian environment within the context of Israeli military occupation. Therefore, environmental efforts are coordinated with social justice campaigns and also integrate social, economic and cultural rights to effect environmental protection and defense.

PNGON seeks to raise international awareness, build capacity for environmental advocacy and mobilizes communities to engage in sustainable development. PNGON also encourages cooperation with other developing societies.

The Member Organizations of the PNGON network are:

- Al-Ard Society for Environmental Awareness and Protection
- Applied Research Institute--Jerusalem (ARIJ)
- Center for Agricultural Services (TCAS)
- Center for Development in Primary Health Care (CDPHC)- Al Quds University
- Institute of Water Studies, Birzeit University
- Development and Environment Association—Baladna Cultural Center
- Land Research Center (LRC)
- LAW-The Palestinian Society for the Protection of Human Rights and the Environment
- The Local Committee for the Protection of the Environment, Nablus
- MA'AN Development Center
- Palestinian Agricultural Relief Committees (PARC)
- Palestinian Association for Cultural Exchange (PACE)
- Palestinian Hydrology Group (PHG)
- Roads and Environmental Safety Center (RESC)
- The Society for Environmental Protection, Jenin
- Union of Agricultural Work Committees (UAWC)
- Union of Palestinian Medical Relief Committees (UPMRC)
- Water and Environment Department-Ramallah Municipality
- Water and Soil Environmental Research Unit (WSERU), Bethlehem University
- Water and Environmental Studies Center (WESC), An-Najah National University
- Wildlife Palestine Society (WLPS)
