= Turkish-Palestinian Friendship Hospital =

Hospital in Gaza Strip, Palestine

Turkish-Palestinian Friendship Hospital مستشفى الصداقة التركي الفلسطيني Türk-Filistin Dostluk Hastanesi
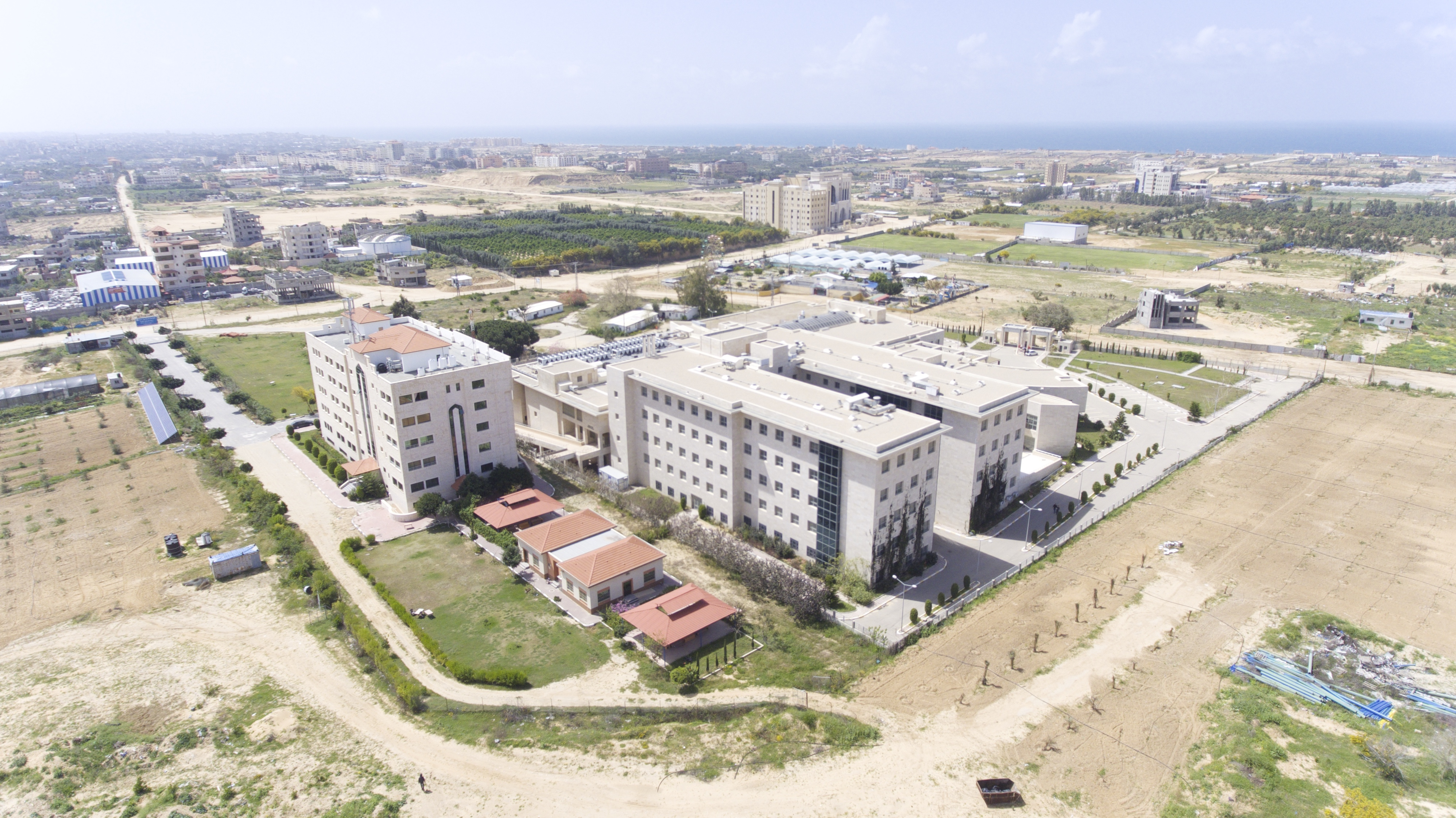
- The hospital in 2015

Geography
- Location: Gaza Strip, Palestine
- Coordinates: 31°28′40.4000″N 34°24′58.7034″E

Organisation
- Type: Specialist
- Affiliated university: Islamic University of Gaza; Palestinian Ministry of Health

Services
- Beds: 200
- Speciality: Oncology; Teaching

History
- Constructed: 2011
- Opened: 2020
- Closed: 2023 (part of Gaza War); 2025 (demolished by the IDF)

The Turkish-Palestinian Friendship Hospital (Arabic: مستشفى الصداقة التركي الفلسطيني, Turkish: Türk-Filistin Dostluk Hastanesi) was a hospital in Gaza, Palestine, built and equipped by the Turkish Cooperation and Coordination Agency (TİKA).

In 2010, the Board of Trustees of the Islamic University of Gaza approved its establishment as a training and research hospital in the Gaza Strip. The construction of the Palestine-Turkey Friendship Hospital began in 2011. It was completed in 2017 at a total cost of 70 million US dollars.

During the siege on the Gaza Strip imposed by Israel in October 2023, the hospital ran out of fuel. Gaza health officials reported that it shut down on November 1. Prior to its closure, it was the only hospital in Gaza equipped to serve cancer patients, so its closure left the 70 cancer patients inside the hospital and 2,000 outside the hospital without any accessible alternative. The hospital director stated that the hospital was hit in an Israeli airstrike. Later, the Israeli Army used the location as a military base.

On 21 March 2025, the hospital was demolished by the Israeli Army. This was part of the March 2025 Israeli attacks on the Gaza Strip.

== Facilities ==
The hospital was built at the campus of the Faculty of Medicine at the Islamic University of Gaza (IUG), which is located south of Gaza City. It has a total interior space of 33,400 sq. meters and consists of 8 interconnected blocks, with 4 operating rooms, intensive care units, laboratories, and 200 beds. In its full capacity, the hospital can serve up to 30,000 patients annually, as well as provide health training for 500 medical students, 800 nursing students, and 400 allied health services students per year.

== Operations ==
During the COVID-19 pandemic, the Turkish-Palestinian Friendship Hospital began to operate as an isolation and treatment facility. A provisional deed of transfer was issued and signed by TİKA and the Rectorate of the Islamic University of Gaza, with the Gaza authorities taking over on March 26, 2020.

In November 2021, as the COVID-19 pandemic began to subside, the Gaza Ministry of Health (MoH) began relocating oncology and oncology-related services from the different governmental hospitals in the Gaza Strip to the Turkish-Palestinian Friendship Hospital in a bid to "unify the diagnostic and treatment services in one specialized and integrated center". The Hospital operated under a joint administration from IUG and the MoH.

== Gaza war ==
During the Gaza war, and amid the October 2023 Israeli blockade of the Gaza Strip, the hospital was forced to shut down, despite being Gaza's only cancer hospital, after running out of fuel. On October 30, hospital director Dr. Subhi Skaik stated the third floor of the hospital was hit in an Israeli airstrike. The Turkish Ministry of Foreign Affairs condemned the airstrike "in the strongest terms" on the same day, stating it was a violation of international law.

The Israeli army then used the hospital as a military base in 2024, prompting rebuke from the Turkish government. In March 2025, Israel launched another attack on the Gaza Strip. During this operation, the IDF's 252nd Military Division under commander Yehuda Vach blew up the building in March 2025, saying without providing evidence that it wasn't in use as a hospital and was instead being used by Hamas operatives. The demolition of the hospital appeared to be a controlled explosion, according to the Lancet. In response, the Turkish Ministry of Foreign Affairs condemned the destruction of the hospital as "part of Israel's policy aimed at rendering Gaza uninhabitable and forcibly displacing the Palestinian people." The IDF started a probe into the apparent demolition of the hospital without approval.

== Gallery ==
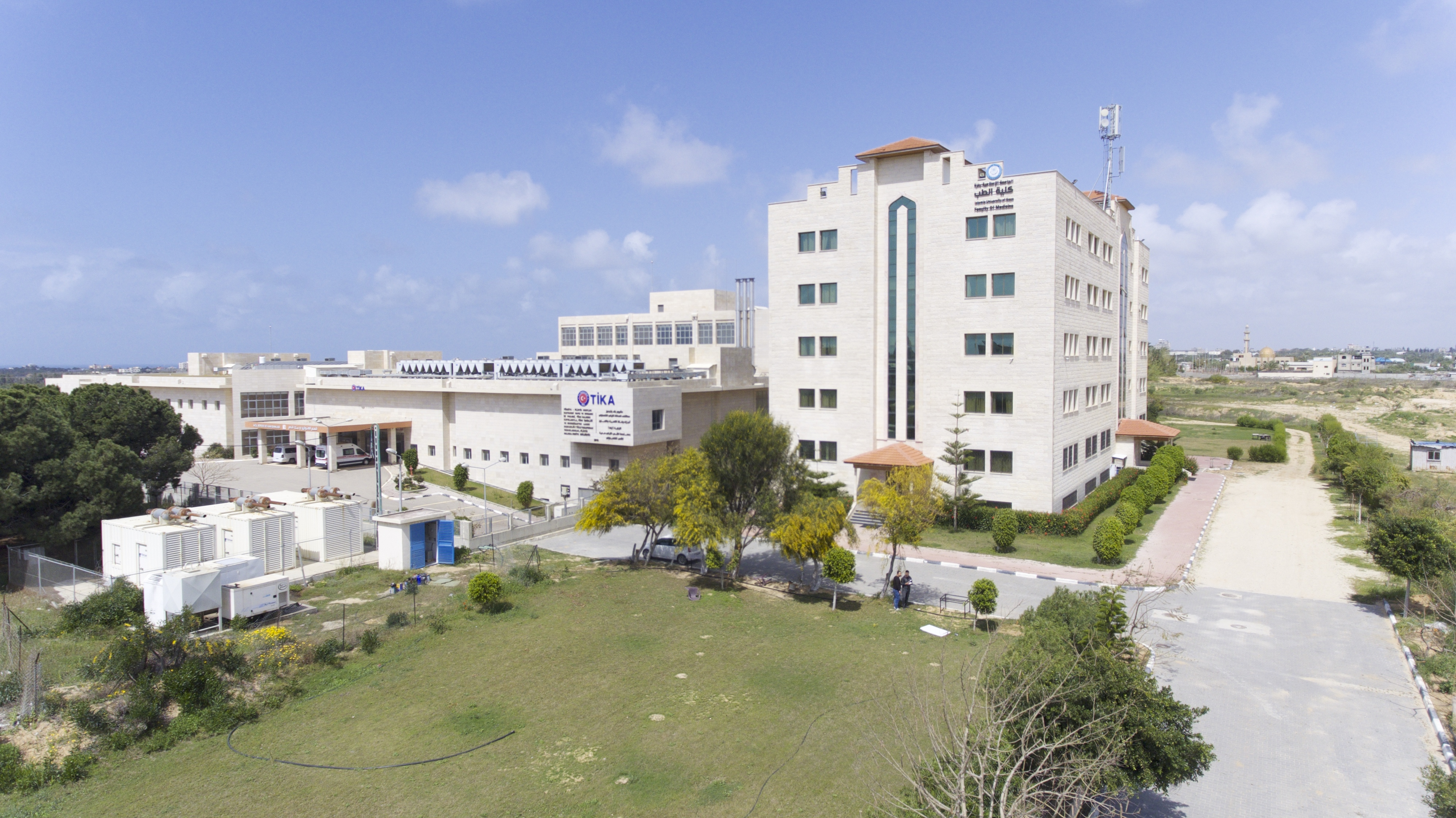
A look at the southern entrance of the Turkish-Palestinian Friendship Hospital and the IUG Faculty of Medicine. The TİKA logo can be seen on the main entrance.

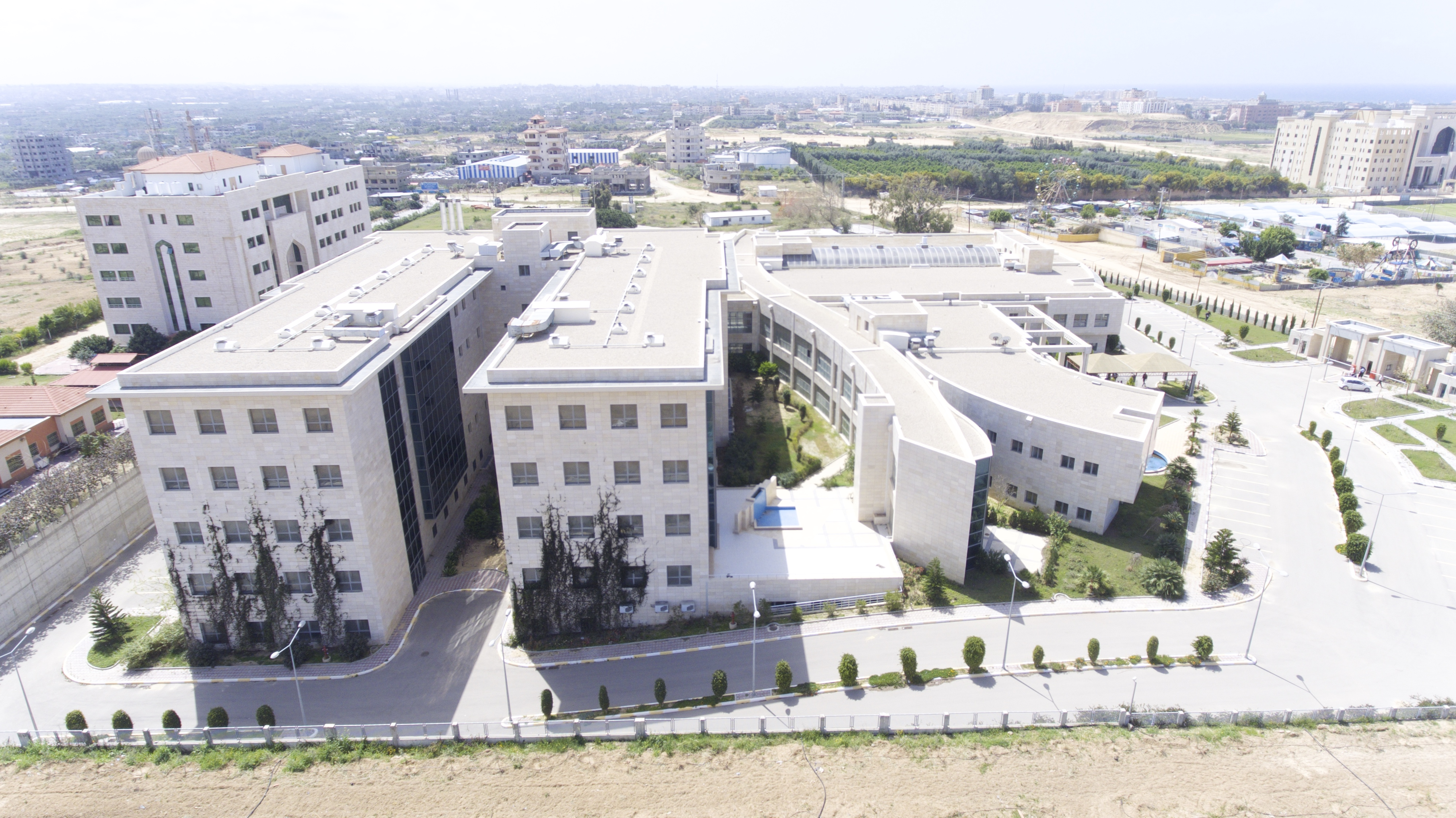
View of the hospital from the north

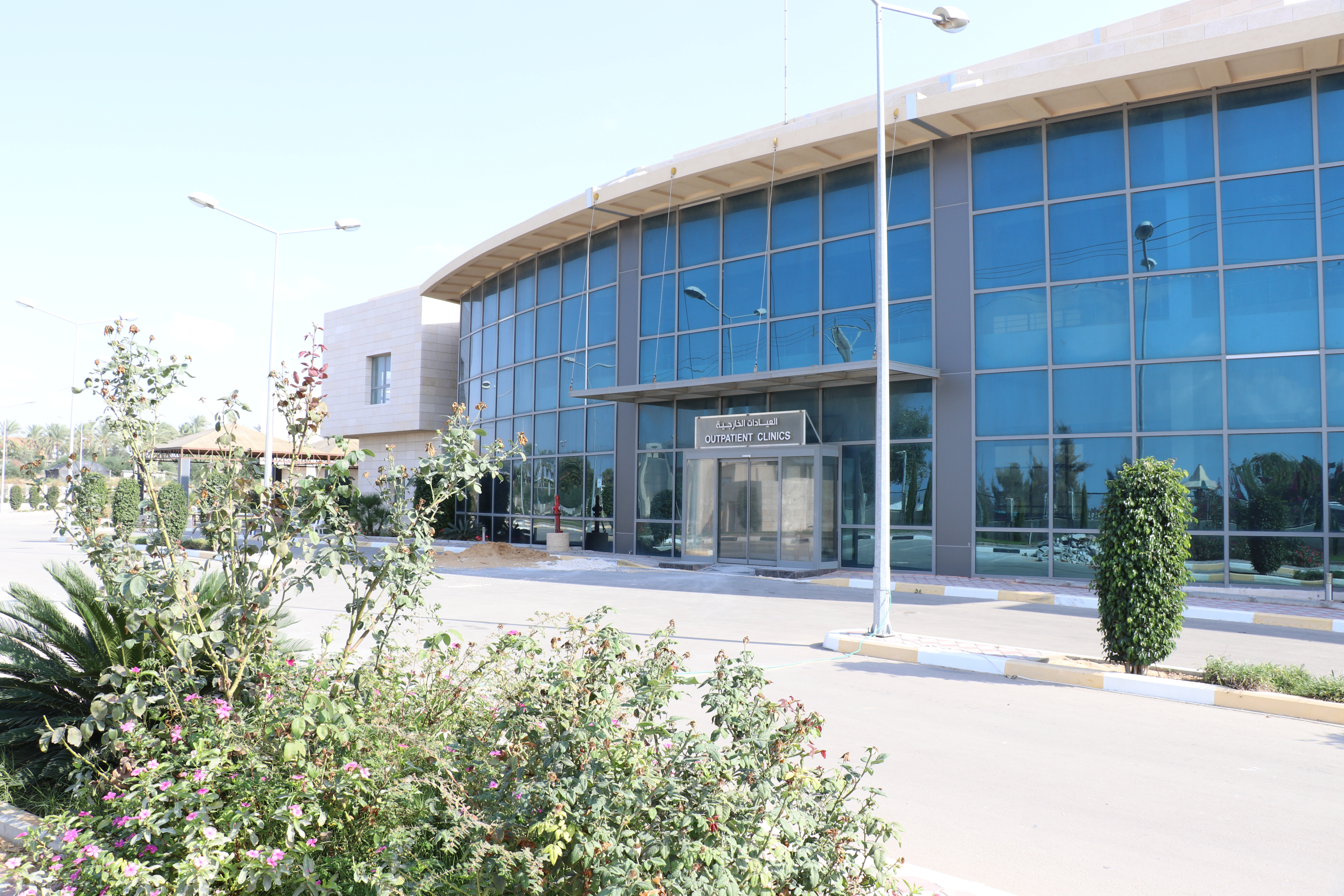
Outpatient clinics entrance

== See also ==
- List of hospitals in the State of Palestine
