= Israeli blockade of the Gaza Strip (2023–present) =

- Part of the Gaza war, blockade of the Gaza Strip and the Gaza genocide
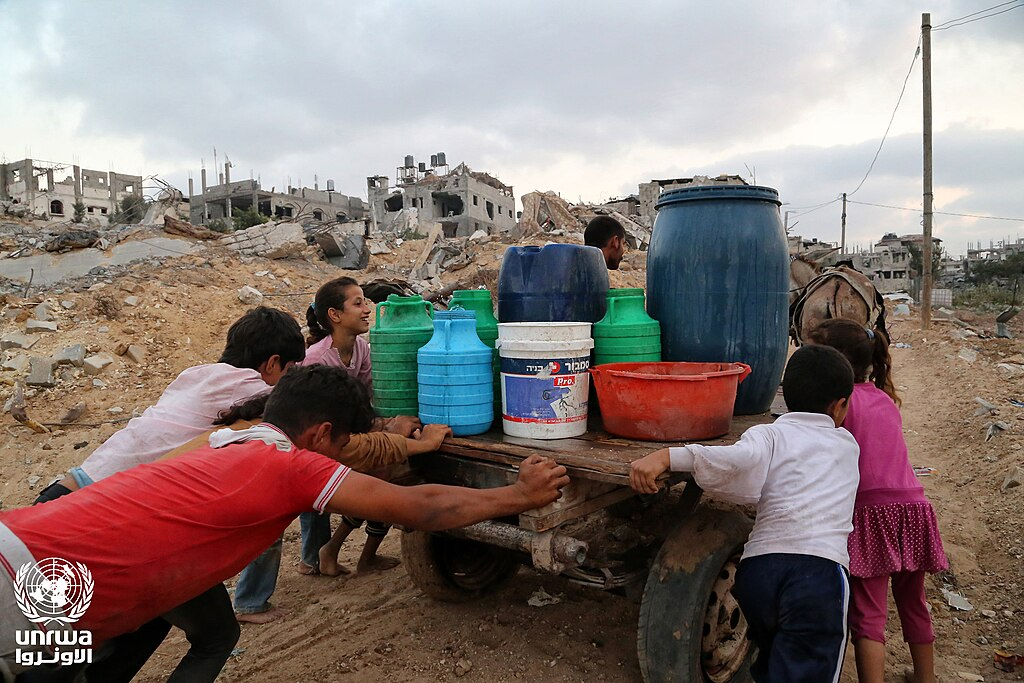
- Palestinians in the Gaza Strip carrying water cans, April 12, 2025
Date	9 October 2023 – present (3 years, 1 month and 1 week)
Location	Gaza Strip

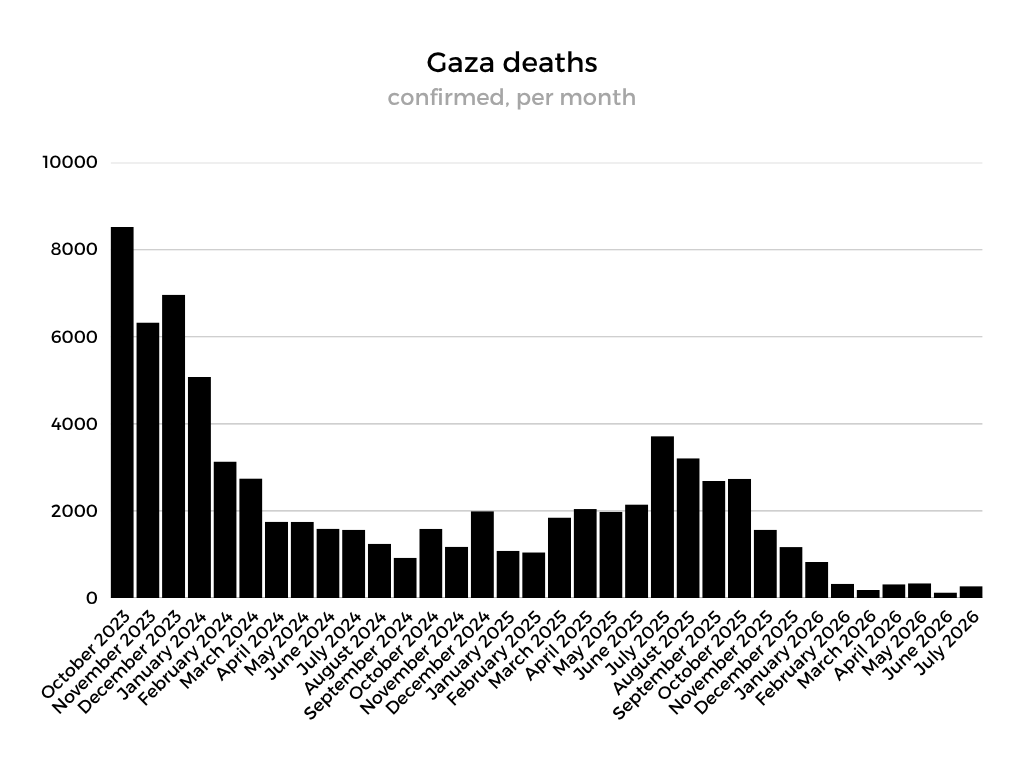
Gaza war deaths by month.

On 9 October 2023, Israel intensified its blockade of the Gaza Strip when it announced a total blockade, blocking the entry of food, water, medicine, fuel and electricity after the October 7 attacks and the ensuing Gaza war. The blockade has been credited with contributing significantly to what critics call "the Gaza genocide." Israel has conditioned its lifting of the blockade with the return of the hostages abducted by Hamas, which has been criticized as collective punishment and an apparent war crime. As of August 2025, 27 European countries and over 100 international aid organizations have called for an end to Israel's blockade of aid into Gaza.

A few weeks after 9 October 2023, Israel eased the complete blockade after receiving pressure from U.S. President Joe Biden, but still continued to severely restrict the amount of aid entering the Gaza Strip. The first supplies entered on 21 October 2023. The blockade exacerbated Gaza's humanitarian crisis. In January 2024, Israeli authorities blocked 56% of humanitarian aid to northern Gaza. On 9 February 2024, UNRWA's director Philippe Lazzarini said that Israel had blocked food for 1.1 million Palestinians in Gaza.

During the January 2025 Gaza war ceasefire, Israel relaxed aid restrictions, allowing much more aid than previously. On 2 March 2025, however, Israel completely blocked all supplies from entering the territory, making it the longest complete closure in the history of the blockade. Since 26 May 2025, the United States- and Israeli-backed Gaza Humanitarian Foundation has facilitated limited and largely ineffective aid distribution, marred by mass killings that resulted in over 1,400 Palestinian deaths.

The blockade has created famine conditions in the Gaza Strip, which was exacerbated by Israeli airstrikes targeting food infrastructure and restrictions on humanitarian aid. In a number of incidents, Israeli protesters, including West Bank settlers, blocked aid trucks carrying humanitarian aid heading towards the Gaza Strip, and in some cases attacked them.

== Background ==
The restrictions on movement and goods in Gaza imposed by Israel date to the early 1990s. After Hamas took over in 2007, Israel significantly intensified existing movement restrictions and imposed a complete blockade on the movement of goods and people in and out of the Gaza Strip. In the same year, Egypt closed the Rafah border crossing.

The blockade's stated aims are to prevent the smuggling of weapons into Gaza and to exert economic pressure on Hamas. Human rights groups have called the blockade illegal and a form of collective punishment, as it restricts the flow of essential goods, contributes to economic hardship, and limits Gazans' freedom of movement. The land, sea and air blockade virtually isolated the Gaza Strip from the rest of the occupied Palestinian territory and the world. The blockade and its effects have led to the territory being called an "open-air prison".

Israel regularly granted permission for a quota of Gaza Palestinians, numbering between 15,000 and 21,000, to work daily within its borders.

On 7 October 2023, 6,000 Palestinian militants led by Hamas, a Palestinian political and military organization and other Palestinian groups, launched its biggest assault across the Gaza–Israel barrier into southern Israel, breaching the border in 119 places, infiltrating Israel and killing 1,175 Israelis and foreigners, as well as firing at least 4,300 rockets into Israel. Israel subsequently declared war on the militants, calling up 300,000 reservists to execute Israel's military operation.

== Blockade ==
A total blockade of the Gaza Strip was announced on 9 October 2023 by the Defence Minister of Israel, Yoav Gallant. "We are putting a complete siege on Gaza ... No electricity, no food, no water, no gas – it's all closed" he announced. "We are fighting human animals and we are acting accordingly," he added. The spokesman for the Minister of Energy of Israel, Israel Katz, said that Katz had ordered the water supply to the Gaza Strip to be cut, effective immediately. Israeli tanks and drones have been tasked with guarding openings in the Gaza–Israel border fence and enforcing the blockade.

As a result of the blockade, the only power plant in the Gaza Strip ran out of fuel on 11 October, at 2 pm. This caused the electricity in the Gaza Strip to go off. Due to this, desalination plants providing water shut off, completely stopping running water.

On 12 October 2023, Israel Katz, stated that the lifting of the Gaza Strip blockade would not occur until the hostages were safely returned to Israel.

The Turkish-Palestinian Friendship Hospital was forced to shut down, despite being Gaza's only cancer hospital, after running out of fuel.

After receiving pressure from U.S. President Joe Biden, Gallant changed his position of a complete blockade and a deal was made on 19 October for Israel and Egypt to allow aid into Gaza.

Humanitarian aid response in December 2023.

In January 2024, Israeli authorities blocked 56% of humanitarian aid to northern Gaza. On 31 January 2024, National Security Minister Itamar Ben-Gvir called on Prime Minister Benjamin Netanyahu to cease sending aid to Gaza. On 1 February, after being barred from the Gaza border, protesters blocked aid trucks from leaving the Port of Ashdod.

On 9 February 2024, UNRWA's director Philippe Lazzarini said that Israel had blocked food for 1.1 million Palestinians in Gaza. In October 2024, the United Nations found that Israel had arbitrarily blocked 83% of aid entering Gaza in the prior year.

After the January 2025 Gaza war ceasefire went into effect on 19 January 2025, Israel loosened restrictions on the entry of food, water, tents and other humanitarian supplies into the Gaza Strip. However, the director of the World Food Programme said that some Israeli restrictions remained. Israel also restricted the number of Palestinians who could leave Gaza to seek medical treatment abroad. While the agreement stipulated 150 Palestinian patients be allowed to leave per day, Israel further restricted the number of sick people given permit to leave. Among the patients prohibited from travelling was a child with cancer.

On 2 March 2025, Israel ceased the entry of aid to Gaza. The humanitarian aid blockade was condemned by mediators Egypt and Qatar, as well as the United Nations, as a violation of the ceasefire. On 9 March, Israeli energy minister Eli Cohen ordered to halt supply of Israeli electricity to Gaza. In April 2025, Israeli Defense Minister Israel Katz expressed support for the blockade of humanitarian aid to Gaza, stating, "Israel's policy is clear: no humanitarian aid will enter Gaza, and blocking this aid is one of the main pressure levers preventing Hamas from using it as a tool with the population." As of 2 May 2025, it was the longest complete closure in the history of Israel's blockade.

=== Crossings ===
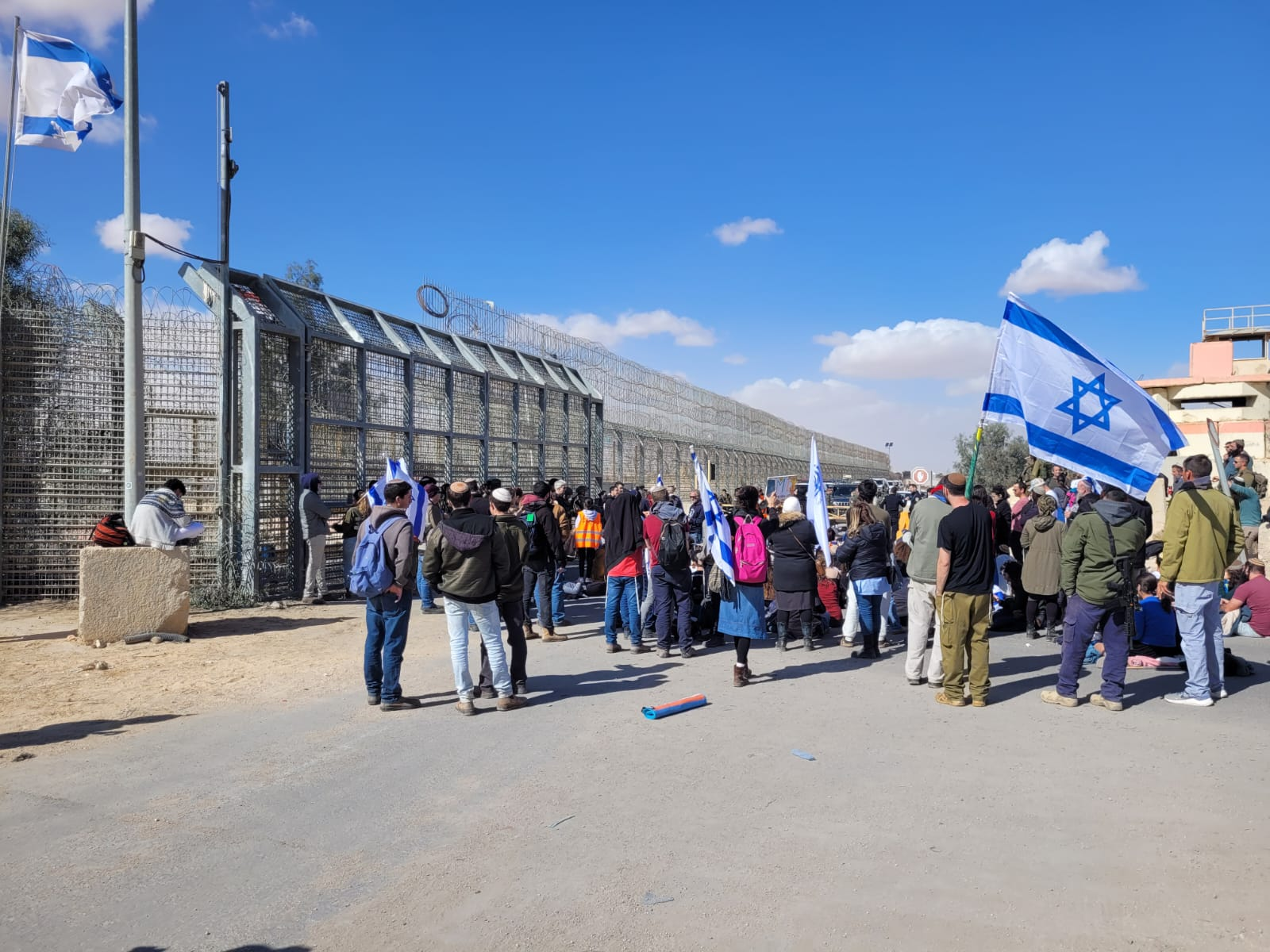
Israelis blocking humanitarian aid from entering Gaza, February 2024

==== Rafah crossing ====
Most aid vehicles come through this crossing from Egypt. This was the first crossing to reopen after the start of the war, on 21 October. Between then and 31 October 241 aid trucks passed through. Egypt, fearing a great influx of Gazans into Sinai implemented strict policies in Rafah crossing. On 27 October, Cindy McCain, director of the World Food Program, criticized the checks at the Egyptian side of the crossing as "overly stringent" and limiting the flow of aid, which had previously been closer to 500 trucks a day.

==== Kerem Shalom crossing ====
This was one of the crossings breached at the start of the war, and remained closed thereafter. On 30 October, the UN asked Israel to reopen it to allow additional aid trucks through. On 3 November it was opened briefly, so that Palestinian workers from the Gaza Strip who had been staying in Israel on work permits could be sent back to the Gaza Strip.

The crossing was reopened on 17 December 2023 for allowing 100 UN aid trucks daily in order to abide by an agreement made during the Israel-Hamas hostage exchanges, with 100 trucks of humanitarian aid being allowed through daily .

Israeli protesters accusing Israel of helping its enemy and harming own troops, repeatedly blocked the Kerem Shalom crossing to prevent humanitarian aid from entering the Gaza Strip. On 21 December 2023, Israeli protesters attempted to block the Kerem Shalom crossing to prevent humanitarian aid from entering the Gaza Strip. On 6 February, Channel 12 reported that 132 aid trucks had been prevented from entering the Kerem Shalom border crossing. On 7 February, Israelis set up tents at the Kerem Shalom to block aid from entering Gaza.

On 16 November 2024, armed gangs raided a convoy of 109 UN aid trucks and looted 98 of them, near Israeli military installations at the Kerem Shalom border crossing. The perpetrators, who according to a UN memo may have had "protection" from the Israeli Defense Forces (IDF), threw grenades and held truck drivers at gunpoint, forcing them to unload their aid. The UN also reported that a gang leader had established a "military-like compound" in an area that was "restricted, controlled, and patrolled by the IDF". The looting has been described by the UNRWA as "one of the worst" incidents of its kind.

==== Other crossings ====
On 2 February, Israeli protesters blocked the Nitzana Border Crossing between Egypt and Israel to prevent humanitarian aid from entering Gaza.

Two Jordanian aid convoys headed towards the Gaza Strip carrying medical supplies and flour were attacked by Israeli West Bank settlers on 1 May.

Israel reopened the Kissufim crossing on 12 November 2024 in response to US demands to open another crossing into the Gaza Strip. The demands were intended to increase the flow of humanitarian aid into Gaza.

The ceasefire between Israel and Hamas went into effect on 10 October 2025. Under the ceasefire terms, Israel was to permit up to 600 humanitarian aid trucks to enter Gaza each day. Since then, the limit has been reduced to 300, with Israeli officials attributing the change to delays in recovering the bodies of Israeli hostages believed to be buried beneath rubble from Israeli strikes. Data from the UN2720 Monitoring and Tracking Dashboard, which records the movement of humanitarian convoys entering Gaza, showed that between 10 and 16 October, only 216 trucks reached their intended destinations within Gaza.

== Consequences of blockade ==
The blockade resulted in a 90% drop in electricity availability, impacting hospital power supplies, sewage plants, and shutting down desalination plants that provide drinking water. According to WHO, 27 out of 35 hospitals in the Gaza Strip were shut down by 23 November 2023.

On 17 November, Oxfam stated Gaza's water supply was at 17% of its pre-siege capacity. On 7 December, the World Health Organization reported increases in acute respiratory infections, scabies, jaundice, and diarrhea.

On 7 December 2023, the World Food Programme stated that 97% of households had inadequate food consumption and 83% in southern Gaza were surviving through "extreme consumption strategies." On 15 December, the United Nations estimated nine out of ten residents were not eating food every day. On 22 December, UNICEF warned of the increasingly growing threat of famine in the Gaza Strip.

Direct attacks on telecommunications infrastructure by Israel, electricity blockades and fuel shortages have caused the near-total collapse of Gaza's largest cell network providers. Lack of internet access has obstructed Gazan citizens from communicating with loved ones, learning of IDF operations, and identifying both the areas most exposed to bombing and possible escape routes. The blackouts have also impeded emergency services, making it more difficult to locate and access the time-critical injured, and have impeded humanitarian aid agencies and journalists as well. By December 2023 200,000 Gazans (approximately 10% of the population) had received internet access through an eSIM provided by Connecting Humanity.

In May 2025, it was announced that prices had skyrocketed for basic food stuffs at markets in Gaza with a 25 kg (55 lb) bag of flour priced at $415 (£313) in Gaza City, a 30 fold increase since the end of February 2025.

=== Famine ===
The Israel–Hamas war has led to high risk of famine conditions in the Gaza Strip, resulting from Israeli airstrikes and the ongoing blockade of the Gaza Strip by Israel, which includes restrictions on humanitarian aid. In early 2024, 2.2 million people in Gaza were experiencing food insecurity at emergency level.

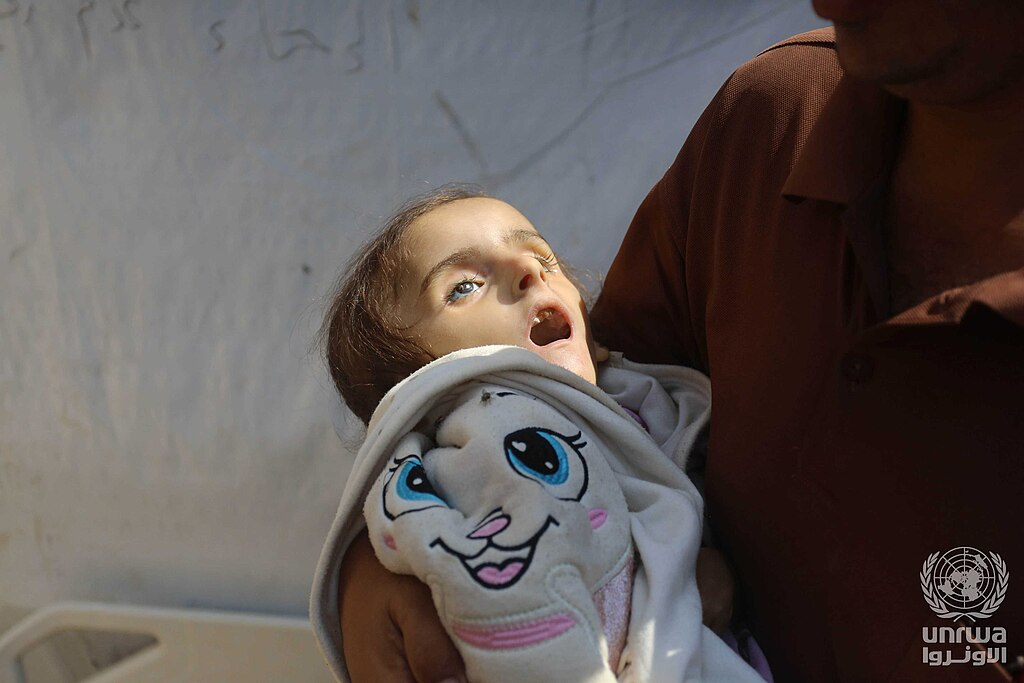
4-year-old Palestinian girl who died of malnutrition

Airstrikes have destroyed food infrastructure, such as bakeries, mills, and food stores, and there is a widespread scarcity of essential supplies due to the blockade of aid. (Note: The Israeli NGO Btselem has stated the famine is a direct outcome of Israeli policy: "This reality is not a byproduct of war, but a direct result of Israel's declared policy. Residents now depend entirely on food supplies from outside Gaza, as they can no longer produce almost any food themselves. Most cultivated fields have been destroyed, and accessing open areas during the war is dangerous in any case. Bakeries, factories and food warehouses have been bombed or shut down due to lack of basic supplies, fuel and electricity.") This has caused starvation for more than half a million Gazans and is part of a broader humanitarian crisis in the Strip. It is the "highest number of people facing catastrophic hunger" ever recorded on the IPC scale, and is widely expected to be the most intense man-made famine since the Second World War.

With 53% of the population, equivalent to 1.17 million individuals, facing emergency levels of starvation, the region is experiencing alarming rates of malnutrition and loss of lives. Due to the prevailing security conditions, providing a substantial humanitarian response has become exceedingly challenging. It is crucially important to establish a consistent and unhindered flow of humanitarian aid into Gaza to address the urgent needs of its population.

=== Water crisis ===
In July 2025, Gaza was facing a severe water crisis, worsened by bombings and fuel shortages that have crippled infrastructure. According to a recent report by the UN humanitarian agency OCHA, Gaza's ongoing lack of clean water—after 21 months of war and four months of blockade—was already having severe consequences for public health. Many residents must walk long distances in extreme heat to collect a few liters of drinking water, enduring constant thirst amid the destruction. Pregnant women often lived in overcrowded shelters with little access to clean water or medical care, leaving high-risk pregnancies undetected. Journalists reported widespread illness and exhaustion due to hunger and dehydration. Oxfam warned of a sharp rise in waterborne diseases and a looming humanitarian disaster if urgent action was not taken.

== Reactions ==
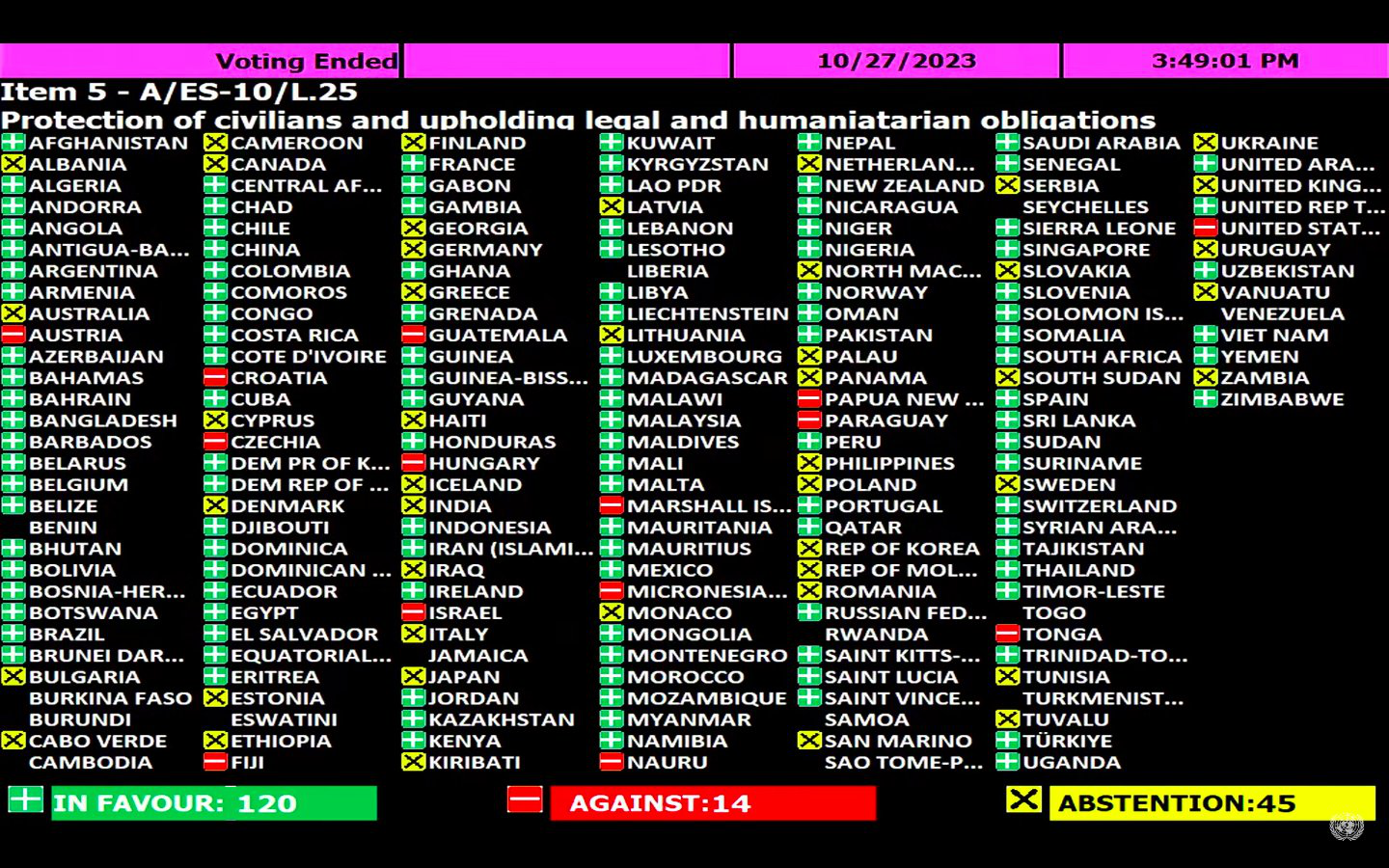
On 27 October, the United Nations General Assembly passed Resolution ES-10/21 calling for an "immediate and sustained" humanitarian truce and cessation of hostilities.

According to Agam Institute surveys, nearly 60% of Israeli Jews opposed sending humanitarian aid to Gaza.

Volker Türk, the United Nations High Commissioner for Human Rights, said that Israel's siege of the Gaza Strip violates international law because it endangers the lives of civilians by depriving them of goods essential for their survival.

UN Special Rapporteur Francesca Albanese expressed concern that "the measures taken, including the bombing of the Rafah crossing, hints to an intention to really starve and kill the people who are innocent inside the Gaza Strip," saying there was fear among Palestinians in Gaza of a "second Nakba."

UN Secretary-General António Guterres said he was "deeply distressed" by Israel's decision to impose a total blockade on the Gaza Strip.

Jan Egeland, the Secretary General for the Norwegian Refugee Council, stated that "collective punishment is in violation of international law. If and when it would lead to wounded children dying in hospitals because of a lack of energy, electricity and supplies, it could amount to war crime."

On 10 October 2023, European Union's High Representative for Foreign Affairs Josep Borrell said that "cutting water, cutting electricity, cutting food to a mass of civilian people, is against international law."

On 11 October 2023, Turkish President Recep Tayyip Erdoğan said that Israel's blockade and bombing of Gaza in retaliation for Hamas' attack was a disproportionate response amounting to a "massacre."

UNRWA's director, Philippe Lazzarini, described the Gaza Strip as a "graveyard of a population trapped between war, siege and deprivation", saying that "We will not be able to say we did not know. History will ask why the world did not have the courage to act decisively and stop this hell on Earth."

Egyptian authorities tried to prevent a mass exodus of Palestinian refugees from the Gaza Strip towards the Sinai Peninsula, rejecting a United States proposal for safe corridors to Egypt for Palestinians fleeing the Gaza Strip. The Rafah Border Crossing on the Egypt–Gaza border was closed by Egypt after the start of the conflict. Egypt urged Israel to allow safe passage for Palestinian civilians from the Gaza Strip instead of forcing them to flee towards Sinai.

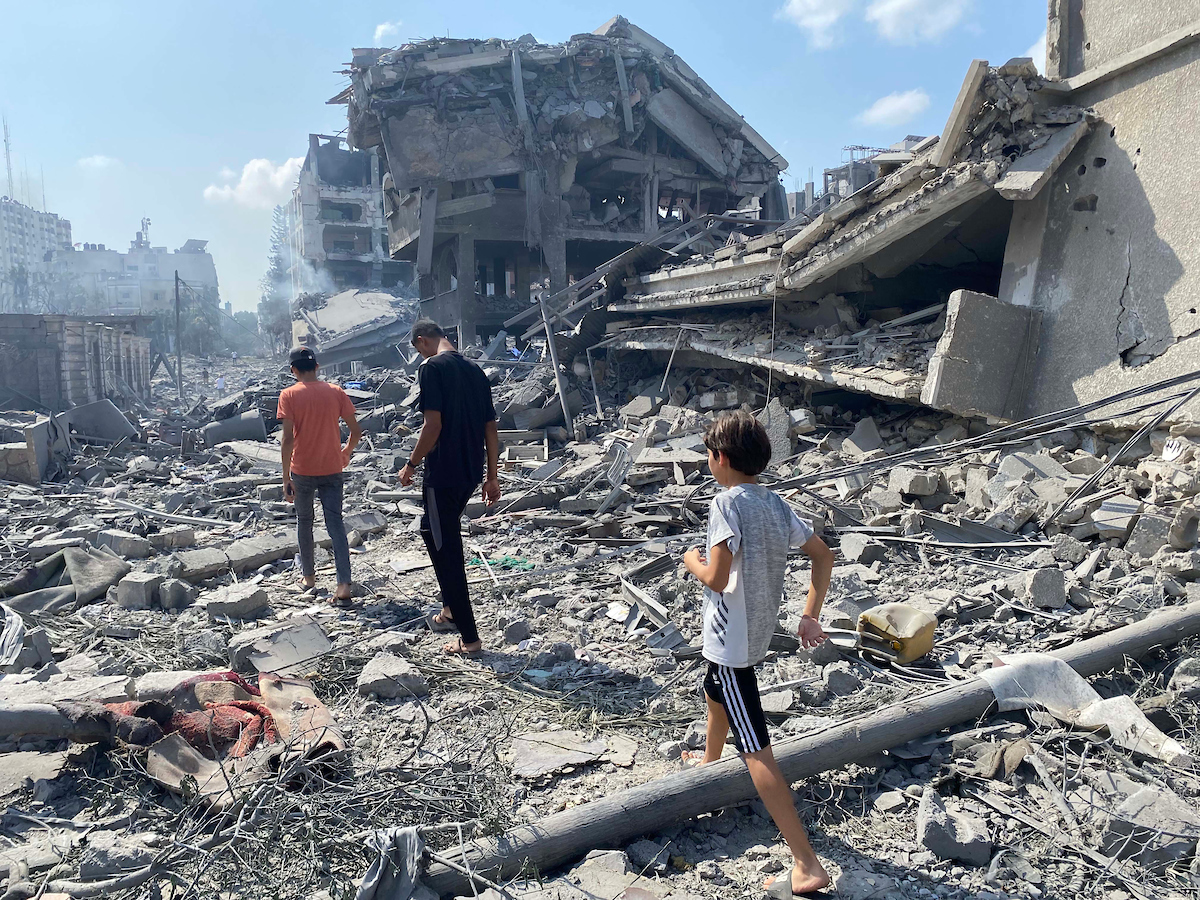
El-Remal aera in Gaza City on 9 October 2023

Fabrizio Carboni, the International Committee of the Red Cross's (ICRC) director for the Middle East, said that "Without electricity, hospitals [in Gaza] risk turning into morgues."

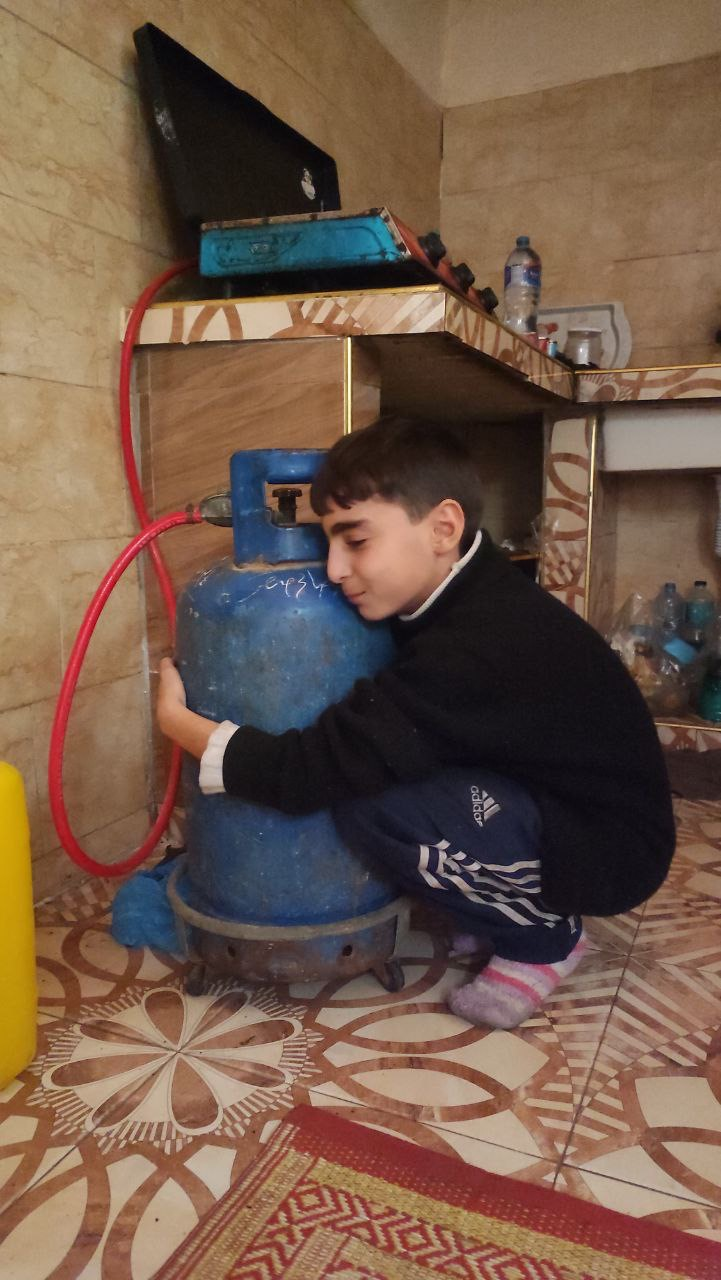
Palestinian child clutching a precious gas canister during the Israeli blockade of the Gaza Strip, December 8, 2024

According to Human Rights Watch, "Israel's Minister of Energy and Infrastructure has made it clear the recent Hamas attacks are 'why we decided to stop the flow of water, electricity and fuel'. These tactics are war crimes, as is using starvation as a weapon of war." A spokesperson for Gisha, an Israeli human rights group, said there was no "justification for this kind of targeting of civilians".

British politician and Leader of the Labour Party, Keir Starmer, announced his support for Israel's "right" to totally cut power and water supplies to the Gaza Strip in an interview with LBC, prompting the Labour Muslim Network to describe his comments as endorsing "collective punishment" and demand an apology from him. The Mayor of London Sadiq Khan urged Israel to exercise restraint, arguing that a blockade of the Gaza Strip could lead to suffering of Palestinian civilians.

On 13 October, the Norwegian Ministry of Foreign Affairs condemned the Israeli siege and the displacement of the population of the Gaza Strip.

Agnès Callamard, secretary of Amnesty International said that Israeli authorities should immediately stop the increased restrictions, including cutting off electricity, water, and food. She stated that the blackout would have a severe effect on access to clean water, communications and internet access, and public health.

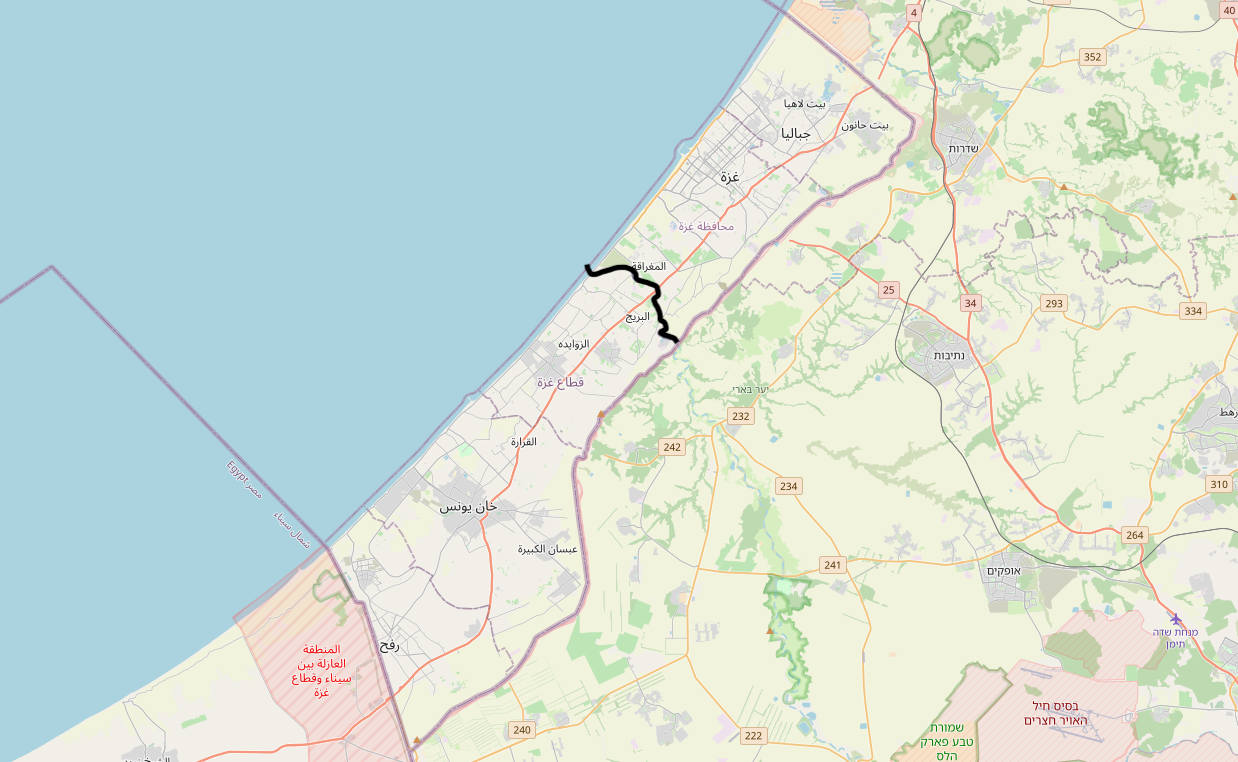
The line in black represents the IDF's boundary at Wadi Gaza for evacuation of the northern Gaza Strip

On 18 October, the United States vetoed a UN Security Council resolution, sponsored by Brazil and supported by 12 of the 15 Council members, calling for "humanitarian pauses" to deliver aid to Gazan civilians. The US Ambassador to the UN Linda Thomas-Greenfield explained that the US was working on a diplomatic resolution to the humanitarian crisis, and the resolution failed to recognize Israel's right to self-defense.

On 21 October, the Israeli army dropped leaflets in Gaza with the message: "Urgent warning! To the residents of Gaza: your presence to the North of Wadi Gaza is putting your lives at risk. Anyone who chooses not to evacuate from the North of the Gaza Strip to the South of the Gaza Strip may be identified as a partner in a terrorist organization."

On 22 October, Cindy McCain warned that "these people are going to starve to death unless [the World Food Programme] can get in."

On 18 December, Human Rights Watch accused Israel of "using starvation of civilians as a method of warfare in the occupied Gaza Strip".

On 7 January 2024, the UNRWA deputy director reported severe hunger and an almost collapsed healthcare system.

On 9 January 2024, British Foreign Secretary David Cameron admitted he is "worried" that Israel has "taken action that might be in breach of international law", saying he wanted Israel to restore water supplies to Gaza.

On 17 March 2025, in response to questions asked to him in the House of Commons, British Foreign Secretary David Lammy twice stated that Israel's blockade of humanitarian supplies into Gaza was a "breach" of international law. He said that "Israel, quite rightly, must defend its own security, but we find the lack of aid – and it has now been 15 days since aid got into Gaza – unacceptable, hugely alarming and very worrying." However, Prime Minister Keir Starmer's office publicly rejected Lammy's statement that Israel had breached international law by blocking Gaza. Starmer's office stated that it was up to the Foreign Office to decide whether Lammy should apologise for his criticism of Israel. On 18 March 2025, Lammy told Bloomberg it was a "matter for the court" to decide if Israel had breached international law.

In May 2025, Dutch Foreign Minister Caspar Veldkamp argued that Israel's blockade of the Gaza Strip was a violation of international law and therefore of the EU–Israel Association Agreement.

In May 2025, Australian Prime Minister Anthony Albanese echoed criticisms from other Western nations in demanding Israel allow the supply of humanitarian aid into the Gaza Strip, condemning Israel's actions as "completely unacceptable" and an "outrage". However, he opposed sanctions against Israel over the blockade of Gaza, saying he was focusing on "peace and security for both Israelis and Palestinians" rather than "soundbites".

On 15 November 2026, Australia, Canada, Italy, and the United Kingdom issued a joint statement calling on Israel to permit immediate and unhindered humanitarian access to the entire Gaza Strip, noting that recent flooding had inflicted "further suffering" on Palestinians in the territory. Signed by the foreign ministers of the four countries, the statement warned that 150,000 tents and other essential supplies were being held at the border and prevented from entering Gaza, where the population was said to be in dire need of shelter and humanitarian assistance. It marked the latest in a series of international appeals over the humanitarian conditions in the besieged enclave.

=== Responses from civilian organisations ===
In response to the intensified blockade, a number of civilian organisations stepped up their efforts to reach Gaza with humanitarian deliveries of essential goods. These resulted in, for example, plans for a Freedom Flotilla in 2024, loading of a Freedom Flotilla in May 2025, the Soumoud Convoy of June 2025, and sailings in June 2025, July 2025, and a planned sailing in late August to September 2025.

== See also ==
- List of blockades
  - Blockade of Nagorno-Karabakh
- Outline of the Gaza war
- Israeli war crimes
- War crimes in the Gaza war
- Palestinian genocide accusation
- Palestinian rocket attacks on Israel
- Gaza Strip evacuations
- Effects of the Israel–Hamas war
- Violent incidents in reaction to the Gaza war
- Israeli blockade of aid delivery to the Gaza Strip
