= Golan Vach =

Israel Defense Forces reservist

Golan Vach (Hebrew: גולן ואך; born c. 1974) is a colonel in the Israel Defense Forces (IDF) reserves. He previously served as the commander of the National Rescue Unit within the Home Front Command.

He is the son of Shalom and Liat Vach, and is the 3rd of ten brothers and a sister. His family has gained national recognition in Israel as a musical ensemble and for its military service.

== Early life and education ==
Vach grew up in Kiryat Arba, an illegal Israeli settlement in the West Bank, and is a graduate of the Eli pre-military academy (mechina).

== Military career ==
Vach began his military service in the Battalion 890 of the Paratroopers Brigade and later served in the Maglan unit before moving to the Givati Brigade.

=== Home Front ===
In 2009, Vach transferred to the Home Front Command and then in 2018 was appointed commander of the Home Front Command's National Search and Rescue Unit. This unit works both within Israel and internationally. As part of the international relief operations, Vach participated in rescues in Haiti (2010), Albania (2019), Philippines, Brazil, Mexico, Albania, Honduras, U.S.A (2021), and Turkey.

In Turkey, his team found and saved 19 survivors, and gave medical aid to the wounded. Turkish President Recep Tayyip Erdogan presented Vach with a certificate of appreciation for his team's work.

=== Decapitated baby hoax ===
In the aftermath of the Hamas attack, Vach claimed to have found 8 babies burned in one house, and a dead mother and baby elsewhere in Kibbutz Be'eri. "The baby was decapitated. I carried the baby with my own hands." he said.

A later analysis concluded that not only were there no babies in the house mentioned by Vach, but "the 12 people inside were almost certainly killed by Israeli forces when they stormed the building". In a video interview, Vach said that the building's destruction was due to Israeli tank fire during efforts to retake the area.

According to Israel's National Insurance Institute, kibbutz leaders and the police, on October 7 one baby was killed in Kibbutz Be'eri, 10-month-old Mila Cohen. She was killed with her father, Ohad.

=== Tunnel shaft collapse ===
In Sept 2024, Vach entered a tunnel in Gaza without completing standard procedures to check for booby traps or collapse risk, after which the tunnel collapsed, injuring and trapping him inside. Vach was criticised by his commander for going against orders and causing an unnecessary diversion of forces.

=== Building demolition ===
Vach headed a small unit called "Pladot" that was "dedicated to destroying buildings in Gaza". A reservist assigned to guard the unit said that its goal was to "flatten Gaza as much and as quickly as possible". Reportedly its goal was to destroy 60 buildings a day.

Amnesty International UK has argued that extensive destruction of homes and civilian property should be investigated as "the war crime of wanton destruction" and, where punitive, as the war crime of collective punishment.

Human Rights Watch called the destruction of civilian buildings and massive, deliberate forced displacement of Palestinian civilians in Gaza, "war crimes" and "crimes against humanity".HRW alleged that "Israel has blatantly violated its obligation to ensure Palestinians can return home, razing virtually everything in large areas."

The IDF described "Pladot" as an authorised reservist unit that received appropriate training, and rejected assertions of improper conduct.
