= Death of Yazan al-Kafarneh =

Palestinian boy died due to starvation (2014–2024)

- Part of Gaza Strip famine, Effect of the Gaza war on children in the Gaza Strip, and the Gaza genocide
- Location in the Gaza Strip.
- Date: March 4, 2024
- Location: Mohammed Yousef El-Najar Hospital, Rafah, Gaza Strip, Palestine; 31°17′49.1″N 34°14′37.5″E
- Type: Starvation
- Deaths: Yazan al-Kafarneh

Yazan al-Kafarneh (Arabic: يزن الكفارنة) (4 June 2014 – 4 March 2024) was a Palestinian boy with cerebral palsy who died from malnourishment on 4 March 2024, aged 9. He died during the ongoing Gaza Strip famine caused by the tightening of the Israeli blockade of the Gaza Strip during the Gaza war. He became a face for the children in Gaza and the Gaza Strip famine, with his image used by politicians and international organizations.

== Background ==
Malnutrition screening conducted in the northern Gaza Strip in January 2024 by UNICEF and the World Food Programme found that nearly 16% of all children under the age of two were acutely malnourished with similar testing, finding at least 5% of children in Rafah under the age of two experiencing malnutrition.

The crisis derives from Israeli airstrikes that have destroyed food infrastructure, and a widespread scarcity of essential supplies, combined with the ongoing blockade of the Gaza Strip and limited humanitarian aid. On 3 January 2024, Arif Husain, the chief economist at the World Food Programme, stated 80 percent of all people in the world experiencing famine or catastrophic hunger were in the Gaza Strip, stating, "In my life, I’ve never seen anything like this in terms of severity".

The same month, head of Israel's COGAT Colonel Moshe Tetro, who facilitates humanitarian aid into the Gaza Strip, claimed that there was no food shortage in Gaza.

== Death ==
Al-Kafarneh lived with his family in Beit Hanoun in northern Gaza before the war, with his family able to provide him enough food, water and medical care. Likely due to his condition al-Kafarneh would have had to have a specialized diet made up of soft and highly nutritional foods. However, multiple Israeli airstrikes caused the family to relocate several times and in an effort to find him better care, food and water, the family relocated to Rab'a School in Tel al-Sultan, Rafah in southern Gaza which had been deemed a safe area by the Israeli government. By 25 February, al-Kafarneh began to suffer from pneumonia, which aggravated him even further after weeks of hunger and his already fragile condition.

In images taken before al-Kafarneh died, he is described by New York Times reporters as having flesh that is shrunken and shriveled, that is pallid and stretched tight over every curve of bone and sagging with every hollow. One of the more widely shared photos of him online shows his right hand with an intravenous line.

== Aftermath ==
His image and death were utilized in a speech at the UN General Assembly in New York, by the Palestine representative to the UN, Riyad Mansour. Mansour stated that his death was due to Israel using starvation as a weapon of war, and called for the end of Israeli impunity. Photos of al-Kafarneh were reposted online by activists, journalists, and Palestinian supporters, to bring a human face to the humanitarian disaster in Gaza due to the ongoing offensive, issues with humanitarian aid delivery, and potential famine. An Al Jazeera video report highlighting the lack of food and plight of civilians in the Gaza Strip was made in front of al-Kafarneh's body as it was being prepared for burial, showing his emaciated body.

== See also ==
- Effect of the Gaza war on children in the Gaza Strip
- Israeli invasion of the Gaza Strip
- List of civilians killed in the Gaza war
