= Children in the Gaza war =

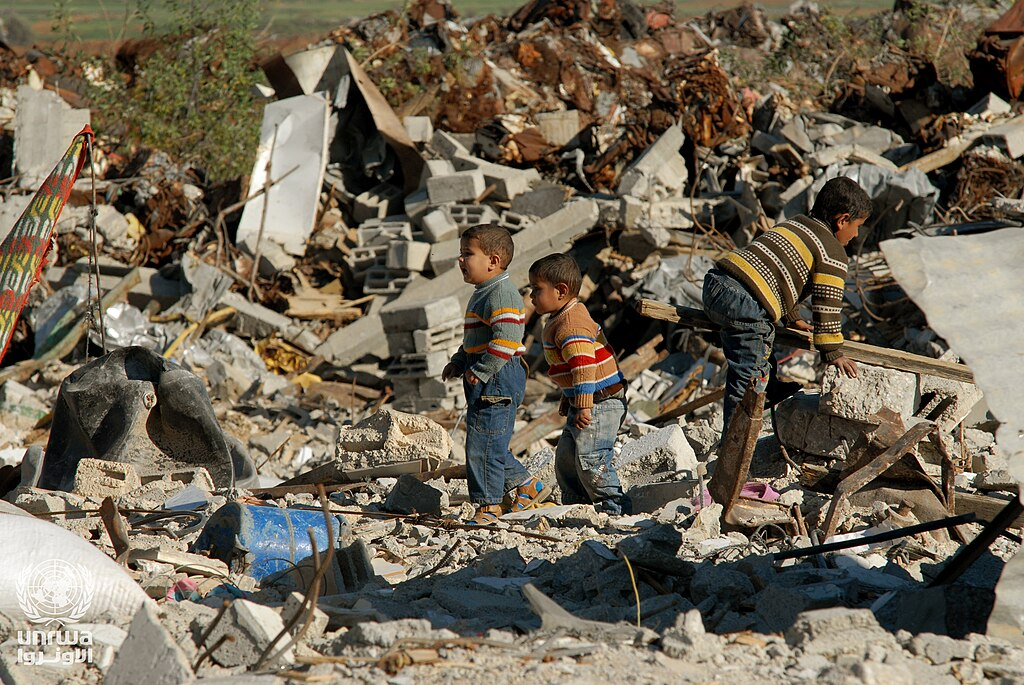
Boys salvaging a destroyed building in the Gaza Strip

The Gaza war has disproportionately affected children, who make up about 40% of the population of the Gaza Strip. In November 2023, UN Secretary General António Guterres warned that "Gaza is becoming a graveyard for children. Hundreds of girls and boys are reportedly being killed or injured every day." As the war continued, the toll increased steadily, reaching at least 19,424 children by 3 September 2025.

Within the first month of the war, about 700,000 children in Gaza had been displaced. A May 2025 estimate reports that 1.9 million people, roughly 90% of Gaza's population, had been displaced by the war. Many had been uprooted repeatedly, in some cases more than ten times. The collapse of essential services created a humanitarian crisis, as families struggled to access food, clean water, and medical care. The ongoing crisis also impacted routine vaccinations, leaving thousands of children at risk of preventable disease. Additional hardships included inadequate shelter, a lack of adequate winter clothing, and the continuing psychological toll on children's mental health.

As a result of the war, many children had sustained amputations and other permanent disabilities, as well as psychological trauma. Thousands more suffered from dehydration, malnutrition, diseases linked to the lack of clean water such as gastroenteritis, and respiratory diseases.

In January 2024, two months into the war, the UNICEF deputy director described the situation of children in Gaza as the "most horrific" he had ever seen. (Note: He also called for immediate and "unconditional" release of Israeli children who were being held hostage by Hamas.) By August 2025, humanitarian conditions for children were reported to have reached an unprecedented level of severity, affecting every aspect of their rights and well-being. Nutritional conditions had become catastrophic, with an officially confirmed famine in three of Gaza's five governorates. A June 2026 UN Independent International Commission of Inquiry report found that Israel had killed approximately 20,000 children and injured 44,000 more since 7 October 2023. The report documented cases of children being killed by single, precise gunshots from snipers and drones, which it said indicated deliberate targeting rather than incidental harm.

== Health ==
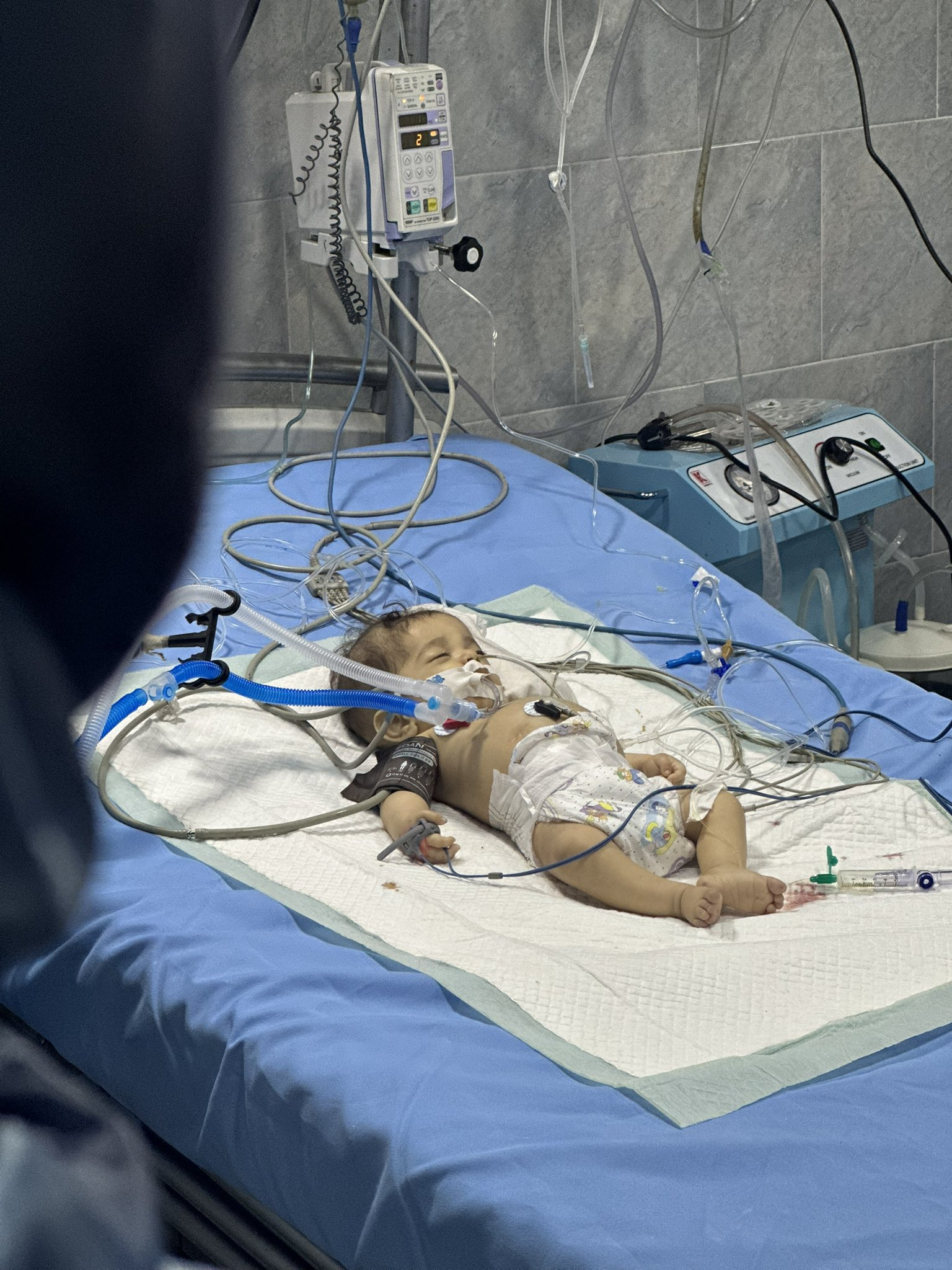
A dead infant in Kamal Adwan Hospital on 28 June 2024 as a result of the humanitarian crisis in the Gaza Strip

Since 2007, Israel had implemented a strict land and sea blockade that had prevented items such as food and medicine from moving into the Gaza Strip, with the health system struggling before the war.

Ahmed al-Fara, the head of pediatrics at Nasser Medical Complex in Khan Younis, stated due to the lack of water during the war, he was witnessing the "most serious epidemic of gastroenteritis" among children he had ever seen. Catherine M. Russell, the executive director of UNICEF, toured Gaza on 15 November 2023, stating many children were lacking medical care. On 28 December, UNOCHA stated 50 percent of all children in the Gaza Strip were experiencing dehydration, malnutrition, respiratory and skin diseases. Cases of diarrhea in children under the age of five has increased by about 2,000% since 7 October per a UNICEF report. A UN spokesperson indicated that between 7 October 2023 and 4 January 2024, disease had skyrocketed in Gaza with more than 400,000 cases of infectious disease reported, which included about 180,000 people with upper respiratory infections and more than 136,000 cases of diarrhea, with half of cases presenting in children under 5. By July 2024, WHO stated more than 150,000 people had contracted skin infections, with malnourished children most susceptible due to their weakened immune systems.

According to statistics published by the World Health Organization (WHO), in January 2024, only about 30% of medics were still working due to the widespread effects of the war in Gaza. An amputee patient in a southern Gazan hospital stated that medication comes through the crossing into Gaza every four days but its not a guarantee that patients receive medication, and that in some hospitals patients have to pay for medication and food up front. Other medications such as insulin pens were temporarily placed on restricted items to be allowed into Gaza by the Israeli government officials. This caused the UN Humanitarian Coordinator for Palestine Jamie McGoldrick to state; "On the goods that are being prohibited, it’s a full range...Some of it is medical material such as basic drugs and material for treating not just trauma but for chronic illnesses...One example would be most recently the pens that are used for insulin for children" A Canadian doctor returning from two weeks in Gaza stated he had seen the "sickest child I had ever seen in my medical career". By July 2024, children in tent camps were infected with a number of skin diseases.

By the summer of 2025, Gaza's healthcare system had been sharply curtailed, with most hospitals in Gaza damaged or out of service. This makes it impossible to access even basic care and leads to growing obstacles for those in need of specialized treatment and support. The humanitarian consequences fall especially hard on children.

=== Medical facilities ===
==== Children's hospitals ====
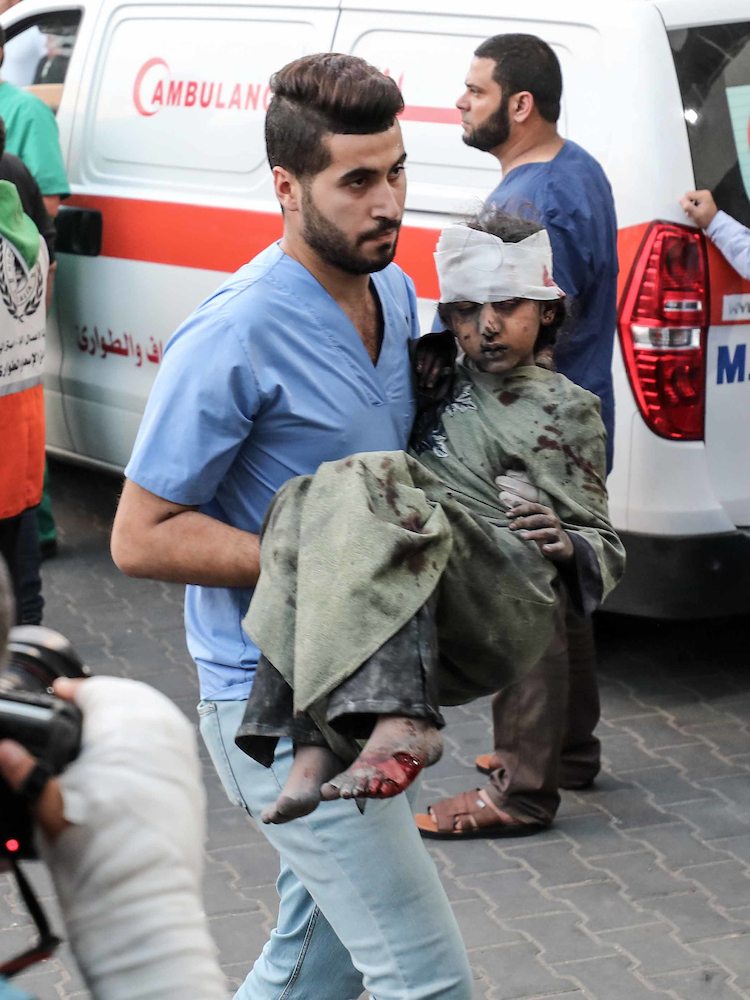
Wounded child at Al-Shifa Hospital

In November 2023, reports indicated that medical care at Al-Rantisi and Al-Nasr children's hospitals has nearly come to a halt. Only a small generator provided power to the intensive care and neonatal intensive care units. Al-Rantisi Hospital faced intense attacks and hostilities. Furthermore, Al-Nasr Children's Hospital has once again suffered damage, including vital equipment. Another children's hospital in the northern region has ceased operations due to both damage and a shortage of fuel. Additionally, a specialized maternity hospital is in dire need of fuel to continue functioning.

On 15 February 2024, the United Nations reported that Israel had destroyed its clinic for visually impaired children, stating the "centre was available to all visually impaired children across the Gaza Strip and provided braille machines, canes, [and] visual aids."

==== Medical evacuations ====
Due to the destruction of Gaza's healthcare system, medical evacuation is necessary for access to specialized treatment unavailable in the Gaza Strip.

Evacuation planning for children with medical concerns such as cancer out of Gaza and to continue treatment began in mid-October 2023, with discussions and negotiations among the United States, Egypt, Israel and Palestinian health officials along with World Health Organization and St. Jude Children's Research Hospital representatives. Many families and officials involved in Gaza have described a difficult process with damage to transportation avenues and communication networks causing many to miss crossing or pick-up times, while others were not allowed to evacuate with their children. After repeated airstrike damage and lack of fuel at least two dozen premature babies were evacuated out of Gaza hospitals to Egypt to continue the specialized care they needed. Those that were evacuated were suffering from life-threatening conditions including dehydration, vomiting, hypothermia and sepsis due to the lack of medicine and fuel. Injured children were also evacuated with Turkey offering treatment and resources to at least two groups of children that were receiving intensive care treatment.

It was reported in early March 2024, that about 300 children had been evacuated to Qatar with the majority being wounded and needing treatment but some being parents or a supporter. Many described the separation from family members as excruciating, with some children being unable to talk to their parents, living with relatives in Gaza or having to monitor and parent younger siblings while their parents care for their injured siblings. On 16 August 2025, the U.S. State Department announced that it had suspended the issuance of visitor visas to people from the Gaza Strip, including children who require urgent medical care.

In January–April 2024, medical evacuations for children from Gaza averaged about 296 per month; by late 2024 the rate had fallen to under one per day. In October 2024, UNICEF said children were dying not only from the violence itself but also because survivors were often unable to leave Gaza for urgent, life-saving treatment. By July/September 2025, an estimated 2,500-4,500 of critically wounded children are waiting for permits to be evacuated for care.

=== Preventive and systemic care ===
==== Hygiene ====
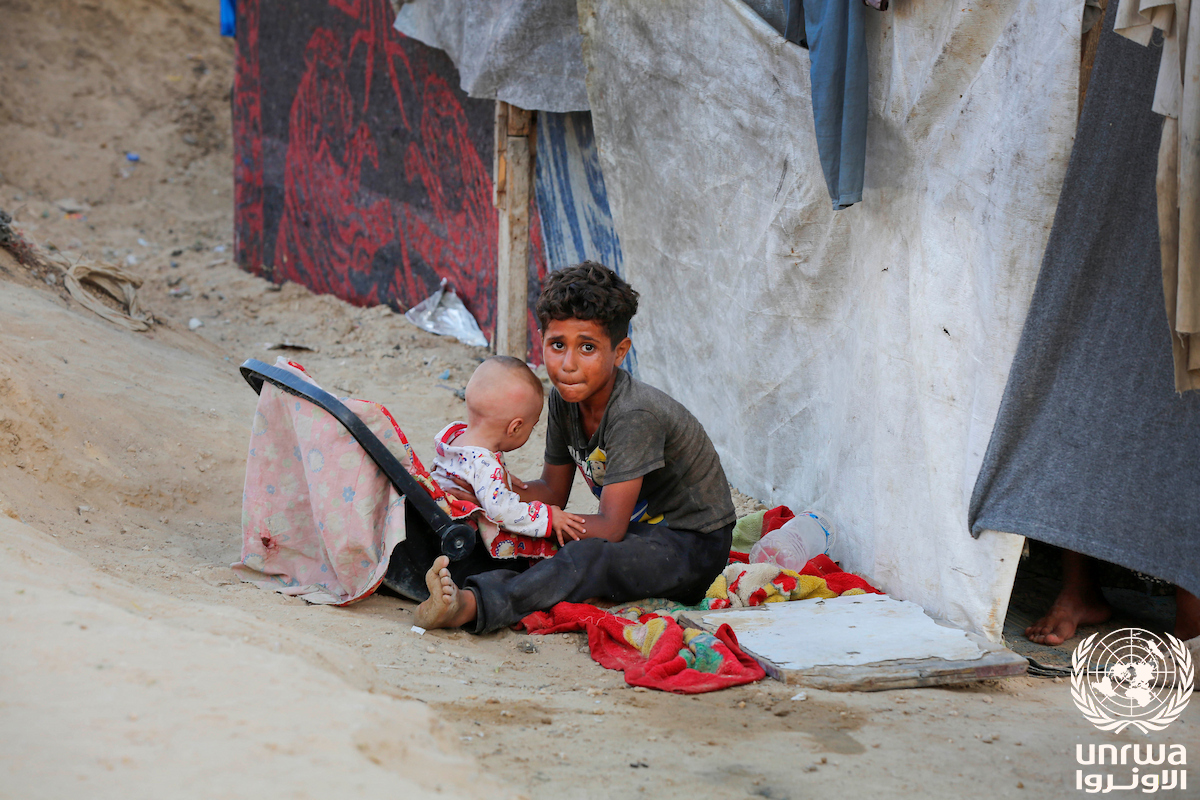
A displaced child takes care of his brother in Deir el-Balah, Gaza Strip

In December 2023, ActionAid reported that there was little water for washing and some shelters only had one shower for every 700 individuals and one toilet for every 150. UNICEF announced on 7 March 2024 that they were distributing wellbeing kits to adolescent girls in Rafah, who reported being unable to "shower more than once a week. The shelters are crowded with people, and there is little water. It is difficult to maintain personal hygiene".

It was reported in late February 2024 that there were 690,000 menstruating women and children in Gaza, that have limited access to menstrual hygiene supplies. Some women and children have utilized period blocking pills, but those can be hard to find and many are unable to take them for medical reasons. One girl sheltering in a UNRWA school in Maghazi told reporters that she had begun washing used pads to reuse them, while another indicated that due to the stress of the war she had been having her period more often, about twice a month. A mom of five daughters told reporters that they were all utilizing Pampers diapers for their periods, and had to cut the diapers in half due to costs while others have utilized rags, old clothes, towels or corners of tents causing chafing and skin infections.

In June 2024, children suffered from intestinal infections and hepatitis C or A, due to the destruction of Gaza's water supply and sanitation systems.

==== Vaccinations ====
Shortly after the 7 October attacks and Israel's retaliation in October 2023, preventable diseases were expected to rise due to disruption in vaccination abilities. Childhood vaccinations had already dropped due to the COVID-19 pandemic, and experts cautioned about the spread of infectious diseases such as COVID-19 and measles that could be contained primarily with vaccinations.

In mid-December 2023, the Gaza Health Ministry stated it had run out of vaccinations for children, which would have catastrophic repercussions. An UNOCHA representative stated the organization was having difficulty delivering childhood vaccines. On 1 January 2024 it was reported by the Palestinian Health Ministry that Israel had allowed and would facilitate the transport of vaccines into Gaza through the Rafa crossing. It was cautioned that the disbursement of the vaccines would be difficult due to displacement and destruction of infrastructure. On 29 January 2024, UNICEF reported that 16,000 children were at risk of missing routine vaccinations.

In July 2024, a polio outbreak occurred in Gaza, marking the first appearance of the virus there in 25 years, and it remains ongoing. In order to contain the polio virus outbreak and limit further transmission, the WHO held two vaccination drives, one in September 2024 that reached 90% of children under 10, and one in February 2025.

=== Survival and physical conditions ===
==== Malnutrition ====
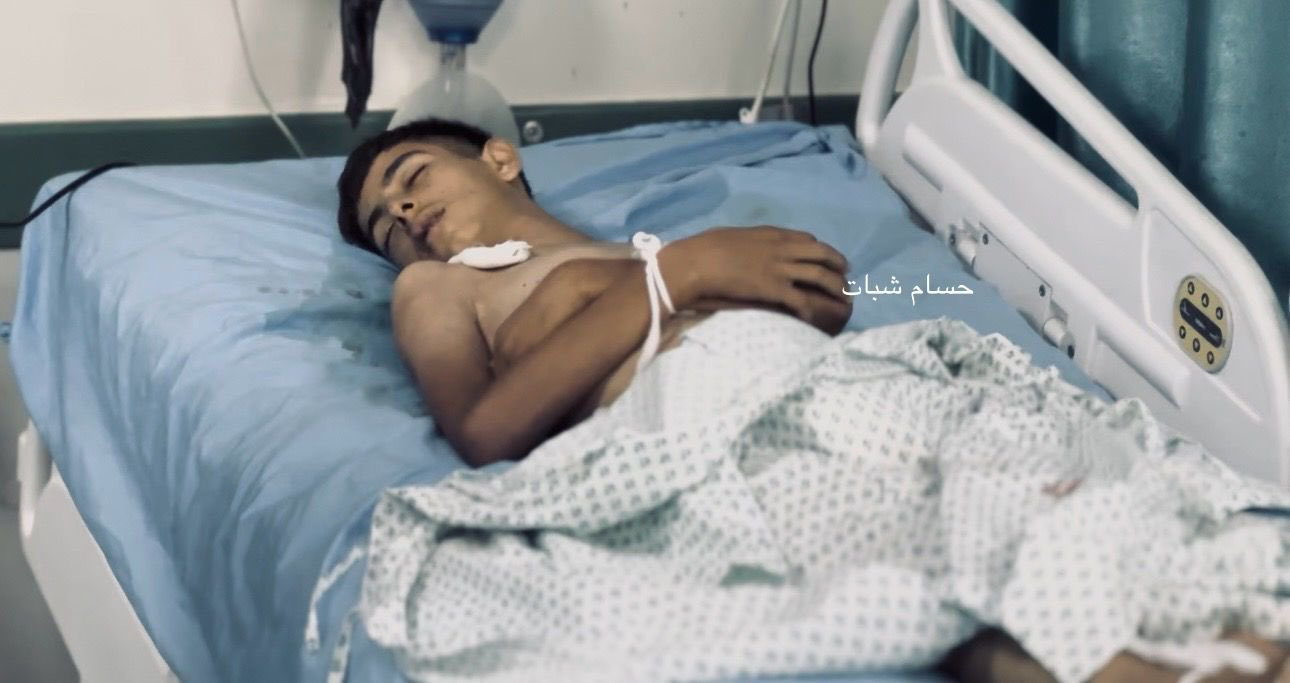
Mohammed Assaf, a 17-year-old boy, who reportedly died due to complications from malnutrition.

On 3 January 2024, UNICEF chief Catherine M. Russell stated many children in Gaza were facing severe acute malnutrition. On 5 January, UNICEF found 90 percent of children under the age of two were eating two or fewer food groups a day. On 3 February, Hani Mahmoud, an Al Jazeera journalist in Rafah, stated, "We’re seeing children roaming around in Rafah looking for scraps of food." In early January 2024 UNICEF reported that around 90% of children in Gaza under 2 were subjected to severe food poverty, which had jumped from 80% about two weeks prior.

Price jumps have also been seen by those attempting to purchase food, with a caregiver purchasing through a procurement company infant formula which had cost him $1,680 before the war, but paying $2,160 in February 2024. The United Nations stated on 10 February 2024 that 10 percent of children under five-years-old were suffering from acute malnourishment. One mother reported feeding her newborn using date paste. On 19 February 2024, UNICEF found that nearly 16 percent of children in northern Gaza under two-years-old were "acutely malnourished", with 3 percent suffering from severe wasting. In early March 2024 UNICEF reported that over 90% of children aged 6–23 months and pregnant or breastfeeding women face severe food poverty with access to two or fewer food groups a day.

Child malnutrition is varied throughout Gaza, with northern Gaza experiencing worse food shortages then southern Gaza leading to a child malnutrition rate three times higher according to the WHO. In March 2024, 10 children died at Kamal Adwan Hospital from dehydration and malnutrition, leading UNICEF to state, "Now, the child deaths we feared are here and are likely to rapidly increase unless the war ends and obstacles to humanitarian relief are immediately resolved". Doctors at Kamal Adwan stated all staff could give malnourished and dehydrated newborns was saline or sugar solution, with one pediatrician stating, "My message is an appeal to the entire world to intervene and save all the children". A severely malnourished 10-year-old boy named Yazan al-Kafarneh died from starvation. On 6 March 2024, WHO secretary-general Tedros Adhanom Ghebreyesus warned of "children who survived bombardment but may not survive a famine".

The Palestinian Red Crescent found parents were going without food in order to feed "their hungry children amidst food insecurity and shortage of available food". Doctors at the Kamal Adwan Hospital stated malnourished infants in the ICU had become the "new normal". One doctor at Kamal Adwan stated, "Babies reach critical and severe degrees of dehydration and acidemia disorders and ultimately death." In June 2024, the director of the Kamal Adwan Hospital stated more than 200 children were at risk due to malnutrition. A clinical nutritionist stated that due to contaminated water and a lack of food security, 90 percent of children were experiencing diarrhea, hepatitis, and other diseases. Mothers were so malnourished they were unable to produce breastmilk to feed their newborn babies. Children continued to die from malnutrition in August 2024.

In October 2024, Save the Children reported that of the approximately 3000 under five-years-old children they had screened, about 20 percent had moderate acute malnutrition and four percent had severe acute malnutrition.

From 2 March until 26 May 2025, Israel completely blocked all supplies from entering Gaza, making it the longest complete closure in the history of the blockade. Since 26 May 2025, the United States- and Israeli-backed Gaza Humanitarian Foundation has facilitated limited and largely ineffective aid distribution. In June 2025, UNICEF-supported clinics in Gaza reported a sharp rise in child malnutrition: 16,736 children were treated between January and May 2025, including 5,119 in May alone. This was nearly 50% more than in April and over double the February figure. Of these, 636 had severe acute malnutrition, the deadliest form, which has risen by about 146% since February. UNICEF warns that without large-scale aid deliveries, acute malnutrition could reach its highest level since the conflict began, despite wasting being virtually absent 20 months earlier.

==== Hypothermia ====
On 16 January 2024, doctors reported children weakened by starvation were dying from hypothermia. An ActionAid coordinator stated on 27 January 2024 that children without winter coats were suffering from the cold and rainfall of the winter months, with new commercial products prevented from being brought in. An Al Jazeera correspondent reported he had witnessed children sleeping in cold, mud-filled tents. One father stated in an interview on 2 February 2024, "It’s so freezing. Even my children can’t. One to two blankets aren’t enough at all. I have a newborn baby. I fear he will be ill every other day." Children in Rafah were dressed in remaining PPE equipment from the COVID-19 pandemic in order to keep warm. In Deir al-Balah, children burned books to keep warm.

=== Birth and pregnancy ===
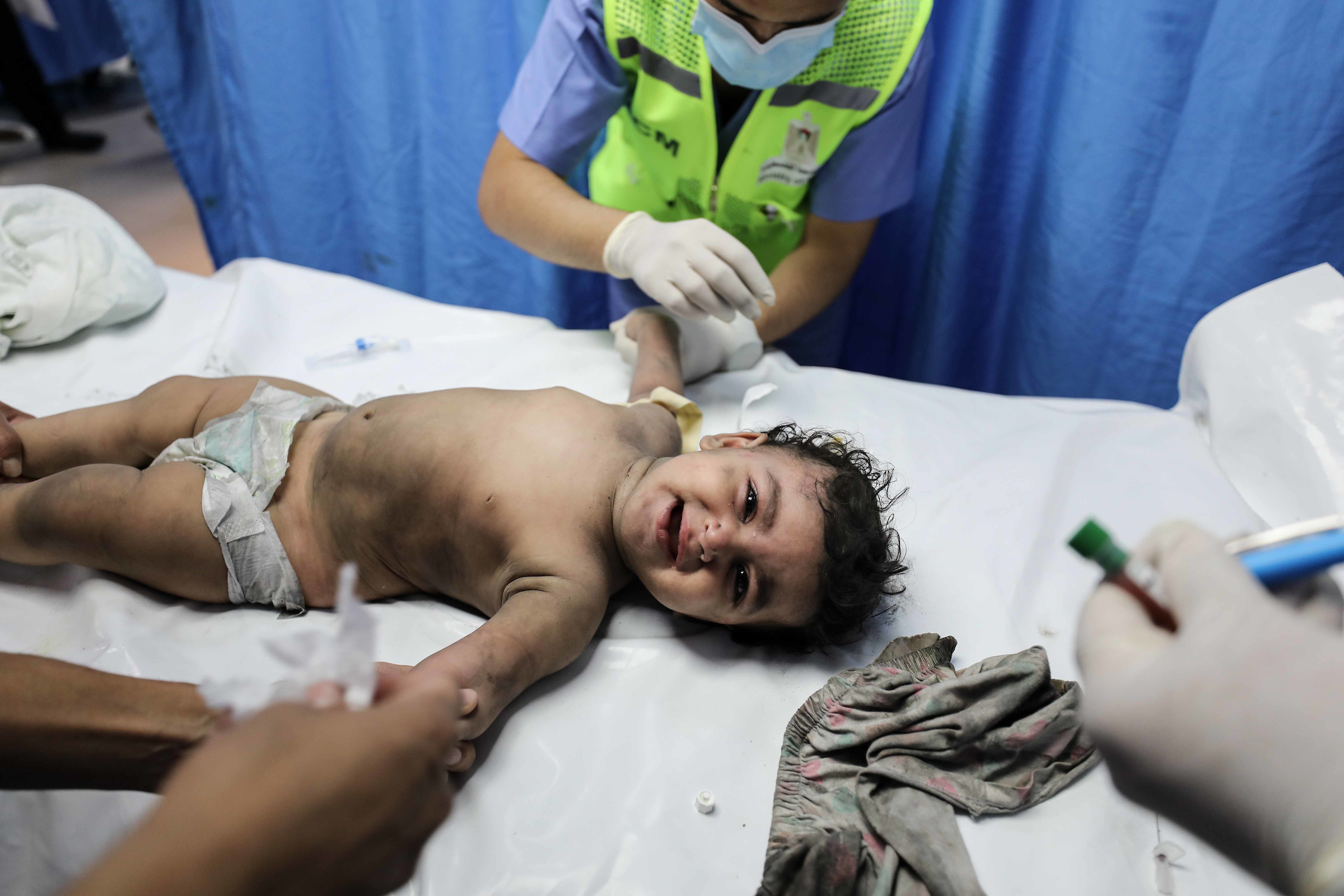
Wounded infant at Al-Shifa Hospital, 11 October 2023

An estimated 150 babies were born in Gaza per day since the start of the conflict. A pediatric doctor at the Emirati Hospital in Rafah, stated the number of premature babies born in Gaza had risen sharply. Newborn babies receiving specialized care in Israel and the West Bank while their mothers were trapped in Gaza. Oxfam stated newborn babies were dying from preventable diseases such as infection, hypothermia, diarrhea, and dehydration. By mid-December, parents were struggling to feed newborn babies, as mothers had insufficient nutrition to breastfeed. Newborn babies born during the conflict died in airstrikes, though some were rescued from the rubble. A UNOCHA representative stated she had met a woman forced to give birth in the street, and that the baby had died. One woman reported being unable to bathe her newborns more than ten days after their birth, due to the lack of clean water. Mothers reported extreme difficulty locating or affording milk and diapers for their newborns.

In December 2023, an Israeli shell struck the largest fertility clinic in Gaza; the explosion knocked the lids off five liquid nitrogen tanks, causing temperature within the tanks to rise and destroying more than 4,000 embryos and 1,000 specimens of unfertilized eggs and sperm. According to Bahaeldeen Ghalayini, the obstetrician and gynaecologist who founded the clinic, the corner of the building was hit by a single shell, destroying the ground floor embryology lab; he does not know whether the strike was intentional or not.

On 18 January 2024, Natalia Kanem, the executive director of the UN Population Fund, spoke at the World Economic Forum at Davos, stating the situation was the "worst nightmare" the UNPF representative had ever witnessed, as there were 180 women giving birth daily, sometimes on the streets of Gaza, as the territory's health system collapsed. On 17 January, Care International reported a 300 percent increase in the rate of miscarriage in Gaza since the start of Israel's bombing. UNICEF reported on 19 January that 20,000 babies had been born in the Gaza Strip since 7 October. UNICEF described each birth as a baby being "delivered into hell", and stated "humanity cannot allow this warped version of normal to persist any longer." The UN Women's agency reported that since the start of the conflict, two mothers in Gaza had been killed every hour, every day. WHO reported an increase in stress-induced stillbirths.

Doctors Without Borders stated that women were giving birth in plastic tents, and that those undergoing C-sections were being released within hours. It also reported that women were being turned away from hospitals due to overcrowding, with some forced to birth in public restrooms. Doctors at Kamal Adwan Hospital performed an emergency c-section on a deceased pregnant woman in February 2024, after which they performed a fetal cardiac resuscitation; however, the baby did not survive. In April 2024 doctors in Rafah performed a similar emergency c-section after an IDF bombardment targeted a housing block in Rafah, the baby survived in critical condition before dying after 5 days. Her mother, father and 3-year-old sister had all been killed in the bombing. In July 2024, yet another baby was delivered by surgeons after the mother was killed by an airstrike.

The Women's Centre for Legal Aid and Counselling reported women were suffering from birth complications and a lack of both postpartum care and newborn vaccines. The United Nations Population Fund stated that newborn babies were dying because mothers were unable to access prenatal or postnatal care. According to a UNICEF State of Palestine Humanitarian Situation report, from early March 2024 at least 5,500 pregnant women do not have access to pre or post natal check ups due to the continued airstrike and lack of safe shelter. Doctors at the Al-Helal Al Emirati Hospital reported "chaos and suffering" due to the large influx of displaced people arriving to deliver their babies.

==== Premature babies ====
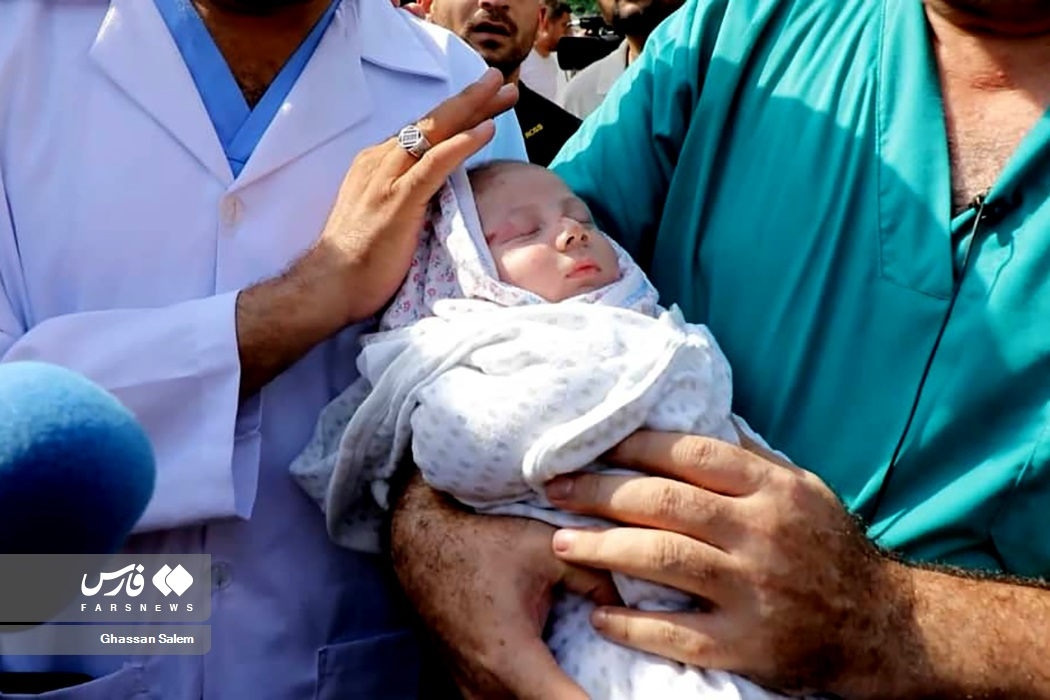
Injured newborn, 17 October 2023

In late October, Gaza's premature babies faced a critical situation as Medical Aid for Palestinians and UNICEF warned that 130 infants were at risk of death due to a hospital fuel shortage caused by Israel's siege. The lack of fuel led to power outages, endangering premature babies in neonatal intensive care units (NICUs). Despite assurances from the IDF to assist in evacuations, the Gaza Health Ministry reported a lack of evacuation mechanisms, resulting in the deaths of several infants.

The situation escalated in mid-November when Israel launched a raid on al-Shifa Hospital. Evacuations eventually occurred, facilitated by the Palestinian Red Crescent, World Health Organization, and UNOCHA, with 31 premature babies moved to southern Gaza, with most then to Egypt. Not all infants were accompanied by their parents, and two died at al-Shifa before the evacuation.

The distress extended to Al-Nasr Children's Hospital, bombed by the IDF in early November, where medical workers had to leave babies in incubators during evacuation. Video footage later revealed the aftermath, with five premature babies found dead in their incubators. The IDF initially denied responsibility, though an Israel official was heard providing assurances to evacuate the hospital in a released audio. In mid-December, a military siege on Kamal Adwan Hospital worsened the situation, as IDF soldiers reportedly prevented staff from supporting 12 babies in intensive care.

In April 2024, a World Health Organization spokeswoman stated, "Different doctors particularly in the maternity hospitals are reporting that they’re seeing a big rise in children born [with] low birth weight and just not surviving the neonatal period because they are born too small".

=== Trauma and aftermath ===
==== Wounded child, no surviving family ====
One of the most difficult aspects of the medical crisis in Gaza is “wounded child, no surviving family” (WCNSF). As of February 2025, the United Nations has reported roughly 25,000 such cases in Gaza; with no relatives left, clinicians become the children's sole caregivers and advocates, which complicates treatment decisions and long-term care planning. For children lacking any family support, the confusion and distress that accompany serious injuries are magnified many times over. Disrupted access to healthcare also triggers cascading physical, psychological, and social harms that demand responses beyond routine medical practice. Providers must address immediate needs as well as rehabilitation, mental-health support, and coordination with social services without family involvement. These challenges differ markedly from typical adult care.

==== Mental health ====
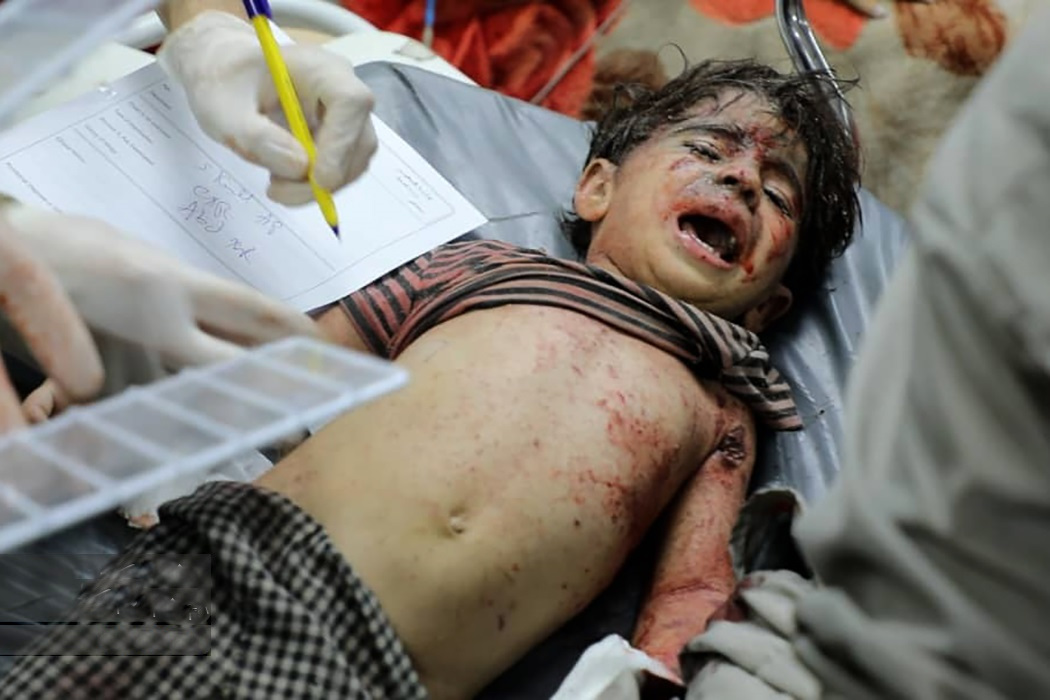
Injured child, 17 October 2023

Before the war, there were high numbers of children in Gaza that had documented high levels of emotional distress and mental illness, with a study in 2011 found that among Palestinian children PTSD rates were between 23 and 70%, while a UNICEF study in 2021 found one in three children in Gaza needed care for conflict-related trauma.

After 16 days of sustained air strikes and explosions, children had developed severe trauma, with symptoms including convulsion, aggression, bed-wetting, and nervousness. 90% of children in pediatric hospitals in Gaza exhibited or reported symptoms of anxiety, the majority exhibited post-traumatic stress symptoms, and 82% reported fears of imminent death.

In November 2023, Save the Children expressed concern for the physical and emotional wellbeing of children throughout the region, including in the West Bank and Israel, warning that the mental health of children in Gaza has been driven past its limits. The organization's director of humanitarian policy said that the war had "starved and robbed [children in Gaza] any sense of safety and security". On 2 February 2024, UNICEF reported that one million children, or nearly every child in Gaza, was in need of mental health support. Evacuated children were found to be suffering from psychological trauma.

Mohammed Brighieth, a professor at Birzeit University, warned of the psychological impact of the war on children, stating, "The children of Gaza live somewhere between the process of psychological trauma and certain death." A 5-year-old whose entire immediate family was killed by an Israeli airstrike while evacuating to Rafah, was described as being starkly different by his grandmother, he was reportedly in shock, does not talk much, and was scared of any sounds. Parents in Rafah purchased songbirds for their children to help them cope with the constant sounds of bombing. On 21 February 2024, the chair of the Norwegian Refugee Council warned that all children in Gaza would likely suffer from trauma due to the war.

On 23 February 2024, the director of Doctors Without Borders reported, "Psychological injuries have led children as young as five to tell us that they would prefer to die." Save the Children found, "Children in Gaza are going through a period of mass-scale shock and grief. This war and the physical and mental scars it is leaving on children is further eroding their resilience." In July 2024, Julia Wendt, the emergency child protection coordinator with the International Rescue Committee, stated children in Gaza were suffering from nightmares and bedwetting due to the mental toll of the war. In September 2024, children's hair was turning prematurely grey due to their high levels of stress. In October 2024, Dr. Bahzad Al-Akhras, a psychiatrist in Al-Mawasi, described the psychological impacts of the war on children, stating they were "learning that nothing is secure, nothing is stable. They have learnt to continuously escape, not to trust others, not to trust life itself."

Caitlin Procter, a researcher at the Centre on Conflict, Development and Peacebuilding in Geneva, highlighted the severe psychological impact on children in Gaza. Some have witnessed the brutal killings of their parents by soldiers, while others have seen their homes destroyed by bombings. Many children endure extreme conditions of cold, hunger, and loneliness, spending days wandering the streets alone. The overwhelming situation has left even mental health experts in Gaza feeling helpless and in need of support. In Rafah, located in the southern part of the Palestinian territory, Karyn Beattie from the NGO Save the Children described the dire situation where displaced Gazan children, some as young as pre-teens, are forced to work as breadwinners, selling aid items to afford basic necessities.

By October 2025, large numbers of children were seen on the streets during the day, many showing unusually aggressive behavior. The psychological damage suffered by Gaza's younger generation is described as beyond measure.

== Military detention ==
Annually, the Israeli military arrests approximately 500 to 700 Palestinian children, all under the age of 18. As reported by Addameer, a Palestinian NGO, about 200 of these children remain incarcerated in Israeli prisons. Following the commencement of Israel's aggressive actions in Gaza on 7 October, there has been a noticeable surge in detentions - with over 450 children being taken into custody at various points, as stated by the Palestinian Commission for Detainees and Ex-Detainees Affairs. Since the year 2000, an estimated 13,000 children have been subject to arbitrary detention, interrogation, trial in military courts, and imprisonment.

Many Palestinian children are detained in nighttime operations, with some being placed in administrative detention without a fair trial or formal charges. According to Lawyers for Palestinian Human Rights, there are numerous significant human rights issues associated with these procedures.

In May 2024, the Israeli military publicly identified several Palestinian children, alleging that they had been acting as Hamas informants, leading the United Nations Special Rapporteur on the occupied Palestinian territories to state the Israeli army often forces detained Palestinian children to become informants.

In April 2025, it was reported that Walid Ahmad was the first Palestinian child to die in Israeli prisons. Ahmad was arrested six months prior to his death and kept at the Megiddo Prison after being accused of throwing stones at soldiers in the occupied West Bank.

== Casualties ==
=== Fatalities ===
Breakdown of deaths by age and gender (analysis by professors Michael Spagat and Daniel Silverman), November 2023
1. Men and boys over 14 (35.3%)
2. Women and girls over 14 (24.1%)
3. Children under 14 (33.8%)
4. Elderly, above 60 (6.80%)

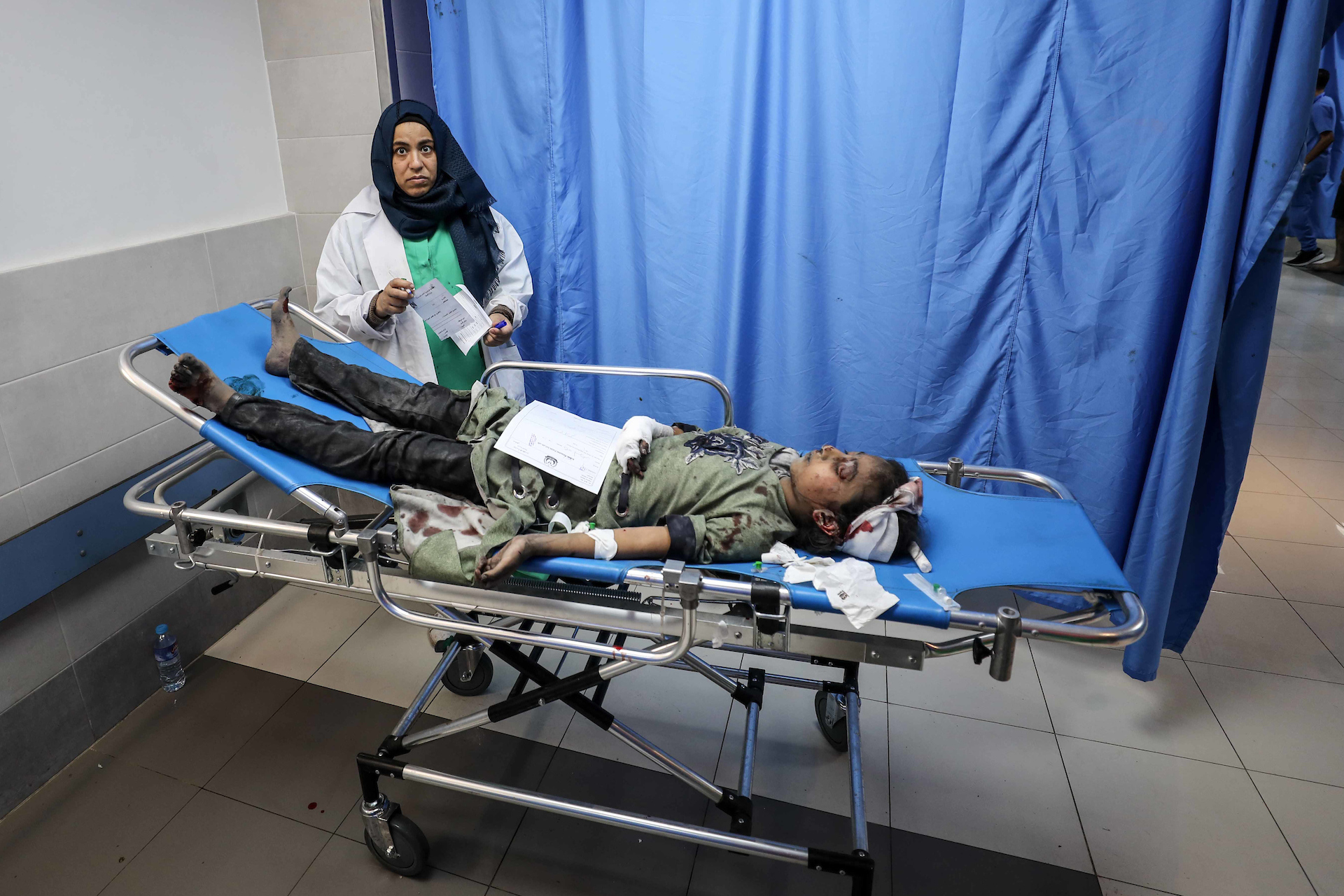
Wounded child at al-Shifa Hospital, October 2023

From the beginning of the Gaza war, reports emerged of children being killed and maimed. Children were also killed in Israeli airstrikes, including in areas designated as “safe zones” by the IDF. The numbers rose rapidly. During the first week of the war in October 2023, at least 447 children were killed. By 3 December 2023, the number had reached an estimated 6,150 children, rising to about an estimated 10,000 by mid-January 2024, with thousands more believed to be buried under rubble. Defense for Children International put the figure at 12,100 children in early February, and mid-April 2024 estimates cited around 14,500 fatalities. In May 2024, the United Nations adjusted its estimate down from 14,500 children to 7,797 identified child deaths, and by December 2024, the overall figure was again reported at roughly 14,500. By 3 September 2025, at least 19,424 children had been reported killed.

In March 2024, the United Nations stated that more children had died in Gaza between October 2023 and February 2024 than the sum of all global conflicts from 2019 to 2022. Catherine M. Russell, the head of UNICEF, stated, "We haven’t seen that rate of death among children in almost any other conflict in the world". In late September 2024, Oxfam and Action on Armed Violence reported that the number of children killed in Gaza over the past year was the highest recorded in a single year for any conflict worldwide in the last 20 years.

Warning of the joint threats of starvation and disease, a UNICEF spokesperson stated in February 2024: "The Gaza Strip is poised to witness an explosion in preventable child deaths which would compound the already unbearable level of child deaths in Gaza".

In August 2024, an Israeli airstrike killed Joumana Arafa and her four-day-old twins. In May 2025, nine of Alaa al-Najjar's ten children, a paediatric specialist working at Nasser Hospital, were killed by an Israeli airstrike at their home in Khan Yunis, the eldest of the children aged 13 and the youngest aged six months. Her husband and tenth child were also injured from the attack, and her husband Hamdi later succumbed to his injuries.

==== Sniper killings ====
In February 2024, an American doctor returning from the Gaza Strip wrote an op-ed in the Los Angeles Times stating that she had witnessed children being deliberately targeted by Israeli snipers, writing, "On one occasion, a handful of children, all about ages 5 to 8, were carried to the emergency room by their parents. All had single sniper shots to the head... None of these children survived." A Canadian doctor returning from a week in Gaza stated she had seen crimes against humanity, including small children "dying of hunger, bombs, sniper shots." Israeli drone footage released in March 2024 showed Israeli snipers killing an unarmed boy in Jabalia. In April 2024, doctors said they were seeing "a steady stream of children, elderly people and others who were clearly not combatants with single bullet wounds to the head or chest."

Dr. Mark Perlmutter, an American doctor working in Gaza, stated Israeli snipers were targeting children, stating, "No toddler gets shot twice by mistake by the 'world's best sniper.' And they're dead-center shots." In August 2024, an American doctor returning from Gaza stated, "We had kids shot in the chest and shot in the head – in other words, clearly deliberate, clearly targeted". In October 2024, The New York Times reported compiled testimony from 44 doctors, nurses, and paramedics who treated multiple cases of preteen children with gunshot wounds to the head or chest in Gaza. Inquiries sent to the IDF regarding the experiences of these health care workers received a statement from a spokesperson that did not directly confirm whether investigations into the shootings of preteen children had been conducted or if any soldiers faced disciplinary action for firing at them. In response to claims alleging that the report was based on "fabricated evidence", The New York Times issued a statement defending the integrity of the piece, emphasizing that it had undergone rigorous editing and verification, including consultations with experts and the use of supporting photographs, which they deemed "too horrific for publication."

De Volkskrant interviewed 17 doctors who had volunteered during the Gaza war. Fifteen of them reported seeing children with "a single gunshot wound to the head and/or chest." These doctors reported seeing 114 children injured this way. In response, former Commander of the Royal Netherlands Army Mart de Kruif told the paper, "If you're seeing a high number of gunshot wounds to the chest area and the head, that’s not collateral damage – that’s deliberate targeting." In one documented case, a girl was reportedly shot and killed while in her mother's arms.

In June 2026, a 94-page report by the UN Independent International Commission of Inquiry on the Occupied Palestinian Territory concluded there were reasonable grounds to determine that Israeli forces directly targeted children in Gaza using snipers and quadcopter drones.

==== Killing of Hind Rajab ====
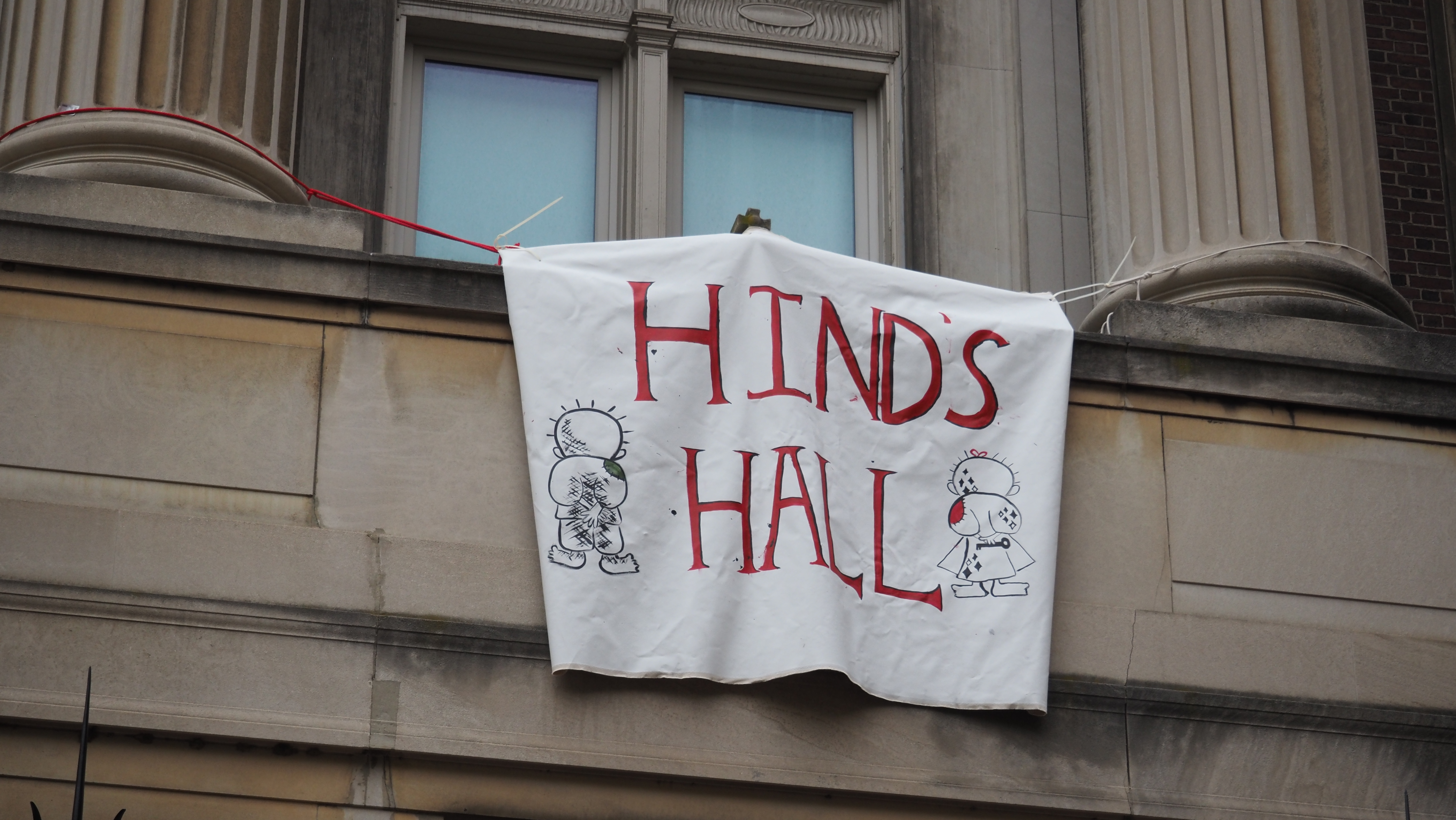
A banner hangs from Columbia's Hamilton Hall after protesters occupied the building, renaming it "Hind's Hall", 30 April 2024

In February 2024, the Palestinian Red Crescent reported that a paramedic unit had gone missing attempting to rescue six-year-old Hind Rajab. In released audio of the emergency call, Rajab is heard telling the paramedics, "I'm so scared. Please come," with gunfire in the background immediately after the family's car had been hit by an Israeli tank. On 3 February, the media director of the Palestinian Red Crescent stated only Israeli forces knew what had happened to Hind. On 5 February, one week after the attack, Rajab's mother stated, "I have been appealing to the whole world, but no one moved a finger." Her grandfather stated, "We want to know her fate, whatever it was." On 8 February, ten days after Rajab went missing, the Palestinian Red Crescent stated, "We want answers, we want the truth, we need the painful silence to end." On 10 February 2024, Rajab was found dead along with the bodies of the two paramedics.

=== Injured ===
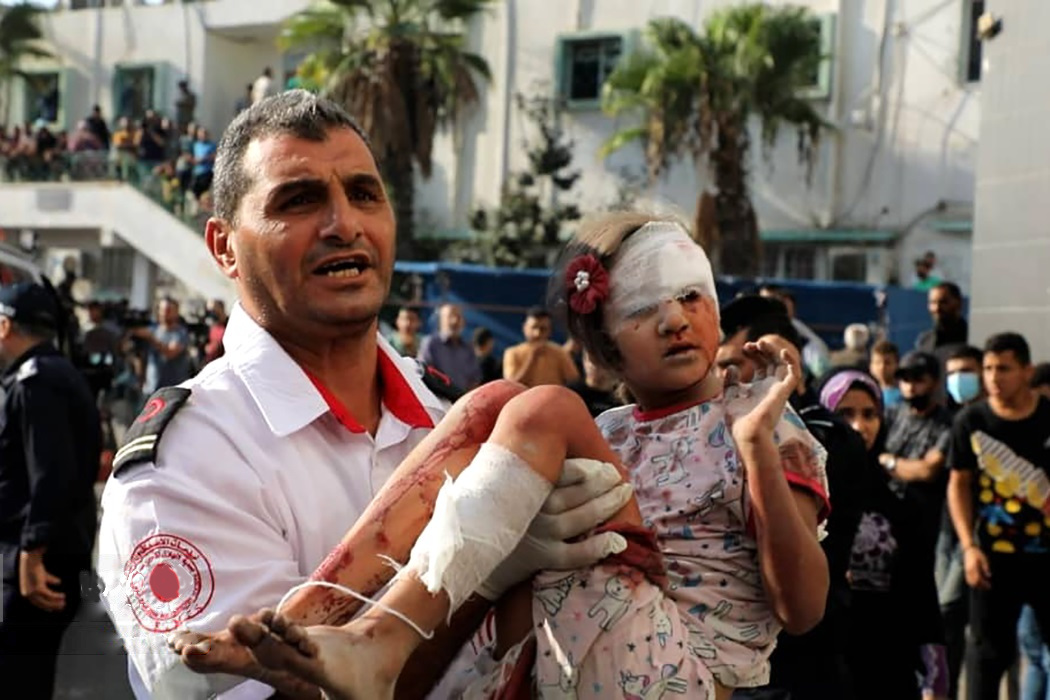
Medic carried wounded child

Doctors described children experiencing serious injuries. Doctors warned children who survived Israeli airstrikes were left with permanent disabilities and trauma. A report by Save the Children in January 2024 stated children were "enduring unspeakable horrors, including life-changing injuries, burns, disease, inadequate medical care, and losing their parents and other loved ones". A Doctors Without Borders doctor stated children were suffering from "terrible injuries, huge burns covering 50-70% of their body and massively broken limbs". Many of the surgeries performed on the children and other patients were performed without anesthesia due to severe shortages of medical supplies in Gaza, according to WHO. A doctor with Doctors Without Borders reflected that even after working in many war zones, he has seen more injured children in Gaza, stating; "It was really shocking for me because I have never seen babies. So many babies victim of trauma, of war, with war wounds".

A British doctor who spent time in Gaza through a medical charity and returned to the United Kingdom in December 2023 highlighted the concerns of poor hygiene and medical supply shortages that could cause wounds to become worse and make some un-survivable. This was echoed by UNICEF spokesperson James Elder, who recounted seeing a child who had been stuck in a vehicle at an Israeli military checkpoint for days due to delays, with a wound that had started to decompose. In June 2024, children with cancer and other illnesses were prevented from receiving chemotherapy outside of the Gaza Strip when Israel closed the Rafah border crossing during its Rafah offensive. In July 2024, American and Australian doctors stated that Israel was using bombs that spray shrapnel, which were causing "horrific injuries" to children. A one-week old baby was evacuated from Gaza after an Israeli bomb sent shrapnel into his eye. The same month, Israeli PM Netanyahu blocked the creation of a children's field hospital in Gaza.

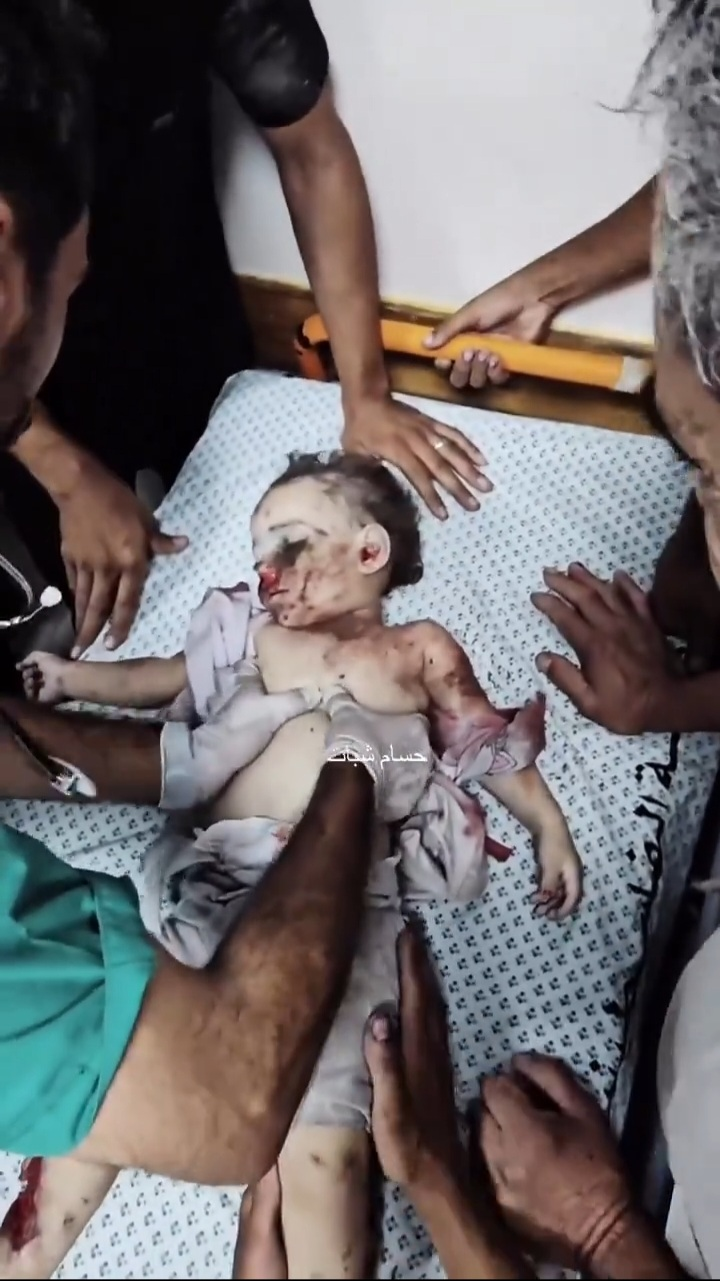
Rescue attempt for one-year-old girl in Gaza, 18 August 2024

In June 2024, Adam Hamawy, a former US army combat surgeon who worked in the European Hospital, stated, "But the level of civilian casualties that I experienced was beyond anything I'd seen before... Most of our patients were children under the age of 14".

==== Amputations ====
Save the Children reported 10 children a day in Gaza had lost their limbs, which would result in a lifetime of medical needs. A UNICEF spokesperson James Elder was quoted after returning from Gaza in mid-December 2023, that around 1,000 children had lost one or both legs since the 7 October attacks and the start of the war. According to the British doctor Ghassan Abu-Sittah, "This is the biggest cohort of pediatric amputees in history".

In mid-December 2023, a teenager's amputation performed without anesthesia on her families kitchen table by her uncle who is a doctor went viral on social media. She and a sibling had climbed to the top of the building to call their father who is overseas before the building was reportedly struck by IDF tank fire, and she was rushed inside to her uncle. In early-January 2024, an 11-year-old speaking to reporters about her injuries which included an amputated leg and with the other severely injured expressed her hope in getting an artificial limb, and lamented how her life has become "ugly and sad" after the injury. Other children's stumps after amputation had to be re-opened after infections had set in.

By June 2024, doctors in Gaza estimated as many as 3,000 children had lost limbs since October 2023. A WHO Emergency Medical Team coordinator also cautioned that due to lack of medical expertise and time, some of the amputations done were unnecessary or due to a time delay. The head of Humanity & Inclusion stated child amputees needed "immediate support" for prosthetics but that wasn't happening. In January 2025, UNICEF estimated that up to 4,000 children in Gaza had lost one or more limbs.

=== Orphaned ===
In November 2023, one month into the war, aid workers began using the term WCNSF (“Wounded Child No Surviving Family”) to describe children who had been injured and lost all family members. In late-August 2024, an estimated 19,000 children had lost one or both of their parents. UNICEF reported that extended families were taking on the responsibility of caring for orphaned children.

Many orphaned children described the pain of being unable to properly say goodbye to their parents and siblings, due to lack of funeral or memorial services, uncertainty of the future and delay at being told due to medical fragility. Older siblings and extended family also took on responsibility for caring for their younger siblings after being orphaned.

In early February 2024, UNICEF estimated that at least 17,000 children had been orphaned. Some children were left without even extended family remaining. In the Middle East, adoption by non-relatives is uncommon, as extended families traditionally assume responsibility for orphaned children. However, UNICEF reports that families already struggling to feed and shelter their own children are often unable or unwilling to take in additional dependents. By October 2024, the estimated number of orphans in Gaza had grown to 20,000.

In early September 2025, 2,596 children had lost both parents, according to UNICEF, citing figures from Gaza's health ministry. Furthermore, 53,724 children had lost one parent, 47,804 their father and 5,920 their mother. No figures are available on how many orphaned children also had been injured, but Gaza was reported to have the highest proportion of child amputations of any contemporary conflict. Medical workers said that while they can provide treatment for children's physical injuries, there is little lasting stability or support afterward. With most social institutions in collapse, only small community networks and aid groups remain to care for orphaned children or try to locate surviving relatives, efforts that are minimal compared with the overwhelming need. War Child is among the few humanitarian organisations contacted by emergency clinics about WCNSF cases. Its social workers search displacement camps for unaccompanied children and work to place them with adults willing to provide care. However, locating families willing to take in children is exceptionally difficult amid severe food shortages, and transporting a wounded child is very expensive. Amid worsening scarcity, many children, particularly boys, are banding together to survive, searching through rubbish for food or items to sell, and gathering in groups at food distribution sites, a perilous strategy born of extreme need.

==== Evacuations to Bethlehem ====
In March 2024, Israel brought 95 Palestinian orphans from Rafah to the SOS Children's orphanage in Bethlehem at the request of the German government. Israeli finance minister Bezalel Smotrich condemned the temporary measure, stating, "Any mercy to the cruel will end up being cruel to the merciful".

== Displacement ==
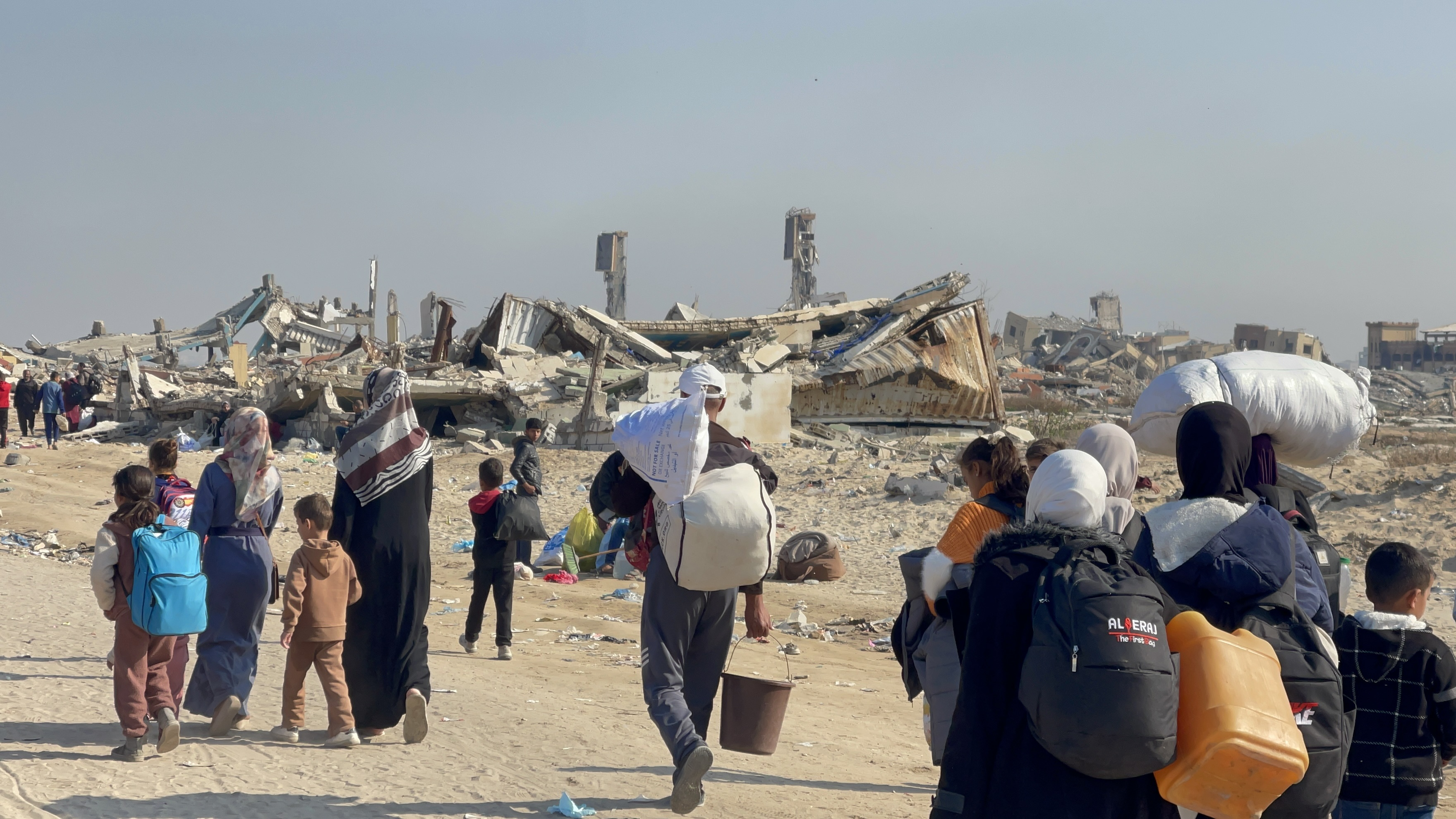
Displaced Palestinians in Gaza on 29 January 2025

On 13 November 2023, UNICEF reported that more than 1.5 million people in Gaza, including about 700,000 children, had been displaced. Nine days later, UNICEF reported "increasing numbers" of unaccompanied children had been identified evacuating from northern to southern Gaza by themselves. On 28 November, James Elder, a UNICEF spokesperson, stated wounded children were sheltering outdoors in car parks and gardens.

By December 2023, Save the Children reported that it is likely that about 893,000 children were internally displaced in Gaza, average of 12,000 children a day forced to flee their homes, with some having to evacuate multiple times. Of the about 1.9 million displaced people in southern Gaza children make up almost 50% of the evacuees. On 9 February, Catherine Russell stated, "UNICEF is urgently calling on the parties to refrain from military escalation in Rafah Governate in Gaza where over 600,000 children and their families have been displaced – many of them more than once."

As Israel began its Rafah offensive in early-May 2024, Save the Children stated, "Forcibly displacing people from Rafah while further disrupting the aid response will likely seal the fate of many children".

According to UNRWA, as of 10 March 2024, there are over 187,000 individuals who have recently been displaced in Gaza. A significant number of these individuals, including numerous children, have sought refuge in UNRWA schools. Unfortunately, some of the facilities providing shelter to these displaced families, such as schools, have also suffered damage.

In January 2025, it was estimated that over 90% of Gaza's population had been displaced. Also the United Nations reported in May 2025 that at least 1.9 million people, roughly 90 percent of Gaza's population, had been displaced by the war. Many families had been uprooted repeatedly, in some cases more than ten times, and new evacuation orders have continued to drive further displacement. Families in Gaza largely have no safe place to go. Displacement sites are packed and conditions are unsafe and undignified. Even where space exists, many lack tents or basic shelter materials, and tented areas themselves continue to come under bombardment.

=== Missing and identification ===
According to UNICEF, the standard system for identifying, documenting, tracing and reuniting children with relatives or siblings was barely functional in early December 2023. Additional difficulties arose from the intensity of the fighting and the rapidly changing conditions in Gaza, which hindered efforts to communicate with hospitals and medical staff. Four months into the conflict, the UN estimated that about 40% of all people in Gaza had lost identification cards and documents due to the war, making it more difficult to identify unaccompanied children and reunite them with their families. Humanitarian organizations also reported difficulties with orphaned children who were too young to know their own names. A UNICEF spokesman said: "The youngest ones very often cannot say their name and even the older ones are usually in shock so it can be extremely difficult to identify them".

Hospital and emergency workers in Gaza noted that parents and relatives of some children wrote on children's bodies, mostly on their legs and abdomens, so the children would be identifiable if found in the rubble or get lost. One employee stated: "Many of the children are missing, many get here with their skulls broken… and it’s impossible to identify them, only through that writing do they get identified."

In June 2024, Save the Children stated approximately 21,000 children were missing in Gaza, including 4,000 children believed to be buried under rubble. The bodies of some of these children remained unrecovered. In one case, a newborn was rescued from under rubble after surviving a bombing. In another, a girl was rescued after being buried for more than 40 hours.

== Education ==
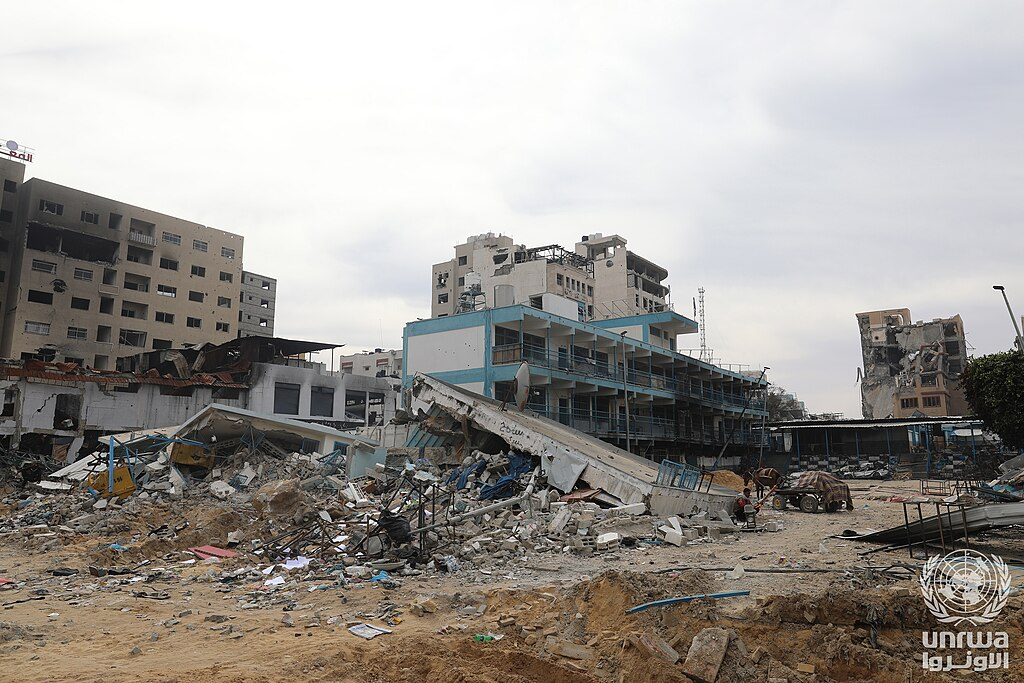
A destroyed UNRWA school in Zaytun in February 2024

Before the war, education in the Gaza Strip was seen as a point of pride and a high priority. More than 95% of the children aged between 6-12 were attending school, with the majority graduating from high school. In December 2023, Jonathan Crick, a spokesperson for UNICEF in Jerusalem stated that there is absolutely no form of education or schooling in the Gaza Strip, and the about 625,000 school age children in the Strip are being deprived of an education due to war. In January 2024, the United Nations reported that children in Gaza would lose at least one year of education due to the war. According to the Palestinian Ministry of Education, the war has caused the death of about 4,327 students and injured about 7, 819 others by January 2024. Additionally at least 200 teachers have been killed and more than 500 injured by December 2023 with the number increasing to 231 teachers and administrators killed and 756 wounded by January 2024.

Schools were closed at the start of the war, and underwent sustained bombing by the Israeli military, while others, such as the Israa University, were occupied and then destroyed by the Israeli military. By mid-December 2023 about 352 school buildings had been damaged, which is over 70% of the Strip's education infrastructure, with others being utilized to hold evacuated individuals and interiors utilized for fuel and survival. Some teachers attempted to continue lessons as they could, in courtyards and other areas not utilized by evacuated populations, with one teacher calling it an act of defiance and a small return to normal. On 22 February, however, a Save the Children representative stated, "Even if the war were to end tomorrow, education can not just resume. More than half of Gaza's schools have either been destroyed or are too damaged to even function". In August 2024, UNRWA launched a "back to learning programme" in Khan Younis.

In August 2024, the Education Cluster, Save the Children, and UNICEF stated that students and children in Gaza had lost a year of education and warned that the "majority of them may never return to school again". Some students enrolled in online classes or learned in tent classrooms.

As of January 2025, children in Gaza had been without formal schooling for over a year. While some informal classes reportedly take place in displacement camps, parents say their children are falling behind academically, forgetting basic literacy skills, or losing crucial years of education altogether.

== Involvement of children in military operations ==
=== Use as human shields by Israel ===
Israel has used Palestinian children as human shields in Gaza in violation of Geneva conventions. Human rights groups have said that "even if Hamas were using human shields", Israel must still abide by international law, especially the principle of proportionality.

In May 2023, before the beginning of the Gaza war, Defence for Children International – Palestine (DCIP) had already documented that five children had been used as human shields by the Israeli army since the beginning of that year, with two of the victims being 2-year-old twins.

According to a 2024 Haaretz investigation based on many Israeli soldiers' testimony, Palestinian teenagers, adults, and occasionally elderly men are regularly used as human shields to explore the tunnel network in the Gaza Strip. These shawashim are dressed up, apart from sandshoes, to look like Israeli soldiers, handcuffed, blindfolded and, with a video camera attached to their bodies, sent into houses where Hamas combatants are suspected to hide, or into tunnels that might be booby-trapped. The practice is said to be widely known to IDF field commanders. Palestinians were used when neither sniffer dogs nor drones were available. An October 2024 investigation by CNN found that while the scale and scope of the practice was unknown, testimony from civilians and an Israeli soldier showed Israel's use of Palestinians as human shields was widespread across the Gaza Strip. In November 2024, an investigation by The Washington Post further corroborated these investigations, with witnesses, victims, and an Israeli soldier stating civilians were being used as human shields to prevent harm to Israeli soldiers.

An investigation by the DCIP detailed that the Israeli army is "systematically" detaining and torturing children. Israel used several children as human shields in the Al-Tuffah area of Gaza City on 27 December 2023. On that occasion, 50 Palestinians were detained, including children. Two brothers, aged 12 and 13, told investigators that soldiers forced them to strip off, tied their hands and forced them to walk in front of Israeli tanks along with other Palestinians. The younger brother also reported being slapped, kicked and beaten.

In November 2024, Defence for Children International reported on three separate incidents, during 15–20 October 2024, of families with young children being used as human shields to protect the Israel Defense Forces in attacks at the Jabalia refugee camp and Indonesia Hospital.

=== By Hamas ===
The IDF has accused Hamas of using child soldiers and of positioning children on the front lines. Israeli officials claim Hamas and Islamic Jihad had for years run summer camps in the Gaza Strip where children underwent military training. According to the Coordinator of Government Activities in the Territories, a unit of the Israeli Ministry of Defense, "a senior Hamas militant" said Hamas used children to transport explosives. Israel also claims Hamas sent over one hundred children and women to a compound the IDF was targeting to act as human shield in November 2023, that they had found entrances to multiple Hamas tunnels near and under children's beds during the war, and that children are used by Hamas to scout and observe the IDF forces, reporting activity, locations, and extent of the forces.

Neve Gordon, professor of international law and human rights and co-author of the 2020 book Human Shields: A History of People in the Line of Fire, has stated that Israeli military and government claims of Hamas using Palestinian civilians as human shields "should be understood as a pre-emptive legal defence against accusations that Israel is committing war crimes and crimes against humanity in Gaza". Janina Dill, a laws of war professor at University of Oxford, stated, "Even if Hamas uses civilians as human shields, those civilians are entitled to full protection under international law unless they directly participate in the fighting". Scholars in international law have cautioned that accusing Hamas of using human shields requires proving intent to shield a military target with civilians.

== Deliberate targeting ==
A 2026 United Nations report found reasonable grounds to conclude that Palestinian children had been deliberately targeted by Israeli security forces during the conflict. The report documented cases of children being killed by single, precise gunshots by snipers and drones, frequently in the head or upper torso, suggesting a deliberate intention to target them rather than incidental harm.

Doctors who had undertaken medical missions in Gaza told the Commission that it appeared Israeli Defense Force (IDF) were engaging in a "game of target practice", with different parts of children's bodies reportedly being targeted on different days.

The report also documented systematic attacks on child-essential infrastructure that had contributed to preventable child deaths and long-term disabilities. The Commission further examined dehumanising rhetoric by political leaders, soldiers and public figures, which it said contributed to an environment in which violence against Palestinian children was more readily accepted.

== Reactions ==
Meirav Ben-Ari, an Israeli Knesset member, stated, "The children in Gaza brought it upon themselves." Far-right Israeli Nation Security Minister Itamar Ben-Gvir called for the death of any child or woman who got too close to the border during a debate with Israeli military chief Herzi Halevi, claiming that "We cannot have women and children getting close to the border... anyone who gets near must get a bullet [in the head],". Ben-Gvir claimed that the open-fire policy he was advocating for was based on the perceived use of women and children by Hamas to target Israel.

During an interview on Israeli television, a former Mossad official Rami Igra who had headed the agencies "Captive and Missing Division", claimed that there were no uninvolved civilians in Gaza. He raised claims that "anyone over four is a Hamas supporter" and that only those under four could be considered children, while anyone above that age could starve.

Rabbi Eliyahu Mali, the head of a yeshiva in Jaffa, stated that the ongoing war was a mitzvah war and that not a soul shall live in Gaza as they will all grow up to become Hamas. When asked about babies and children in context with his comments, he stated; "Babies too?...The same thing. You can't be clever with the Torah. Today he's a baby, tomorrow he's a fighter. There are no questions here. Today's terrorists were 8-year-old children in the previous operation. So you can't To be satisfied here. That's why the Gaza law is different here."

In Gaza, a father whose one-year-old child was killed in an Israeli bombing stated, "This is a crime in which everyone participated. The US veto participated in this crime as did those Arabs and Muslims who failed to support us". The grandfather of children killed by an Israeli airstrike stated, "What wrong did those innocent children do? Were they posing any danger to Israel? Were they carrying arms?"

Marc Owen Jones wrote in a 2025 research paper, "As Israel's killing of thousands of Palestinian children and babies became harder to hide, high-profile Israeli accounts and media outlets claimed that Palestinians were fabricating casualty numbers and staging the killing of babies. The so-called 'Pallywood' narrative – a derogatory term suggesting that Palestinians stage scenes of suffering for propaganda purposes – has been a recurring theme in disinformation campaigns against Gaza."

=== By children in Gaza ===
In November 2023, a group of children outside al-Shifa Hospital held a press conference asking the world for an end to the war. A small group of children in Rafah held their own protest in advance of a planned Rafah offensive in February 2024, holding signs in English that read "We refuse to die" and "Save us from this genocide". Children in Rafah again held their own protest against the Gaza Strip famine on 6 March, holding a banner reading "Stop our daily death".

In February 2024, a boy wounded in an Israeli attack stated, "I don’t know why they attacked me. They are picking fights against the children of Palestine. Why?" In July 2024, a 10th grade student in Ramallah said hearing explosions on the news "just twisted something inside of me, like I felt those emotions coming out. I was scared. I was terrified, actually. It could be me next."

=== International and domestic organizations ===
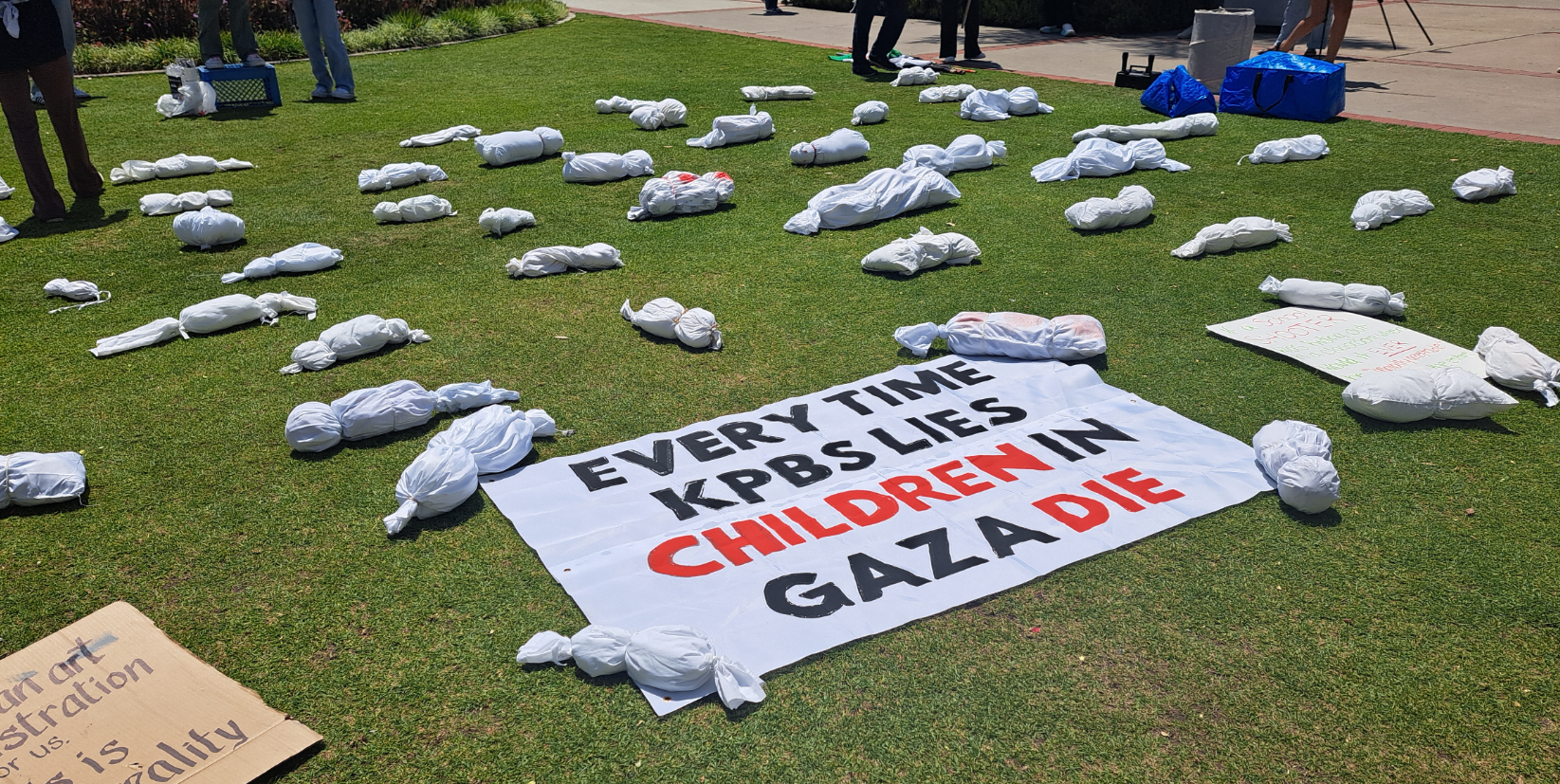
Protest art installation at San Diego State University - April 2024

UNICEF spokesperson Toby Fricker stated, "There is no safe place for children anywhere across the strip right now." On 19 December, the United Nations stated Gaza was "by far the most dangerous place in the world to be a child". James Elder, a UNICEF spokesperson, called the conflict in Gaza a "war on children." On 6 January 2024, Tanya Haj-Hassan, a doctor with Doctors Without Borders, stated children in Gaza were "dying in every way possible." On 18 January 2024, the deputy executive director of UNICEF stated the suffering of children in Gaza were the "most horrific conditions I have ever seen." On 2 February 2024, the UNICEF chair stated, "The situation for children in Gaza grows bleaker every day. The world cannot abandon them." On 5 March, UNICEF called the war on Gaza "a test of human conscience" and stated that the lack of humanitarian aid in the north was worsening children's health situation. Adele Khodr, UNICEF's Middle East regional director, stated on 19 March: "The world’s inaction is shocking as more children succumb to a slow death."

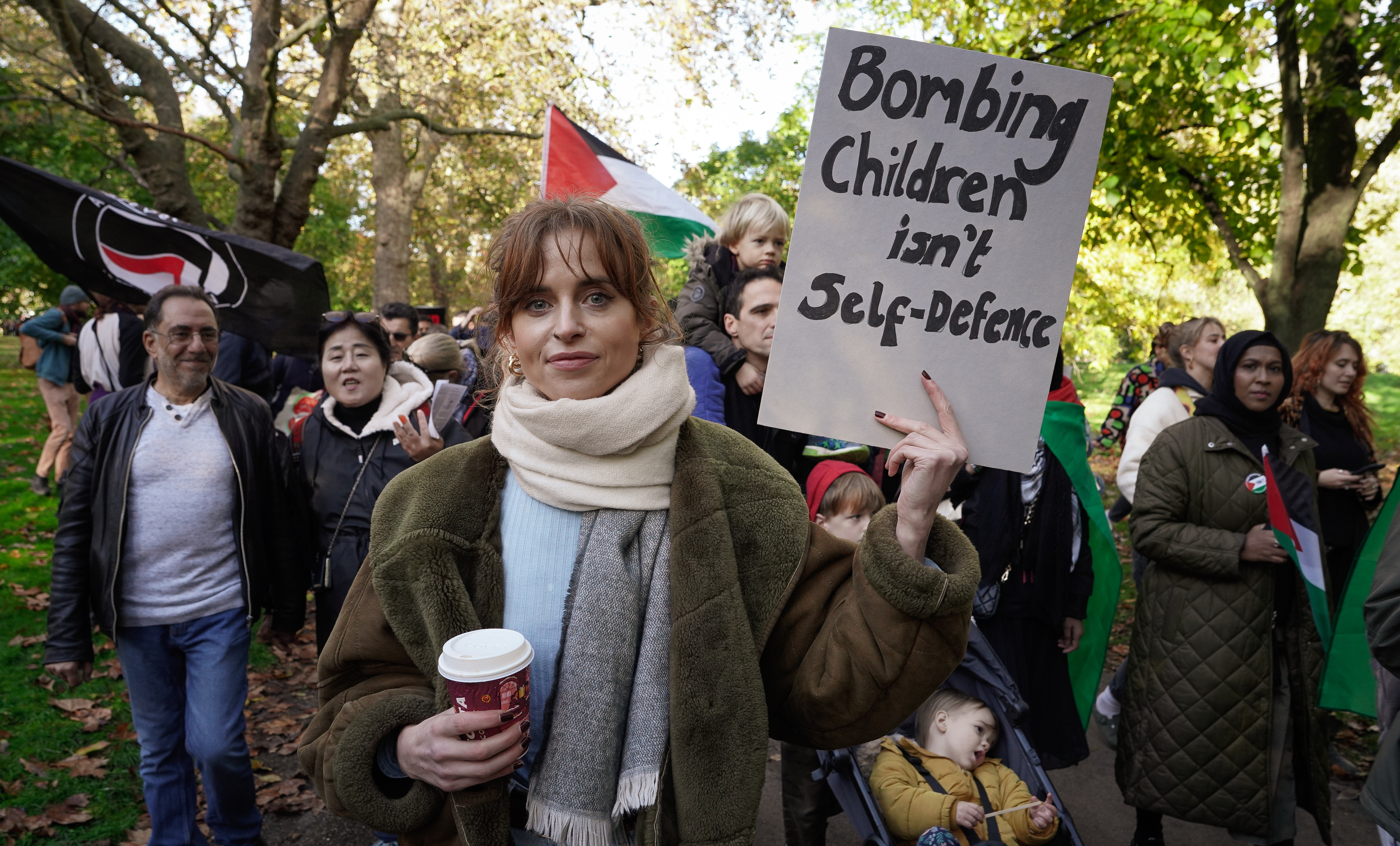
Protestor holding sign against Gaza children deaths during Hyde Park, London protest - November 2023

In an open letter to the United Kingdom government the British Society for Middle Eastern Studies (BRISMES) called the perceived systematic targeting of universities, schools, laboratories and libraries as a component of a genocidal strategy aimed at destroying the Palestinian educations system in Gaza. The chair of the Committee on the Rights of the Child stated on 8 February, "The rights of children living under the state of Israel’s effective control are being gravely violated at a level that has rarely been seen in recent history." The Gulf Cooperation Council called on the UN Human Rights Council to "shoulder their responsibility in ending the tragedy of the children in Gaza and securing their right to live, safety, and protection". The UN Population Fund stated in late-March 2024 that "Pregnant women and new mothers face a constant struggle to keep themselves and their newborns alive." In response to reports that one-third of under-two-year-olds in northern Gaza were acutely malnourished, UNICEF's James Elder, stated, "That is a terrifying number". The UN added Israel to a blacklist of countries that violate the rights of children.

In June 2024, the United Nations stated that grave violations against children in conflict zones had increased 155 percent globally, due especially to explosive weapons used in the Gaza Strip. In September 2024, a UN committee stated Israel had committed severe breaches against children's rights in Gaza, saying, "The outrageous death of children is almost historically unique. This is an extremely dark place in history. I don't think we have seen before, a violation that is so massive, as we are seeing in Gaza now". In October 2024, members of the Independent International Commission of Inquiry on the Occupied Palestinian Territory condemned child deaths in Gaza, stating, "Kids aren't terrorists."

Israel was added to a UN list of entities that commit violations against children. A 2025 UN special commission concluded that "the widespread and systematic targeting of children is part of a strategy to destroy the biological continuity and future existence of the Palestinian group in Gaza, thus part of the intent to destroy Palestinians in Gaza."

=== Politicians and officials ===
Brian Mast, a United States House representative, stated that the babies killed in the Gaza Strip were not innocent civilians. Qatar's prime minister Mohammed bin Abdulrahman bin Jassim Al Thani stated, "I think that we should all unite behind stopping this war, saving those lives, saving those children". Brazilian president Luiz Inácio Lula da Silva stated Israel was killing children under "the pretext of fighting Hamas". German foreign minister Annalena Baerbock stated, "There are also children who have lost their parents. Imagine our own children living without any parents, any water, any food".

The former head of Mossad told Kan that everyone over the age of four "supports Hamas".

On 26 August 2025, former U.S. Ambassador to Israel Jack Lew justified Israel's killing of children during the Gaza war, saying that "in many cases, the children were children of Hamas fighters, not children taking cover in places" and therefore "whether or not it was a legitimate military target flows from the population that’s there".

== See also ==
- Children in the Israeli–Palestinian conflict
- Effect of World War I on children in the United States
- Women in the Gaza war
- Humanitarian aid during the Gaza war
- Gaza: How to Survive a Warzone, documentary film featuring Gazan children
- Gaza genocide
- Israeli war crimes
